= List of flags by color =

This is a list of flags by color. Each section below contains any flag that has any amount of the color listed for that section.

== Black (Sable) ==
- Black flag
- Flag of Afghanistan
- Flag of Afghanistan (variant)
- Flag of Afghanistan (1901–1919)
- Flag of Afghanistan (1919–1921)
- Flag of Afghanistan (1921–1926)
- Flag of Afghanistan (1926–1928)
- Flag of the Islamic Republic of Afghanistan
- Flag of the Islamic Republic of Afghanistan (variant)
- Agender pride flag
- Flag of Ahrar al-Sham
- Flag of Albania
- Civil ensign of Albania
- Naval ensign of Albania
- Flag of Alberta
- Standard of the lieutenant governor of Alberta (1907–1981)
- Flag of Amapá
- Flag of Amsterdam
- Flag of Angola
- Flag of Antigua and Barbuda
- Flag of Arkhangelsk Oblast
- Flag of the Armenian Apostolic Church
- Aromantic pride flag
- Asexual pride flag
- Flag of the Atomwaffen Division
- Flag of the Chief of Navy of Australia
- Flag of the Australian Aboriginals
- State flag of Austria
- Flag of the Bahamas
- Civil ensign of the Bahamas
- Naval ensign of the Bahamas
- Flag of Barbados
- Naval ensign of Barbados
- Flag of Basel-Stadt
- Flag of the Kingdom of Bau (1867–1869)
- Flag of Belgium
- Air Force ensign of Belgium
- Army flag of Belgium
- Naval ensign of Belgium
- State ensign of Belgium
- Flag of Belize
- Flag of Berlin
- Flag of Bhutan
- Flag of the Black Banner Organization
- State flag of Bolivia
- Flag of Botswana
- Flag of British Columbia
- Standard of the lieutenant governor of British Columbia (1871–1906)
- Flag of Brittany
- Flag of Brunei
- Flag of Buckinghamshire
- Flag of the Navy Board of Canada
- Flag of the Royal Military College of Canada
- Canadian Red Ensign (1957–1965)
- Flag of Cornwall
- Flag of Corsica
- State flag of Costa Rica
- Flag of Croatia
- Naval ensign of Croatia
- Demiromantic pride flag
- Demisexual pride flag
- Flag of Devon
- Flag of Dominica
- Flag of the East African Community (shown here without its emblem)
- Flag of Egypt
- Air Force flag of Egypt
- Army flag of Egypt
- Naval ensign of Egypt
- Naval flag of Egypt
- Flag of El Salvador
- Flag of Equatorial Guinea
- Flag of Estonia
- Naval ensign of Estonia
- Naval jack of Estonia
- Presidential flag of Estonia
- Flag of Eswatini
- Flag of the Falkland Islands
- Flag of the Federation des Francophones de Terre-Neuve et du Labrador
- Flag of Fiji
- Civil air ensign of Fiji
- Civil ensign of Fiji
- Civil ensign of Fiji (pre 1970)
- Flag of the Colony of Fiji (1877–1883)
- Flag of the Colony of Fiji (1883–1903)
- Flag of the Colony of Fiji (1903–1908)
- Flag of the Colony of Fiji (1908–1924)
- Flag of the Colony of Fiji (1924–1970)
- Customs ensign of Fiji
- Customs ensign of Fiji (1881–1966)
- Customs ensign of Fiji (1970–1987)
- Flag of the governor of Fiji (1877–1883)
- Flag of the governor of Fiji (1883–1903)
- Flag of the governor of Fiji (1903–1908)
- Flag of the governor of Fiji (1908–1970)
- Flag of the governor-general of Fiji (1970–1987)
- Flag of the Kingdom of Fiji (1871–1874)
- Civil ensign of the Kingdom of Fiji (1871–1874)
- Naval ensign of Fiji
- Royal standard of Fiji (1871–1874)
- State ensign of Fiji
- Flag of Flanders
- Flag of Fribourg
- Genderfluid pride flag
- Flag of Germany
- Naval ensign of Germany
- State flag of Germany
- Flag of Nazi Germany (1935–1945)
- Flag of Ghana
- Civil ensign of Ghana
- Flag of Gibraltar
- Flag of Guinea-Bissau
- Flag of Guyana
- Flag of Haiti
- Islamic flag
- Flag of the Islamic State
- Flag of the Islamic State of Iraq
- Flag of the Isle of Man
- Flag of Jama'at al-Tawhid wal-Jihad
- Flag of Jamaica
- Flag of Jersey
- Jihadist flag
- The Jolly Roger
- Flag of Jordan
- Flag of Kenya
- Flag of Kuwait
- Labrys lesbian flag
- Flag of Lesotho
- Flag of Libya
- Flag of Liechtenstein
- Flag of the City of Madrid
- Flag of Malawi
- Flag of Malta
- Flag of Maranhão
- Flag of Martinique
- Flag of Maryland
- Flag of Mexico
- Flag of Montserrat
- Flag of Moresnet
- Flag of Mozambique
- Flag of New Brunswick
- Nonbinary pride flag
- Flag of Norfolk
- Flag of North Carolina
- Flag of the Northern Mariana Islands
- Flag of the Northern Territory (Australia)
- Flag of the Northwest Territories
- Flag of Nunavut
- Olympic flag
- Flag of Ontario
- Standard of the lieutenant governor of Ontario (1870–1959 and 1965–1981)
- Standard of the lieutenant governor of Ontario (1959–1965)
- Flag of Palestine
- Flag of Papua New Guinea
- Flag of Paraguay (obverse)
- Flag of Paraguay (reverse)
- Flag of Paraíba
- Flag of the Patani United Liberation Organisation (original)
- Flag of the Patani United Liberation Organisation (1989–2005)
- Flag of the Patani United Liberation Organisation (2005–present)
- Flag of Pennsylvania
- Flag of the Pitcairn Islands
- Flag of Pittsburgh
- Polyamory pride flag (1995 Jim Evans version)
- Flag of Portugal
- Progress Pride flag (2018)
- Flag of Prussia (1701–1935)
- Flag of the Duchy of Prussia (1525–1657)
- Flag of the Kingdom of Prussia (1701–1750)
- Flag of the Kingdom of Prussia (1750–1801)
- Flag of the Kingdom of Prussia (1801–1803)
- Flag of the Kingdom of Prussia (1803–1892)
- Flag of Royal Prussia (1466–1772)
- Flag of Saint Kitts and Nevis
- Flag of Saint Lucia
- Flag of San Marino
- Flag of São Paulo (state)
- Flag of São Tomé and Príncipe
- Flag of Saskatchewan
- Flag of the Church of Scotland
- Flag of the Principality of Sealand
- Flag of South Africa
- Flag of South Korea
- Flag of South Sudan
- Flag of Spain
- Flag of Stirling
- Flag of Sudan
- Flag of Syria
- Flag of Tanzania
- Flag of the Canton of Thurgau
- Flag of Timor-Leste
- Flag of Trinidad and Tobago
- Presidential standard of Turkmenistan
- Flag of the Turks and Caicos Islands
- Flag of Udmurtia
- Flag of Uganda
- Flag of the United Arab Emirates
- Flag of Vancouver Island (British colony)
- Flag of Vanuatu
- Flag of Vatican City
- Flag of the Canton of Vaud
- State flag of Venezuela
- Flag of the British Virgin Islands
- Flag of the United States Virgin Islands
- Flag of Wales
- Flag of Washington
- Flag of Washington (1923–1967)
- Flag of Western Australia
- Flag of Yemen
- Flag of Yukon
- Flag of the commissioner of Yukon
- Flag of Zambia
- Flag of Zimbabwe

== Brown (Tenné) ==
- Standard of the lieutenant governor of Alberta (1907–1981)
- Flag of American Samoa
- Flag of Andorra
- Flag of Argentina
- Flag of Ayeyarwady Division
- Flag of Belize
- British Empire flag (1910–1921)
- Flag of California
- Flag of Chimbote
- State Flag of Costa Rica
- Flag of Dominica
- Flag of Ecuador
- Flag of Equatorial Guinea
- Flag of Fiji
- Civil Air Ensign of Fiji
- Civil Ensign of Fiji
- Civil Ensign of Fiji (pre 1970)
- Flag of the Colony of Fiji (1877–1883)
- Flag of the Colony of Fiji (1908–1924)
- Flag of the Colony of Fiji (1924–1970)
- Customs Ensign of Fiji
- Customs Ensign of Fiji (1970–1987)
- Flag of the Governor of Fiji (1877–1883)
- Flag of the Governor of Fiji (1908–1970)
- Flag of the Kingdom of Fiji (1871–1874)
- Civil Ensign of the Kingdom of Fiji (1871–1874)
- Naval Ensign of Fiji
- Royal Standard of Fiji (1871–1874)
- State Ensign of Fiji
- Flag of Guatemala
- Flag of Hertfordshire
- Flag and seal of Illinois
- Flag of Iowa
- LGBTQ+ Philadelphia pride flag
- LGBTQ+ Progress pride flag
- Flag of Maine
- Flag of Maine (1901–1909)
- Flag of Manitoba
- Flag of Mexico
- Flag of Michigan
- Flag of Missouri
- Flag of Moldova
- Flag of Montana
- Flag of North Dakota
- Flag of the Northern Territory (Australia)
- State Flag of Peru
- Flag of Prince Edward Island
- Progress Pride flag (2018)
- Flag of the Church of Scotland
- Flag of the United States Navy
- Flag of Uruguay
- Flag of Utah (2011–2024)
- Flag of Vancouver Island
- Flag of Vatican City
- Flag of Vermont
- Flag of Washington (1923–1967)
- Flag of Yukon

== Blue (Azure) ==
- Flag of Acadia
- Flag of Acadiana
- Flag of Alagoas
- Flag of Åland
- Flag of Alaska
- Naval Ensign of Albania
- Flag of Alberta
- Standard of the Lieutenant Governor of Alberta
- Standard of the lieutenant governor of Alberta (1907–1981)
- Flag of Alexandria
- Flag of Altai
- Flag of Amapá
- Flag of Amazonas (Brazilian state)
- Flag of American Samoa
- Flag of Amur Oblast
- Flag of Andorra
- Flag of Antigua and Barbuda
- Flag of Argentina
- Civil Flag and Ensign of Argentina
- Naval Jack of Argentina
- Flag of Arizona
- Flag of Arkansas
- Flag of Arkhangelsk Oblast
- Flag of Armenia
- Flag of Artigas Department
- Flag of Astrakhan Oblast
- Flag of Asturias
- Flag of Australia
- Air Force Ensign of Australia
- Civil Aviation Ensign of Australia
- Civil Ensign of Australia
- Naval Ensign of Australia
- Flag of the Chief of Navy of Australia
- Flag of the Australian Capital Territory
- Flag of Azerbaijan
- Flag of the Azores
- Flag of the Bahamas
- Civil Ensign of the Bahamas
- Naval Ensign of the Bahamas
- Flag of Bahia
- Air Ensign of Bangladesh
- Flag of Barbados
- Naval Ensign of Barbados
- Flag of the Barisan Revolusi Nasional (alternate)
- Flag of Bashkortostan
- Flag of the Kingdom of Bau (1867–1869)
- Flag of Bavaria (lozenge version)
- Flag of Bavaria (striped version)
- Air Force Ensign of Belgium
- Flag of Belize
- Bisexual pride flag
- Flag of Bosnia and Herzegovina
- Flag of Botswana
- Flag of Brazil
- Naval Jack of Brazil
- Flag of British Columbia
- Standard of the Lieutenant Governor of British Columbia
- Standard of the Lieutenant Governor of British Columbia (1871–1906)
- Standard of the Lieutenant Governor of British Columbia (1906–1982)
- British Empire flag (1910–1921)
- Flag of Brussels
- Buddhist flag
- Flag of Buryatia
- Flag of Cambodia
- Royal Standard of Cambodia
- Flag of the Governor General of Canada
- Flag of the Grand Orange Lodge of Canada
- Flag of the Navy Board of Canada
- Flag of the Navy League of Canada
- Flag of the Canadian Broadcasting Corporation
- Canadian Red Ensign (1957–1965)
- Royal Canadian Air Force Ensign
- Flag of the Royal Canadian Sea Cadets
- Flag of the Canary Islands
- Flag of the Canary Islands (with coat of arms)
- Flag of Cape Breton Island (Eagle version)
- Flag of Cape Verde
- Flag of Ceará
- Flag of the Central African Republic
- Flag of Chad
- Flag of Cheshire
- Flag of Chile
- Naval Jack of Chile
- Flag of the Republic of China
- Army Flag of the Republic of China
- Civil Ensign of the Republic of China (1929–1966)
- Naval jack of the Republic of China
- Christian flag
- Flag of Colombia
- Flag of Colorado
- Flag of the Community of Portuguese Language Countries
- Flag of the Comoros
- Flag of Connecticut
- Flag of Costa Rica
- Flag of Croatia
- Naval Ensign of Croatia
- Flag of Cuba
- Flag of the Czech Republic
- Flag of Dagestan
- Flag of Delaware
- Flag of the Democratic Republic of the Congo
- Flag of Djibouti
- Flag of the East African Community (shown here without its emblem)
- Flag of Ecuador
- Air Force Ensign of Egypt
- Flag of the Egyptian Navy
- Flag of El Salvador
- Civil Ensign of El Salvador
- Flag of Equatorial Guinea
- Flag of Eritrea
- Presidential Flag of Eritrea
- Flag of Espírito Santo
- Flag of Estonia
- Naval Ensign of Estonia
- Naval Jack of Estonia
- Presidential Flag of Estonia
- Flag of Ethiopia
- Flag of Europe
- Flag of the Faroe Islands
- Flag of the Federation des Francophones de Terre-Neuve et du Labrador
- Flag of Fiji
- Civil Air Ensign of Fiji
- Civil Ensign of Fiji
- Civil Ensign of Fiji (pre 1970)
- Flag of the Colony of Fiji (1877–1883)
- Flag of the Colony of Fiji (1883–1903)
- Flag of the Colony of Fiji (1903–1908)
- Flag of the Colony of Fiji (1908–1924)
- Flag of the Colony of Fiji (1924–1970)
- Flag of the Confederacy of Independent Kingdoms of Fiji
- Customs Ensign of Fiji
- Customs Ensign of Fiji (1881–1966)
- Customs Ensign of Fiji (1970–1987)
- Flag of the Governor of Fiji (1877–1883)
- Flag of the Governor of Fiji (1883–1903)
- Flag of the Governor of Fiji (1903–1908)
- Flag of the Governor of Fiji (1908–1970)
- Flag of the Governor-General of Fiji (1970–1987)
- Flag of the Kingdom of Fiji (1871–1874)
- Civil Ensign of the Kingdom of Fiji (1871–1874)
- Naval Ensign of Fiji
- Flag of the President of Fiji
- State Ensign of Fiji
- Flag of Finland
- Presidential Flag of Finland
- State Flag and Ensign of Finland
- War Flag and Naval Ensign of Finland
- Flag of Florida Department (Uruguay)
- Flag of Florida (U.S. State)
- Flag of France
- Franco-Albertan flag
- Flag of Franco-Columbians
- Flag of Friesland
- Flag of Gabon
- Flag of Gagauzia
- Flag of Galicia
- Flag of the Gambia
- Genderfluid pride flag
- Gay pride flag
- Flag of Georgia (U.S. state)
- Flag of Goiás
- Flag of Great Britain (1707–1801)
- Flag of Greece
- Naval Jack of Greece
- Presidential Flag of Greece
- Flag of Guam
- Flag of Guatemala
- Flag of Haiti
- Civil Flag and Ensign of Haiti
- Flag of Hawaii
- Flag of Hertfordshire
- Flag of Honduras
- Hudson's Bay Company flag
- Naval Ensign of Hungary
- Flag of Iceland
- Flag of Idaho
- Flag of India
- Flag of Indiana
- Flag of Iowa
- Presidential Standard of Ireland
- Flag of Israel
- Presidential Flag of Israel
- Presidential Standard of Italy
- Flag of the Jewish Autonomous Oblast
- Flag of Juneau, Alaska
- Flag of Kabardino-Balkaria
- Flag of Kalmykia
- Flag of Kansas
- Flag of Karachay-Cherkessia
- Flag of Karelia
- Flag of Kazakhstan
- Flag of Kentucky
- Flag of Khakassia
- Flag of Kiribati
- Flag of Komi
- Flag of Krasnoyarsk Krai
- Flag of Labrador
- Flag of Lesotho
- LGBTQ+ pride flag
- Flag of Liberia
- Flag of Liechtenstein
- Flag of Louisiana
- Flag of Luxembourg
- Flag of Madeira
- Flag of the City of Madrid
- Flag of Maine
- Flag of Malaysia
- Flag of Manitoba
- Flag of Maranhão
- Flag of Mari El
- Flag of the Marshall Islands
- Flag of Massachusetts
- Flag of Mato Grosso
- Flag of Mato Grosso do Sul
- Flag of Mauritius
- Flag of Mercosur
- Flag of Mexico
- Flag of Michigan
- Flag of Minnesota
- Flag of Mississippi
- Flag of Missouri
- Flag of Moldova
- Flag of the Republic of Molossia
- Flag of Mongolia
- Flag of Montana
- Flag of Montgomery, Alabama
- Flag of Montgomery, Alabama (1952–2026)
- Flag of Mordovia
- Flag of Moresnet
- Flag of Moscow
- Flag of the Musqueam people
- Flag of Namibia
- Flag of Nebraska
- Flag of the Netherlands
- Royal Standard of the Netherlands
- Flag of Nevada
- Flag of New Brunswick
- Flag of New Hampshire
- Flag of New Jersey
- Flag of Newfoundland and Labrador
- Flag of New South Wales
- Flag of New York
- Flag of New York City
- Flag of New Zealand
- Air Force Ensign of New Zealand
- Civil Ensign of New Zealand
- Naval Ensign of New Zealand
- Flag of Nicaragua
- Flag of Niue
- Flag of North Carolina
- Flag of North Dakota
- Flag of North Korea
- Flag of the Northern Mariana Islands
- Flag of the Northwest Territories
- Flag of Norway
- Flag of Nova Scotia
- Flag of Nunatsiavut
- Flag of Nunavut
- Flag of Ohio
- Flag of Oklahoma
- Olympic Flag
- Flag of Ontario
- Standard of the Lieutenant Governor of Ontario (present)
- Standard of the Lieutenant Governor of Ontario (1870–1959 and 1965–1981)
- Standard of the Lieutenant Governor of Ontario (1959–1965)
- Flag of Oregon
- Flag of Oregon (reverse)
- Flag of the Orkney Islands
- Flag of Panama
- Pansexual pride flag
- Flag of Pará
- Flag of Paraguay
- Flag of Paraguay (reverse)
- Paralympic Flag
- Flag of Paraná (state)
- Flag of Paris
- Flag of Pennsylvania
- Ensign of the People's Liberation Army Navy
- Ensign of the People's Liberation Army Air Force
- Flag of Pernambuco
- State Flag of Peru
- Flag of the Philippines
- Flag of Piauí
- Flag of Pocatello, Idaho
- Polyamory pride flag (1995 Jim Evans version)
- Polyamory pride flag (2022 Red Howell version)
- Flag of Portugal
- Presidential Flag of Portugal
- Progress Pride flag (2018)
- Flag of Puerto Rico
- Flag of Quebec
- Flag of Queensland
- Flag of Rhode Island
- Flag of Rio de Janeiro
- Flag of Rio Grande do Norte
- Romani flag
- Flag of Romania
- Flag of the Socialist Republic of Romania (1965–1989)
- Flag of Rondônia
- Flag of Roraima
- Flag of Russia
- Presidential Flag of Russia
- Flag of Rwanda
- Flag of Saint Lucia
- Flag of Saint Vincent and the Grenadines
- Flag of Sakha
- Flag of Salt Lake City
- Flag of Sami
- Flag of San Marino
- Flag of São Paulo (state)
- Standard of the Lieutenant Governor of Saskatchewan
- Flag of Scotland
- Flag of Scotland (color variation)
- Flag of Scotland (color variation)
- Flag of the Church of Scotland
- Scottish Union Jack
- Flag of Serbia
- Flag of Serbia and Montenegro (1992–2006)
- Flag of the Serbian Orthodox Church
- Flag of Sergipe
- Flag of Seychelles
- Flag of the Shetland Islands
- Flag of Sierra Leone
- Sikh flag
- Flag of Slovakia
- Flag of Slovenia
- Flag of Somalia
- Flag of South Africa
- Flag of South Australia
- Flag of South Carolina
- Flag of South Dakota
- Flag of South Georgia and the South Sandwich Islands
- Flag of South Korea
- Presidential Standard of South Korea
- Flag of South Sudan
- Royal Standard of Spain
- Flag of Stirling
- Flag of Suffolk
- Flag of Surrey
- Flag of Sussex
- Flag of Sweden
- Flag of Tanzania
- Flag of Tasmania
- Flag of Tennessee
- Flag of Texas
- Flag of Tibet
- Flag of Tocantins
- Flag of Tokelau
- Royal Standard of Tonga
- Transgender pride flag
- Flag of Tuva
- Flag of Ukraine
- Flag of the United Kingdom
- Air Force Ensign of the United Kingdom
- UK Blue Ensign
- Naval Ensign of the United Kingdom
- UK Red Ensign
- Royal standard of the United Kingdom
- Flag of the United Nations
- Flag of the United States
- Flag of the United States Air Force
- Flag of the United States Army
- Flag of the United States Bureau of Fisheries (1903–1940)
- Flag of the United States Bureau of Navigation (1884–1946)
- Flag of the United States Coast and Geodetic Survey (1899–1970)
- Flag of the Superintendent of the United States Coast and Geodetic Survey (1899)
- Flag of the Director of the United States Coast and Geodetic Survey (ca. 1925)
- Flag of the United States Coast Guard
- Flag of the United States Commissioner of Fisheries (1903–1940)
- Flag of the United States Environmental Science Services Administration (1965–1970)
- Flag of the United States Fish and Wildlife Service (1949–1989)
- Flag of the United States National Oceanic and Atmospheric Administration
- Flag of the United States Navy
- Flag of Uruguay
- Flag of Utah (2011–2024)
- Flag of Uzbekistan
- Flag of Vancouver Island
- Flag of Venezuela
- Flag of Vermont
- Flag of Victoria
- Ensign of the Vietnam People's Navy
- Flag of Virginia
- Flag of the United States Virgin Islands
- Flag of Washington
- Flag of West Virginia
- Flag of Western Australia
- Flag of Winnipeg
- Flag of Wisconsin
- Flag of Wyoming
- Flag of Yorkshire
- Flag of Yugoslavia (1946–1992)
- Flag of Yukon
- Flag of the Commissioner of Yukon

== Gold or Yellow (Or) ==
- Flag of Acadia
- Flag of Acadiana
- Flag of Acre
- Flag of Adygea
- Flag of the Islamic Republic of Afghanistan (variant)
- Flag of Åland
- Flag of Alaska
- Naval Ensign of Albania
- Flag of Alberta
- Standard of the Lieutenant Governor of Alberta
- Standard of the lieutenant governor of Alberta (1907–1981)
- Flag of Alexandria
- Flag of Amapá
- Flag of American Samoa
- Flag of Andorra
- Flag of Angola
- Flag of Antigua and Barbuda
- Flag of Argentina
- Naval Jack of Argentina
- Flag of Arizona
- Flag of the Armenian Apostolic Church
- AroAce pride flag
- Flag of Astrakhan Oblast
- Flag of the Chief of Navy of Australia
- Flag of the Australian Aboriginals
- Flag of the Australian Capital Territory
- State Flag of Austria
- Flag of the Azores
- Flag of the Bahamas
- Civil Ensign of the Bahamas
- Naval Ensign of the Bahamas
- Flag of Barbados
- Naval Ensign of Barbados
- Flag of Barcelona
- Flag of the Barisan Revolusi Nasional
- Flag of the Barisan Revolusi Nasional (alternate)
- Flag of Bashkortostan
- Flag of the Kingdom of Bau (1867–1869)
- Flag of the president of Belarus
- Flag of Belgium
- Air Force Ensign of Belgium
- Army Flag of Belgium
- Naval Ensign of Belgium
- State Ensign of Belgium
- Flag of Belize
- Flag of Benin
- Flag of Bhutan
- Flag of Bolivia
- Flag of Bosnia and Herzegovina
- Flag of Brazil
- Flag of British Columbia
- Standard of the Lieutenant Governor of British Columbia
- Standard of the Lieutenant Governor of British Columbia (1906–1982)
- Standard of the Lieutenant Governor of British Columbia (1871–1906)
- British Empire flag (1910–1921)
- Flag of Brunei
- Flag of Brussels
- Flag of Buckinghamshire
- Buddhist flag
- Flag of Burkina Faso
- Flag of Buryatia
- Royal Standard of Cambodia
- Flag of Cameroon
- Flag of the Anglican Church of Canada
- Flag of the Governor General of Canada
- Flag of the Navy Board of Canada
- Flag of the Navy League of Canada
- Canadian Red Ensign (1957–1965)
- Flag of the Royal Canadian Mint
- Flag of the Royal Canadian Sea Cadets
- Flag of the Canary Islands
- Flag of the Canary Islands (with coat of arms)
- Flag of Cape Breton Island
- Flag of Cape Breton Island (Eagle version)
- Flag of Cape Verde
- Flag of Catalonia
- Flag of Ceará
- Flag of the Central African Republic
- Flag of Chad
- Flag of Chechnya
- Flag of Cheshire
- Civil Ensign of the Republic of China (1929–1966)
- Flag of China
- Flag of the Ground Forces of the People's Republic of China
- Naval Ensign of the People's Republic of China
- Air Force Flag of the People's Republic of China
- Flag of Chuvashia
- Flag of Colombia
- Flag of Colorado
- Flag of the Comoros
- Flag of Connecticut
- State Flag of Costa Rica
- Flag of the Democratic Republic of the Congo
- Flag of the Republic of the Congo
- Flag of Croatia
- Naval Ensign of Croatia
- Flag of Delaware
- Flag of Dominica
- Flag of Dorset
- Flag of the East African Community (shown here without its emblem)
- Flag of Ecuador
- Flag of Egypt
- Air Force Flag of Egypt
- Army Flag of Egypt
- Naval Ensign of Egypt
- Naval Flag of Egypt
- Flag of El Salvador
- Flag of Equatorial Guinea
- Flag of Eritrea
- Flag of Essex
- Naval Ensign of Estonia
- Presidential Flag of Estonia
- Flag of Ethiopia
- Flag of Europe
- Flag of Federal District (Brazil)
- Flag of the Federation des Francophones de Terre-Neuve et du Labrador
- Flag of Fiji
- Civil Air Ensign of Fiji
- Civil Ensign of Fiji
- Civil Ensign of Fiji (pre 1970)
- Flag of the Colony of Fiji (1877–1883)
- Flag of the Colony of Fiji (1883–1903)
- Flag of the Colony of Fiji (1903–1908)
- Flag of the Colony of Fiji (1908–1924)
- Flag of the Colony of Fiji (1924–1970)
- Customs Ensign of Fiji
- Customs Ensign of Fiji (1970–1987)
- Flag of the Governor of Fiji (1877–1883)
- Flag of the Governor of Fiji (1883–1903)
- Flag of the Governor of Fiji (1903–1908)
- Flag of the Governor of Fiji (1908–1970)
- Flag of the Governor-General of Fiji (1970–1987)
- Flag of the Kingdom of Fiji (1871–1874)
- Naval Ensign of Fiji
- Flag of the President of Fiji
- Royal Standard of Fiji (1871–1874)
- State Ensign of Fiji
- Presidential Flag of Finland
- State Flag and Ensign of Finland
- War Flag and Naval Ensign of Finland
- Flag of Flanders
- Flag of Florida
- Flag of Franco-Columbians
- Fransaskois flag
- Flag of Gabon
- Gadsden Flag
- Gay pride flag
- Flag of Georgia (U.S. state)
- Flag of Germany
- Presidential standard of Germany
- Naval ensign of Germany
- State flag of Germany
- Flag of Ghana
- Civil Ensign of Ghana
- Flag of Goiás
- Presidential Flag of Greece
- Flag of Grenada
- Naval Ensign of Grenada
- Flag of Guam
- Flag of Guatemala
- Flag of Guinea
- Flag of Guinea-Bissau
- Flag of Guyana
- Flag of Haiti
- Flag of Hertfordshire
- Naval Ensign of Hungary
- Flag of Idaho
- Flag of Illinois
- Flag of Indiana
- Intersex pride flag
- Presidential Standard of Ireland
- Presidential Standard of Italy
- Jain flag
- Flag of Jama'at al-Tawhid wal-Jihad
- Flag of Jamaica
- Imperial Standard of Japan
- Flag of the Jewish Autonomous Oblast
- Flag of Kalmykia
- Flag of Kansas
- Flag of Karachay-Cherkessia
- Flag of Kazakhstan
- Flag of Kentucky
- Flag of Khakassia
- Flag of Kiribati
- Flag of Krasnoyarsk Krai
- Flag of Kurdistan
- Flag of Kyrgyzstan
- Flag of Lancashire
- LGBTQ+ pride flag
- Flag of Lithuania
- Flag of Los Angeles
- Flag of Louisiana
- Flag of Madeira
- Flag of Maine
- Flag of Mali
- Flag of Manchukuo (1932–1945)
- Flag of Maryland
- Flag of Massachusetts
- Flag of Mato Grosso
- Flag of Mato Grosso do Sul
- Flag of Mauritania
- Flag of Mauritius
- Flag of Michigan
- Flag of Minnesota
- Flag of Mississippi
- Flag of Missouri
- Flag of Mongolia
- Flag of Montana
- Flag of Mozambique
- Flag of Myanmar
- Flag of Namibia
- Flag of Nebraska
- Flag of Nevada
- Flag of New Brunswick
- Flag and seal of New Hampshire
- Coat of arms and flag of New Jersey
- Flag of New Mexico
- Flag of New South Wales
- Flag and coat of arms of New York
- Flag of Nicaragua
- Flag of Niue
- Nonbinary pride flag
- Flag of Norfolk
- Flag of North Carolina
- Flag of North Dakota
- Flag of North Macedonia
- Flag of Northumberland
- Flag of the Northwest Territories
- Royal Standard of Norway
- Flag of Nova Scotia
- Flag of Nunavut
- Olympic Flag
- Flag of Ontario
- Standard of the Lieutenant Governor of Ontario (present)
- Standard of the Lieutenant Governor of Ontario (1870–1959 and 1965–1981)
- Standard of the Lieutenant Governor of Ontario (1959–1965)
- Flag of Oregon
- Flag of the Orkney Islands
- Flag of Ossetia
- Pansexual pride flag
- Flag of Paraguay
- Flag of Patani United Liberation Organisation (original)
- Flag of Patani United Liberation Organisation (1989–2005)
- Flag of Patani United Liberation Organisation (2005–present)
- Flag of the Patria Vieja (1812–1814)
- Flag of Pennsylvania
- Flag of Pernambuco
- Flag of the Philippines
- Flag of Piauí
- Presidential Flag of Poland
- Polyamory pride flag (1995 Jim Evans version)
- Polyamory pride flag (2022 Red Howell version)
- Flag of Portugal
- Presidential Flag of Portugal
- Progress Pride flag (2018)
- Flag of Prince Edward Island
- Flag of Queensland
- Flag of Rhode Island
- Flag of Rio Grande do Norte
- Flag of Rio Grande do Sul
- Flag of Romania
- Flag of the Socialist Republic of Romania (1965–1989)
- Flag of the City of Rome
- Flag of Rondônia
- Flag of Roraima
- Flag of the Royal Military College of Canada
- Presidential Flag of Russia
- Flag of Rwanda
- Flag of Saint Kitts and Nevis
- Flag of Saint Lucia
- Flag of Saint Petersburg
- Flag of Saint Vincent and the Grenadines
- Flag of Sami
- Flag of São Paulo (state)
- Flag of São Tomé and Príncipe
- Flag of Saskatchewan
- Saskatchewan 60th anniversary flag
- Standard of the Lieutenant Governor of Saskatchewan
- Flag of the Church of Scotland
- Flag of Senegal
- Flag of the Serbian Orthodox Church
- Flag of Sergipe
- Flag of Seychelles
- Flag of Somerset
- Flag of South Africa
- Flag of South Australia
- Flag of South Dakota
- Presidential Standard of South Korea
- Flag of South Sudan
- Flag of South Vietnam
- Naval ensign of South Vietnam
- Flag of the Soviet Union
- Flag of Spain
- Royal Standard of Spain
- Flag of Stavropol Krai
- Flag of Suffolk
- Flag of Suriname
- Flag of Surrey
- Flag of Sussex
- Flag of Sweden
- Flag of Tanzania
- Flag of the Kingdom of Tavolara
- Royal Standard of Thailand
- Flag of the Canton of Thurgau
- Flag of Tibet
- Flag of Tocantins
- Flag of Togo
- Flag of Tokelau
- Royal Standard of Tonga
- Presidential Flag of Turkey
- Flag of Tuva
- Flag of Uganda
- Flag of Ukraine
- Royal standard of the United Kingdom
- Flag of the United States Environmental Science Services Administration (1965–1970)
- Flag of United States Marine Corps
- Flag of the United States Navy
- Flag of the United States Public Health Service
- Flag of Uruguay
- Flag of Utah (2011–2024)
- Flag of Vancouver Island
- Flag of Vanuatu
- Flag of Vatican City
- Flag of the Canton of Vaud
- Flag of Venezuela
- Flag of Vermont
- Flag of Victoria
- Ensign of the Vietnam People's Navy
- Flag and seal of Virginia
- Flag of Wallonia
- Flag of Washington
- Flag of Washington (1923–1967)
- Flag of Western Australia
- Flag of the West Indies Federation (1958–1962)
- Flag of West Virginia
- Flag of Winnipeg
- Flag of Wisconsin
- Flag of Yorkshire
- Flag of Yukon
- Flag of the Commissioner of Yukon
- Flag of Zimbabwe

== Green (Vert) ==
- Green flag
- Flag of Acre
- Flag of Adygea
- Flag of the Islamic Republic of Afghanistan
- Flag of the Islamic Republic of Afghanistan (variant)
- Agender pride flag
- Flag of Ahrar al-Sham
- Flag of Alagoas
- Flag of Alberta
- Standard of the Lieutenant Governor of Alberta
- Standard of the lieutenant governor of Alberta (1870–1959 and 1965–1981)
- Flag of Algeria
- Naval Ensign of Algeria
- Flag of Amapá
- Flag of the Arab League
- Flag of Astrakhan Oblast
- Flag of Azerbaijan
- Flag of Bangladesh
- Civil Ensign of Bangladesh
- Naval Ensign of Bangladesh
- Flag of the Barisan Revolusi Nasional
- Flag of Bashkortostan
- Flag of the Basque Country
- Flag of Belarus
- Flag of the President of Belarus
- Flag of Belize
- Flag of Benin
- Flag of Bolivia
- Flag of Brazil
- Standard of the Lieutenant Governor of British Columbia (1871–1906)
- Standard of the Lieutenant Governor of British Columbia (1906–1982)
- British Empire flag (1910–1921)
- Flag of the British Indian Ocean Territory
- Flag of Bulgaria
- Flag of Burkina Faso
- Flag of Burundi
- Flag of California
- Flag of Cameroon
- Flag of the Anglican Church of Canada
- Flag of Cape Breton Island
- Flag of the Cayman Islands
- Flag of Ceará
- Flag of the Central African Republic
- Flag of Chechnya
- Flag of the Ground Forces of the People's Republic of China
- Flag of the Comoros
- Flag of the Republic of the Congo
- Flag of Connecticut
- State Flag of Costa Rica
- Flag of Cyprus
- Flag of Dagestan
- Flag of Delaware
- Flag of Devon
- Flag of Djibouti
- Flag of Dominica
- Flag of the Dominican Republic
- Flag of the East African Community (shown here without its emblem)
- Flag of Ecuador
- Flag of El Salvador
- Flag of Equatorial Guinea
- Flag of Eritrea
- Presidential Flag of Eritrea
- Esperanto flag
- Flag of Ethiopia
- Flag of the Falkland Islands
- Flag of Federal District (Brazil)
- Flag of Fiji
- Civil Air Ensign of Fiji
- Civil Ensign of Fiji
- Civil Ensign of Fiji (pre 1970)
- Flag of the Colony of Fiji (1877–1883)
- Flag of the Colony of Fiji (1883–1903)
- Flag of the Colony of Fiji (1903–1908)
- Flag of the Colony of Fiji (1908–1924)
- Flag of the Colony of Fiji (1924–1970)
- Customs Ensign of Fiji
- Customs Ensign of Fiji (1970–1987)
- Flag of the Governor of Fiji (1877–1883)
- Flag of the Governor of Fiji (1883–1903)
- Flag of the Governor of Fiji (1903–1908)
- Flag of the Governor of Fiji (1908–1970)
- Flag of the Governor-General of Fiji (1970–1987)
- Flag of the Kingdom of Fiji (1871–1874)
- Civil Ensign of the Kingdom of Fiji (1871–1874)
- Naval Ensign of Fiji
- Royal Standard of Fiji (1871–1874)
- State Ensign of Fiji
- Flag of Florida
- Franco-Ontarian flag
- Fransaskois flag
- Flag of Gabon
- Flag of the Gambia
- Gay pride flag
- Flag of Ghana
- Civil Ensign of Ghana
- Flag of Goiás
- Flag of Grenada
- Naval Ensign of Grenada
- Flag of Guam
- Flag of Guatemala
- Flag of Guinea
- Flag of Guinea-Bissau
- Flag of Guyana
- Flag of Haiti
- Flag of Hamas
- Flag of Herat (1818–1842)
- Flag of Hungary
- Naval Ensign of Hungary
- Flag of India
- Flag of Ingushetia
- Flag of Iran
- Flag of Iraq
- Flag of Ireland
- Flag of Italy
- Presidential Standard of Italy
- Flag of Ivory Coast
- Jain flag
- Flag of Jamaica
- Flag of the Jewish Autonomous Oblast
- Flag of Jordan
- Flag of Kabardino-Balkaria
- Flag of Kansas
- Flag of Karachay-Cherkessia
- Flag of Karelia
- Flag of Kentucky
- Flag of Kenya
- Flag of Khakassia
- Flag of Komi
- Flag of Kurdistan
- Flag of Kuwait
- Flag of Labrador
- Flag of Lancashire
- Flag of Lebanon
- Flag of Lesotho
- Flag of Libya
- Flag of Lithuania
- Flag of Los Angeles
- Flag of Macau
- Flag of Madagascar
- Flag of the City of Madrid
- Flag of Maine
- Flag of Malawi
- Flag of Maldives
- Flag of Mali
- Flag of Manitoba
- Flag of Mato Grosso
- Flag of Mato Grosso do Sul
- Flag of Mauritania
- Flag of Mauritius
- Flag of Mexico
- Flag of Missouri
- Flag of the Republic of Molossia
- Flag of Montana
- Flag of Morocco
- Flag of Mozambique
- Flag of Myanmar
- Flag of Namibia
- Flag of the Canton of Neuchâtel
- Flag of Nevada
- Newfoundland Tricolour
- Flag of New Hampshire
- Flag and coat of arms of New York
- Flag of Nicaragua
- Flag of Niger
- Flag of Nigeria
- Flag of Norfolk Island
- Flag of North Dakota
- Flag of the Northern Mariana Islands
- Flag of the Northwest Territories
- Flag of Nottinghamshire
- Flag of Nunatsiavut
- Flag of Oklahoma
- Olympic Flag
- Flag of Oman
- Flag of Ontario
- Standard of the Lieutenant Governor of Ontario (present)
- Standard of the Lieutenant Governor of Ontario (1870–1959 and 1965–1981)
- Standard of the Lieutenant Governor of Ontario (1959–1965)
- Flag of the Organisation of African Unity (1963–2002)
- Flag of Pakistan
- Flag of Palestine
- Flag of Paraguay
- Paralympic Flag
- Flag of Paraná (state)
- Flag of Piauí
- Flag of the Pitcairn Islands
- Flag of Portugal
- Presidential Flag of Portugal
- Flag of Prince Edward Island
- Progress Pride flag (2018)
- Flag of Rhodesia
- Flag of Rio Grande do Norte
- Flag of Rio Grande do Sul
- Romani flag
- Flag of Rondônia
- Flag of Roraima
- Flag of the Royal Military College of Canada
- Flag of Rwanda
- Flag of Saint Kitts and Nevis
- Flag of Saint Vincent and the Grenadines
- Flag of Sakha
- Flag of Sami
- Flag of San Marino
- Flag of Santa Catarina (state)
- Flag of São Tomé and Príncipe
- Flag of Saskatchewan
- Saskatchewan 60th anniversary flag
- Standard of the Lieutenant Governor of Saskatchewan
- Flag of Saudi Arabia
- Flag of Saxony
- Flag of the Church of Scotland
- Flag of Senegal
- Flag of Sergipe
- Flag of Seychelles
- Flag of Sierra Leone
- Flag of the Solomon Islands
- Flag of South Africa
- Flag of South Sudan
- Flag of Sri Lanka
- Flag of the Canton of St. Gallen
- Flag of Sudan
- Flag of Suriname
- Flag of Syria
- Flag of Tajikistan
- Flag of Tanzania
- Flag of Tatarstan
- Flag of the Canton of Thurgau
- Flag of Togo
- Flag of Turkmenistan
- Flag of the Turks and Caicos Islands
- Flag of the United Arab Emirates
- Flag of Utah (2011–2024)
- Flag of Uzbekistan
- Flag of Vancouver Island
- Flag of Vanuatu
- Flag of the Canton of Vaud
- Flag of Vermont
- Flag and seal of Virginia
- Flag of the British Virgin Islands
- Flag of the United States Virgin Islands
- Flag of Wales
- Flag of Washington
- Flag of Washington (1923–1967)
- Flag of West Virginia
- Flag of Yorkshire
- Flag of the Yukon Territory
- Flag of Zakynthos
- Flag of Zambia
- Flag of Zimbabwe

== Maroon (Sanguine or Murrey) ==
- Flag of the Chief of Navy of Australia
- Flag of the Navy Board of Canada
- Flag of Qatar
- Flag of Sri Lanka
- Flag of Latvia

== Orange (Orange) ==
- Flag of Albany, New York
- Flag of Alberta
- Standard of the Lieutenant Governor of Alberta
- Flag of Armenia
- Flag of Ashkelon
- Flag of Astrakhan Oblast
- Flag of the Kingdom of Bau (1867–1869)
- Flag of Bhutan
- Flag of Bophuthatswana
- Buddhist flag
- Flag of the Governor General of Canada
- Flag of the Grand Orange Lodge of Canada
- Flag of the Chagossians
- Flag of Cyprus
- Flag of Delaware
- Flag of El Salvador
- Presidential Flag of Eritrea
- Flag of the Kingdom of Fiji (1871–1874)
- Royal Standard of Fiji (1871–1874)
- Fransaskois flag
- Gay pride flag
- Flag of Guatemala
- Flag and seal of Illinois
- Flag of India
- Flag of Ireland
- Flag of Ivory Coast
- Flag of the Jewish Autonomous Oblast
- Flag of Kfar Saba
- Lesbian pride flag (2018)
- Flag of the Marshall Islands
- Royal Standard of the Netherlands
- Flag of Newfoundland and Labrador
- Flag of New Ireland Province
- Flag of New York City
- Flag of Nicaragua
- Flag of Niger
- Flag of the Orange Free State
- Progress Pride flag (2018)
- Flag of Rishon LeZion
- Flag of San Jose, California
- Flag of the Church of Scotland
- Sikh flag
- Flag of South Africa (1928–1994)
- Flag of Sri Lanka
- Flag of the Tierra del Fuego Province, Argentina
- Flag of Zakynthos
- Flag of Zambia

== Pink (Rose) ==
- Bisexual flag
- Flag of Espírito Santo
- Flag of Jalal-Abad
- Lesbian pride flag (2018)
- Newfoundland Tricolour
- Pansexual flag
- Progress Pride flag (2018)
- Transgender flag

== Purple (Purpure) or Lilac ==
- Flag of the city of Ambrolauri
- Flag of the Municipality of Ambrolauri
- Flag of the Armenian Apostolic Church
- Asexual flag
- Flag of the Balearic Islands
- Bisexual pride flag
- Flag of the Choctaw Nation of Oklahoma
- Flag of Connecticut
- Flag of Dominica
- Flag of the Supreme Court of the Dominican Republic
- Flag of El Salvador
- Gay pride flag
- Flag of the International Brigades
- Flag of the Iroquois Confederacy
- Flag of the Jewish Autonomous Oblast
- Labrys lesbian flag
- Flag of Málaga
- Flag of Montreal
- Flag of Nicaragua
- Flag of the Ninotsminda municipality
- Progress Pride flag (2018)
- Flag of the Sagarejo municipality
- Flag of Saskatoon
- Flag of the Second Spanish Republic
- Flag of Spain
- Flag of Tokyo
- Flag of the city of Vagharshapat
- Flag and seal of Virginia

== Red (Gules) or Magenta ==
- Red flag (disambiguation)
- Flag of Acadia
- Flag of Acadiana
- Flag of Acre
- Flag of Alabama
- Flag of Alagoas
- Flag of Åland
- Flag of Albania
- Civil Ensign of Albania
- Flag of Alberta
- Standard of the Lieutenant Governor of Alberta
- Standard of the lieutenant governor of Alberta (1907–1981)
- Flag of Algeria
- Naval Ensign of Algeria
- Flag of Amazonas (Brazilian state)
- Flag of American Samoa
- Flag of Amsterdam
- Flag of Amur Oblast
- Flag of Andorra
- Flag of Angola
- Flag of Anguilla
- Flag of Antigua and Barbuda
- Flag of Arizona
- Flag of Arkansas
- Flag of Arkhangelsk Oblast
- Flag of Armenia
- Flag of Aruba
- Flag of Australia
- Air Force Ensign of Australia
- Civil Aviation Ensign of Australia
- Civil Ensign of Australia
- Naval Ensign of Australia
- Australian Aboriginal Flag
- Flag of Austria
- State Flag of Austria
- Flag of Azerbaijan
- Civil Ensign of the Bahamas
- Naval Ensign of the Bahamas
- Flag of Bahia
- Flag of Bahrain
- Flag of Bangladesh
- Civil Ensign of Bangladesh
- Naval Ensign of Bangladesh
- Naval Ensign of Barbados
- Flag of Barcelona
- Flag of the Barisan Revolusi Nasional
- Flag of the Barisan Revolusi Nasional (alternate)
- Flag of the Basque Country
- Flag of the Kingdom of Bau (1867–1869)
- Flag of Belarus
- Flag of the president of Belarus
- Flag of Belgium
- Air Force Ensign of Belgium
- Army Flag of Belgium
- Naval Ensign of Belgium
- State Ensign of Belgium
- Flag of Belize
- Flag of Benin
- Flag of Berlin
- Flag of Bermuda
- Flag of Bolivia
- Flag of British Columbia
- Standard of the Lieutenant Governor of British Columbia
- Standard of the Lieutenant Governor of British Columbia (1871–1906)
- Standard of the Lieutenant Governor of British Columbia (1906–1982)
- British Empire flag (1910–1921)
- Flag of the British Indian Ocean Territory
- Flag of Brunei
- Flag of Buckinghamshire
- Buddhist flag
- Flag of Bulgaria
- Flag of Burkina Faso
- Flag of Burundi
- Flag of California
- Flag of Cambodia
- Flag of Cameroon
- Flag of Canada
- Flag of the Anglican Church of Canada
- Flag of the Governor General of Canada
- Flag of the Grand Orange Lodge of Canada
- Canadian Naval Ensign
- Flag of the Navy League of Canada
- Canadian Red Ensign (1957–1965)
- Flag of the Royal Canadian Mint
- Flag of the Royal Canadian Sea Cadets
- Flag of the Canadian Broadcasting Corporation
- Flag of Cape Verde
- Flag of Catalonia
- Flag of the Cayman Islands
- Flag of the Central African Republic
- Flag of Chad
- Flag of Chechnya
- Flag of Chile
- Flag of the Republic of China
- Army Flag of the Republic of China
- Flag of China
- Air Force Flag of the People's Republic of China
- Flag of the Ground Forces of the People's Republic of China
- Naval Ensign of the People's Republic of China
- Christian flag
- Flag of Colombia
- Flag of Colorado
- Flag of the Comoros
- Flag of Costa Rica
- Flag of the Democratic Republic of the Congo
- Flag of the Republic of the Congo
- Flag of the Cook Islands
- Flag of the Cretan State
- Flag of Croatia
- Naval Ensign of Croatia
- Flag of Cuba
- Flag of the Czech Republic
- Flag of Dagestan
- Flag of Delaware
- Flag of Denmark
- Naval Ensign of Denmark
- Royal Standard of Denmark
- State Flag and Ensign of Denmark
- Flag of Djibouti
- Flag of Dominica
- Flag of the Dominican Republic
- Flag of Dorset
- Flag of the East African Community (shown here without its emblem)
- Flag of Ecuador
- Flag of Egypt
- Air Force Ensign of Egypt
- Army Flag of Egypt
- Naval Ensign of Egypt
- Naval Flag of Egypt
- Flag of El Salvador
- Flag of England
- Flag of Equatorial Guinea
- Flag of Eritrea
- Presidential Flag of Eritrea
- Flag of Essex
- Presidential Flag of Estonia
- Naval Ensign of Estonia
- Flag of Ethiopia
- Flag of the Falkland Islands
- Flag of the Faroe Islands
- Flag of the Fédération des Francophones de Terre-Neuve et du Labrador
- Flag of Fiji
- Civil Air Ensign of Fiji
- Civil Ensign of Fiji
- Civil Ensign of Fiji (pre 1970)
- Flag of the Colony of Fiji (1877–1883)
- Flag of the Colony of Fiji (1883–1903)
- Flag of the Colony of Fiji (1903–1908)
- Flag of the Colony of Fiji (1908–1924)
- Flag of the Colony of Fiji (1924–1970)
- Customs Ensign of Fiji
- Customs Ensign of Fiji (1881–1966)
- Customs Ensign of Fiji (1970–1987)
- Flag of the Governor of Fiji (1877–1883)
- Flag of the Governor of Fiji (1883–1903)
- Flag of the Governor of Fiji (1903–1908)
- Flag of the Governor of Fiji (1908–1970)
- Flag of the Governor-General of Fiji (1970–1987)
- Flag of the Kingdom of Fiji (1871–1874)
- Civil Ensign of the Kingdom of Fiji (1871–1874)
- Naval Ensign of Fiji
- Royal Standard of Fiji (1871–1874)
- State Ensign of Fiji
- Naval Jack of Finland
- Presidential Flag of Finland
- State Flag and Ensign of Finland
- War Flag and Naval Ensign of Finland
- Flag of Flanders
- Flag of Florida (USA state)
- Flag of Florida (Uruguay department)
- Flag of France
- Naval Ensign of France
- Flag of French Polynesia
- Franco-Albertan flag
- Flag of Friesland
- Flag of the Gambia
- Gay pride flag
- Flag of Georgia
- Flag of Georgia (U.S. state)
- Flag of Germany
- Naval ensign of Germany
- Presidential standard of Germany
- State flag of Germany
- Flag of Nazi Germany (1935–1945)
- Flag of Ghana
- Civil Ensign of Ghana
- Flag of Gibraltar
- Flag of Great Britain (1707–1801)
- Flag of Greenland
- Flag of Grenada
- Naval Ensign of Grenada
- Flag of Guam
- Flag of Guernsey
- Flag of Guinea
- Flag of Guinea-Bissau
- Flag of Guyana
- Flag of the Council of the Haida Nation
- Flag of Haiti
- Civil Flag and Ensign of Haiti
- Flag of Hamburg
- Flag of Hawaii
- Flag of Hong Kong
- Hudson's Bay Company flag
- Flag of Hungary
- Naval Ensign of Hungary
- Flag of Iceland
- Flag of Idaho
- Flag of Illinois
- Flag of Indonesia
- Flag of Ingushetia
- Flag of Iowa
- Flag of Iran
- Flag of Italy
- Presidential Standard of Italy
- Jain flag
- Flag of Japan
- Imperial Standard of Japan
- Flag of Jersey
- Flag of the Jewish Autonomous Oblast
- Flag of Jordan
- Flag of Karachay-Cherkessia
- Flag of Karelia
- Flag of Kenya
- Flag of Kent
- Flag of Khakassia
- Flag of Kiribati
- Flag of Krasnoyarsk Krai
- Flag of Kurdistan
- Flag of Kuwait
- Flag of Kyrgyzstan
- Flag of Lancashire
- Flag of Laos
- Flag of the Confederation of Lau (1869–1871)
- Flag of the king of Lau (1869–1871)
- Flag of Lebanon
- Flag of Leiden
- Flag of Liberia
- Flag of Libya
- Flag of Liechtenstein
- Flag of Lithuania
- Flag of the City of London
- Flag of Los Angeles
- Flag of Louisiana
- Flag of Luxembourg
- Flag of Madagascar
- Flag of Madeira
- Flag of Maine
- Flag of Malawi
- Flag of Malaysia
- Flag of Maldives
- Flag of Mali
- Flag of Malta
- Flag of the Isle of Man
- Flag of Manitoba
- Flag of Maranhão
- Flag of Maryland
- Flag of Mauritania
- Flag of Mauritius
- Flag of Mexico
- Flag of Michigan
- Flag of the Mi'kmaq Grand Council
- Flag of Minas Gerais
- Flag of Minnesota
- Flag of Mississippi
- Flag of Missouri
- Flag of Moldova
- Flag of Monaco
- Flag of Mongolia
- Flag of Montserrat
- Flag of Mordovia
- Flag of Morocco
- Flag of Moscow
- Flag of Mozambique
- Flag of Myanmar
- Flag of Namibia
- Flag of Nepal
- Flag of the Netherlands
- Flag of the Netherlands Antilles(1959–1986)
- Flag of New Brunswick
- Flag of New Hampshire
- Flag of New Jersey
- Flag of New Mexico
- Flag of New South Wales
- Flag of New York
- Flag of New Zealand
- Civil Ensign of New Zealand
- Naval Ensign of New Zealand
- Air Force Ensign of New Zealand
- Flag of Newfoundland and Labrador
- Flag of Nicaragua
- Flag of Niue
- Flag of North Carolina
- Flag of North Dakota
- Flag of North Korea
- Flag of North Macedonia
- Flag of Ossetia
- Flag of the Northern Mariana Islands
- Flag of Northumberland
- Flag of the Northwest Territories
- Flag of Norway
- Royal Standard of Norway
- Flag of Nottinghamshire
- Flag of Nova Scotia
- Flag of Nunavut
- Flag of Ohio
- Olympic Flag
- Flag of Oman
- Flag of Ontario
- Standard of the Lieutenant Governor of Ontario (present)
- Standard of the Lieutenant Governor of Ontario (1870–1959 and 1965–1981)
- Standard of the Lieutenant Governor of Ontario (1959–1965)
- Flag of the Orkney Islands
- Flag of Palestine
- Flag of Panama
- Flag of Papua New Guinea
- Flag of Pará
- Flag of Paraguay
- Flag of Paraíba
- Paralympic Flag
- Flag of Paris
- Flag of Patani United Liberation Organisation (original)
- Flag of Patani United Liberation Organisation (1989–2005)
- Flag of Patani United Liberation Organisation (2005–present)
- Flag of Pennsylvania
- Flag of Pernambuco
- Flag of Peru
- Flag of the Philippines
- Flag of the Pitcairn Islands
- Flag of Poland
- Presidential Flag of Poland
- Polyamory pride flag (1995 Jim Evans version)
- Polyamory pride flag (2022 Red Howell version)
- Flag of Portugal
- Presidential Flag of Portugal
- Progress Pride flag (2018)
- Flag of Prince Edward Island
- Flag of Puerto Rico
- Flag of Queensland
- Flag of Rio Grande do Sul
- Romani flag
- Flag of Romania
- Flag of the Socialist Republic of Romania (1965–1989)
- Flag of Roraima
- Flag of the Royal Military College of Canada
- Flag of Russia
- Presidential Flag of Russia
- Flag of Sakha
- Flag of Saint Kitts and Nevis
- Flag of Saint Petersburg
- Flag of Sami
- Flag of Samoa
- Flag of Santa Catarina (state)
- Flag of São Paulo (state)
- Flag of São Tomé and Príncipe
- Flag of Saskatchewan
- Saskatchewan 60th anniversary flag
- Standard of the Lieutenant Governor of Saskatchewan
- Scottish Union Jack
- Flag of the Principality of Sealand
- Flag of Senegal
- Flag of Serbia
- Flag of Serbia and Montenegro (1992–2006)
- Flag of the Serbian Orthodox Church
- Flag of Seychelles
- Flag of Singapore
- Flag of Slovakia
- Flag of Slovenia
- Flag of Somerset
- Flag of South Africa
- Flag of South Australia
- Flag of South Georgia and the South Sandwich Islands
- Flag of South Korea
- Flag of South Sudan
- Flag of South Vietnam
- Flag and coat of arms of the Sovereign Military Order of Malta
- Flag of the Soviet Union
- Flag of Spain
- Royal Standard of Spain
- Statenvlag
- Flag of Stirling
- Flag of Sudan
- Flag of Suriname
- Flag of Switzerland
- Flag of Switzerland (Color variant)
- Flag of Syria
- Flag of the Republic of China
- Flag of Tajikistan
- Flag of Tasmania
- Flag of Tatarstan
- Flag of the Kingdom of Tavolara
- Flag of Tennessee
- Flag of Texas
- Flag of Thailand
- Royal Standard of Thailand
- Flag of the Canton of Thurgau
- Flag of Tibet
- Flag of Timor-Leste
- Flag of Togo
- Flag of Tonga
- Royal Standard of Tonga
- Flag of Trinidad and Tobago
- Flag of Tunisia
- Flag of Turkey
- Presidential Flag of Turkey
- Flag of Turkmenistan
- Flag of the Turks and Caicos Islands
- Flag of Tuvalu
- Flag of Udmurtia
- Flag of Uganda
- Flag of the United Arab Emirates
- Flag of the United Kingdom
- Air Force Ensign of the United Kingdom
- UK Blue Ensign
- Naval Ensign of the United Kingdom
- UK Red Ensign
- Royal standard of the United Kingdom
- Flag of the United States
- Flag of the United States Air Force
- Flag of the United States Army
- Flag of the United States Bureau of Navigation (1884–1946)
- Flag of the United States Bureau of Fisheries (1903–1940)
- Flag of the United States Coast and Geodetic Survey (1899–1970)
- Flag of the United States Coast Guard
- Flag of the United States Environmental Science Services Administration (1965–1970)
- Flag of the United States Marine Corps
- Flag of the United States National Oceanic and Atmospheric Administration
- Flag of the United States Navy
- Flag of Utah 2011–2024
- Flag of Uzbekistan
- Flag of Vancouver Island
- Flag of Vanuatu
- Flag of Vermont
- Flag of Venezuela
- Flag of Victoria, Australia
- Flag of Vietnam
- Flag of Virginia
- Flag of the British Virgin Islands
- Flag of the United States Virgin Islands
- Flag of Wales
- Flag of Wallonia
- Flag of Western Australia
- Flag of West Virginia
- Flag of Wisconsin
- Flag of Wyoming
- Flag of Yukon
- Flag of the Commissioner of Yukon
- Flag of Zambia
- Flag of Zimbabwe

== White (Argent) ==
- White flag
- Flag of Acadia
- Flag of Acadiana
- Flag of Afghanistan
- Flag of Afghanistan (variant)
- Flag of Afghanistan (1901–1919)
- Flag of Afghanistan (1919–1921)
- Flag of Afghanistan (1921–1926)
- Flag of Afghanistan (1926–1928)
- Flag of the Islamic Republic of Afghanistan
- Flag of the Islamic Republic of Afghanistan (variant)
- Agender pride flag
- Flag of Ahrar al-Sham
- Flag of Alabama
- Flag of Alagoas
- Flag of Alberta
- Standard of the Lieutenant Governor of Alberta
- Standard of the lieutenant governor of Alberta (1907–1981)
- Flag of Alderney
- Flag of Alexandria
- Flag of Algeria
- Naval Ensign of Algeria
- Flag of Alphen aan den Rijn
- Flag of Altai
- Flag of Amapá
- Flag of Amazonas (Brazilian state)
- Flag of American Samoa
- Flag of Amsterdam
- Flag of Amur Oblast
- Flag of Andorra
- Flag of Anguilla
- Flag of Antigua and Barbuda
- Flag of the Arab League
- Flag of Argentina
- Civil Flag and Ensign of Argentina
- Naval Jack of Argentina
- Flag of Arkansas
- Flag of Arkhangelsk Oblast
- Flag of Aruba
- Flag of Astrakhan Oblast
- Flag of Australia
- Air Force Ensign of Australia
- Civil Aviation Ensign of Australia
- Civil Ensign of Australia
- Naval Ensign of Australia
- Flag of the Australian Capital Territory
- Flag of Austria
- State Flag of Austria
- Flag of Azerbaijan
- Flag of the Azores
- Civil Ensign of the Bahamas
- Naval Ensign of the Bahamas
- Flag of Bahia
- Flag of Bahrain
- Naval Ensign of Bangladesh
- Naval Ensign of Barbados
- Flag of Barcelona
- Flag of the Barisan Revolusi Nasional
- Flag of Bashkortostan
- Flag of the Basque Country
- Flag of the Kingdom of Bau (1867–1869)
- Flag of Bavaria (lozenge version)
- Flag of Bavaria (striped version)
- Flag of Belarus
- Flag of the President of Belarus
- Army Flag of Belgium
- Naval Ensign of Belgium
- Flag of Belize
- Flag of Berlin
- Flag of Bermuda
- Flag of Bhutan
- Flag of the Black Banner Organization
- Flag of Bosnia and Herzegovina
- Flag of Botswana
- Flag of Brazil
- Naval Jack of Brazil
- Flag of the British Antarctic Territory
- Flag of British Columbia
- Standard of the Lieutenant Governor of British Columbia
- Standard of the Lieutenant Governor of British Columbia (1871–1906)
- Standard of the Lieutenant Governor of British Columbia (1906–1982)
- British Empire flag (1910–1921)
- Flag of the British Indian Ocean Territory
- Flag of the British Virgin Islands
- Flag of Brittany
- Flag of Brunei
- Flag of Brussels
- Flag of Buckinghamshire
- Buddhist flag
- Flag of Bulgaria
- Flag of Burundi
- Flag of Buryatia
- Flag of California
- Flag of Cambodia
- Flag of Canada
- Flag of the Anglican Church of Canada
- Flag of the governor general of Canada
- Flag of the Grand Orange Lodge of Canada
- Flag of the Navy League of Canada
- Flag of the Royal Canadian Sea Cadets
- Flag of the Canadian Broadcasting Corporation
- Canadian Red Ensign (1957–1965)
- Flag of the Canary Islands
- Flag of Cape Breton Island
- Flag of Cape Verde
- Flag of the Cayman Islands
- Flag of Ceará
- Flag of the Central African Republic
- Flag of Chechnya
- Flag of Chile
- Naval Jack of Chile
- Ensign of the People's Liberation Army Navy
- Flag of the Republic of China
- Army Flag of the Republic of China
- Naval jack of the Republic of China
- Christian flag
- Flag of Christmas Island
- Flag of Colorado
- Flag of the Commonwealth of Independent States
- Flag of the Community of Portuguese Language Countries
- Flag of the Comoros
- Flag of Connecticut
- Flag of the Cook Islands
- Flag of Cornwall
- Flag of Corsica
- Flag of Costa Rica
- Flag of the Cretan State
- Flag of Croatia
- Naval Ensign of Croatia
- Flag of Cuba
- Flag of Cyprus
- Flag of the Czech Republic
- Flag of Delaware
- Flag of Denmark
- Naval Ensign of Denmark
- Royal Standard of Denmark
- State Flag and Ensign of Denmark
- Flag of Devon
- Flag of Djibouti
- Flag of Dominica
- Flag of the Dominican Republic
- Flag of Dorset
- Flag of the East African Community (shown here without its emblem)
- Flag of Egypt
- Air Force Flag of Egypt
- Army Flag of Egypt
- Naval Ensign of Egypt
- Naval Flag of Egypt
- Flag of El Salvador
- Flag of England
- Flag of Equatorial Guinea
- Presidential Flag of Eritrea
- Esperanto flag
- Flag of Espírito Santo
- Flag of Essex
- Flag of Estonia
- Naval Ensign of Estonia
- Naval Jack of Estonia
- Presidential Flag of Estonia
- Flag of Eswatini
- Flag of the Falkland Islands
- Flag of the Faroe Islands
- Flag of Federal District (Brazil)
- Flag of the Federation des Francophones de Terre-Neuve et du Labrador
- Flag of Fiji
- Civil Air Ensign of Fiji
- Civil Ensign of Fiji
- Civil Ensign of Fiji (pre 1970)
- Flag of the Colony of Fiji (1877–1883)
- Flag of the Colony of Fiji (1883–1903)
- Flag of the Colony of Fiji (1903–1908)
- Flag of the Colony of Fiji (1908–1924)
- Flag of the Colony of Fiji (1924–1970)
- Flag of the Confederacy of Independent Kingdoms of Fiji
- Customs Ensign of Fiji
- Customs Ensign of Fiji (1881–1966)
- Customs Ensign of Fiji (1970–1987)
- Flag of the Governor of Fiji (1877–1883)
- Flag of the Governor of Fiji (1883–1903)
- Flag of the Governor of Fiji (1903–1908)
- Flag of the Governor of Fiji (1908–1970)
- Flag of the Governor-General of Fiji (1970–1987)
- Flag of the Kingdom of Fiji (1871–1874)
- Civil Ensign of the Kingdom of Fiji (1871–1874)
- Naval Ensign of Fiji
- Royal Standard of Fiji (1871–1874)
- State Ensign of Fiji
- Flag of Finland
- Naval Jack of Finland
- Presidential Flag of Finland
- State Flag and Ensign of Finland
- War Flag and Naval Ensign of Finland
- Flag of Florida (Uruguay department)
- Flag of Florida (USA state)
- Flag of France
- Naval Ensign of France
- Franco-Albertan flag
- Flag of Franco-Columbians
- Franco-Ontarian flag
- Flag of French Polynesia
- Flag of the French Southern and Antarctic Lands
- Flag of Friesland
- Flag of Galicia
- Flag of the Gambia
- Flag of Georgia (country)
- Flag of Georgia (U.S. state)
- Naval ensign of Germany
- State flag of Germany
- Flag of Nazi Germany (1935–1945)
- Flag of Gibraltar
- Flag of Goiás
- Flag of Great Britain (1707–1801)
- Flag of Greece
- Naval Jack of Greece
- Presidential Flag of Greece
- Flag of Greenland
- Naval Ensign of Grenada
- Flag of Guam
- Flag of Guatemala
- Civil Flag and Ensign of Guatemala
- Flag of Guernsey
- Flag of Guyana
- Flag of the Council of the Haida Nation
- Flag of Haiti
- Flag of Hamas
- Flag of Hamburg
- Flag of Hawaii
- Flag of Herat (1818–1842)
- Flag of Hertfordshire
- Flag of Honduras
- Flag of Hong Kong
- Hudson's Bay Company flag
- Flag of Hungary
- Naval Ensign of Hungary
- Flag of Iceland
- Flag of Idaho
- Flag of Illinois
- Flag of India
- Flag of Indonesia
- Flag of Ingushetia
- Flag of Iowa
- Flag of Iran
- Flag of Iraq
- Flag of Ireland
- Presidential Standard of Ireland
- Islamic flag
- Flag of the Islamic State
- Flag of the Islamic State of Iraq
- Flag of the Isle of Man
- Flag of Israel
- Presidential Flag of Israel
- Flag of Italy
- Presidential Standard of Italy
- Flag of Ivory Coast
- Jain flag
- Flag of Jama'at al-Tawhid wal-Jihad
- Flag of Japan
- Flag of Jersey
- Flag of the Jewish Autonomous Oblast
- Jihadist flag
- The Jolly Roger
- Flag of Jordan
- Flag of Kabardino-Balkaria
- Flag of Kalmykia
- Flag of Kansas
- Flag of Karachay-Cherkessia
- Flag of Kent
- Flag of Kentucky
- Flag of Kenya
- Flag of Khakassia
- Flag of Kiribati
- Flag of Komi
- Flag of Krasnoyarsk Krai
- Flag of Kurdistan
- Flag of Kuwait
- Flag of Labrador
- Labrys lesbian flag
- Flag of Laos
- Flag of the Confederation of Lau (1869–1871)
- Flag of the king of Lau (1869–1871)
- Flag of Latvia
- Flag of Lebanon
- Flag of Leiden
- Flag of Lesotho
- Flag of Liberia
- Flag of Libya
- Flag of the City of London
- Flag of Louisiana
- Flag of Luxembourg
- Flag of Macau
- Flag of Madagascar
- Flag of Madeira
- Flag of the City of Madrid
- Flag of Maine
- Flag of Malaysia
- Flag of Maldives
- Flag of Malta
- Flag of Manitoba
- Flag of Maranhão
- Flag of Mari El
- Flag of the Marshall Islands
- Flag of Maryland
- Flag of Massachusetts
- Flag of Mato Grosso
- Flag of Mato Grosso do Sul
- Flag of Mexico
- Flag of Michigan
- Flag of Micronesia
- Flag of the Mi'kmaq Nation Grand Council
- Flag of Minas Gerais
- Flag of Minnesota
- Flag of Mississippi
- Flag of Missouri
- Flag of the Republic of Molossia
- Flag of Monaco
- Flag of Montana
- Flag of Montserrat
- Flag of Mordovia
- Flag of Moresnet
- Flag of Mozambique
- Flag of the Musqueam people
- Flag of Myanmar
- Flag of Namibia
- Flag of Nauru
- Flag of Nepal
- Flag of the Netherlands
- Flag of the Netherlands Antilles (1959–1986)
- Flag of Nevada
- Flag of New Brunswick
- Flag of Newfoundland and Labrador
- Newfoundland Tricolour
- Flag of New Hampshire
- Flag of New South Wales
- Flag of New York
- Flag of New York City
- Flag of New Zealand
- Air Force Ensign of New Zealand
- Civil Ensign of New Zealand
- Naval Ensign of New Zealand
- Flag of Nicaragua
- Flag of Niger
- Flag of Nigeria
- Flag of Niue
- Flag of Norfolk
- Flag of Norfolk Island
- Flag of the North Atlantic Treaty Organisation
- Flag of North Carolina
- Flag of North Dakota
- Flag of North Korea
- Flag of Northern Cyprus
- Flag of the Northern Mariana Islands
- Flag of the Northern Territory (Australia)
- Flag of the Northwest Territories
- Flag of Norway
- Royal Standard of Norway
- Flag of Nottinghamshire
- Flag of Nova Scotia
- Flag of Nunatsiavut
- Flag of Nunavut
- Flag of Oecusse District, Timor-Leste
- Flag of Ohio
- Flag of Oklahoma
- Olympic Flag
- Flag of Oman
- Flag of Ontario
- Standard of the Lieutenant Governor of Ontario (present)
- Standard of the Lieutenant Governor of Ontario (1870–1959 and 1965–1981)
- Standard of the Lieutenant Governor of Ontario (1959–1965)
- Flag of the Organisation of African Unity (1963–2002)
- Flag of the Organization of American States
- Flag of the Organization of Petroleum Exporting Countries
- Flag of Ossetia
- Flag of Pakistan
- Flag of Palestine
- Flag of Panama
- Flag of Papua New Guinea
- Flag of Pará
- Flag of Paraguay
- Flag of Paraíba
- Paralympic Flag
- Flag of Paraná (state)
- Flag of Patani United Liberation Organisation (original)
- Flag of Patani United Liberation Organisation (1989–2005)
- Flag of Patani United Liberation Organisation (2005–present)
- Flag of Pennsylvania
- Flag of Pernambuco
- Flag of Peru
- Flag of the Philippines
- Flag of Piauí
- Flag of the Pitcairn Islands
- Flag of Poland
- Presidential Flag of Poland
- Polyamory pride flag (2022 Red Howell version)
- Flag of Portugal
- Presidential Flag of Portugal
- Flag of Prince Edward Island
- Flag of Puerto Rico
- Flag of Qatar
- Flag of Quebec
- Flag of Queensland
- Flag of Rhode Island
- Flag of Rio de Janeiro
- Flag of Rio Grande do Norte
- Flag of Rio Grande do Sul
- Flag of Rondônia
- Flag of Roraima
- Flag of the Royal Military College of Canada
- Flag of Russia
- Presidential Flag of Russia
- Flag of the Sahrawi Arab Democratic Republic
- Flag of Saint Kitts and Nevis
- Flag of Saint Lucia
- Flag of Saint Petersburg
- Flag of Sakha
- Flag of Salt Lake City
- Flag of Samoa
- Flag of San Marino
- Flag of Santa Catarina (state)
- Flag of São Paulo (state)
- Flag of Sark
- Flag of Saskatchewan
- Standard of the Lieutenant Governor of Saskatchewan
- Flag of Saudi Arabia
- Flag of Saxony
- Flag of Scotland
- Flag of Scotland (color variation)
- Flag of Scotland (color variation)
- Flag of the Church of Scotland
- Scottish Union Jack
- Principality of Sealand
- Flag of Seborga
- Flag of Serbia
- Flag of Serbia and Montenegro (1992–2006)
- Flag of the Serbian Orthodox Church
- Flag of Sergipe
- Flag of Seychelles
- Flag of the Shetland Islands
- Flag of Sierra Leone
- Flag of Singapore
- Flag of Slovakia
- Flag of Slovenia
- Flag of the Solomon Islands
- Flag of Somalia
- Flag of Somaliland
- Flag of South Africa
- Flag of South Australia
- Flag of South Carolina
- Flag of South Dakota
- Flag of South Georgia and the South Sandwich Islands
- Flag of South Korea
- Flag of South Sudan
- Flag and coat of arms of the Sovereign Military Order of Malta
- Royal Standard of Spain
- Flag of Stirling
- Flag of Sudan
- Flag of Suriname
- Flag of Switzerland
- Flag of Switzerland (Color variant)
- Flag of Syria
- Flag of Tajikistan
- Flag of Tasmania
- Flag of Tatarstan
- Flag of the Kingdom of Tavolara
- Flag of Tennessee
- Flag of Texas
- Flag of Thailand
- Flag of the Canton of Thurgau
- Flag of Tibet
- Flag of Timor-Leste
- Flag of Tocantins
- Flag of Togo
- Flag of Tokelau
- Flag of Tonga
- Royal Standard of Tonga
- Flag of Trinidad and Tobago
- Flag of Tristan da Cunha
- Flag of Tunisia
- Flag of Turkey
- Presidential Flag of Turkey
- Flag of Turkmenistan
- Flag of the Turks and Caicos Islands
- Flag of Tuva
- Flag of Tuvalu
- Flag of Udmurtia
- Flag of Uganda
- Flag of the United Arab Emirates
- Flag of the United Kingdom
- Air Force Ensign of the United Kingdom
- UK Blue Ensign
- Naval Ensign of the United Kingdom
- UK Red Ensign
- Royal standard of the United Kingdom
- Flag of the United Nations
- Flag of the United States
- Flag of the United States Air Force
- Flag of the United States Army
- Flag of the United States Bureau of Fisheries (1903–1940)
- Flag of the United States Bureau of Navigation (1884–1946)
- Flag of the United States Coast and Geodetic Survey (1899–1970)
- Flag of the United States Coast Guard
- Flag of the United States Environmental Science Services Administration (1965–1970)
- Flag of the United States Fish and Wildlife Service
- Flag of the United States National Oceanic and Atmospheric Administration
- Flag of the United States Navy
- Flag of United States Marine Corps
- Flag of Uruguay
- Flag of Utah (2011–2024)
- Flag of Uzbekistan
- Flag of Vancouver Island
- Flag of Vatican City
- Flag of the Canton of Vaud
- Flag of Venezuela
- Flag of Vermont
- Flag of Victoria
- Ensign of the Vietnam People's Navy
- Flag of Virginia
- Flag of the United States Virgin Islands
- Flag of Wake Island (unofficial)
- Flag of Wales
- Flag of Washington
- Flag of Washington (1923-1967)
- Flag of Washington, D.C.
- Flag of West Virginia
- Flag of Western Australia
- Flag of the Western European Union (1995–2011)
- Flag of Winnipeg
- Flag of Wisconsin
- Flag of Wyoming
- Flag of Yemen
- Flag of Yorkshire
- Flag of Yukon
- Flag of the Commissioner of Yukon
- Flag of Zimbabwe

== Gray ==
- Agender pride flag
- Flag of Alberta
- Standard of the Lieutenant Governor of Alberta
- Standard of the lieutenant governor of Alberta (1907–1981)
- Flag of the Royal Military College of Canada
- Flag of Coclé Province
- Flag of the Colony of Fiji (1877–1883)
- Flag of the Colony of Fiji (1883–1903)
- Flag of the Colony of Fiji (1903–1908)
- Flag of the Governor of Fiji (1877–1883)
- Flag of the Governor of Fiji (1883–1903)
- Flag of the Governor of Fiji (1903–1908)
- Flag of the Governor-General of Fiji (1970–1987)
- Flag of the Kingdom of Fiji (1871–1874)
- Civil Ensign of the Kingdom of Fiji (1871–1874)
- Royal Standard of Fiji (1871–1874)
- Flag of the Islamic State of Iraq
- Flag of Nunatsiavut
- Flag of Santiago Metropolitan Region
- Flag of Uganda
- Flag of Vancouver Island
- Flag of Yukon
- Flag of the Commissioner of Yukon

== See also ==
- List of flags
- List of flags by color combination
