= Flag of Madrid =

Flag of Madrid may refer to:

- Flag of the City of Madrid
- Flag of the Community of Madrid
