= Flag of Hertfordshire =

Flag of English county

Hertfordshire
- Proportion: 3:5
- Adopted: 19 November 2008
- Designed by: College of Arms

The flag of Hertfordshire is the flag of the English county of Hertfordshire. It features eight alternating white and blue wavy lines, and a yellow shield with a stag on it.

The flag is a banner of the arms of Hertfordshire County Council, in turn based on the arms of Hertford. On 19 November 2008 the Council passed a resolution that the design is a fitting and proper emblem for the county and its people. The council subsequently registered the banner of arms as the flag of the county with the Flag Institute and it now appears on the latter's registry of local flags.

== Design ==
The eight alternating blue and white wavy lines, a traditional heraldic representation of a water course, symbolise the county's many rivers while the shield and hart are taken from the arms of the Borough of Hertford. It is a heraldic pun of Hart and ford. The Hart reclines on a yellow field, representing Saint Alban, the patron saint of Hertfordshire and first British martyr, whose cross is traditionally yellow on blue.

The flag is in a 3:5 ratio.

=== Colours ===
Scheme	Blue	White	Yellow	Brown
Refs				
Pantone (paper)	300 C	Safe	116 C	1405 C
HEX	#005eb8	#FFFFFF	#ffcd00	#6e4c1e
CMYK	100, 49, 0, 28	0, 0, 0, 0	0, 20, 100, 0	0, 31, 73, 57
RGB	0, 94, 184	255, 255, 255	255, 204, 0	110, 76, 30

== History ==
=== Arms of Hertford ===
The coat of arms of Hertford is one of the earlier precursors of this design. First recorded being used in the 17th century, and officially granted on 20th October 1937, the arms show the hart sitting on top of the wavy lines representing water, rather than over them. This arms also had another animal - ermine lions, a reference to the arms of the Marquess of Salisbury, as The Cecil Lords Salisbury have, with one exception, held the office of High Steward of the former Borough since 1605. They are canting arms, as a hart sitting on top of a ford is a pun on the pronounced name of the town.

The stag imagery is used frequently in symbols of the area such as in the logos of many modern Hertfordshire-based organisations, and the arms of Hertford also contain a stag's head in a wreath at the top, and the motto at the bottom reads: "PRIDE IN OUR PAST, FAITH IN OUR FUTURE".

Coat of arms of the Hertfordshire County Council, on which the flag is based

=== Council arms and use as flag ===
The banner of arms of Hertfordshire County Council was granted in 1925 for sole use of the body. It features the design now used for the flag on the central shield, which is inspired by the escutcheon in the arms of Hertford. The shield is flanked by two stags standing, each with Saint Alban's Cross chained around their necks, and a crown sits atop the shield. The motto of Hertfordshire runs across the bottom, reading "TRUST AND FEAR NOT".

This arms was, from its inception only permitted for use by the council itself. Prior to 2008, there was no agreed symbol for Hertfordshire that was available for public use, and at a 2004 flag parade in the county that featured the banners of various local parishes, the event's organiser Richard Walduck noted:

I am absolutely amazed that Hertfordshire does not have its own flag. We would welcome ideas and support from Hertfordshire residents and businesses to help design and produce a Hertfordshire flag to lead the Parade of Flags event at next year’s Herts County Show.

The following resolution was passed by Robert Gordon, local council leader, later that year:

This Council has, for the better representation of the County of Hertfordshire and its people, decided that the banner of the County Council’s arms, namely ‘Barry wavy of eight Azure and Argent an Inescutcheon Or charged with a Hart lodged proper’ is a fitting and proper emblem for the county and its people and will from this day be the County flag of Hertfordshire. The use of the full achievement of arms, with supporters and mural crown as a crest, is still restricted to the County Council and those specifically authorised by it.

In 2011, Secretary of State Eric Pickles began an initiative of display local county flags alongside the Union Jack to give them more visibility. This was on the anniversary of the first written record of Hertfordshire in the Anglo-Saxon Chronicle and the flag was flown outside the headquarters of the Ministry of Housing, Communities and Local Government in Victoria.

== Other flags ==
=== St Alban's cross ===
St Alban's cross

The Saint Alban's Cross is a yellow saltire on a blue field (azure a saltire or). It is found in several flags, notably that of the Cathedral and Abbey Church of St Alban, previously a Benedictine monastery, and the city of St Albans, Hertfordshire. It is the heraldic emblem that is commonly attributed to the Anglo-Saxon Kingdom of Mercia.

The flag appears on shields chained around the necks of the stags on the coat of arms of Hertfordshire, and on the arms of Mercian towns, including Tamworth, Leek and Blaby. Display of the Saint Alban's Cross in flags is modern. Such flags are flown from Tamworth Castle.
