= Flag of Alagoas =

- Use: Civil and state flag
- Proportion: 67:100
- Adopted: 23 September 1963
- Design: A vertical tricolor of red, white, and blue, with the coat of arms of Alagoas in the centre.

The flag of the Brazilian state of Alagoas was created by State Law of Alagoas No. 2628 on 23 September 1963. The colors (red, white, and blue) refer to the French Tricolor, symbolizing the ideals of the French Revolution: liberté, égalité, fraternité.

== Symbolism ==
The coat of arms symbolizes the first city of Porto Calvo.

The three shells represent the three historic villages of the state, present-day Porto Calvo, Marechal Deodoro, and Penedo.

The three fish represent the three main and largest lagoons of the then-town: Mundaú, Manguaba, and Jequiá, and also represent fishing. The green bouquets in the center of the flag depict sugarcane and cotton.

The five-pointed silver star is a Brazilian heraldic tradition and refers to the star on the coat of arms of Brazil. It also refers to the Hino de Alagoas (pt), which refers to the state as a "bright star" (Portuguese: estrela radiosa).

Unofficial flag of Alagoas.

Old flag of Alagoas (1894–1963).
