= Presidential standard of Germany =

Fifth presidential standard (mod. 1950), in use since 20 January 1950

The presidential standard of Germany (German: Standarte des Bundespräsidenten der Bundesrepublik Deutschland) is the distinctive standard of the presence of the president of the Federal Republic of Germany.

The Weimar-era presidential standard from 1921 was adopted again by a decision by President Theodor Heuss on 20 January 1950, when he also formally adopted other Weimar-era state symbols including the coat of arms. The eagle (Reichsadler, now called Bundesadler) in the design that was used in the coat of arms and presidential standard in the Weimar Republic and today was originally introduced by a decision by President Friedrich Ebert on 11 November 1919.

Therefore, it flies above the Bellevue Palace, when the president is in residence or travelling in another part of Germany. It is taken down only when the president resides at Villa Hammerschmidt in Bonn, if he has designated another place in Germany as his official residence, or when he is abroad.

== Description ==
The president of the Federal Republic of Germany has an official standard. The current version is based on the coat of arms and the second presidential standard.

== Historical evolution of the standard ==
First presidential standard (mod. 1919)
(27 September 1919 – 11 April 1921)

Second presidential standard (mod. 1921)
(11 April 1921 – 5 May 1926)

Third presidential standard (mod. 1926)
(5 May 1926 – 22 April 1933)

Fourth presidential standard (mod. 1933)
(22 April 1933 – 11 April 1935)

== See also ==
- Coat of arms of Germany
- Flag of Germany
- List of German flags § Standards
- National symbols of Germany
