= Flag of Acadiana =

Acadiana
- Other names: Acadiana flag, Cajun flag
- Use: Other
- Proportion: 2∶3
- Adopted: July 5, 1974 (52 years ago)
- Design: Two equal horizontal bands of blue (top) and red (bottom) bearing three white fleurs de lis and a gold castle, respectively, and a white isosceles triangle at the hoist, within which is a gold five-pointed star.
- Designed by: Dr. Thomas J. Arceneaux

The flag of Acadiana (drapeau de l'Acadiane) represents the Acadiana (Cajun) ethnic region of southern Louisiana. It consists of two equal horizontal bands of blue (top) and red (bottom) bearing three white fleurs de lis and a gold castle, respectively, and a white isosceles triangle at the hoist, within which is a gold five-pointed star. It was designed in 1965 and officially adopted July 5, 1974. The flag is referred to as the Acadiana flag or Cajun flag.

== History ==
The flag was designed in 1965 by Dr. Thomas J. Arceneaux of the University of Southwestern Louisiana (present day University of Louisiana at Lafayette), who derived it from the Southwestern Louisiana Institute seal. He was an early proponent of the Louisiana French Renaissance Movement, a movement designed to renew interest and pride in the French-Acadian heritage, language, and culture of Louisiana. On July 5, 1974, the State Legislature passed House Concurrent Resolution No. 143 adopting Dr. Arceneaux's design as the official flag of Acadiana.

== Symbolism ==
The various symbols on the flag were each chosen to represent a special aspect of Cajun culture and history. The golden star surrounded by a field of white serves as a symbol of Acadian exiles in America and alludes to their Roman Catholic heritage. The golden star in particular refers to the Virgin Mary. The fleurs de lis set against a background of blue represent the French ancestry of the Cajuns. The golden castle set upon a field of red represents Spanish colonial rule of Louisiana, the rule during which the exiled Acadians arrived.

== Proposed replacements ==
While Acadiana derives its name from its Acadian/Cajun population, it is also a legally defined region of 22 parishes which contain large non-Cajun populations. In most Acadiana parishes, African Americans make up between 20 and 40 percent of the population; one parish, St. John the Baptist Parish, is majority African American.

Some residents have expressed concerns that the flag, by highlighting French and Spanish heritage, excludes the region's large Black population. In 2018, University of Louisiana professor Rick Swanson proposed two potential replacement Acadiana flags. One recolors the white triangle yellow and the gold star green to represent the West African origins of most local African Americans. The second reorients the three fields into vertical stripes.

Swanson's proposal generated fierce pushback. He responded that the flag was meant to represent the region, not the Cajun ethnic group: "We’re unique in the sense that we have a very strong regional identity, but we don’t have a flag that was designed specifically for the purpose of representing all of the heritages that contribute to that unique regional identity."

== See also ==
- Flag of Acadia
- Flag of the Philippines
- List of flags by design
