= Flag of Amazonas (Brazilian state) =

- Use: Civil and state flag
- Proportion: 15:21 (reduced to 5:7)
- Adopted: 14 January 1982 (updated 14 July 2026)
- Design: Three horizontal stripes of equal length in white, red, and white. A blue canton over the white stripe on the hoist-side, with sixty-two five-pointed silver stars, in seven rows. In the center is a star larger than the others.

The flag of Amazonas is one of the official symbols of the state of Amazonas in Brazil.

== History ==
The original flag of the state was introduced by Decree No. 1513, of 14 January 1982, which officially defined its proportions, colours, symbolism, and usage guidelines, revoking Decree 900, of 7 December 1970. The Decree also made teaching of its design and meaning mandatory in every public and private teaching institution, determined the official showing of its characteristics and created examples to serve as a model for its reproduction.

In its original version, the flag had 25 silver stars on a canton azure, representing the municipalities existing on 4 August 1897, date in which the Amazonas Military entered the War of Canudos. Of the stars, a larger star, placed at the centre of the canton, would represent Manaus. The other 24 smaller stars represented the other historical municipalities.

On 14 July 2026, Decree 8469 altered Decree 1514/1982, updating the canton to have 62 stars instead of 24, now representing the current number of municipalities. The change preserved the general design, proportions, colour and symbolism, only tweaking the quantity, placement and administrative meaning of the stars, as well as updating the official document including the flag's construction sheet.

== Symbolism ==
The sixty-two stars in the upper left corner represent the sixty-two municipalities of the state. The largest star, in the center, represents the capital, Manaus. The two horizontal white bands represent hope, the dark blue of the quadratic drawing, the skies and the red band represents overcoming difficulties.

The former flag of Amazonas, before 14 July 2026

The reverse of the flag of Amazonas (the hoist is to the right)

Unofficial flag led by the Military Forces of Amazonas into the War of Canudos (1897)

Flag proposed during the government of Danilo Duarte de Matos Areosa (pt) (1967–1971). The current flag was adopted instead.

Flag of the governor of Amazonas, with the coat of arms in the center.
