= Flag of Vancouver Island =

Unofficial regional flag for Vancouver Island

Vancouver Island
- Use: Other
- Proportion: 1:2
- Adopted: Re-created 1988
- Design: A Blue Ensign with the badge of the Colony of Vancouver Island on a white disk on the fly.

The flag of Vancouver Island is a defaced Blue Ensign with the Union Flag in the canton and the badge of the colony of Vancouver Island on a white disk on the fly. The design of this flag is based on the rules set out by the Admiralty for colonial flags in 1865, and on elements from the great seal of the colony of Vancouver Island, established in 1849. However the flag itself likely never existed during this period; rather Michael Halleran re-designed it in 1988 as an unofficial local flag for Vancouver Island (now part of British Columbia, Canada).

== Great Seal of the Island of Vancouver and its Dependencies ==
The distinguishing badge on the fly (right hand side) of the flag of Vancouver Island is based on the great seal of the colony, officially called the Island of Vancouver and its Dependencies. This was designed in 1849/50 in London by Benjamin Wyon (1802-1858), Chief Engraver of Her Majesty's Seals. The seal is on the classic pattern of British colonial seals from the Nineteenth Century, and combines the Royal Arms of Queen Victoria in the top third of the image with the symbols designed for the colony in a highly stylised shield or badge on the bottom two thirds. The principal symbols of the badge are Trident of Neptune and the Caduceus (or wand) of Mercury crossed in saltire. These represent the Pacific island colony's relationship with the sea and with trade respectively. Above this is set a pinecone, and below is a beaver sitting on a small island surrounded by calm water. These represent the forest and other natural resources of the colony and perhaps also the early connection of the colony to the Hudson's Bay Company (who also bore beavers on their arms). The seal was only in use from the time of its creation until the union of Vancouver Island with its neighbouring colony on the mainland, British Columbia, in 1866. Aside from their use on the flag of Vancouver Island these symbols have, however, lived on, with a similar version of the British Royal Arms and colonial badge being featured on the masthead of the Victoria Times Colonist newspaper, which originates from the colonial period.

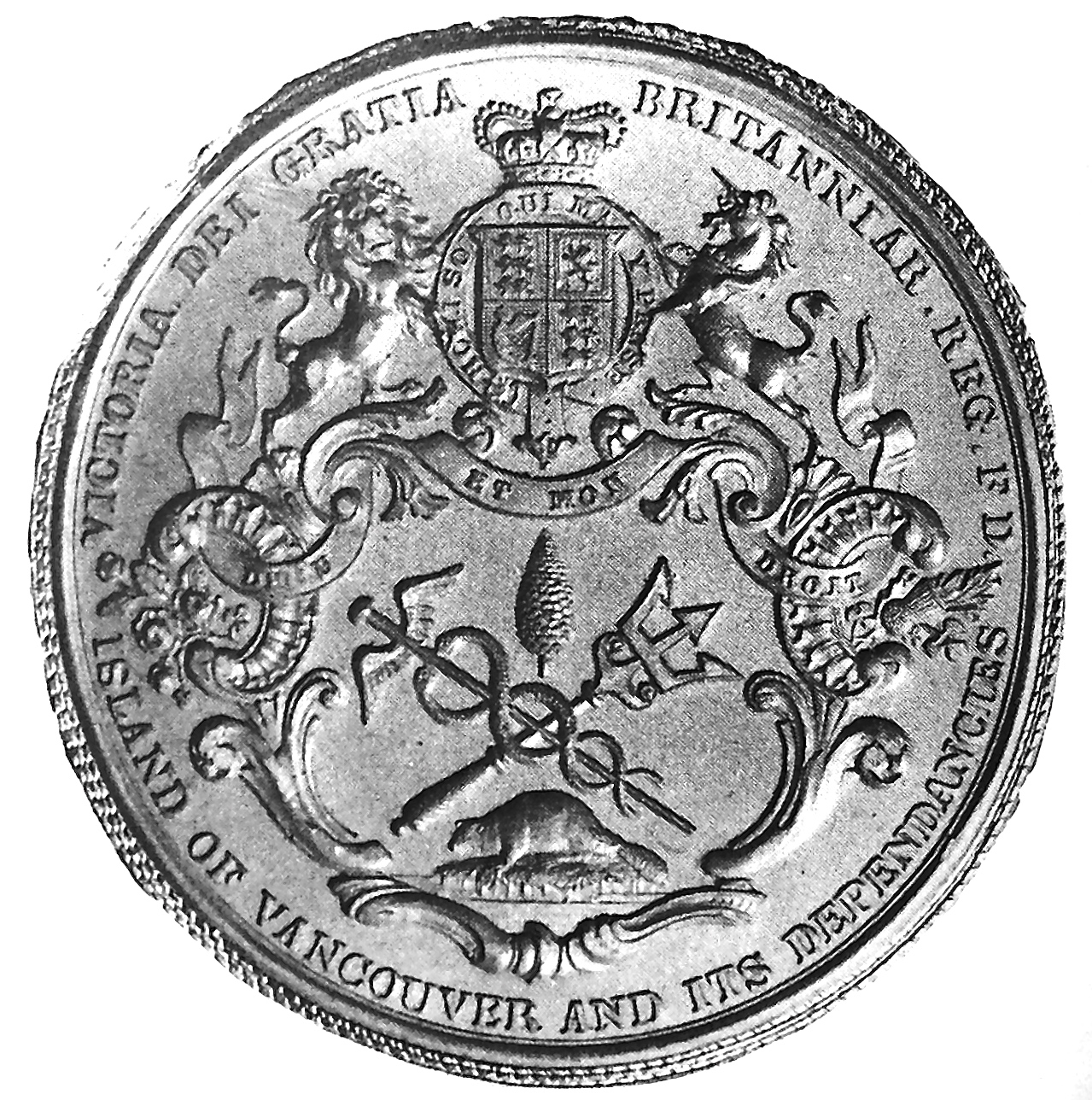
The Great Seal of the Island of Vancouver and its Dependencies was designed by Benjamin Wyon, Chief Engraver of Her Majesty's Seals, c1849.

== 1865 Admiralty Regulations for Colonial Flags ==
In 1865 the British Admiralty issued regulations for flags flown by British and British colonial ships. In this they directed colonial governments to fly ensigns with the badge of their colony on the fly to distinguish their vessels from ships of the Royal Navy and other British government vessels. This regulation, titled 'Circular No. 4, Colonial Colours', directed British colonial governments to fly "the Blue Ensign, with the Seal or Badge of the Colony in the fly thereof…" This regulation was issued late in 1865, and less than a year later the colony was merged with its mainland neighbour, hence it is highly unlikely that this flag ever flew during the colonial period, and indeed no contemporary examples or descriptions of a unique Vancouver island flag are known.

== Popular revival ==
The flag of Vancouver Island existed only theoretically until 1988 when an amateur scholar, Michael Halleran, connected the design of the Great Seal of the colony with the Admiralty regulation of 1865 and determined that the colonial government had been entitled to fly its own flag. In conjunction with a private flag manufacturer in Victoria, Vancouver Island, he combined the elements of the conventional British Blue Ensign and the symbols of Vancouver Island from the great seal, creating a flag which conforms to standard British practices from the period when Vancouver Island was a separate colony.

Since 1988 the flag of Vancouver Island has been manufactured for private sale. Initially, it was not much more than an historical oddity; however, in recent years and according to a number of local and national news articles, the flag has begun to fly more widely, and can be seen flying around Vancouver island as well as on the many ships that ply its waters.

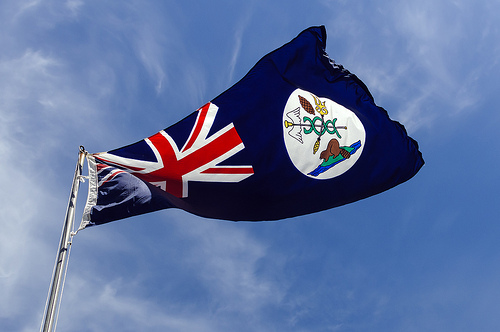
A modern nylon version of the flag of Vancouver Island
