= Flag of Rio de Janeiro =

São Sebastião do Rio de Janeiro
- Use: Civil and state flag
- Proportion: 7:10
- Adopted: July 8, 1908
- Design: A white rectangle with a blue saltire behind the city's coat of arms displayed red in the center

The flag of the City of Rio de Janeiro or flag of São Sebastião do Rio de Janeiro (English: flag of Saint Sebastian of Rio de Janeiro) consists of a white rectangle with a blue saltire behind the coat of arms of the city of Rio de Janeiro, which is displayed red in the center. Its basic design has changed little since it was adopted on July 8, 1908, except during period from 1960 to 1975 when the municipality of Rio de Janeiro was known as Guanabara State. It resembles the flags of Galicia (before it changed) and the Russian Navy (with some changes).

== Composition ==
The flag of the City of Rio de Janeiro is a white field with two blue stripes, placed diagonally, forming a band and a bar (that is, in the shape of a saltire, or a St. Andrew's cross). On the crossing of the band and the bar, the city's coat of arms—a sixth in proportion to the total field—appears in red. The city's coat of arms has the following heraldic composition: on a red field, there are three silver arrows surmounted by a silver armillary sphere, and over all a silver Phrygian cap. Supporting the shield are two red dolphins, holding at their right a laurel branch and at their left an oak branch. The crest of the shield is a mural crown of five towers, also red.

The tinctures, or heraldic colors, of the coat of arms on this shield are altered from the traditional coat of arms, which has a blue field, golden arrows and sphere, and a red Phrygian cap. The dolphins are normally silver, the leaves they hold green, and the mural crown gold.

The blue and white of the flag symbolize the Portuguese origin of the city, as they are the traditional colors of the Portuguese monarchy, adopted since the creation of the County of Portugal in 1097 (it was only after the proclamation of the Portuguese Republic on October 5, 1910 that Portugal began to use the colors dark green and red on their flag). The color red on the flag of Rio de Janeiro symbolizes the blood shed by Saint Sebastian, the saintly patron of the city, as well as the blood shed by the city's founder, Estácio de Sá, and the early settlers of Rio de Janeiro.

== History ==
1808

1822

Neutral Municipality (1831-1889)

Federal District of Brazil (1908–1957)

Federal District of Brazil (1957–1960), current city flag

State of Guanabara (1960–1975)
