= Flag of Amur Oblast =

Flag of Amur Oblast

The flag of Amur Oblast in the Russian Far East was adopted on 16 April 1999. The lower part of the flag (1/3 of the width) is blue in colour and is separated from the upper part by a white serpentine belt, reminiscent of a river wave. The width of the belt is 1/15 the width of the flag. The upper part of the flag is red, symbolizing the rich history of the Amur region. The ratio of the flag is 2:3.

== Other flags ==
=== Administrative Divisions ===
Flag	Date	Use	Description
	?–present	Flag of Blagoveshchensk	
	?–present	Flag of Belogorsk	
	?–present	Flag of Zeya	
	?–present	Flag of Raychikhinsk	
	?–present	Flag of Svobodny	
	?–present	Flag of Tynda	
	?–present	Flag of Shimanovsk	
	?–present	Flag of Arkharinsky District	
	?–present	Flag of Belogorsky District	
	?–present	Flag of Blagoveshchensky District	
	?–present	Flag of Zavitinsky District	
	?–present	Flag of Zeysky District	
	?–present	Flag of Konstantinovsky District	
	?–present	Flag of Mazanovsky District	
	?–present	Flag of Mikhaylovsky District	
	?–present	Flag of Oktyabrsky District	
	?–present	Flag of Romnensky District	
	?–present	Flag of Svobodnensky District	
	?–present	Flag of Selemdzhinsky District	
	?–present	Flag of Seryshevsky District	
	?–present	Flag of Skovorodinsky District	
	?–present	Flag of Tambovsky District	
	?–present	Flag of Tyndinsky District	
	?–present	Flag of Shimanovsky District	

=== Settlements ===
Flag	Date	Use	Description
	?–present	Flag of Yekaterinoslavka	
