= Flag of Khakassia =

Flag of the Russian republic of Khakassia

Khakassia
- Proportion: 1:2
- Adopted: 25 September 2003
- Design: A blue-white-red horizontal tricolour with a vertical band on the hoist containing a traditional yellow sun device, which also appears on the flag of the Khakas people.
- Designed by: Gennady Afrikanovich Vyatkin and Sergey Andreevich Donskov

The flag of Khakassia (Note: Russian: Государственный Флаг Республики Хакасия; Khakas: Хакас Республиказының Хазнаның Туғ) is used by the Republic of Khakassia, a federal subject of Russia. It consists of a blue-white-red horizontal tricolour with a green vertical band on the hoist containing a traditional yellow sun device. The ratio of the flag is 1:2 and it was adopted on 25 September 2003.

== History ==
During Soviet rule, Khakassia existed as the Khakas Autonomous Oblast and did not have its own flag. In February 1992, after the fall of the Soviet Union, Khakassia became one of the republics of Russia, and on 6 June 1992, Khakassia adopted its first flag. The earliest version of the flag of Khakassia was similar to the current one, but the sun on the hoist was black and the colours of the tricolour were white-blue-red, similar to the flag of Russia. On 23 December 1993, the colour of the sun was changed from black to yellow.

The usage of the Russian flag on regional flags is forbidden in Russia, but Khakassia was granted exception to the rule as its flag was designed before the law was passed. Despite being exempt from the rule, on 25 September 2003 the order of the stripes on the flag of Khakassia was changed from white-blue-red to blue-white-red, so that the order of the stripes no longer mimicked the Russian flag.

== Flags ==
=== Historical flags ===
| Flag | Date | Use | Description |
|---|---|---|---|
| | 1992–1993 | Former flag of Khakassia | |
| | 1993–2002 | Former flag of Khakassia | |
| | 2002–2003 | Former flag of Khakassia | |

=== Administrative flags ===
| Flag | Date | Use | Description |
|---|---|---|---|
| | ?–present | Flag of Abakan | |
| | ?–present | Flag of Abaza | |
| | 2004–present | Flag of Sayanogorsk | |
| | ?–2004 | Flag of Sayanogorsk | |
| | ?–present | Flag of Sorsk | |
| | ?–present | Flag of Chernogorsk | |
| | ?–present | Flag of Altaysky District | |
| | ?–present | Flag of Askizsky District | |
| | 2013–present | Flag of Beysky District | |
| | 2010–present | Flag of Bogradsky District | |
| | ?–2010 | Flag of Bogradsky District | |
| | ?–present | Flag of Tashtypsky District | |
| | ?–present | Flag of Ust-Abakansky District | |
| | 2012–present | Flag of Shirinsky District | |
| | ?–2012 | Flag of Shirinsky District | |
