= Flags of the Egyptian Armed Forces =

Military flags of Egypt

The several branches of the Egyptian Armed Forces are represented by flags, among other emblems and insignia. Within each branch, various flags fly on various occasions, and on various ships, bases, camps and military academies.

In general, the order of precedence when displaying military flags together is Air Defense, Air Force, Navy and the Army.

== Current ==
Flag	Date	Use	Description
	1984–present	War flag of Egypt	The flag of Egypt with two crossed swords in white in the canton
			Logo of the official military spokesman for the armed forces
	1984–present	Flag of the Egyptian Navy	The flag of Egypt in the canton on a blue field with the two crossed white anchor surrounded by a wreath at the fly
	1984–present	Naval ensign and jack of Egypt	The flag of Egypt with two crossed anchors in white in the canton
		Masthead pennant of the Egyptian Navy	
		Flag of an Egyptian Vice-admiral	
		Flag of an Egyptian Rear-admiral	
		Senior on the roads flag	
			Emblem of the Egyptian Navy
	1984–present	Air force ensign of Egypt	The flag of Egypt in the canton on a sky blue field with the roundel at the fly
	1972–present	Roundel of the Egyptian Air Force	
	1984–present	Fin flash of the Egyptian Air Force	
			Emblem of the Egyptian Air Force
		Flag of the Egyptian Air Defense Forces	

== See also ==
- Flag of Egypt
- List of Egyptian flags
- Egyptian Air Defense Forces
- Egyptian Air Force
- Egyptian Navy
- Egyptian Army
- Military Technical College (Egypt)
