= Flag of Acre =

- Use: Civil and state flag
- Proportion: 7:10
- Adopted: 22 December 1995
- Design: Rectangle divided by a diagonal line from the bottom left (hoist-side) to the upper right. The top left is yellow with a red star in the corner, and the bottom right is green.

The current state flag of Acre was introduced by Law No. 1170 of 22 December 1995 (pt), adopting the design of the flag of the Republic of Acre (Decree No. 2 of 15 July 1899), as modified by Resolution No. 5 of 24 January 1921. The faixa governamental used by the Chief Executive of Acre is made up of the colors of the flag, and also boasts the red star.

Its design consists of a rectangle ratio of width-length 7:10, divided by a diagonal line from the bottom left (hoist-side) to the upper right. The top left is yellow with a red star in the corner, and the bottom right is green.

== Symbolism ==
The main colors of the flag (green and yellow) are the same as the flag of Brazil and represent the state's integration with Brazil. Independently, each color has the following meaning:

- The yellow represents the riches of the earth;
- The green represents hope.

The red star in the upper left, called the "Altaneira Star", represents the blood of those who fought for the annexation of the current state of Acre to Brazil. The flag was officially adopted by the governor Epaminondas Jácome (pt).

11:20 Flag of the Independent State of Acre (1899–1900).

11:20 Flag of the Third Republic of Acre (1902–1903).

7:10 Flag of Acre (reverse).

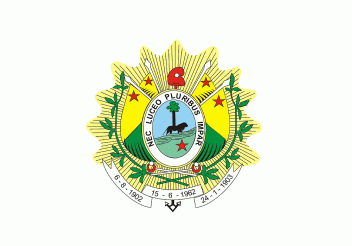
Flag-insignia of the Governor of the State of Acre.
