= Flag of Amapá =

Brazilian state flag

- Use: Civil and state flag
- Proportion: 7:10
- Adopted: 5 October 1988
- Design: A horizontal tricolor of blue, green with black-edged white lines, and yellow, with a green triangle based on the hoist-side, bearing a stylized outline of the Fortaleza de São José de Macapá in black and white. The green triangle continues as a horizontal stripe to the fly end.

The current state flag of Amapá was introduced by Decree No. 8 of 23 April 1984.

== History ==
Prior to the creation of the Amapá territory, the area was disputed between France and Brazil. Known variously as the Republic of Counani (1886–1887), and the Free State of Counani (1904–1912), these territories were never internationally recognized, and ultimately quelled by the governments of France and Brazil.

The Federal Territory of Amapá established its own flag, which was used after the state's creation on 5 October 1988, and established by Decree No. 8 of 23 April 1984. However, due to disputes at the time, a tripartite version of the state flag of Pará, showing the fort of São José, was popularly used. This version only ceased to be used during the administration of Aníbal Barcelos.

The flag was chosen by a commission created under Decree No. 4 of 30 January 1984 during the governorship of Aníbal Barcelos.

== Symbolism ==
Each of the flag's colors have specific meanings. The green represents the forests, which make up 90% of the state's territory, as well as hope, the future, love, liberty, and abundance. The yellow represents the federal union and the state's rich soil. The blue represents justice and the sky. The white represents peach, purity, and the desire of its residents to live in harmony with one another. The black stripe represents those who died fighting for the region's independence.

The centralized geometric figure on the hoist-side represents the Fortaleza de São José de Macapá.

Flag of the Federal Territory of Amapá (1984–1991).

Proposal for flag of the Federal Territory of Amapá (1984). Never adopted.

Flag of the Republic of Counani (1886–1887).

Flag of the Free State of Counani (1887–1904)

Flag of the Free State of Counani (1904–1912)
