= Saint Alban's Cross =

Yellow saltire on a blue field

Cross of St Alban

Flag of Mercia (Flag Institute)

First cultural flag of Cape Breton Island, Canada (1940's)

The Saint Alban's Cross is a yellow saltire on a blue field (azure a saltire or). It is found in several flags, notably that of the Cathedral and Abbey Church of St Alban, previously a Benedictine monastery, and the city of St Albans, Hertfordshire.

It is the heraldic emblem that is commonly attributed to the Anglo-Saxon Kingdom of Mercia. A saltire is attributed to Mercia in College of Arms Ms. L.14, dating from the reign of Henry III (d. 1272). The arms were subsequently used by the Abbey of St Albans. With the dissolution of the Abbey and the incorporation of the borough of St Albans the device was used on the town's corporate seal and was officially recorded as the arms of the town at an heraldic visitation in 1634. The cross has also been incorporated into a number of coats of arms, such as Hertfordshire county council and those of Mercian towns, including Tamworth, Leek and Blaby. Display of the Saint Alban's Cross in flags is modern. Such flags are flown from Tamworth Castle. The flag was flown outside Birmingham Council House during 2009 while the Staffordshire Hoard was on display in the city, and is shown in street signs in Tamworth, the "ancient capital of Mercia".

It is possible that the colours of the cross and connection with Saint Alban is partly through a link with Saint Andrew; a chapel of Saint Andrew was from an early period attached to the Abbey of Saint Alban, and this may be part of the origin of the design.

The darker variant of the Cross of St Alban was officially registered by the Flag Institute as the Flag of Mercia in 2014. The Flag Institute's own rules do not allow an identical flag being recognised for two different polities, and since the Cross of St Alban had already been registered for the City of St Albans, it could not be used for Mercia. Eventually the Institute decided to adopt the darker variant, as this tends to better match actual flags flown to represent Mercia, such as the one on Tamworth Castle.

St Alban's Cross also appears on the original cultural flag of Cape Breton Island, an island in the Canadian province of Nova Scotia.

== See also ==
- Mercia#Symbolism_and_attributed_heraldry
