= Flag of Buckinghamshire =

Flag of English county

Buckinghamshire
- Proportion: 3:5
- Adopted: ancient
- Designed by: Traditional

The flag of Buckinghamshire is the flag of the historic county of Buckinghamshire in England. It has been in use for centuries and flew from County Hall in Aylesbury. The flag was registered with the Flag Institute on 20 May 2011.

== Design ==
This is the traditional flag of Buckinghamshire which features a chained swan (The Bohun swan) on a bicolour of red and black, taken from the arms of Bucks. The swan emblem dates back to Anglo-Saxon times, when Buckinghamshire was known for breeding swans for the king. The Bucks swan appears on the arms of some of the historic towns in Buckinghamshire, such as Aylesbury, Buckingham, Chesham, Marlow and High Wycombe.

=== Colours ===
The Pantone colours for the flag are:

Scheme	Red	White	Black	Yellow
Refs				
Pantone (paper)	186 C	Safe	Black	116
HEX	#C8102E	#FFFFFF	#000000	#FFCD00
CMYK	0, 100, 80, 5	0, 0, 0, 0	0, 0, 0, 100	0, 10, 98, 0
RGB	200, 16, 46	255, 255, 255	0, 0, 0	255, 205, 0

== History ==
The swan has long been associated as a symbol of Buckinghamshire. In addition to swans being endemic to the river Thames, the symbol likely dates back to pre-Norman Britain, when swans were bred for royalty in what is today Buckinghamshire. The symbol was used on various family coats of arms after the Norman Invasion. Some theorise that Sweyn, a 12th century Sheriff of Buckingham, used a badge with a swan on it as a pun on his name. In the 13th century Alianora de Bohun and her sister Mary, made the swan a symbol of the Bohun family, now known as the Bohun swan.

Alianora's great-grandson, Humphrey Stafford, 1st Duke of Buckingham continued to use the swan symbol, likely contributing to its association with the county. Despite the execution of Edward Stafford, 3rd Duke of Buckingham and the temporary abolition of the title, a swan on some form of bicolour gules remained a common symbol of Buckinghamshire.

The Buckinghamshire council were officially awarded this set of arms in 1948, with two swans - one as a charge on the shield and one as a supporter. Heraldry writer Wilfrid Scott-Giles remarked in his 1953 book Civic Heraldry Of England & Wales that Buckingham and High Wycombe both had arms that bore a swan device. In addition, the swan is found on the coats of arms of other towns in Buckinghamshire such as Aylesbury, Chesham and Marlow.

=== Modern flag ===
The flag in its current design had been used relatively interchangeably as a flag to represent Buckinghamshire with the slightly different banner of the coat of arms of Buckinghamshire County Council, which had a yellow bar above the design and a green Whiteleaf Cross above it. The design that is now officially registered, prior to its registration, was flown as the flag of Buckinghamshire outside the headquarters of Ministry of Housing, Communities and Local Government along with the Union Jack and other county flags.
