= Flag of Roraima =

Flag of the Brazilian state of Roraima

- Use: Civil and state flag
- Proportion: 2:3 or 7:10
- Adopted: 14 June 1996

The flag of Roraima is one of the official symbols of the state of Roraima in Brazil.

== History ==
The flag was designed by Mário Barreto, and instituted by state law No. 133 of June 14, 1996, which "Orders the adoption of Symbols of the State of Roraima, in accordance with Article 10 of the State Constitution and other measures".

== Description ==
Its format consists of a rectangle with a proportion (width-length) of 14 x 20 modules or equal parts, and its design is divided into three diagonal bands from left to right, and from bottom to top. The colors of the bands are, respectively: turquoise blue, white and flag green. Near the bottom of the flag is a narrow red band. In the center of the flag, resting on the red band, there is a gold star with dimensions that go beyond that of the central white band, referring to Wezen, from the constellation Canis Major.

== Symbolism ==
The main colors of the flag (green, yellow, blue and white) are a representation of the integration of the state with Brazil, separately each color has a specific meaning:

- Green represents dense forests and scrublands;
- Yellow (in the star) represents abundant mineral wealth;
- White, peace; and the blue, the sky and the pure air of Roraima;
- The thin red band symbolizes the equator;
- The yellow star represents Wezen, star of the constellation of Canis Maior, which in the national flag represents the state of Roraima.
