= Flag of Labrador =

Canadian regional flag (unofficial)

Labrador
- Proportion: 1:2
- Adopted: 1974
- Design: White, green (Pantone Green 356) and blue (Pantone Blue 306), horizontal tricolour with a stylized black spruce sprig on the canton.

The flag of Labrador is the unofficial flag for the continental region with adjacent islands of the Canadian province of Newfoundland and Labrador as distinct from the Newfoundland region of the province. It was created by a small group led by Michael S. Martin, who was then the representative for Labrador South in the provincial legislature. The flag has been influential in Labrador; its colours are mirrored in the flag of Nunatsiavut, and its black (bog) spruce twig was adopted for use on the Franco-Terreneuvien flag. The black spruce, a member of the pine family, is the most numerous tree in Labrador and in the Province of Newfoundland and Labrador. The black spruce is the official tree of the Province of Newfoundland and Labrador and thus serves as a reminder that Labrador is part of that larger entity.

== Impetus ==
In 1973, the government of Newfoundland asked the citizens of the province to adopt special projects to commemorate the event of the 25th anniversary of Newfoundland's 1949 confederation with Canada. The entire province of Newfoundland was without its own identity when it came to a flag, as the Union Jack, the flag of the United Kingdom, had been designated by the provincial cabinet as the flag of the province of Newfoundland in 1952. Michael S. Martin, the Member of the House of Assembly for the district of Labrador South, and several others decided that their project to celebrate would be the creation of a flag for Labrador to give at least that part of Newfoundland an outward symbol of identity. Martin et al. also created it as an act of political mischief aimed at Premier Joey Smallwood and his Liberal government's perceived indifference to Labrador.

== Design ==
The flag itself is 2:1 in its proportions and composed of three fesses. From the top they are white, green (Pantone Green 356) and blue (Pantone Blue 306), in a proportion of 1:2. In the left of the white field is a stylized representation of a sprig of the black spruce, the most common tree in Labrador and the province. It is the official tree of the whole province and thus serves as a reminder that Labrador is part of what is now the province of Newfoundland and Labrador. The twig has two year-growths, the first growth shorter than the second growth, and both have three branches (including the centre branch), each of approximately equal length.

== Symbolism ==
The top white bar represents the snow which colours the culture and lifestyle of Labradorians like no other element. The bottom blue bar represents the waters of Labrador which serve as the highway and sustainer of the people of Labrador. The centre green bar represents the nurturing land. It is thinner than the other two, as the northern climes of Labrador have short summers.

The twig is in two year-growths to represent the past and future of Labrador. The shorter growth of the inner twigs represents the hardships of the past, while the outer twigs are longer as a representation of the hope Labradorians have for the future. The three branches represent the three founding nations of Labrador; the Innu, the Inuit, and the European settlers. The three branches emerging from a single stalk represents the unity of the distinct peoples in the brotherhood of all mankind, thus representing people of these and all backgrounds in Labrador. Since the black spruce, a member of the pine family of trees is the official tree of the Province of Newfoundland and Labrador it also serves as a reminder that Labrador is part of that larger entity.

== Presentation ==
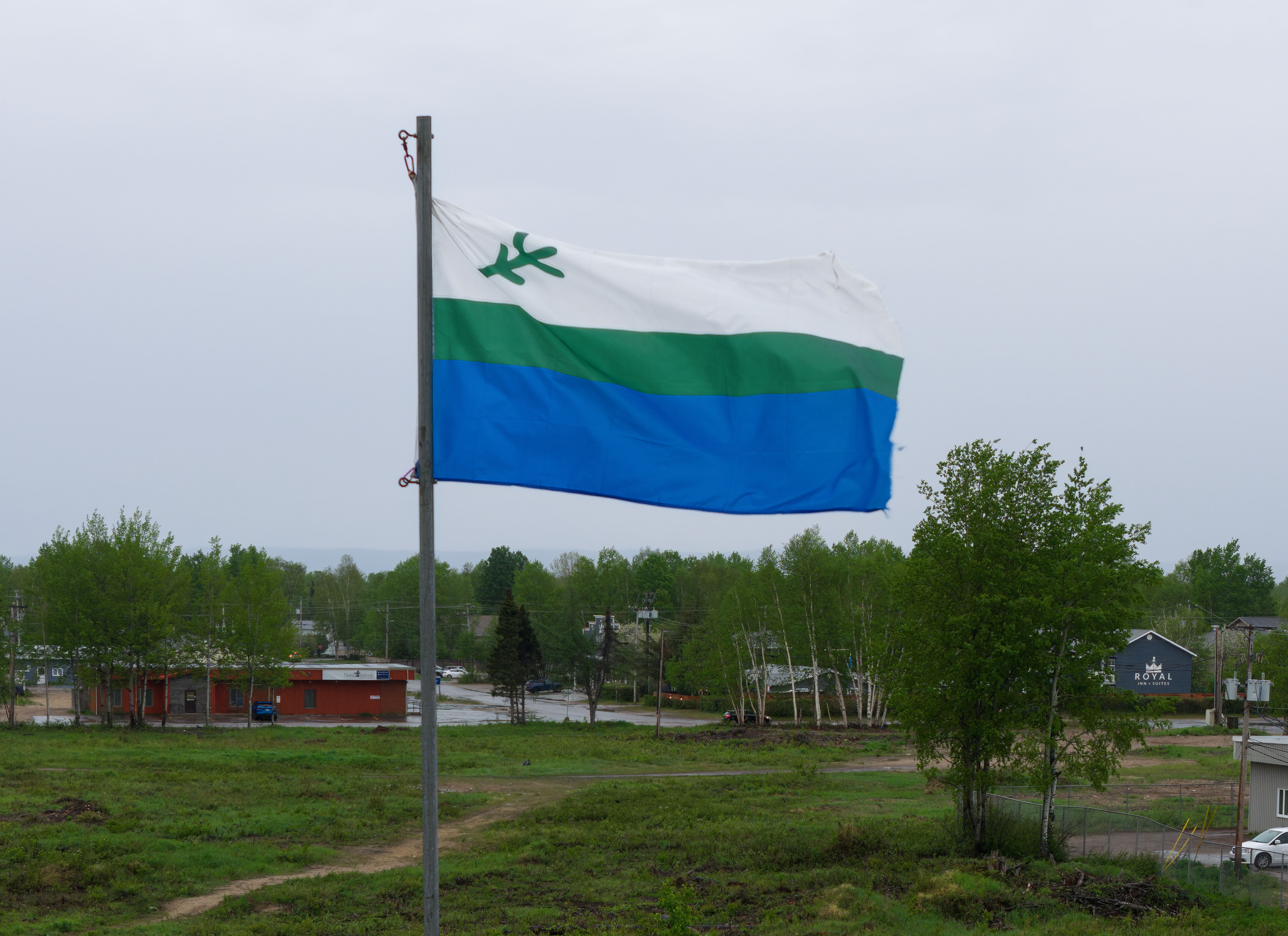
Labrador flag in Happy Valley-Goose Bay

Originally, 64 flags were manufactured, each sewn together by Martin's wife; one for each of the 59 towns and villages in Labrador, one for each of the other three Labrador members of the House of Assembly, and one each for Martin and his wife personally. The flags were sent out to the communities for display on March 31, 1974, the anniversary of Newfoundland joining confederation (the time was one second before midnight so as not to be on April 1). On April 1, the three flags intended for MHAs were presented to them in a public ceremony at the Confederation Building, which houses the Provincial Legislature, in St. John's.

== See also ==
- Flag of Newfoundland and Labrador
- Newfoundland Tricolour
- Flag of Nunatsiavut
