= Black Banner Organization =

Iraqi guerrilla organization

- تنظيم الراية السودة
- Leader: Omar Hadid al Falluji
- Ideology: Sunni islamism
- Wars: Iraqi Insurgency

The Black Banner Organization (Arabic: تنظيم الراية السودة, Tandhīm Al Rāyah Al Sawdāh) was an Iraqi guerrilla organization that battled multinational troops in Iraq. The organization's ideology was believed to be radical Sunni Islamism.

== Organization ==
Black Banners has been identified as the armed battalion of the Secret Islamic Army. The group's leader has been identified as Omar (variant: Umar) Hadid al-Falluji, an Iraqi who is believed to have international militant Islamist links. Some U.S. and Iraqi officials believe Hadid was close to Jordanian terrorist leader Abu Musab al-Zarqawi, whose al-Qaida-linked movement allegedly used Fallujah as a headquarters. A large share of its membership is believed to be composed of non-Iraqi fighters, especially from Syria.

This group was an active member of the Iraqi insurgency, sharing joint control of Falluja with other militant groups, where it imposed strict Sharia law, and was responsible for a number of kidnappings. This included the abduction of three Indians, two Kenyans, and an Egyptian working for a Kuwaiti company operating in Iraq in 2004. The aim was to compel the company to stop its activities in Iraq. The hostages were later released. The black banner organization eventually became integrated with Al-Qaeda in Iraq.

== Attacks against ==
Coalition military officials believe that a campaign of airstrikes against insurgent safehouses and positions in Fallujah seriously disrupted the network of the Black Banner Organization. Omar Hadid is said to have narrowly avoided capture by U.S. forces twice.

== Sources ==
- bbc.co.uk
- http://www.upi.com/view.cfm?StoryID=20040722-084908-1295r
- http://www.iwpr.net/index.pl?archive/irq/irq_83_1_eng.txt
- https://www.nytimes.com/2004/10/27/international/middleeast/27marines.html?pagewanted=2&ei=5094&en=c904464482078c63&hp&ex=1098936000&partner=homepage
- "Fallujah's real boss: Omar the electrician". The Seattle Times. Archived from the original on 21 February 2009.
