= List of Barbadian flags =

This is a list of flags used in Barbados.

== National flag ==
Flag	Date	Use	Description
	1966–present	Flag of Barbados	Tricolour of two bands of ultramarine separated by a golden middle band. The ultramarine represents the sky and the ocean, the gold represents the sand. A black trident head is centred within the golden band.
	1966–present	Flag of Barbados (vertical)	

== Governmental flags ==
Flag	Date	Use	Description
	2021–present	Standard of the president of Barbados	A flag with dark blue field bearing the coat of arms of Barbados and a golden trident surrounding by wreath of laurels in the center.
	1966–present	Standard of the prime minister of Barbados	A flag diagonally divided in yellow and blue by black-white rope, and bearing the coat of arms of Barbados on a white disc surrounding by knocked rope.

== Military flags ==
Flag	Date	Use	Description
Link to file		Barbados Defence Force (BDF)	A green flag with the BDF emblem in the center.
		Naval ensign of Barbados	A white ensign with the flag of Barbados in the canton.

== Historical flags ==
Flag	Date	Use	Description
	1870–1966	Flag of the Colony of Barbados	A British Blue Ensign with an emblem of Barbados.
	1958–1962	Flag of the West Indies Federation	
	1870–1966	Flag of the governor of Barbados	A Union Jack with an emblem of Barbados in the centre surrounded by a laurel wreath.
	1870–1966	Ensign of Barbados	A British Red Ensign with an emblem of Barbados.
	2016	Barbados 50th Anniversary of Independence banner	
	1975–2021	Personal Standard of Queen Elizabeth II in Barbados	A bearded fig tree in the centre and a pride of Barbados flower in each of the top corners on a yellow field. A blue disc of the letter "E" crowned surrounded by a garland of gold roses defaces the flag.
	1966–2021	Standard of the governor-general of Barbados	A lion standing on a crown, on a blue field, with the word "Barbados".

== See also ==
- Flag of the British Windward Islands
- Flag of the West Indies Federation
- National symbols of Barbados
