= Flag of Maranhão =

Flag of the Brazilian state of Maranhão

- Use: National flag
- Proportion: 2:3
- Adopted: December 6, 1889
- Design: Nine stripes in a horizontal direction, interspersed, four white, three red and two black, with a blue canton occupying a third of the length of the flag and half of its width, in the top left with a white star in the center.
- Designed by: Joaquim de Sousa Andrade

The flag of Maranhão was created by Joaquim de Sousa Andrade. The flag consists of nine stripes in a horizontal direction, interspersed, four white, three red and two black, with a blue canton occupying a third of the length of the flag and half of its width, in the top left with a white star in the center. The three colors of the stripes represent the ethnic composition of the population of Maranhão (Indigenous, black, and white Brazilians), while the star represents Beta Scorpii, which in turn represents the state of Maranhão on the Flag of Brazil.

== History ==
Unofficial flag of the Province of Maranhão, in use until 1889.
