= Flag of Paraná (state) =

Flag of the Brazilian state of Paraná

- Use: Civil and state flag
- Proportion: 7:10
- Adopted: 9 January 1892; 134 years ago

The flag of Paraná, Brazil, was adopted on 9 January 1892. It went through changes in March 1947, and again in September, 1990.

The current flag took its form on 31 March 1947. It is composed of a green quadrilateral, crossed from the upper left angle to the lower right by a large white stripe, which symbolizes the Tropic of Capricorn (which passes through northern Paraná), bearing a blue circle with the five stars of the Southern Cross (Crux) in lower course. The Cross is depicted with south at the top, as it appears in the night sky.

The circle is crossed, below the "Star of Magellan" (Estrela de Magalhães), by a thin stripe that suggests a horizon, featuring the word "PARANÁ" in green, lightened by the only visible star of that constellation. The sphere is surrounded by a branch of Paraná Pine tree — one of the most widespread symbols of the state — on the right, and by a branch of Yerba mate on the left.

== Gallery ==
1892-1905

1905-1923

1990-2002

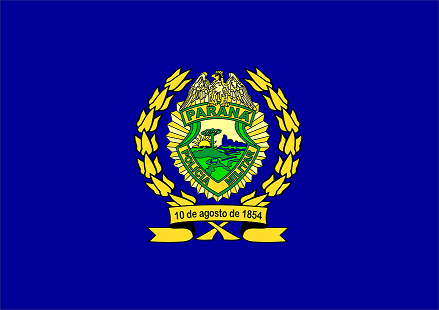
Flag of Military Police of Paraná State

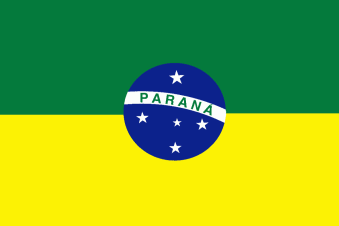
Flag of the Governorate of Paraná, mainly used on military bases
