= Flag of Arkhangelsk Oblast =

Arkhangelsk Oblast
- Proportion: 2:3
- Adopted: 23 September 2009
- Design: A light blue saltire on a field of white with the coat of arms of the Arkhangelsk Oblast in the center

The flag of Arkhangelsk Oblast, a federal subject of Russia, was adopted 23 September 2009. It consists of a light blue saltire on a field of white, charged with the coat of arms of Arkhangelsk Oblast. The arms of the city display the Archangel Michael in the act of defeating the Devil. Legend states that this victory took place near where the city stands, hence its name, and that Michael still stands watch over the city to prevent the Devil's return. Its ratio is 2:3.

== Other flags ==
=== Administrative divisions ===
Flag	Date	Use	Description
	?–present	Flag of Mirny	
	?–present	Flag of Koryazhma	
	?–present	Flag of Kotlas	
	?–present	Flag of Novodvinsk	
	?–present	Flag of Severodvinsk	
	?–present	Flag of Kholmogorsky District	
	?–present	Flag of Konoshsky District	
	?–present	Flag of Kotlassky District	
	?–present	Flag of Krasnoborsky District	
	?–present	Flag of Lensky District	
	?–present	Flag of Leshukonsky District	
	?–present	Flag of Mezensky District	
	?–present	Flag of Novaya Zemlya	
	?–present	Flag of Nyandomsky District	
	?–present	Flag of Onezhsky District	
	?–present	Flag of Pinezhsky District	
	?–present	Flag of Plesetsky District	
	?–present	Flag of Primorsky District	
	?–present	Flag of Shenkursky District	
	?–present	Flag of Ustyansky District	
	?–present	Flag of Velsky District	
	?–present	Flag of Verkhnetoyemsky District	
	?–present	Flag of Vilegodsky District	
	?–present	Flag of Vinogradovsky District	
