= List of Turkish flags =

This is a list of flags used historically and currently by the state of Turkey and its predecessor states. For a list of flags related to the Ottoman Empire, see Flags of the Ottoman Empire.

== National flags ==
| Flag | Date | Use | Description |
|---|---|---|---|
| | 1936–present | Flag of Turkey | 18th-century design officially adopted in 1844. The star and crescent design appears on Ottoman flags beginning in the late 18th or early 19th century. The white star and crescent moon on red as the flag of the Ottoman Empire was introduced 1844. After the declaration of the Republic of Turkey in 1923, the new administrative regime maintained the last flag of the Ottoman Empire. Proportional standardizations were introduced in the Turkish Flag Law of 1936. |
| | 1923–present | Presidential standard of the president of Turkey. | The flag of Turkey with a presidential seal in the upper hoist, which is composed of a sun with eight long and eight short rays surrounded by sixteen stars. The sun represents the infinity of Turkey, and the sixteen stars represent the 16 Great Turkic Empires in history. The sixteen stars are aligned with a 22.5 degree angle, equidistantly surrounding the sun. One point of each star points to the center of the sun. |
| | ?–present | Flag of the Grand National Assembly of Turkey | A white field with a seal in the center. |

== Military flags ==
| Flag | Date | Use | Description |
|---|---|---|---|
| | ?–present | Standard of the Chief of the Turkish General Staff. | |

=== Land Forces ===
| Flag | Date | Use | Description |
|---|---|---|---|
| | 2024–present | Flag of the commander of the Turkish Land Forces. | |
| | ?–present | Flag of the Turkish Land Forces Army Command. | |
| | ?–present | Corps command flag, Logistics command flag, Training and Doctrine command flag | |
| | ?–present | Division command flag, Military academy command flag, Training and Doctrine School command flag, and Training Center command flag | |
| | ?–present | Class School and Training Center command flag | |
| | ?–present | Regimental command flag, Brigade Deputy Commander flag, and Garrison Commander flag | |
| | ?–present | Land Forces Command Air Support Continental Group command flag | |
| | ?–present | Battalion command flag | |
| | ?–present | Brigade Support Troops command flag | |
| | ?–present | Army Aviation School command flag | |
| | ?–present | Army Aviation command flag | |
| | ?–present | Army Aviation Regiment command flag | |

=== Naval Forces ===
| Flag | Date | Use | Description |
|---|---|---|---|
| | ?–present | Flag of the grand admiral. | |
| | 1904–1937 | Flag of the commander of the Turkish Naval Forces. | |
| | ?–present | Flag of the admiral. | |
| | ?–present | Flag of the vice admiral. | |
| | ?–present | Flag of the rear admiral. | |
| | ?–present | Flag of the rear admiral (LH). | |
| | ?–present | Flag of the commodore. | |
| | ?–present | Flag of the captain. | |

=== Air Force ===
| Flag | Date | Use | Description |
|---|---|---|---|
| | ?–present | Flag of the commander of the Turkish Air Force. | |
| | ?–present | Flag of the Combat Air Force and Air Missile Defense Command. | |
| | ?–present | Flag of the lieutenant-general. | |
| | ?–present | Flag of the major general. | |
| | ?–present | Flag of the brigadier-general. | |
| | ?–present | Flag of the Regiment Command. | |
| | ?–present | Flag of the Battalion-Fleet Command. | |

=== Gendarmerie General Command ===
| Flag | Date | Use | Description |
|---|---|---|---|
| | ?–present | Flag of the Gendarmerie General Command | |

=== Coast Guard Command ===
| Flag | Date | Use | Description |
|---|---|---|---|
| | 2024–present | Flag of the Coast Guard Command | |

== Other ==
| Flag | Date | Use | Description |
|---|---|---|---|
| | ?–present | Flag of the General Directorate of Customs Protection | |
| | ?–present | Flag of the Customs Administration of Turkey | |
| | ?–present | Flag of the General Directorate of Health for Borders and Coasts | |
