= Flag of Astrakhan Oblast =

Flag of Astrakhan Oblast

The flag of Astrakhan Oblast, a federal subject of Russia, was adopted 19 December 2001. The flag is a crown (representing its status as an oblast) and scimitar (representing its influence from India) charge on a teal blue field. The ratio of the flag is 2:3.

== Other flags ==
Flag	Date	Use	Description
	1997–present	Flag of Astrakhan city	
	?–present	Flag of Znamensk	
	?–present	Flag of Akhtubinsky District	
	?–present	Flag of Chernoyarsky District	
	?–present	Flag of Kharabalinsky District	
	?–present	Flag of Krasnoyarsky District	
	?–present	Flag of Limansky District	
	?–present	Flag of Narimanovsky District	
	?–present	Flag of Volodarsky District	
	?–present	Flag of Yenotayevsky District	
