= Flag of Karachay-Cherkessia =

Flag of the Russian republic of Karachay-Cherkessia

Karachay-Cherkess Republic
- Proportion: 1:2
- Adopted: 26 July 1996
- Design: A horizontal tricolour of light blue, green and red, with a circle containing a rising sun from behind a mountain, centered on the green band

The flag of the Karachay-Cherkess Republic (Note: Russian: Государственный Флаг Карачаево-Черкесской Республики, Kabardian: Къэрэшей-Шэрджэс Республикэм и Къэрал Нып, Karachay-Balkar: Къарачай Черкес Республиканы Къырал Байрагъы, Abaza: Къарча-Черкес Республика Къральыгӏва Баракъ), a federal subject and republic in the Russian Federation, was adopted on 26 July 1996.

== Description ==
The flag consists of three equally sized bars, from top to bottom in the colours light blue, green, and red. Light blue symbolizes peace, kind motives and quiet. Green represents nature, fertility and wealth. Red is for the warmth and unity of the people of Karachay–Cherkessia. In the center of the green bar is a white circle containing the sun rising from behind a mountain, representing the landscape of the republic. A similar symbol is found in the Flag of Kabardino-Balkaria.

By the Decree of the Supreme Council of the Karachay-Cherkess Republic of December 3, 1994 No. 76-XXI, the flag of Karachay-Cherkessia was adopted:

The national flag of the Karachay-Cherkess Republic is a right quadrilateral in the aspect ratio: length to height 2:1.

The state flag of the Karachay-Cherkess Republic is formed from three colors: light blue, green, and red. The colors are arranged in three horizontal stripes of equal width: light blue on top, green in the middle, and red on the bottom.

In the middle of the green strip, in its entire width, there is a bright circle (ring), in which the sun rises from behind the mountains with five wide double and six thin and short rays.

On July 26, 1996, changes were made to the description of the flag that do not affect its image:

The state flag of the Karachay-Cherkess Republic is a panel of three equal horizontal stripes: the top one is light blue, the middle one is green and the bottom one is red. In the center of the cloth is a light circle (ring), in which the sun rises from behind the mountains with five wide double and six thin and short rays.

The ratio of the flag's width to its length is 1:2.

== Symbolism ==
The colors on the State Flag of the Karachay-Cherkess Republic mean:

- Light blue color - the personification of the world, bright and good motives and tranquility;
- Green is the main color of nature, a symbol of fertility, wealth and creation, the color of youth and at the same time wisdom and restraint;
- Red is a solemn color, a symbol of warmth and closeness between peoples.

According to an unofficial interpretation, the colors of the flag reflect the main ethnic groups in the population of the Karachay-Cherkess Republic:

- Light blue - represents the Turkic peoples of the Karachay-Cherkess Republic - Karachays and Nogais;
- Green - symbolizes the Adyghe peoples - Circassians and Abazins;
- Red - Slavic population of the Karachay-Cherkess Republic.

== Color scheme ==
| Colors scheme | Blue | Green | Red | Yellow | White |
|---|---|---|---|---|---|
| CMYK | 100-31-0-18 | 100-0-61-56 | 0-88-97-12 | 0-30-100-0 | 0-0-0-0 |
| HEX | #0091D1 | #00712C | #E11A07 | #FFB200 | #FFFFFF |
| RGB | 0-145-209 | 0-113-44 | 225-26-7 | 255-178-0 | 255-255-255 |

== Gallery ==
Alternative flag of Karachay-Cherkessia with a blue field behind the sun.

Alternative flag of Karachay-Cherkessia with a simplified central emblem.
