= Flag of Pernambuco =

Pernambuco
- Use: Civil and state flag
- Proportion: 2:3
- Adopted: 23 February 1917

The flag of Pernambuco is one of the official symbols of the Brazilian state of Pernambuco. It is a bicolor pennant, blue and white, with the colors broken horizontally into two unequal sections, with blue in the upper and larger rectangle, the rainbow composed of three colors, red, yellow and green, with a star in above and below the sun, inside the semicircle, both in yellow, and, in the lower and smaller white rectangle, a red cross.

== History ==
The flag originated in the Pernambuco Revolution of 1817, being made official in the commemoration of its centenary, in 1917, by Decree nº 459/1917, sanctioned by the governor Manuel Antônio Pereira Borba.

The pennant of Pernambuco emerged before Brazilian independence, and was conceived to be the flag of Brazil under a liberal republican regime. In the pavilion of the ephemeral Pernambuco republic of 1817, the color blue symbolized the sky; the white color represented the nation that was founded on a desire for peace; the rainbow, initially red, yellow and white (in 1917 it became red, yellow and green) marked the beginning of a new era, of peace, friendship and unity, which the confederation offered to the European Portuguese and people of all nations that came peaceably to its ports or perchance resided here; the three stars represented Pernambuco, Paraíba and Rio Grande do Norte — and other stars would be inserted around the rainbow while other Brazilian captaincies officially joined the confederation, which demonstrated the federalist character of the movement —; the cross was a reference to the denomination of Brazil in its beginnings (Terra de Santa Cruz or Ilha da Vera Cruz); and the Sun illuminated the future, means that the inhabitants of Pernambuco are children of the sun and live under it, under the same justice that makes everyone equal. The creator of the flag was the priest and revolutionary João Ribeiro Pessoa de Melo Montenegro and it was executed on canvas by the painter Antônio Alvares.

In the current flag, adopted in 1917, the blue color of the upper rectangle symbolizes the grandeur of the Pernambuco sky; the white color represents peace; the rainbow symbolizes the union of all Pernambuco; the star characterizes the state in the Federation as a whole, which on the national flag is represented by Denebakrab; the sun is the strength and energy of Pernambuco; and finally, the cross represents faith in justice and understanding. The only modification to the original flag was the removal of two of the three stars above the rainbow.

During the 2022 FIFA World Cup celebrated in Qatar, Qatari authorities removed the flag of Pernambuco after mistaking its rainbow like colors' for an expression of support for LGBTQ people rights.

== Historical and proposed flags ==
Dutch West India Company, 1634-1637

Flag of Dutch Brazil — John Maurice of Nassau, 1637-1643

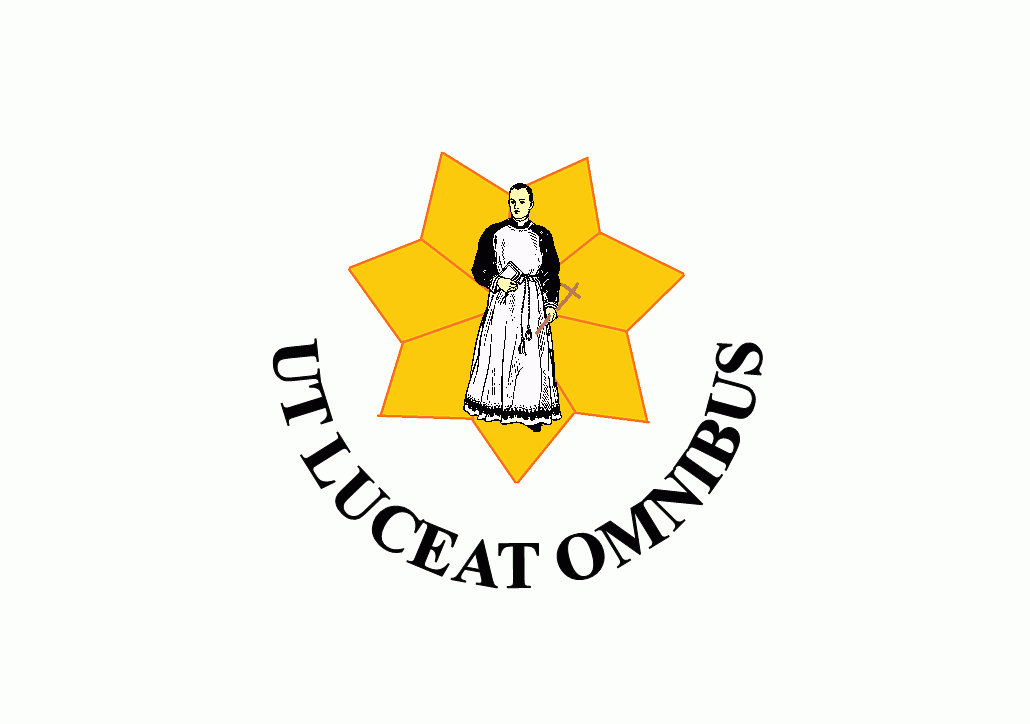
General Company of Commerce of Pernambuco and Paraíba, 1756

Flag of the Pernambuco Revolt, 1817

Flag of the Confederation of the Equator, 1824

Mercantile flag of the Province of Pernambuco, during the Empire of Brazil

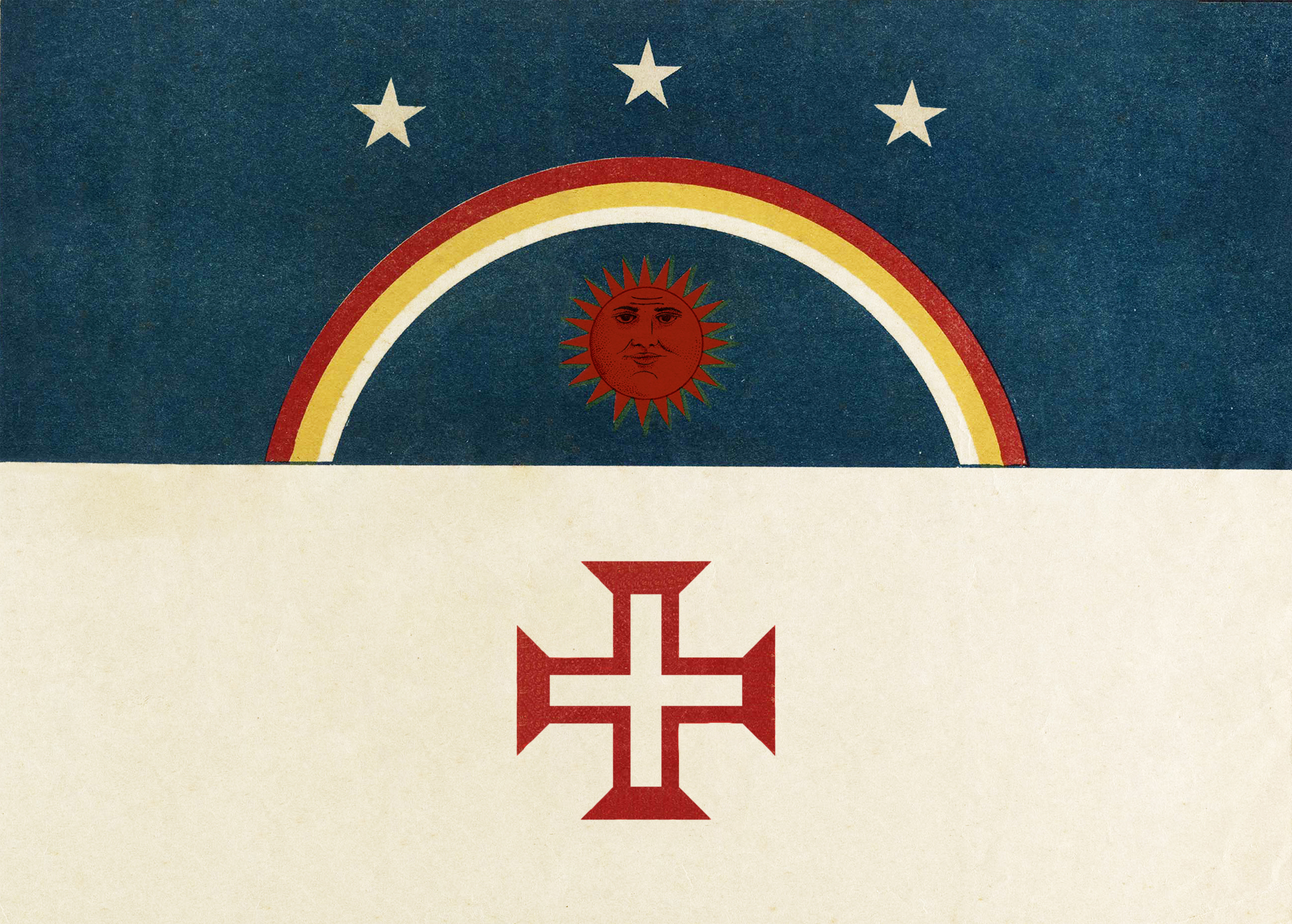
State proposal, authored by historian Francisco Augusto Pereira da Costa, which became Bill 45 of 1911, but which was never instituted
