= Flag of the president of Belarus =

Official symbol of the president of Belarus

President of Belarus
- Proportion: 1:1.2
- Adopted: 2012
- Design: Flag of Belarus with the state emblem and revised aspect ratio.
- Former design
- Adopted: 1997
- Relinquished: 2012

The flag (standard) of the president of Belarus (Belarusian: Штандар Прэзідэнта Рэспублікі Беларусь) is the official symbol of the president of Belarus. It is used at buildings and on vehicles to denote the presence of the president.

The presidential standard, which has been in use since 1997, was adopted by a decree called "Concerning the Standard of the President of Republic of Belarus".

== Design ==
The standard's design is an exact copy of the national flag, with the addition of the Belarusian national emblem in gold and red. The standard's ratio of 5:6 differs from that of the national flag, making the standard almost square. The presidential flag is framed with golden fringes.

== Usage ==
The original version of the presidential standard is kept in the office of the president at the Independence Palace. The duplicates of presidential flag can be placed in the halls or rooms of the Independence Palace or presidential residences if any official event is intended to be conducted in the presence of the president; on other premises when the president of Belarus is visiting; in the hall of the building, where official or other types of events are being held with the participation of the president of Belarus; and on the vehicles of the president.

The presidential flag is also used during inauguration ceremony.

== See also ==
- President of Belarus
- Flag of Belarus
