= Flag of Lancashire =

Flag of English county

- Proportion: 3:5
- Adopted: 20 November 2008
- Design: A red rose flower on a yellow (gold) field.
- Designed by: Friends of Real Lancashire

The Lancashire flag is used to represent the historic county of Lancashire, England. It consists of a red rose on a gold field; the red rose is a traditional symbol of Lancashire, and red and yellow are also the livery colours of the county.

The flag was designed by the Friends of Real Lancashire, a pressure group which promotes the historic county, and registered in 2008 with the Flag Institute, a British charity which promotes vexillology.

The flag has been flown from public buildings within the historic county on Lancashire Day (27 November), including County Hall in Preston and St Helens Town Hall, and from the Ministry for Housing, Communities, and Local Government building in London. It has also been raised on public flagpoles in Littleborough and Milnrow, in the borough of Rochdale.

== Design ==
The design is the Red Rose of Lancaster on a yellow field.

=== Colours ===
The colours of the flag are:

Scheme	Yellow	Red	Dark red	Green
Pantone (paper)	116 C	485 C	201 C	354 C
HEX	#ffcd00	#da291c	#9d2235	#00b140
CMYK	0, 20, 100, 0	0, 81, 87, 15	0, 78, 66, 38	100, 0, 64, 31
RGB	255, 205, 0	218, 41, 28	158, 35, 54	0, 177, 64

== History ==
The Red Rose of Lancaster derives from the gold rose badge of Edward I of England. Other members of his family used variants of the royal badge, with the king's brother, Edmund Crouchback, the Earl of Lancaster, using a red rose. It is incorrectly believed that the Red Rose of Lancaster was the House of Lancaster's badge during the Wars of the Roses. Evidence for this "wearing of the rose" includes scant evidence. There are, however, doubts as to whether the red rose was actually an emblem taken up by the Lancastrians during the Wars of the Roses. Adrian Ailes has noted that the red rose "probably owes its popular usage to Henry VII quickly responding to the pre-existing Yorkist white rose in an age when signs and symbols could speak louder than words."

It also allowed Henry to invent and exploit his most famous heraldic device, the Tudor Rose, combining the so-called Lancastrian red rose and the White Rose of York. This floral union neatly symbolised the restoration of peace and harmony and his marriage in January 1486 to Elizabeth of York. It was a brilliant piece of simple heraldic propaganda". The Tudor Rose is used as the plant badge of England (Scotland uses the thistle, Ireland uses the shamrock, and Wales uses the leek).

The rose continued to be a symbol of Lancashire-based organisations into the 19th century, though most cities in the county hadn't been awarded arms with the rose, like they do today.

=== Previous designs ===
An unofficial Lancashire flag, a red rose on a white field, was never registered. When an attempt was made to register it with the Flag Institute, it was found that this flag had already been registered by the town of Montrose, Angus, several hundred years earlier with the Lyon Office. As the Flag Institute will not register two flags of the same design within the United Kingdom, the current design was registered instead.

Version of the Lancashire flag with a white background, commonly used before the adoption of the current version.

Flag of Montrose.
