= Coat of arms of Tonga =

Coat of arms of Tonga Sila ʻo Tonga
- Armiger: Tupou VI, King of Tonga
- Adopted: 4 November 1875
- Crest: the Royal Crown of Tonga within an olive wreath.
- Shield: Quarterly; first, Or, three mullets of six points argent; second, Gules, the Royal Crown of Tonga proper; third, Azure a dove volant argent holding an olive branch vert; fourth Or, three swords in fret argent; overall, a mullet of six points argent charged with a cross couped gules.
- Supporters: Flags of Tonga
- Motto: Ko e ʻOtua mo Tonga ko hoku Tofiʻa "God and Tonga are my inheritance"

The coat of arms or national seal of Tonga (ko e Sila ʻo Tonga) was designed in 1875 with the creation of the constitution.

== Description ==
The routinely used version of the coat of arms is split into quarters. The three stars of Tonga are represented by three stars in the upper left quadrant. The monarchy of the country is shown by a crown in the upper right. The general idea of peace is shown by a white dove and olive branch in the bottom left. Lastly, the bottom right has three swords that showcase the three chiefly lines that have ruled the nation. In addition to this are a crest of the Crown of Tonga with a laurel wreath, and two flags. A banderole on the bottom has nation's motto Ko e 'otua mo Tonga ko hoku tofi'a (God and Tonga are my inheritance).

== Royal Standard ==
The Royal Standard of Tonga is the monarch's personal flag and is an armorial banner of the Royal Arms of Tonga.

The Royal Standard of Tonga

== See also ==
- Flag of Tonga
