= Flag of the City of Madrid =

City of Madrid
- Proportion: 2:3 or 3:5
- Adopted: 28 April 1967; 59 years ago

The flag of the City of Madrid represents the city's coat of arms centred on a crimson field. The flag is made either in the proportions 3:5 or 2:3, and in shades of crimson corresponding to Pantone 207 or 208.

The significance of the bear leaning against a madroño, or strawberry tree, is unknown; however, the madroño tree is native to Madrid. One known theory is that bear and tree represent a farming rights dispute between the clergy and citizens. The seven stars supposedly represent the seven stars in the Starry Plough constellation closest to the Ursa Major (Great Bear) Constellation. The stars symbolise the north, and since that is the direction on which all others are based, the stars represent Madrid as the seat of government for Spain.
