= List of flags containing the color purple =

Purple is one of the least used colors in vexillology and heraldry. Currently, the color appears in only three national flags: that of Dominica, El Salvador, and Nicaragua, and one co-official national flag, the Wiphala (co-official national flag of Bolivia). However, it is also present in the flags of several administrative subdivisions around the world, as well as flags of political and ethnic groups and sexual minorities.

== Background ==
In the past, purple dye was very expensive to produce, with the first compound used as one, Tyrian purple, being made from the mucus of a family of sea snail found only in the eastern Mediterranean and off Mogador Island near Morocco. To produce small amounts of it, it was required to obtain the mucus of thousands of snails, which was extremely labor-intensive. As such, it remained extremely expensive to use the dye, which resulted in it having almost no presence in flags and gaining the reputation as the color of nobility and royalty, as they were the only groups able to readily afford it. In Asia, the main dye used was Han purple, although it more closely resembles indigo.

During the Medieval Ages, in Europe, the color was used in the standard of the Kingdom of León, during the reign of Alfonso VII, and in the royal standard of the Kingdom of Castile. Both states united in 1230, forming the Crown of Castile, which continued to use the combination of their flags until 1715. In South America, during the Pre-Columbian era, the Wiphala, a flag used by the subdivisions of the Inca Empire, contained the color purple.

In the modern era, synthetic purple dyes became easier to obtain, and flags with the color purple began being used more commonly. In 1931, the Second Spanish Republic established a tricolor flag consisting of red, yellow and purple stripes as its national flag, seeing use in Spain until 1939 and by the Spanish Republican government in exile until 1977. The flag is still sometimes used by supporters of republicanism in Spain.

Currently, the color appears in only four national flags: those of Dominica, El Salvador, Nicaragua, and Spain, as well as one co-official national flag, the Wiphala (co-official national flag of Bolivia). However, it is present in the flags of several administrative subdivisions around the world.

== National flags ==
=== Current ===
Image	Country	Date of adoption	Notes
	Bolivia	7 February 2009	Used as the co-official national flag; see Wiphala
	Dominica	3 November 1978	As purple sisserou parrot, a national symbol (see flag of Dominica)
	El Salvador	27 May 1912	As part of the rainbow in the coat of arms (see flag of El Salvador)
	Nicaragua	27 August 1971	As part of the rainbow in the coat of arms (see flag of Nicaragua)
	Spain	5 October 1981	As purpure lion in the coat of arms (see flag of Spain)

=== Historical ===
Image	Country	Years of usage	Notes
	Sasanian Empire	c. 3rd–7th century	See Derafsh Kaviani
	Kingdom of León	11th century	Used during the reign of Alfonso VII (1105-1157) (see heraldry of León)
	Dungapur State	1177–1527	
	Dungapur State	1713–1818	
	Crown of Castile	14th century	see heraldry of Castile
	Crown of Castile	15th century	see heraldry of Castile
	Crown of Castile	ca.1500–1715	see heraldry of Castile
	Saint-Domingue	1791–1794	Flag of Saint-Domingue under the rebel control during the Haitian Revolution
	United Provinces of Central America	1823–1824	As part of the rainbow in the coat of arms
	Federal Republic of Central America	1824–1838	As part of the rainbow in the coat of arms
	Nicaragua	1896–1908	As part of the rainbow in the coat of arms (see flag of Nicaragua)
	Nicaragua	1908–1971	As part of the rainbow in the coat of arms (see flag of Nicaragua)
	Second Spanish Republic	1931–1939	see flag of the Second Spanish Republic
	Second Spanish Republic	1931–1939	civil ensign; see flag of the Second Spanish Republic
	Dominica	1978–1981	As purple sisserou parrot, a national symbol (see flag of Dominica)
	Dominica	1978–1981	As purple sisserou parrot, a national symbol (see flag of Dominica)
	Dominica	1988–1990	As purple sisserou parrot, a national symbol (see flag of Dominica)

== Subdivisional flags ==
=== Current ===
Image	Administrative division	Country	Date of adoption	Notes
	Aberdeenshire	United Kingdom	22 April 2023	see flag of Aberdeenshire
	Adjuntas	Puerto Rico, United States		see flag of Adjuntas
	Ambrolauri Municipality	Georgia	26 November 2010	
	Amoroto	Spain	12 July 1988	
	Amnat Charoen	Thailand		
	Balearic Islands	Spain	1983	see flag of the Balearic Islands
	Barão	Brazil	Rio Grande do Sul	
	Bomi County	Liberia	1965	
	Bueng Kan	Thailand	23 March 2011	
	Buriram	Thailand	1942	
	Burón	Spain	Castile and León	
	Canóvanas	Puerto Rico, United States		
	Choctaw Nation of Oklahoma	United States		
	Castile and León	Spain	1983	see flag of Castile and León
	Ciales	Puerto Rico, United States	1970	
	Department of Cuzco	Peru	4 June 2021	see flag of Cusco
	Castile and León	Spain		flag variant; see flag of Castile and León
	Connecticut	United States	1897	see Flag of Connecticut
	Gu Achi	Tohono Oʼodham Nation		see Tohono Oʼodham § Districts
	Gunma Prefecture	Japan	25 October 1968	
	Higuera de Calatrava	Andalusia	2002	
	Jewish Autonomous Oblast	Russia	27 October 1996	As part of the rainbow (see flag of the Jewish Autonomous Oblast)
	Kyoto Prefecture	Japan	2 November 1976	
	Mamoré Province	Bolivia		
	Mesas de Ibor	Spain	Extremadura	1996
	Ninotsminda Municipality	Georgia	20 April 2010	
	North Chungcheong Province	South Korea	2023	
	Okayama Prefecture	Japan	1967	
	Peñuelas	Puerto Rico, United States		
	Quindío Department	Colombia		
	Sagarejo Municipality	Georgia	27 May 2011	
	San Germán	Puerto Rico, United States		
	San Pedro de Ceque	Castile and León	2005	
	Toužetín	Czechia		
	Val Mara	Switzerland		
	Virginia	United States	28 March 1912	see Flag of Virginia
	Yabucoa	Puerto Rico, United States		
	Yamanashi Prefecture	Japan	1 December 1966	

=== Historical ===
Image	Administrative division	Country	Years of usage	Notes
	Antisuyu	Inca Empire	15th–16th century	
	Chinchay Suyu	Inca Empire	15th–16th century	
	Qullasuyu	Inca Empire	15th–16th century	
	Baudh State	British India		
	Department of Cuzco	Peru	1978–2021	see flag of Cusco
	Governorate of Estonia	Russian Empire	1721–1917	
	Dungapur State	Mughal Empire	1527–1713	
	Dungapur State	East India Company	1818–1857	
	Dungapur State	British Raj	1857–1947	
	Jaisalmer State	East India Company		
	Jewish Autonomous Oblast	Russia	1996	As part of the rainbow (see flag of the Jewish Autonomous Oblast)
	Kutlehar State	East India Company	750s–1810	
	Kutlehar State	British Raj	1810–1957	
	Rajpipla State	East India Company	1340–1948	
	Ropaži Municipality	Latvia	2000–2009	
	Ropaži Municipality	Latvia	2012–2021	
	Borova Raion	Ukraine	Until 2020	
	Ichnia Raion	Ukraine	Until 2020	
	Mashivka Raion	Ukraine	Until 2020	
	North Chungcheong Province	South Korea	1969-1998	

=== Other flags ===
Image	Flag	Country	Date of adoption	Notes
	Flag of Mallorca	Spain		Flag of the island of Mallorca
	Flag of Pourlet	France		Flag of Pourlet, one of traditional regions of Brittany
	Wiphala	Argentina, Bolivia, Chile, Colombia, Ecuador, Peru		Flag used as the symbol of various native peoples around the area of Andes in South America. Historically associated with the Inca Empire

== City flags ==
=== Current ===
Image	City	Country	Administrative division	Date of adoption	Notes
	Ambrolauri	Georgia	Racha-Lechkhumi and Kvemo Svaneti	September 2015	
	Amoroto	Spain	Basque Country	12 July 1988	
	Avratyn	Ukraine	Khmelnytskyi Oblast		
	Bobures	Venezuela	Zulia	2024	
	Córdoba	Spain	Córdoba		As part of the emblem
	Cusco	Peru	Department of Cuzco	4 June 2021	see flag of Cusco
	De Hoeve	Netherlands	Friesland		
	Hermann	United States	Missouri		
	Ichikawa	Japan	Chiba Prefecture		
	Iznatoraf	Spain	Andalusia	2004	
	Kakogawa	Japan	Hyōgo Prefecture		
	Málaga	Spain	Andalusia	14 March 1509	
	Mancha Real	Spain	Andalusia	2000	
	Markushi	Ukraine	Khmelnytskyi Oblast		
	Montreal	Canada	Quebec	13 September 2017 (most recent version)	see Flag of Montreal
	Pegalajar	Spain	Province of Jaén, Andalusia		
	São Vicente	Brazil	São Paulo	22 March 1976	
	Saskatoon	Canada	Saskatchewan	1952	see flag of Saskatoon
	Siversk	Ukraine	Donetsk Oblast		
	Schönau	Germany	Baden-Württemberg		
	Tokyo	Japan	Tokyo	1 October 1964	see symbols of Tokyo
	Torredelcampo	Spain	Andalusia	2011	
	Vagharshapat	Armenia	Armavir Province		
	Valdepeñas de Jaén	Spain	Andalusia	2000	
	Villanueva del Arzobispo	Spain	Andalusia		

=== Historical ===
Image	City	Country	Administrative division	Years of usage	Notes
	Cusco	Peru	Department of Cuzco	1978–2021	see flag of Cusco
	Montreal	Canada	Quebec	1935–1939	see flag of Montreal
	Montreal	Canada	Quebec	1939–2017	see flag of Montreal
link to the image	Pocatello	United States	Idaho	2001–2017	unofficial flag; see flag of Pocatello, Idaho

== Naval flags ==
=== Current ===
Image	Flag	Country	Date of adoption	Notes
	Naval Ensign of the Bolivian Navy	Bolivia	2013	also known in Spanish as the "Bandera de Reintegración Marítima".

=== Historical ===
Image	Flag	Country	Years of usage	Notes
	Flag of the Ministry of the Navy	Second Spanish Republic	1931–1939	
	Flag of the captain general of the Spanish Republican Navy	Second Spanish Republic	1931–1939	
	Flag of the admiral of the Spanish Republican Navy	Second Spanish Republic	1931–1939	
	Flag of the viceadmiral of the Spanish Republican Navy	Second Spanish Republic	1931–1939	
	Flag of the viceadmiral (subordinate) of the Spanish Republican Navy	Second Spanish Republic	1931–1939	
	Flag of the rear admiral of the Spanish Republican Navy	Second Spanish Republic	1931–1939	
	Flag of the rear admiral (subordinate) of the Spanish Republican Navy	Second Spanish Republic	1931–1939	

== LGBTQ+ flags ==
Image	Flag	Year of adoption	Notes
	LGBT pride flag	1978	
	Bisexual flag	1998	
	Labrys lesbian flag	1999	
	Asexual pride flag	2010	
	Demisexual pride flag	2010	
	Gray asexual pride flag		
	Intersex flag	2013	
	Non-binary flag	2014	
	Philadelphia Pride Flag	2017	
	Progress Pride	2018	

== Political flags ==
Image	Flag	Year of adoption	Notes
	Anarcha-feminism	2004	see anarchist symbolism
	Castilian nationalism		
	Castilian nationalism, Castilian Left		
	Communist Party of Spain (Reconstituted), First of October Anti-Fascist Resistance Groups		
	International Brigades		
	Marxist–Leninist Party (Communist Reconstruction)		
	Independent Party	1982	
	Independent Party	1988	Flag used in during the 1988 Costa Rican elections
	Women's Social and Political Union		

== Ethnic flags ==
Image	Flag	Year of adoption	Notes
	Choctaw	1970s	
	Kuban Cossacks		Unofficial
	Hispanidad	1932	Winning entry in a contest organized by Juana de Ibarbourou
	Iroquois	1980s	see also Flag of the Iroquois Confederacy
	Tohono Oʼodham	2008	

== Religious flags ==
Image	Flag	Year of adoption	Notes
	Armenian Apostolic Church		
	Orange Order	c. 1795	see Flag of the Orange Order
	Orange Order		sometimes used in Orange Order marching bands; see Flag of the Orange Order

== Organizational flags ==
Image	Flag	Year of adoption	Notes
	Supreme Court of the Dominican Republic		

== See also ==
- List of flags by color
