= Rainbow flag =

Flag with the colors of the rainbow

Illustration of a flag using prism and non-prism rainbow colors

A rainbow flag is a multicolored flag consisting of the colors of the rainbow. The designs differ, but many of the colors are based on the seven spectral colors of the visible light spectrum.

== History ==
In the 18th century, American Revolutionary War writer Thomas Paine proposed that a rainbow flag be used as a maritime flag to signify neutral ships in time of war.

Contemporary international uses of a rainbow flag dates to the beginning of the 20th century. The International Co-operative Alliance adopted a rainbow flag in 1925. A similar flag (ca. 1920) is used in Andean indigenism in Peru and Bolivia to represent the legacy of the Inca Empire. Since 1961, the international peace flag, also known as the PACE flag, has been especially popular in Italy and to a lesser extent Europe and the rest of the world. Since 1978, when it was created to represent gay pride, the rainbow pride flag has evolved as a symbol of the LGBT movement (in 1978, the community as a whole was referred to and described as the "Gay" community; the term "LGBT" did not yet exist.)

There are several independent rainbow flags in use today.

== In cultures and movements ==
=== Reformation (1525) ===
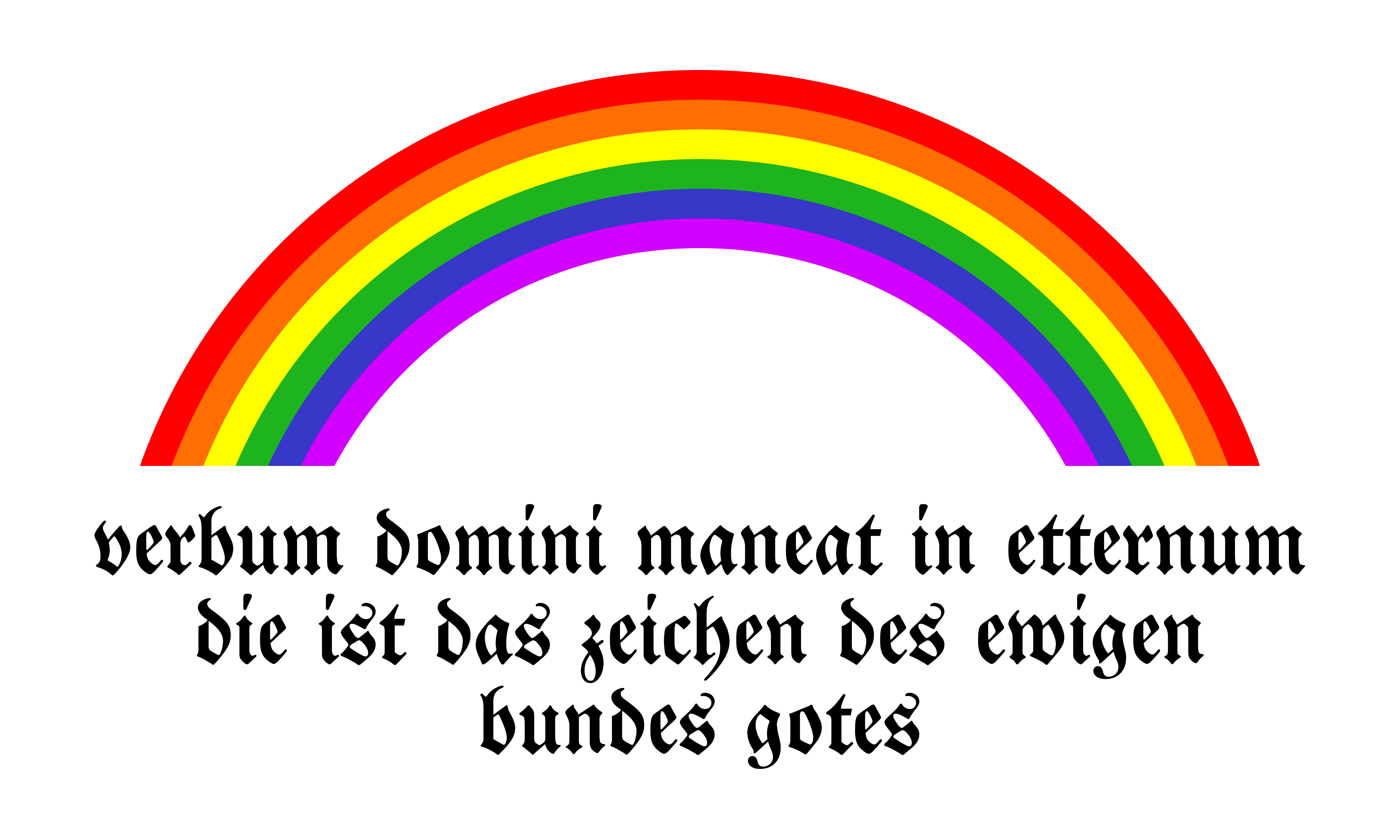
Replica of Thomas Müntzer's Rainbow Banner

The reformer Thomas Müntzer (1489–1525) connected socially revolutionary claims with his religious preaching (Genesis 9:11–17, Isaiah 40:8, 1 Peter 1:25). He is often portrayed with a rainbow banner in his hand. The Thomas Müntzer statue in the German town of Stolberg also shows him holding a rainbow banner in his hand.

In the German Peasants' War of the 16th century, Müntzer's rainbow banner together with the peasants' boot ("Bundschuh") was used as the sign of a new era, of hope and of social change.

The choice of the rainbow in the form of a flag harks back to the rainbow as a symbol of biblical promise. According to the Bible, God used the rainbow as a sign to Noah that there would never again be a worldwide flood, also known as the Rainbow covenant.

=== Armenian Republic proposed flag (1919) ===
Rainbow flag proposed for Armenia by artist Martiros Saryan

A rainbow flag was proposed for Armenia when it regained independence after World War I. It was designed by Armenian artist Martiros Saryan. It was not adopted as the country instead went with three stripes using the colors used in a past Armenian kingdom. The artist used muted, richer colors reflecting Armenian fabrics and carpets.

=== Cooperative movement (1921) ===
Until 2001, the International Cooperative Alliance used a rainbow flag.

A seven-colour rainbow flag is a common symbol of the international cooperative movement. The rainbow flag has been the cooperative emblem since 1921 when the International Co-operative Congress of World Co-op Leaders met in Basel, Switzerland to identify and define the growing cooperative movement's common values and ideals to help unite co-ops around the world.

In Essen, Germany in 1922, the International Co-operative Alliance (ICA) designed an international co-op symbol and a flag for the first "Co-operators' Day," which was held in July 1923. After some experiments with different designs, a famous French cooperator, Charles Gide, suggested using the seven colours of the rainbow for the flag. He pointed out that the rainbow symbolized unity in diversity and the power of light, enlightenment and progress. The first co-op rainbow flag was completed in 1924 and was adopted as an official symbol of the international cooperative movement in 1925.

In 2001, the ICA's official flag was changed from a rainbow flag to a rainbow logo flag on a white field, to clearly promote and strengthen the cooperative image, but still use the rainbow image. Other organizations sometimes use the traditional rainbow flag as a symbol of cooperation.

Like the rainbow, this flag is a symbol of hope and peace. The seven colours from flags around the world fly in harmony. Each of the seven colours in the co-operative flag have been assigned the following meaning:

- red: stands for courage
- orange: offers the vision of possibilities
- yellow: represents the challenge that green has kindled
- green: indicates a challenge to co-operators to strive for growth of membership and of understanding of the aims and values of co-operation
- light blue: suggests far horizons – the need to provide education and help less fortunate people and strive toward global unity
- dark blue: suggests pessimism – a reminder that less fortunate people have needs that may be met through the benefits of cooperation
- violet: is the colour of warmth, beauty, and friendship

The ICA has been flying a flag with its official logo since April 2001, when its Board decided to replace the traditional rainbow flag. Its use by a number of non-cooperative groups led to confusion in several countries around the world.

=== Peace movement (1961) ===
PACE flag (Italian for 'peace')

This rainbow flag in Italy was first used in a peace march in 1961, inspired by similar multi-coloured flags used in demonstrations against nuclear weapons. It became popular with the Pace da tutti i balconi ("peace from every balcony") campaign in 2002, started as a protest against the impending war in Iraq. The most common variety has seven colours, purple, blue, azure, green, yellow, orange and red, and is emblazoned in bold with the Italian word PACE, meaning "peace".

Common variations include moving the purple stripe down below the azure one, and adding a white stripe on top (the original flag from the 60s had a white stripe on top). This flag has been adopted internationally as a symbol of the peace movement.

=== Andean indigenism (1973, 2009) ===
Flag of Cusco, 1973–2021

Flag of Cusco, 2021

Wiphala, 2009

The Flag of Cusco was introduced in Peru in 1973, and became used as the official emblem of the city of Cusco. In 2007, the municipality decided to modify the flag design so that it would not be confused with the Gay Pride flag. The new flag design was implemented in 2021. In Ecuador, a rainbow emblem is used by the Pachakutik political party (1995), which is composed mostly of left-wing indigenous people.

A seven-striped rainbow flag design is used in Peru, Bolivia and Ecuador as a symbol of native ethnic groups and culture, and is anachronistically associated with the Tawantin Suyu, or Inca territory. Although commonly believed in Peru to be a flag of the Incan Empire, the oldest known rainbow flag dates back only to the 18th century and was used by Túpac Amaru II during his indigenous revolt against the Spanish. María Rostworowski, a Peruvian historian known for her extensive and detailed publications about Peruvian Ancient Cultures and the Inca Empire, said about this: "I bet my life, the Inca never had that flag, it never existed, no chronicler mentioned it". The National Academy of Peruvian History has stated on the topic: "The official use of the wrongly called 'Tawantinsuyu flag' is a mistake. In the pre-Hispanic Andean world the concept of flags did not exist, it did not belong to their historic context".

=== LGBTQ+ (Lesbian, Gay, Bisexual, Transgender, Queer, and more) Pride (1978) ===
Originally called the "Gay pride" flag, the six-band version became the most widely recognized since 1979, and now represents the LGBTQ movement.

The rainbow Pride flag was created as a symbol for the gay community by San Francisco artist Gilbert Baker in 1978. The different colors are often associated with "diversity" in the gay community, but actually have symbolic meanings. The flag is used predominantly at LGBT pride events and in gay villages worldwide in various forms including banners, clothing and jewelry. Since the 1990s, its symbolism has been applied by the extended "LGBTQ" (lesbian, gay, bisexual, transgender, queer) community through differentiated flag designs. In 1994, for the 25th anniversary of the Stonewall riots in New York city, a mile-long rainbow flag was created by Baker which he later cut into sections that were distributed around the world.

The flag was originally created with eight colors, but pink and turquoise were removed for production purposes, and since 1979 it has consisted of six colored stripes. It is most commonly flown with the red stripe on top, as the colors appear in a natural rainbow. The colors were determined to symbolize:

- red: life
- orange: healing
- yellow: sunlight
- green: nature
- blue: harmony/peace
- purple/violet: spirit

The color pink stood for sexuality and turquoise stood for art/magic.

During the 1980s, a black stripe representing AIDS victims was added to the bottom of a rainbow flag as a seventh color and named the "Victory Over AIDS" flag.

In the late 2010s, the 1978 Pride flag by Gilbert Baker was annexed with separate flags containing additional colors representing individual segments of the LGBT community: in 2017, a collaboration between the Philadelphia Office of LGBTQ+ Affairs and the Tierney Agency added a brown and a black stripe at the top of the Pride flag to symbolize black and brown people of color, naming the design the "More Color, More Pride" (aka "Philly Pride") flag; and in 2018, the "Progress Pride" flag by Daniel Quasar incorporated the black and brown stripes of the Philly Pride flag, and colors of the 1999 transgender flag by Monica Helms, as a chevron on the Pride flag symbolizing queer, trans, and people of color. However, unlike the Gilbert Baker flag, transgender flag, and "More Color, More Pride" flag designs which are in the public domain, the Progress Pride flag is copyrighted and fees are paid to Quasar for commercial duplication and sales of the design.

=== Basque nationalism (1978) ===
Herri Batasuna flag (Basque nationalism)

The leftist Herri Batasuna party used a rainbow version of the Ikurriña (Basque national flag) from 1978 until it was dissolved in 2001.

=== Jewish Autonomous Oblast (1996) ===
Flag of the Jewish Autonomous Oblast

Another variation of rainbow flag is used by Jewish Autonomous Oblast, situated in the Far Eastern Federal District of Russia, by the Chinese border. Proportions 2:3. Adopted first of October 1996.

The Jewish Autonomous Oblast has a flag with a seven-colour rainbow. The number of colours is meant to symbolize the seven-branched Jewish Menorah. Its colours are slightly different from the basic spectral colours, with gold in place of yellow, vivid blue instead of light blue, and indigo as dark blue. In 2013, the flag was checked according to the Russian gay propaganda law. JAO flag was confirmed as safe because of white background, white borders to the stripes and the seventh (light blue) colour.

=== Infection prevention thorough declaration sticker (2020) ===
The Tokyo Metropolitan Government issued the "Thorough Infection Prevention Declaration Sticker" for the purpose of working on the infection spread prevention guidelines for businesses formulated by the metropolitan government. In the media, it is also known as the rainbow sticker. A checklist that businesses should take to prevent the spread of infection is checked on the web and issued online, and it is used as a guideline to show that businesses are working on infection prevention measures.

=== Support for the NHS (2020) ===
During the 2020 coronavirus pandemic in the United Kingdom, the rainbow symbol has been used to signify support and gratitude for the National Health Service (NHS). However, the increasing association of the six-color Pride rainbow flag with the NHS has caused concern among some members of the LGBT community that it is being disassociated "as a symbol of LGBT equality" and may lead to the erasure of identity.

== Other rainbow flags ==
Buddhist flag

Druze star

Civil flag of Jabal ad-Druze (1921-1936)

Flag of the Druze people

Foz do Jordão, Brazil, municipality flag

Gay pride flag (June 1978)
(original eight-color version)

Gay pride flag (November 1978)
(seven-color version)

Greek peace flag (Eirene)

Hallum, Netherlands, village flag

Lingua Franca Nova flag

PACE flag without text

Pernambuco, Brazil, state flag

Progress Pride flag (2018)
(denoting lesbian, gay, bisexual, transgender, queer, and black and brown people of color)

Republic of China flag (1912–1928)

Santa Cruz County, California, flag

South Africa flag
(commonly called "Rainbow Flag" because of its 6 colours)

West Hollywood, California, city flag

Whittier, California, city flag

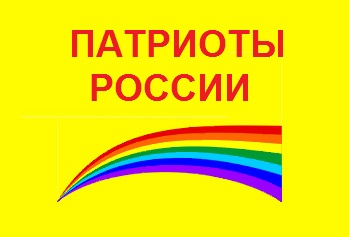
Patriots of Russia flag (2005–2013)

World Peace Flag of Earth (1913)
(proposed by James William van Kirk)

== Use of a rainbow flag in various settings ==
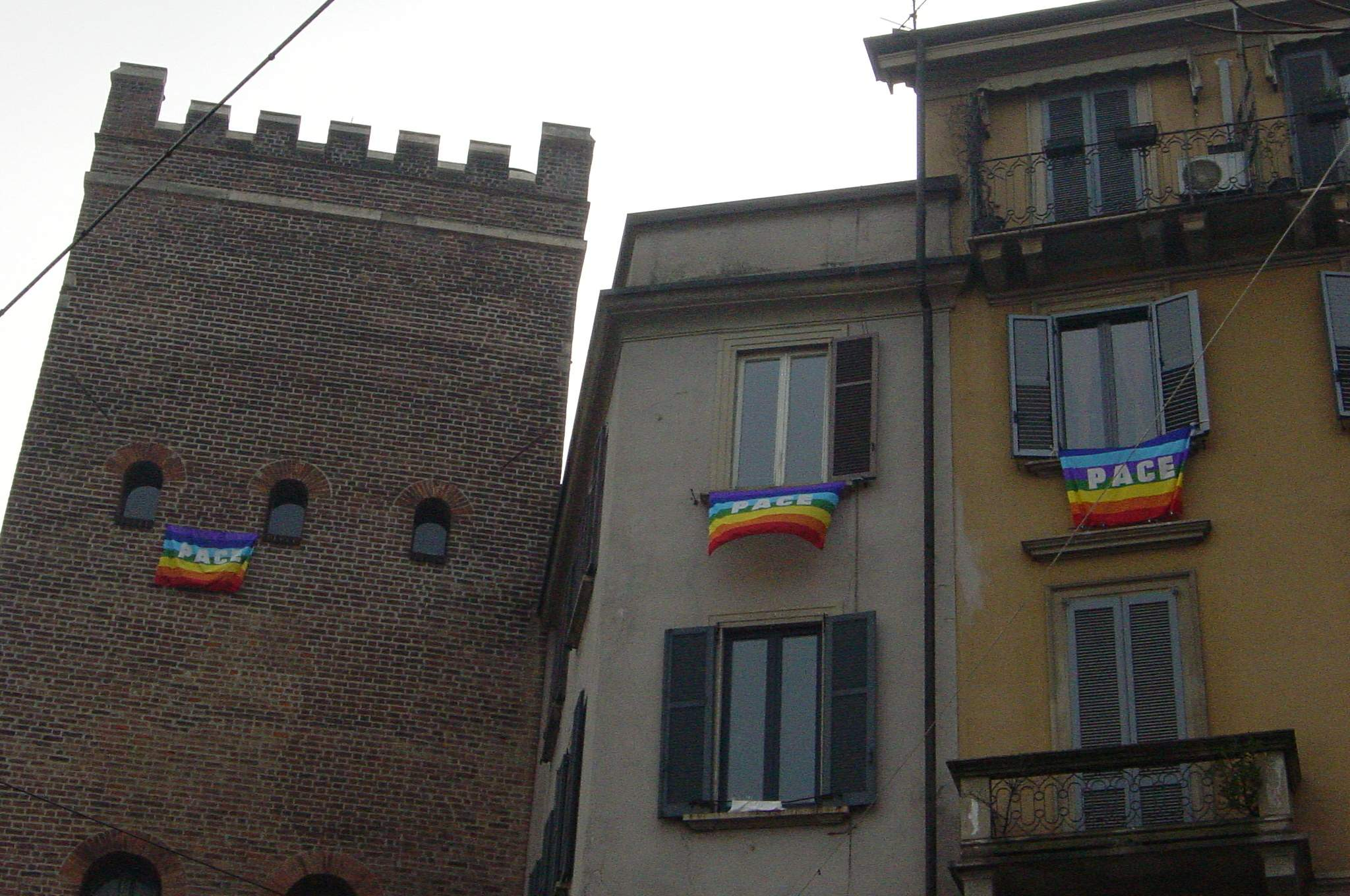
"Pace da tutti i balconi": peace flags hanging from windows, Milan, Italy (March 2003)

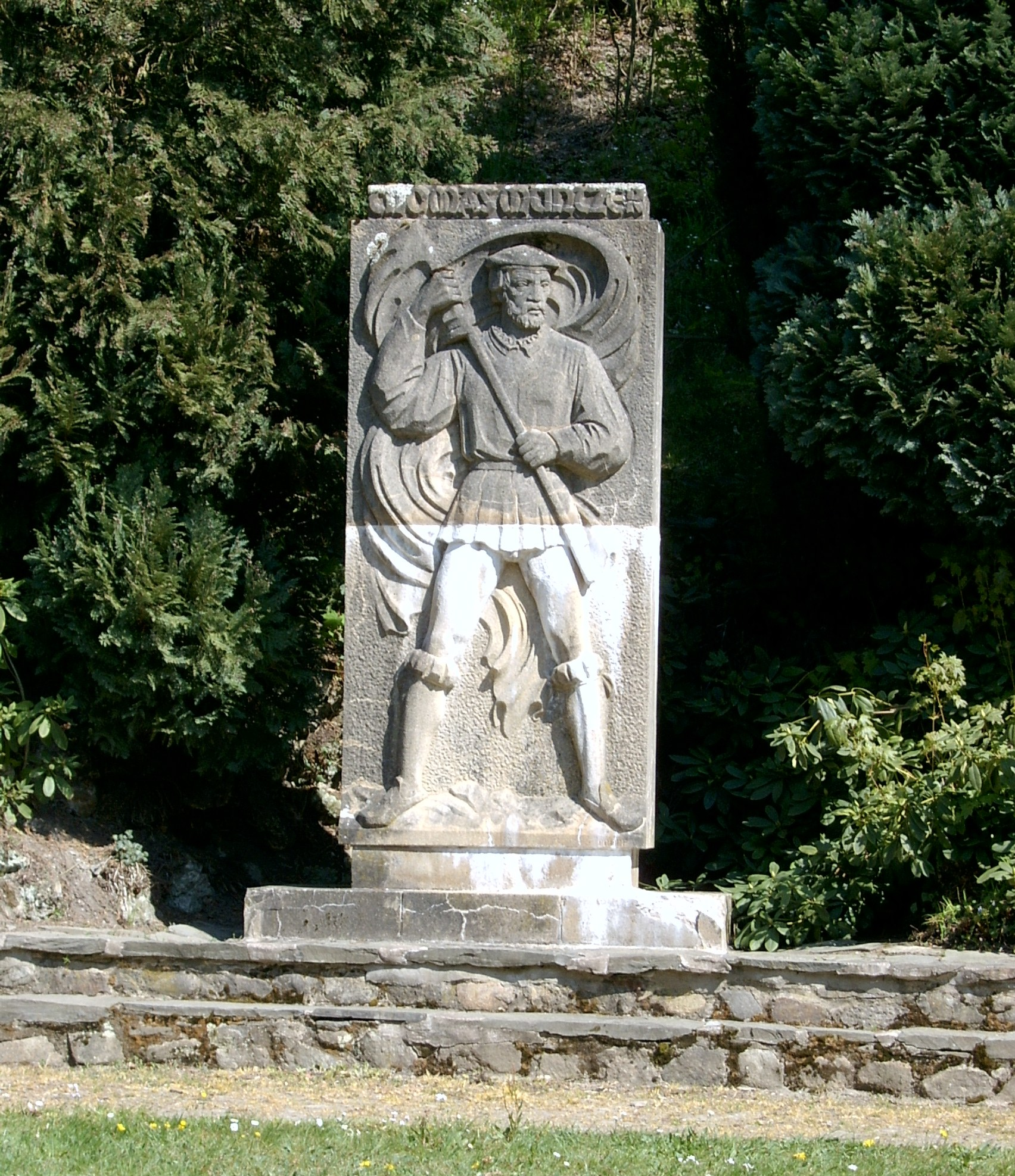
Statue of Thomas Müntzer waving a rainbow banner, Stolberg, Germany (2007)

=== LGBTQ+ Pride rainbow flag in various settings ===
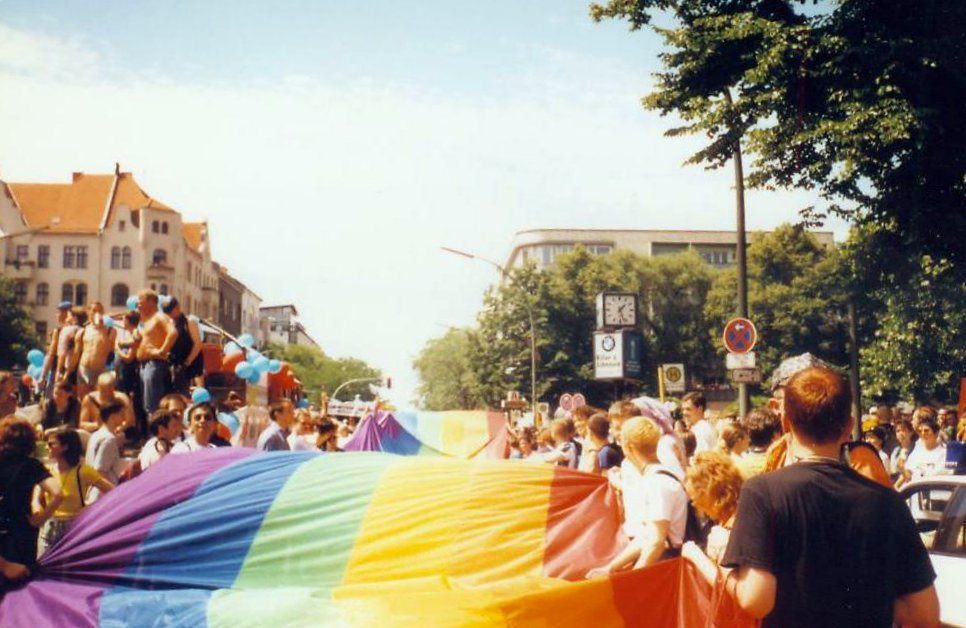
Marchers carry the LGBT pride flag at the pride parade on Christopher Street Day, Berlin, Germany (1997)

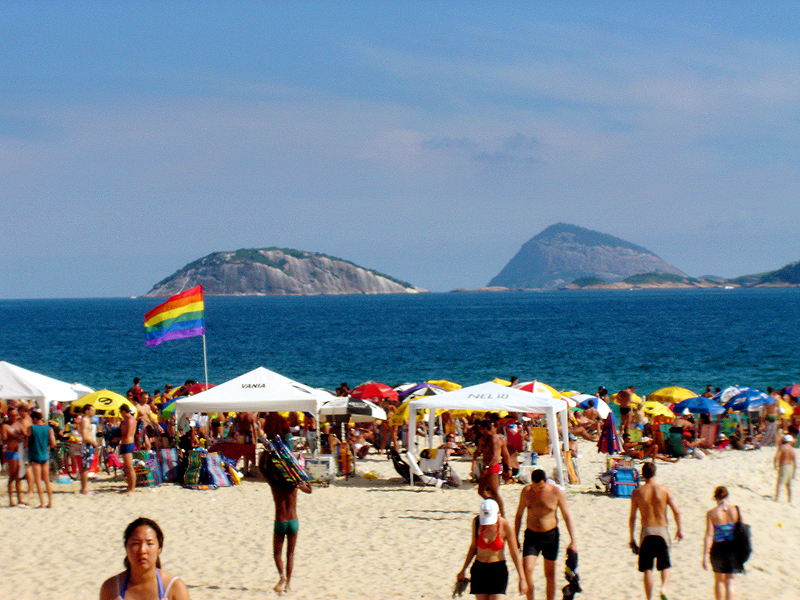
LGBT flag at Ipanema Beach, Rio de Janeiro, Brazil (2006)

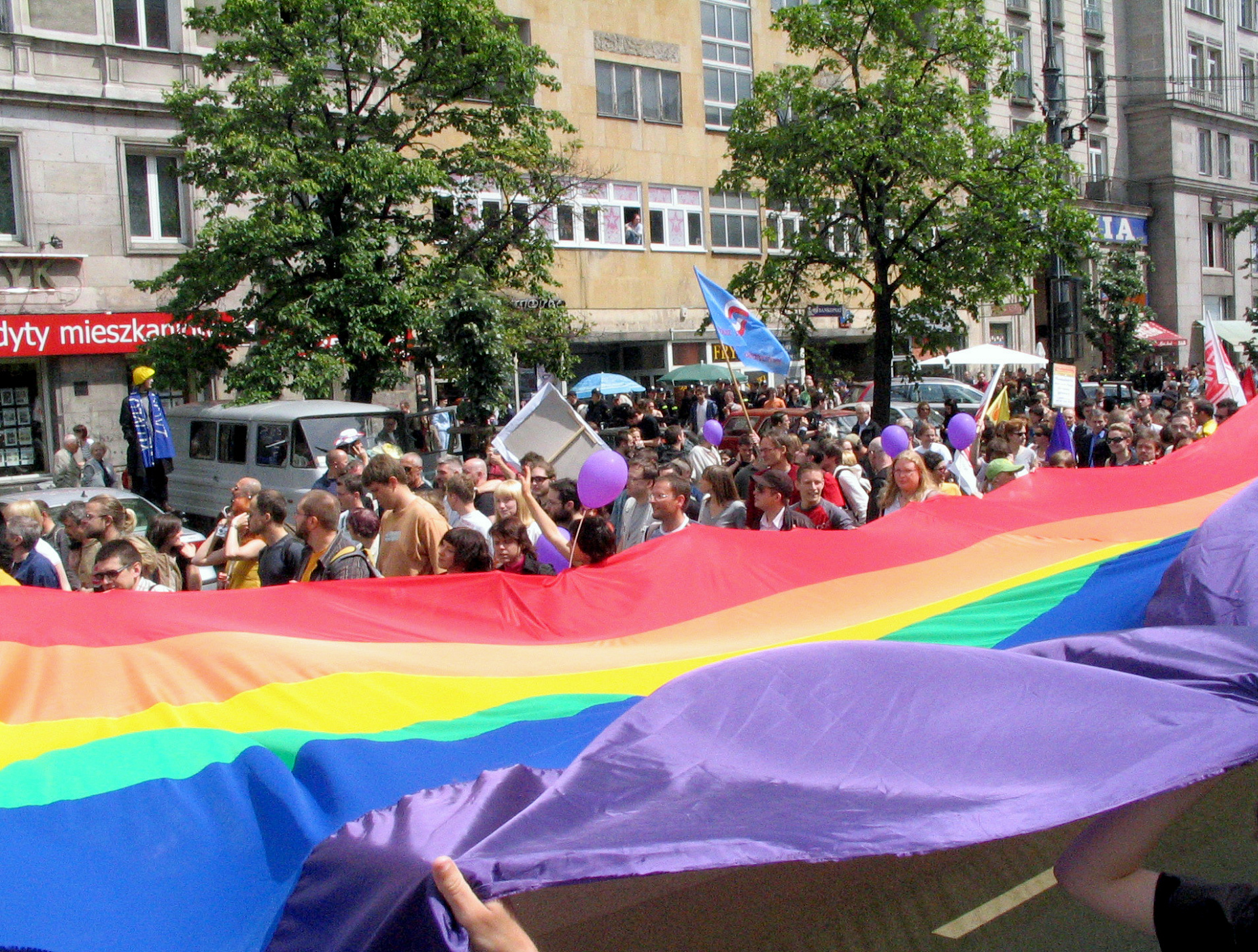
Equality Parade in Warsaw, Poland (2006)

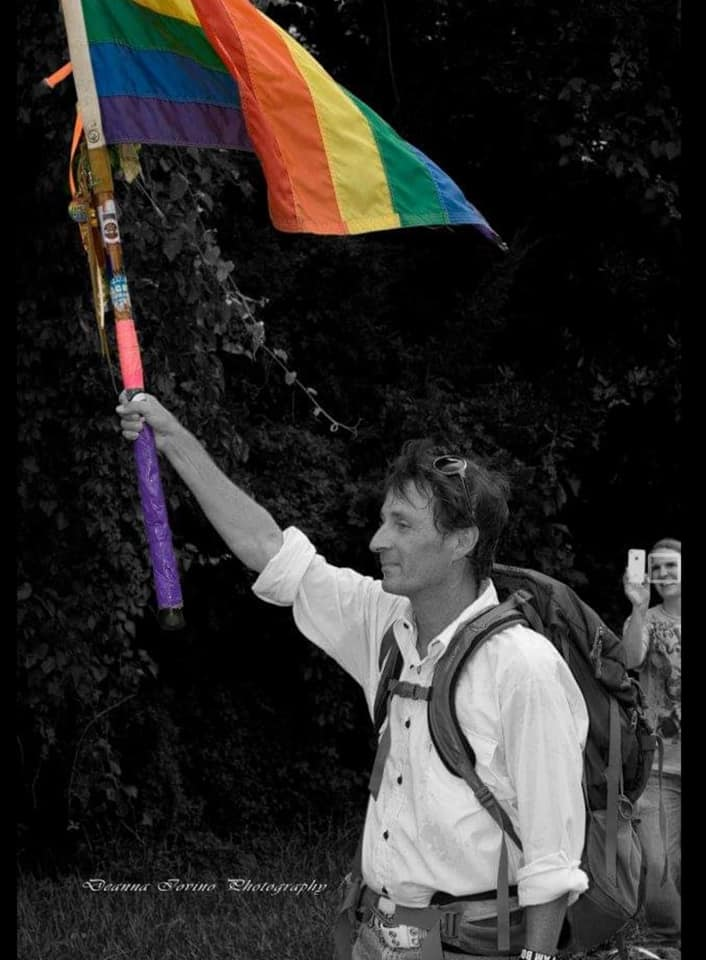
Finish line of "Civil Rights Walk Across America" by Richard Noble, Jacksonville, Florida (2012)

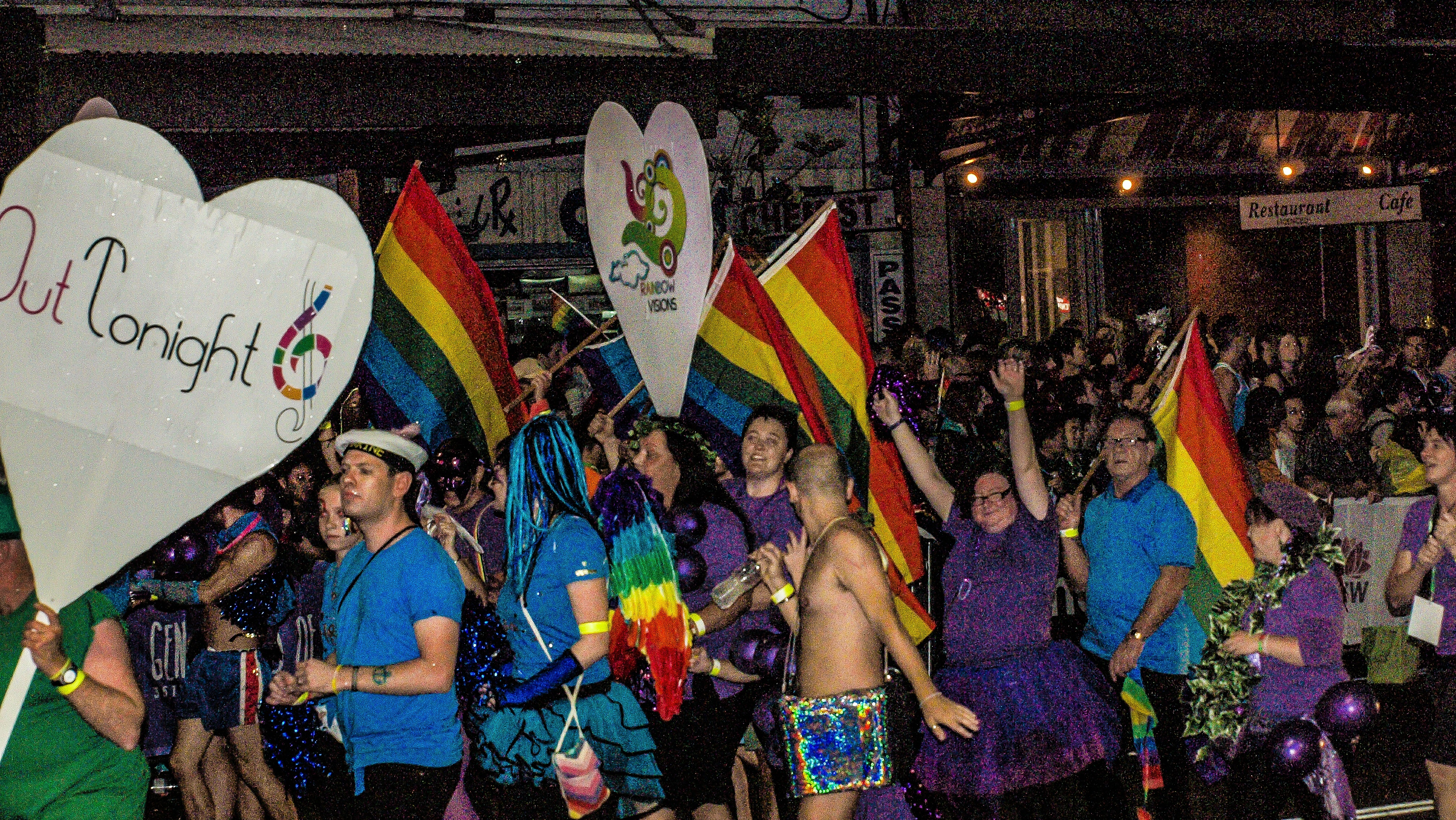
Participants in the Sydney Gay and Lesbian Mardi Gras with LGBT rainbow flags (2013)

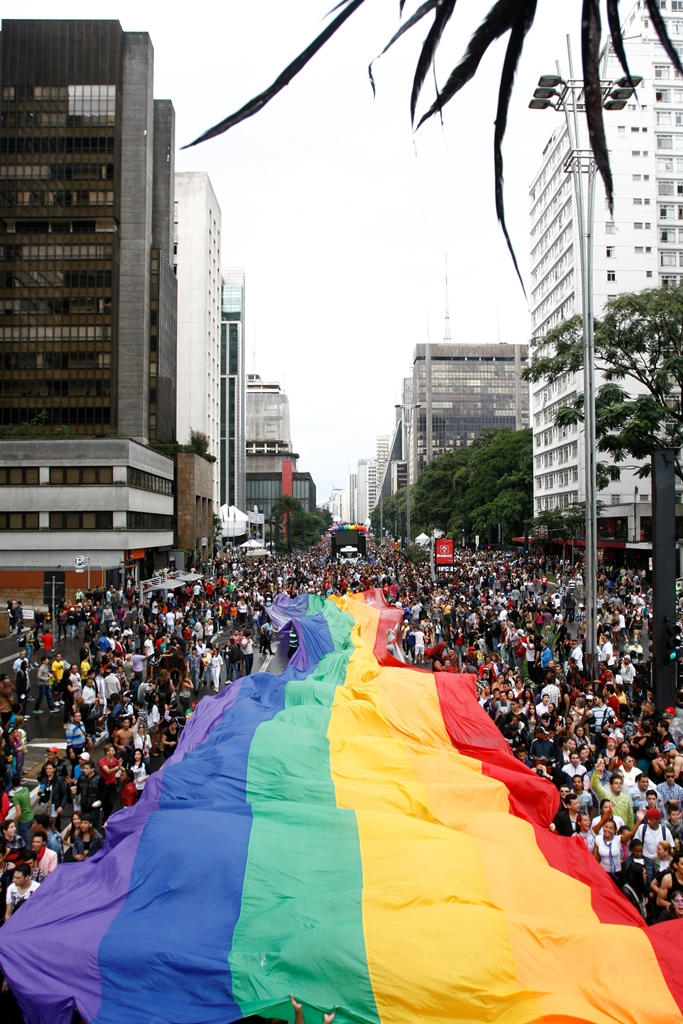
Rainbow flag being carried in the São Paulo LGBTQ Pride (2013)

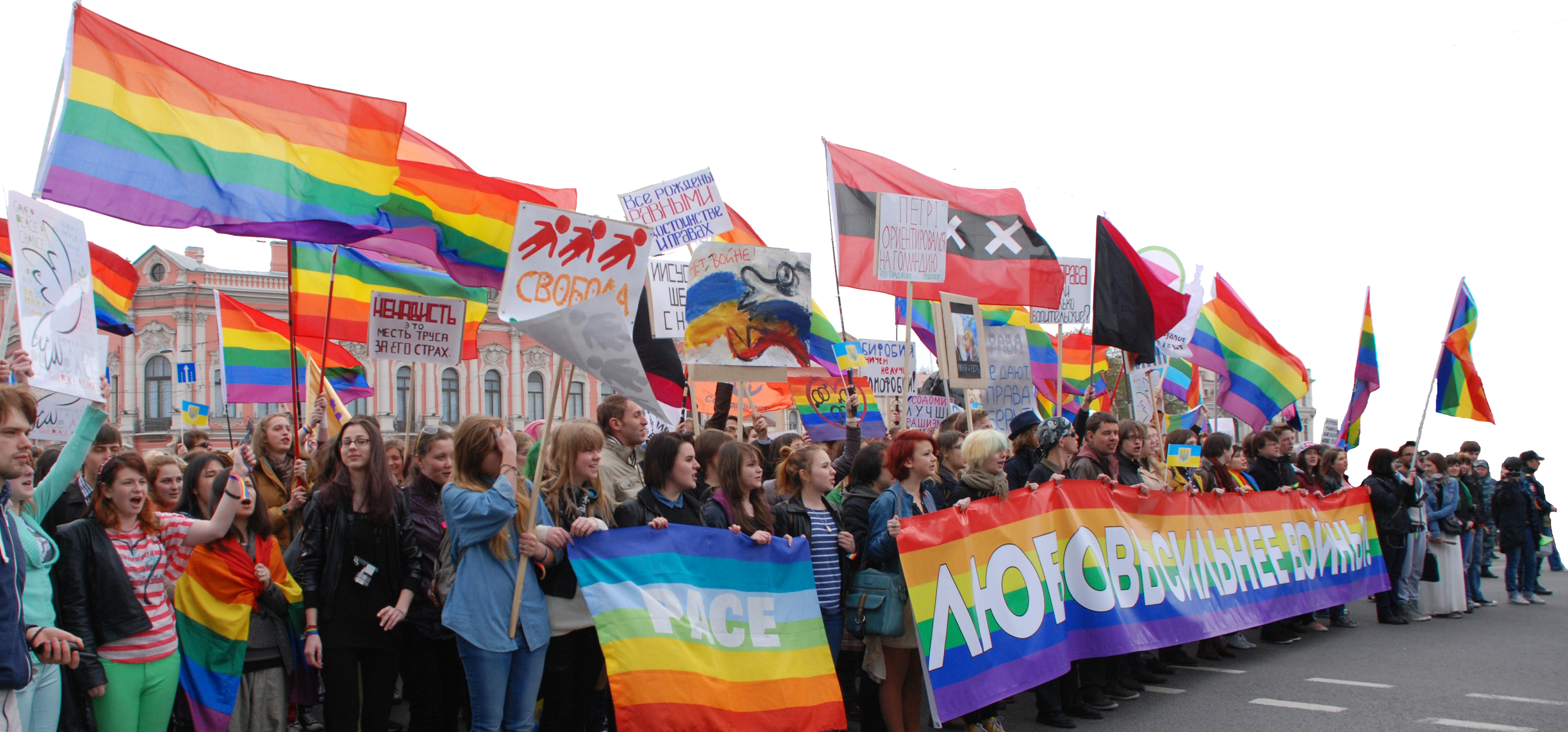
Rainbow pride flags at a Saint Petersburg LGBT Column demonstration against the war in Ukraine and Russia. (2014)

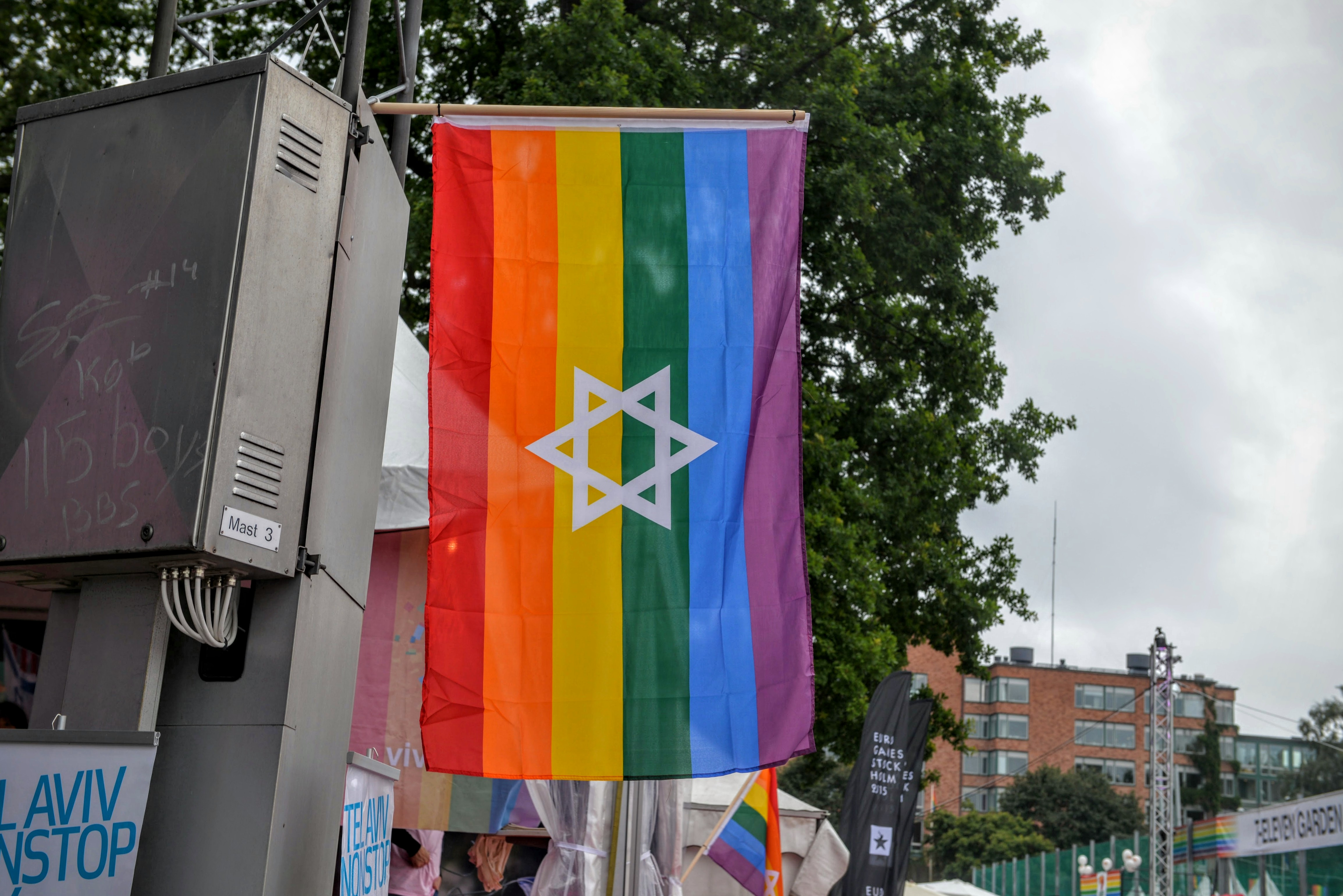
Jewish Gay Pride flag at Stockholm Pride, Sweden (2015)

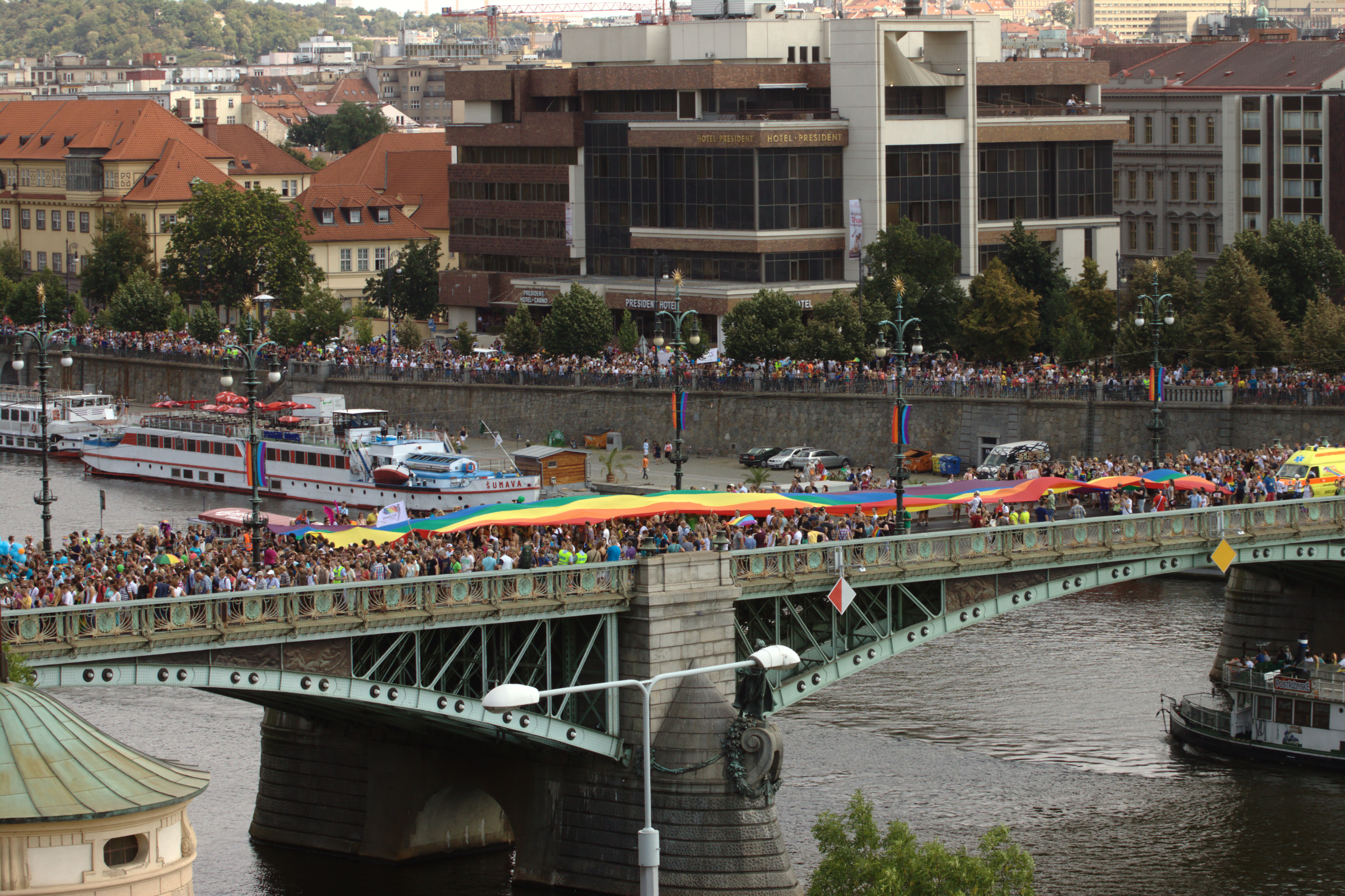
A Rainbow pride flag being carried across the Čechův Bridge during Prague pride parade (2015)

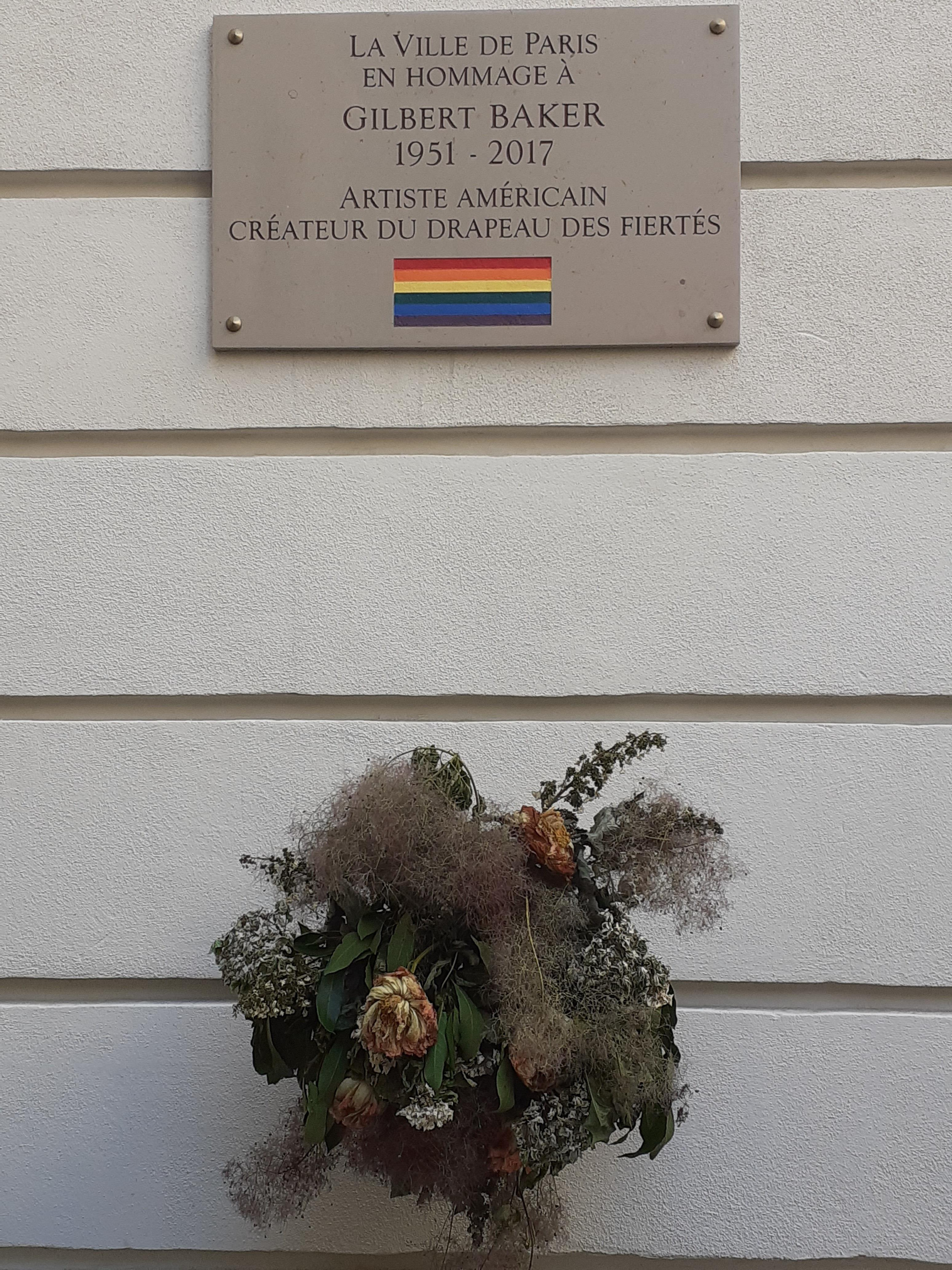
French official Memorial to Gilbert Baker, Place des Emeutes de Stonewall, Paris, Le Marais, France (2020)

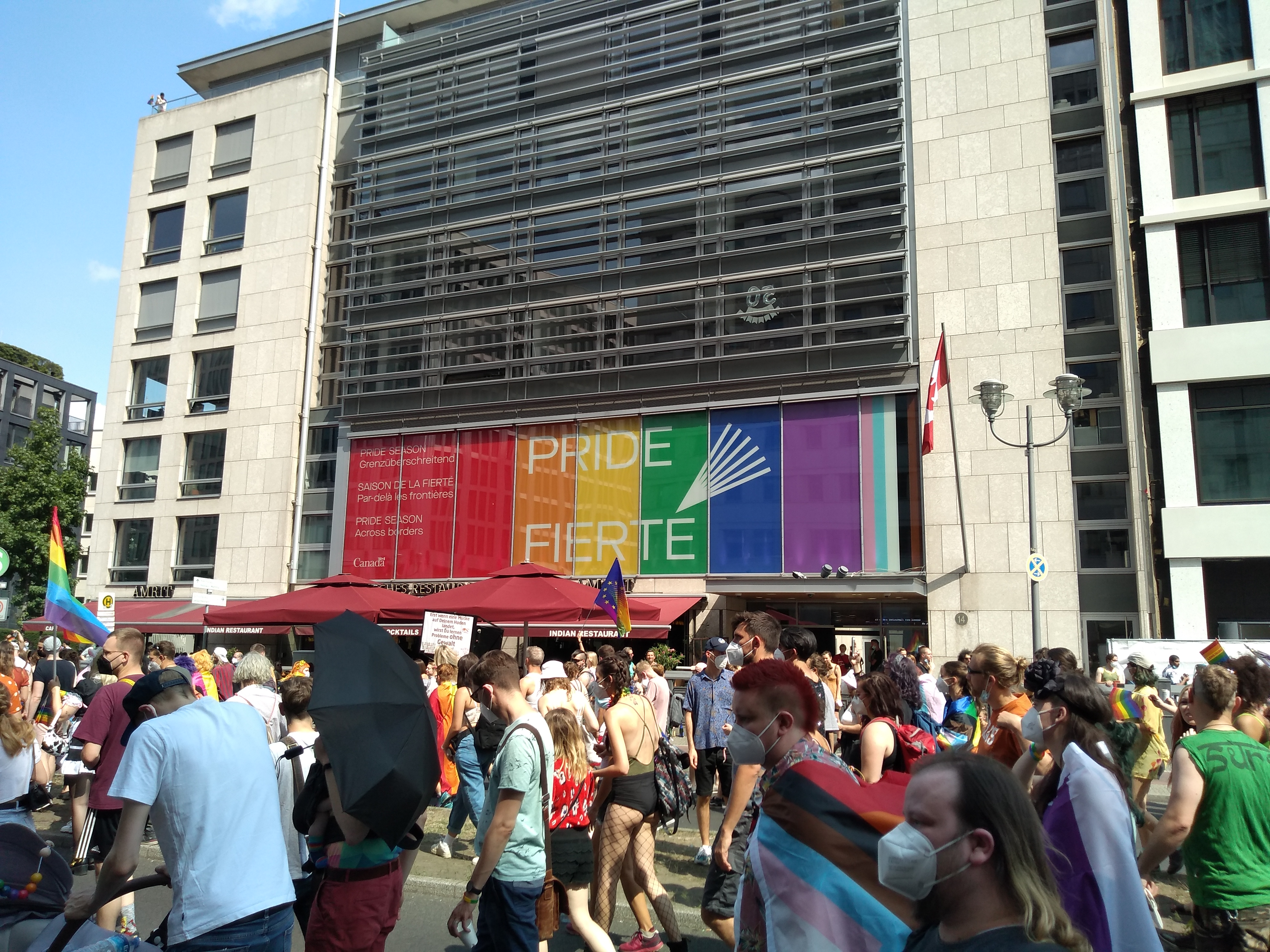
Participants in the Christopher Street Day parade in Berlin walking past the Canadian embassy that is advertising the Montreal Pride festival with a rainbow flag (2021)

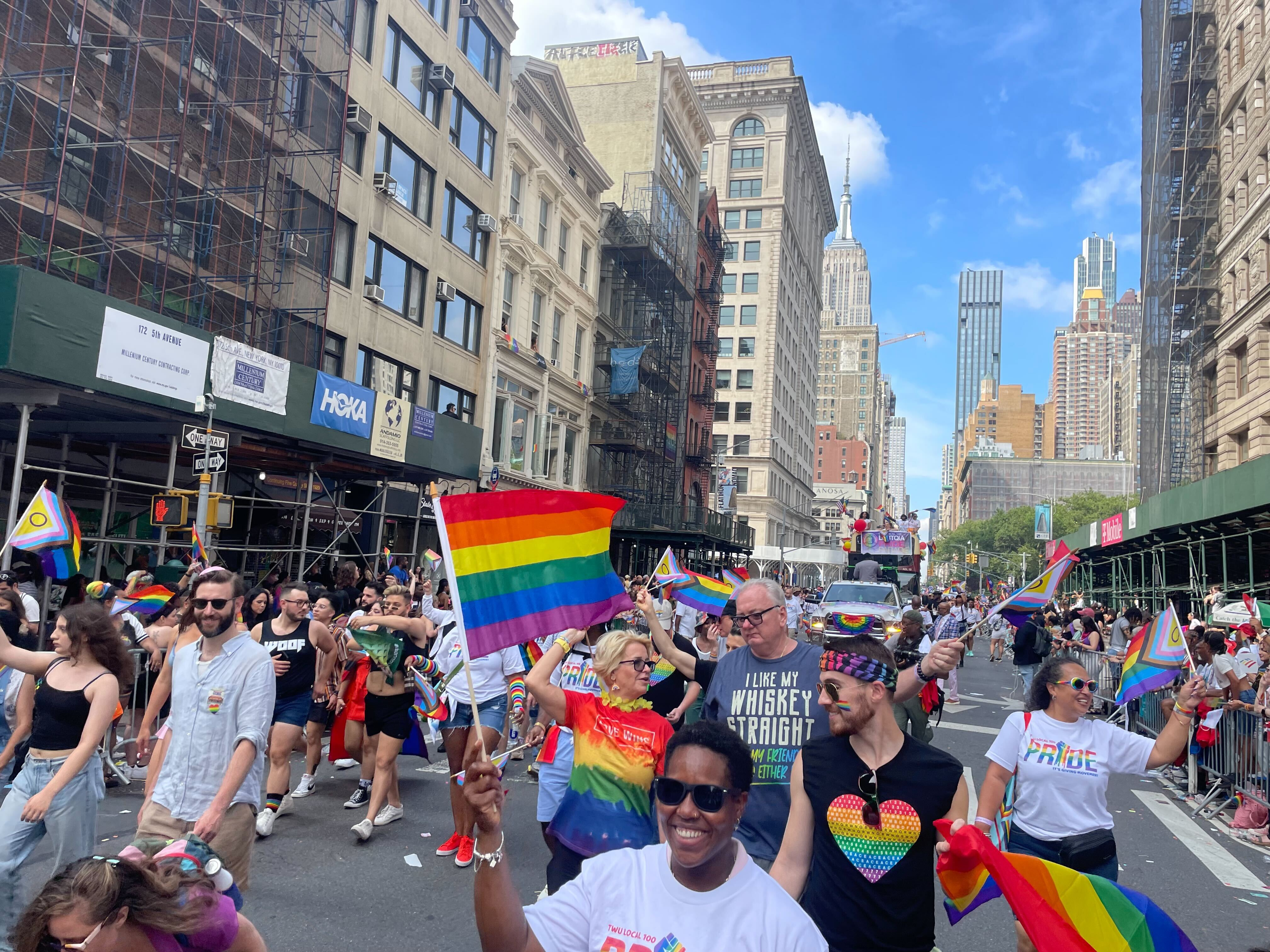
Rainbow pride flags at New York City Pride March, New York (2023)

== Use of rainbow flag colors in different designs ==
American flag in Gay Pride colors

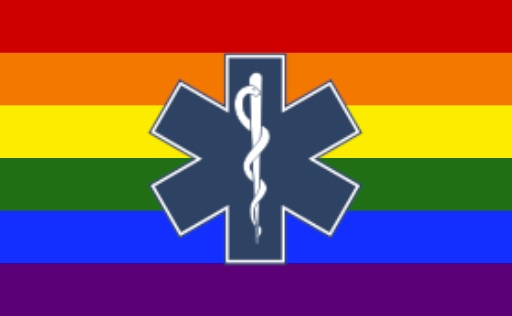
LGBT health awareness

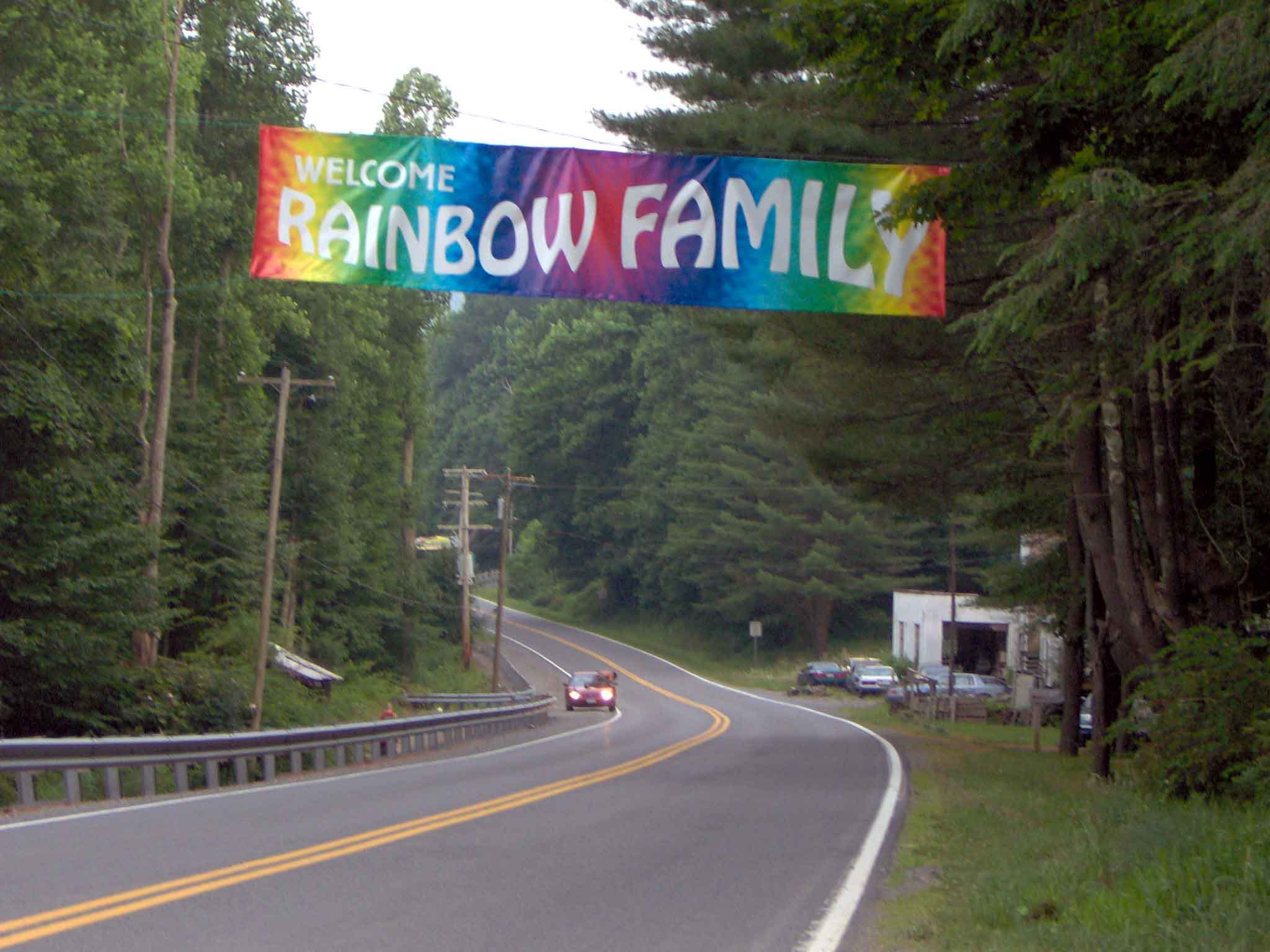
Rainbow Family of Living Light banner

Circular Rainbow Flag of Wu-Wo Tea Ceremony

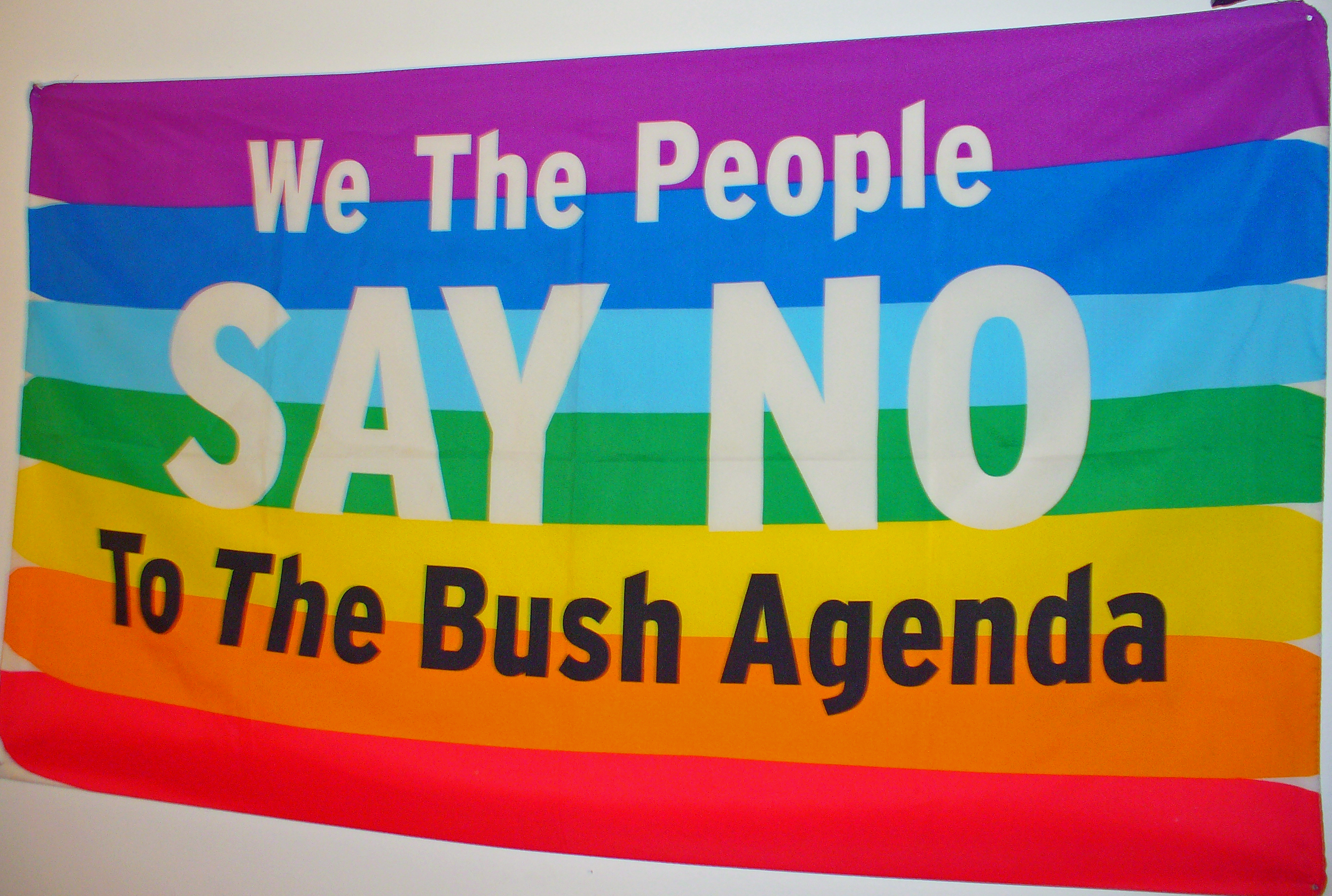
Rainbow protest flag used by Not in Our Name

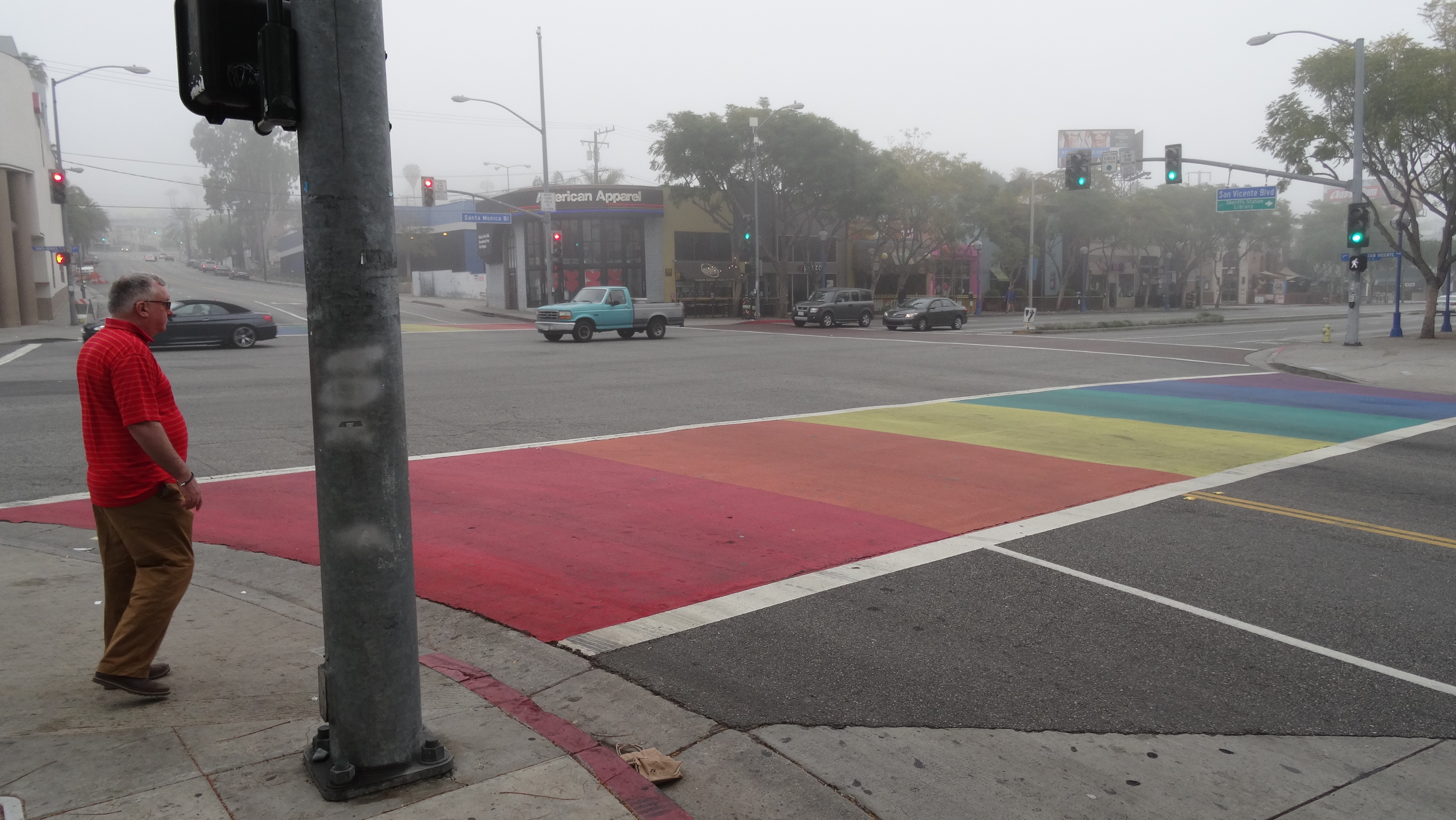
Rainbow crossing on Santa Monica Boulevard in West Hollywood, California for Los Angeles Pride (2016)

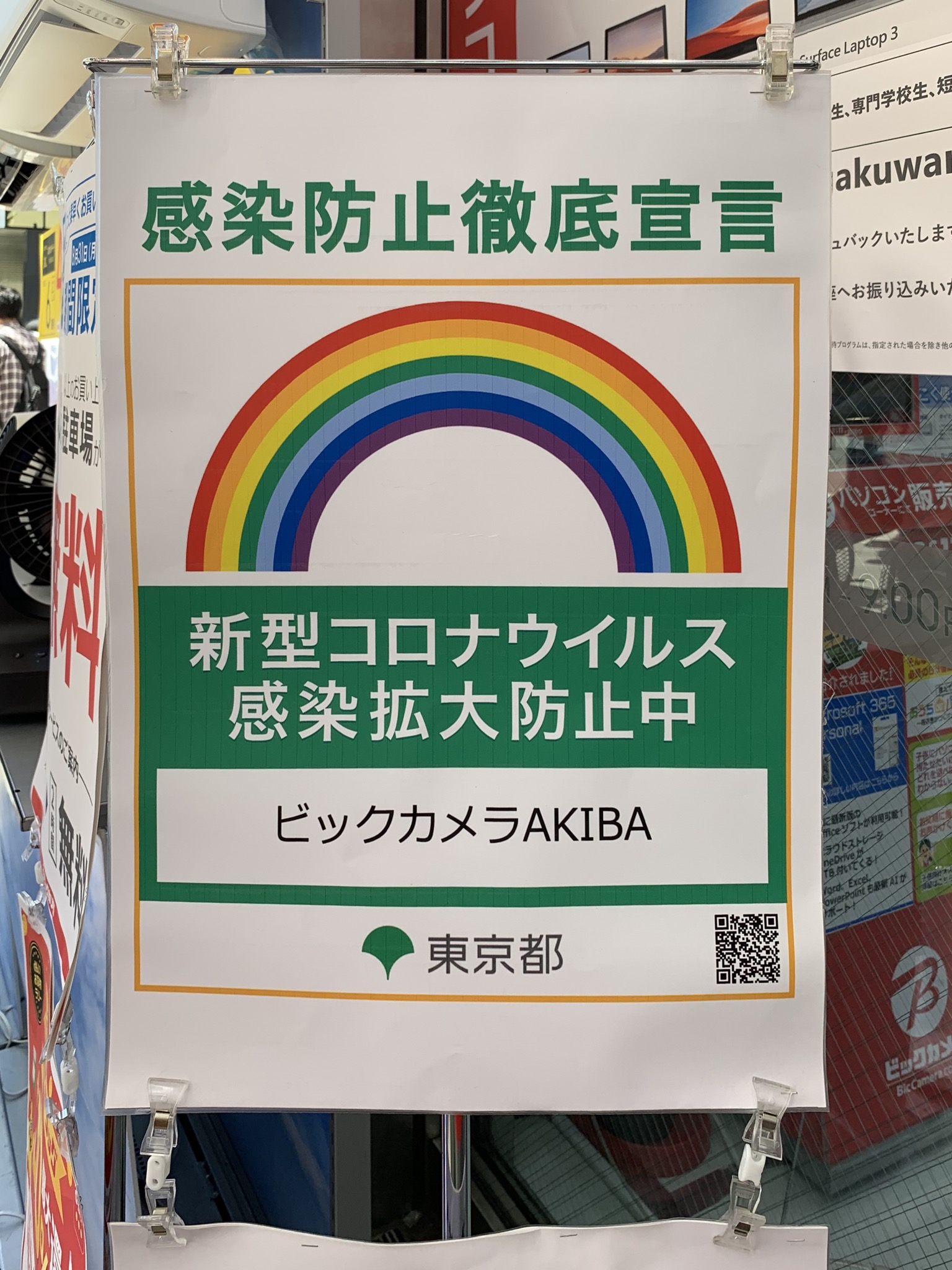
Thorough Infection Prevention Declaration Sticker (Tokyo Metropolitan Government) (2020)

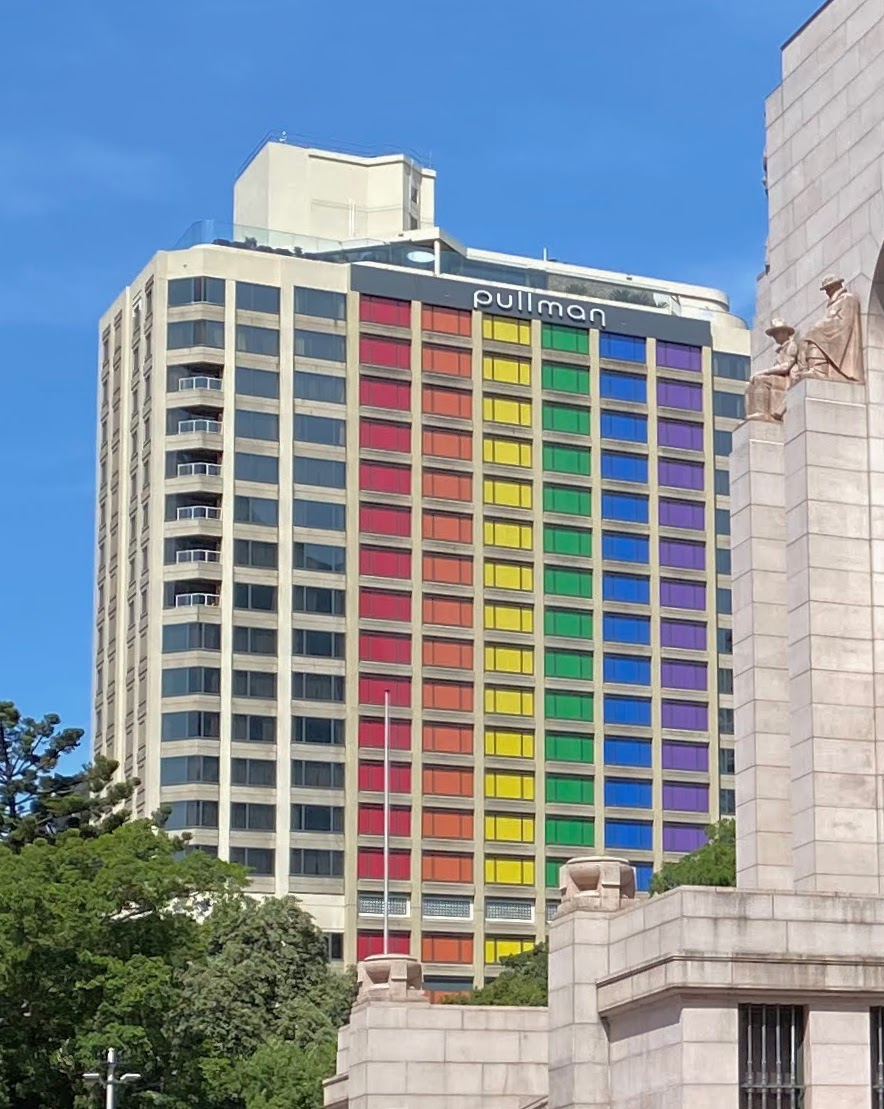
Hotel adjacent to Hyde Park with LGBT rainbow flag colors displayed on its side for WorldPride, Sydney, Australia (2023)

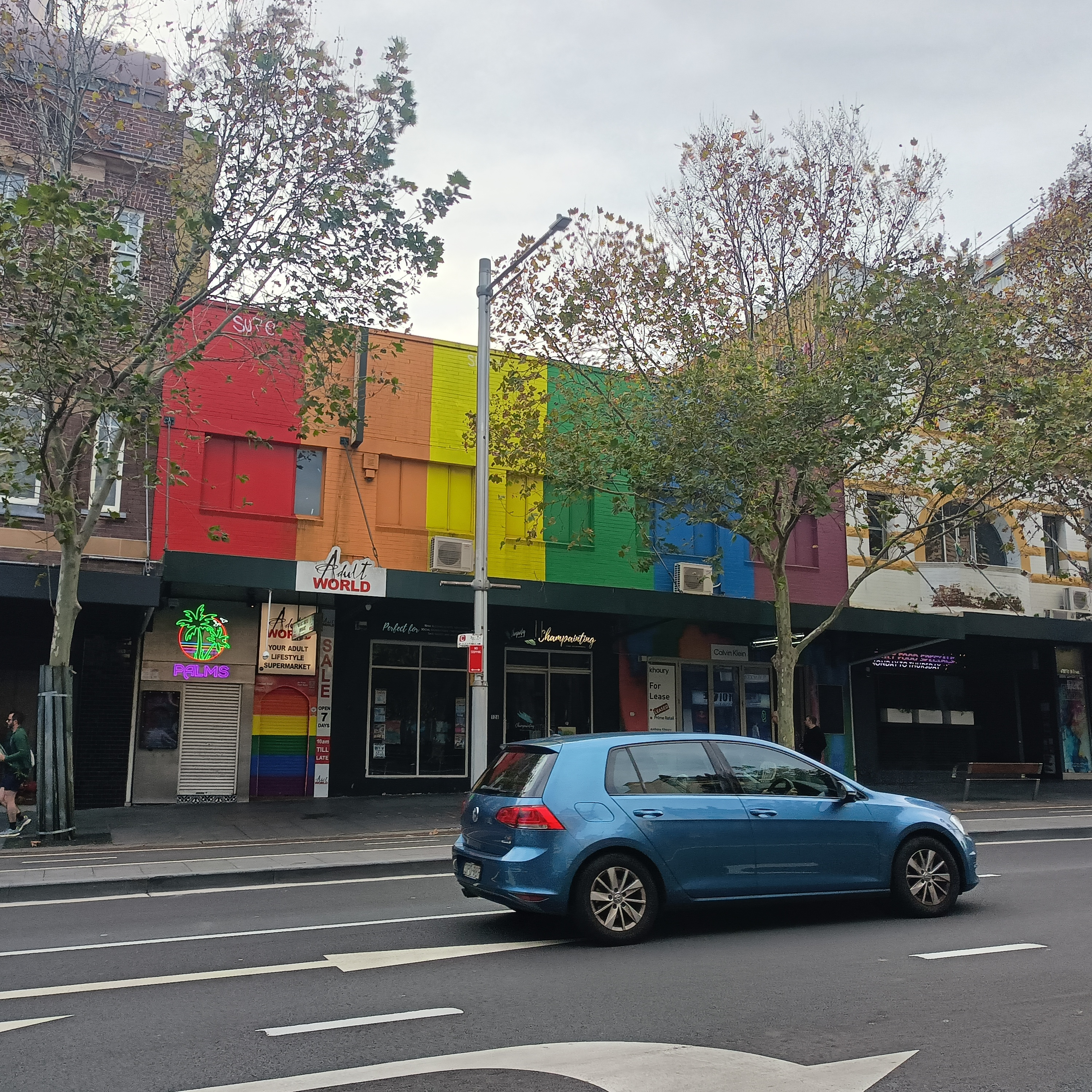
Rainbow flag colors on the exterior façade and doorway of a sex shop in Darlinghurst, Sydney, Australia (2026)

== Flags containing a rainbow design ==
Flag of Nicaragua

Flag of El Salvador

== See also ==
- Rainbows in culture
