= Flag of Dominica =

Commonwealth of Dominica
- Use: Civil and state flag, civil and state ensign
- Proportion: 1:2
- Adopted: 3 November 1978 (last modified 3 November 1990)
- Design: A green field with the centred cross of three bands: the vertical part is: yellow, black and white and the horizontal part is: yellow, black and white and the red disk superimposed at the centre of the cross bearing a purple sisserou parrot facing the hoist-side encircled by ten green five-pointed stars.
- Designed by: Alwin Bully
- Use: Presidential Standard
- Design: A green field with the coat of arms of Dominica at the centre

The national flag of Dominica was adopted on 3 November 1978, with some small changes having been made in 1981, 1988, and 1990. The original flag was designed by playwright Alwin Bully in early 1978 as the country prepared for independence.

It is one of the few flags of sovereign states to contain purple.

== History and design ==
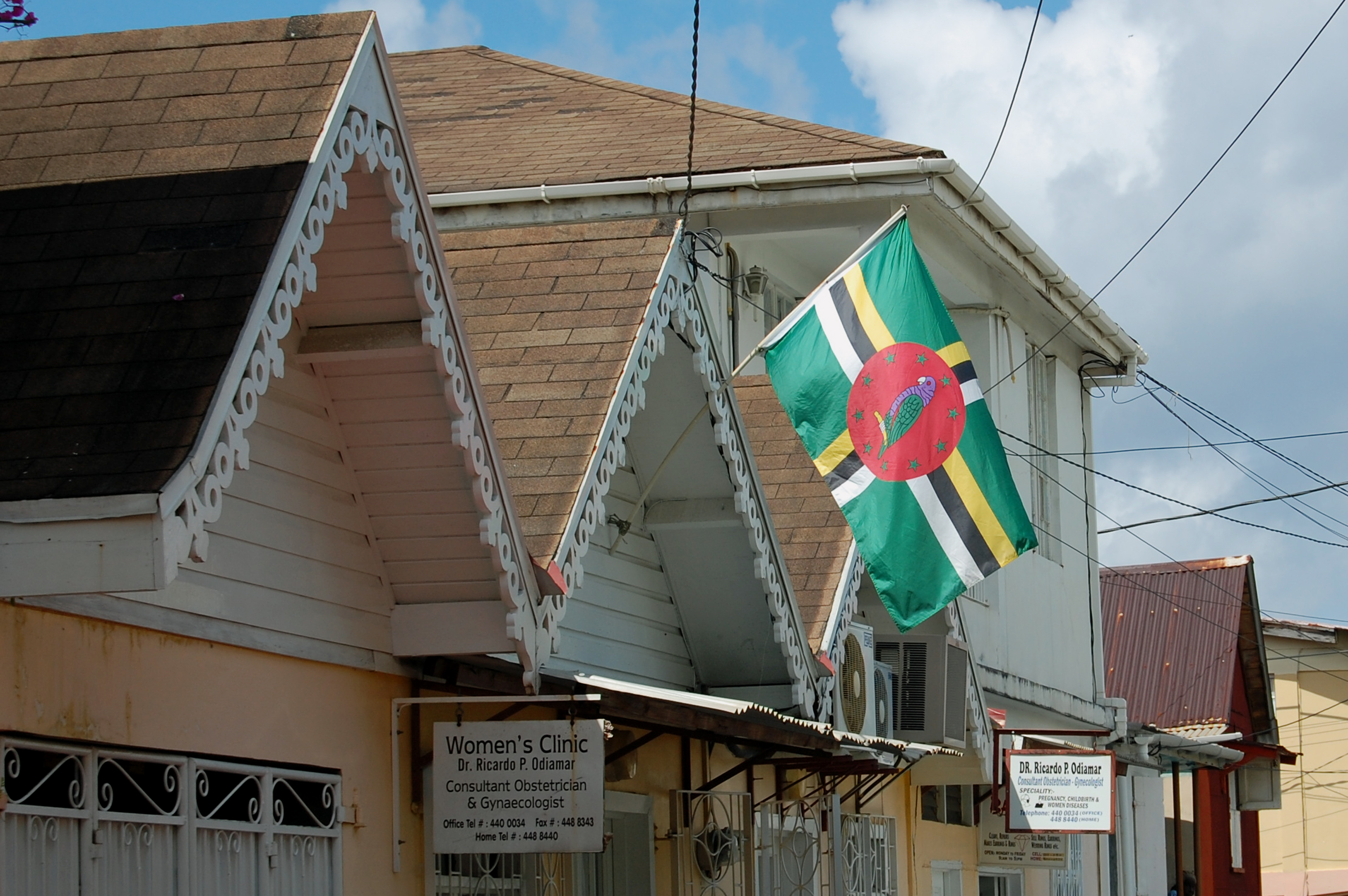
Building in Roseau with the flag

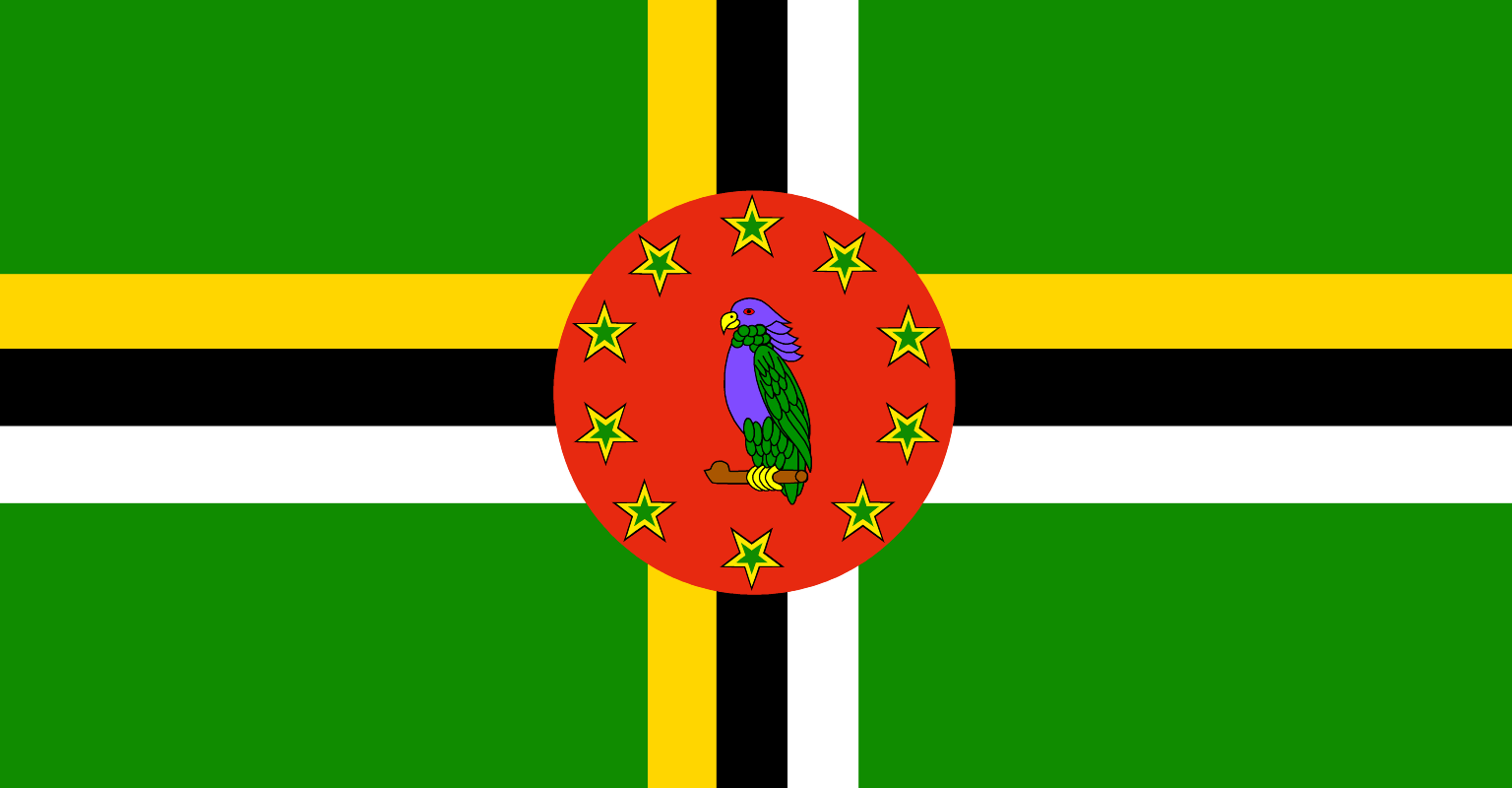
Variant using a light green shade

The flag, adopted in 1978, features the national bird emblem, the sisserou parrot (Amazona imperialis), which also appears on the coat of arms of Dominica as two supporters in the achievement, granted on 21 July 1961. This parrot, endemic to Dominica, is an endangered species with a population of only 250–350 individuals.

The green field represents the lush vegetation of the island. The cross represents the Trinity and Christianity, with its three colours symbolising the natives, the fertile soil, and the pure water. The ten green five-pointed stars stand for the country's ten parishes: (St Andrew, St David, St George, St John, St Joseph, St Luke, St Mark, St Patrick, St Paul, and St Peter), while the red disc stands for justice.

The sisserou parrot is sometimes coloured either blue or purple (the parrot's actual colour). The use of purple makes the flag of Dominica one of the few flags of sovereign states to contain the colour.

The flag of Dominica, along with other national symbols, was the focus of a government-sponsored "Emblems Week" in 2016. An initiative of the independence committee, Emblems Week is aimed at reflecting on the meaning of the national emblems, and promoting their use among members of the general public and particularly among the country's schools.

== Historical designs ==
Flag	Date	Use
	1493–1500	Flag of Castile and León
	1500–16	
	1516–1627	Flag of Spain
	1627–35	Flag of England
	1635–60	Flag of France
	1715–63, 1778–84	
	1763–78, 1784–1801	The Union Jack
	1801–75	
	1875–1940	Flag of the British Leeward Islands
	1875–1940	Flag of the governor of Leeward Islands
	1940–53	Flag of the British Windward Islands
	1940–53	Flag of the governor-in-chief of the British Windward Islands
	1953–58	Flag of the British Windward Islands
	1953–58	Flag of the governor-in-chief of the British Windward Islands
	1955–65	
	1958–62	Flag of the West Indies Federation
	1965–78	
	1965–78	Flag of the governor of Dominica
	1978–81	Flag of Dominica
	1981–88	Flag of Dominica
	1988–90	Flag of Dominica
	1990–present	Flag of Dominica
