= Coat of arms of Nicaragua =

- Armiger: Republic of Nicaragua
- Adopted: 1971 (1823 - original version)

The coat of arms of Nicaragua was first adopted on August 21, 1823 as the coat of arms of Central America, but underwent several changes during the course of history, until the current version was introduced in 1971.

== Meaning ==
The triangle signifies equality, the rainbow signifies peace, the gorro frigio (Phrygian cap) symbolizes liberty and the five volcanoes express the union and brotherhood of all five Central American countries. Lastly the gold words surrounding the emblem: Republica De Nicaragua - America Central (English: Republic of Nicaragua - Central America).

== Gallery ==
Coat of Arms of the United Provinces of Central America (1823-1825)

Coat of Arms of the Federal Republic of Central America (1825-1842)

Coat of arms of the Greater Republic of Central America (1895-1898).

Coat of Arms of Nicaragua (1854)

Coat of Arms of Nicaragua (1880-1908)

Coat of Arms of Nicaragua (1908-1971)

Seal of Nicaraguan Police.

== See also ==
- Flag of Nicaragua
- Politics of Nicaragua
