= Foz do Jordão =

Coordinates: 9°23′S 71°56′W

- Municipality
- Flag Coat of arms
- Interactive map of Foz do Jordão
- Country: Brazil
- Region: Southern
- State: Paraná
- Mesoregion: Centro-Sul Paranaense

Population (2020)
  - Total: 4,556
- Time zone: UTC−3 (BRT)

Foz do Jordão is a municipality in the state of Paraná in the Southern Region of Brazil.

== See also ==
- List of municipalities in Paraná
