= San Pedro de Ceque =

Coordinates: 42°03′N 6°04′W

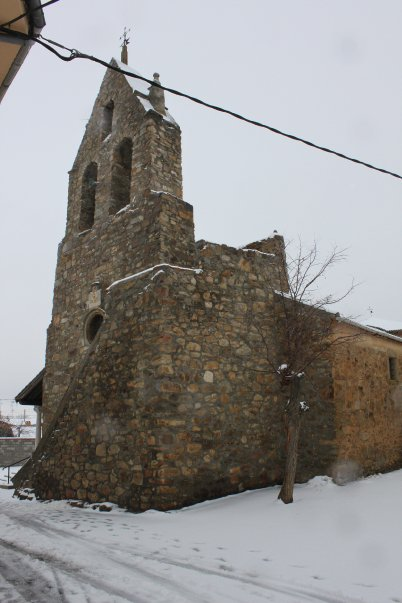

- Flag Coat of arms
- Interactive map of San Pedro de Ceque
- Country: Spain
- Autonomous community: Castile and León
- Province: Zamora
- Municipality: San Pedro de Ceque

Area
  - Total: 49 km^{2} (19 sq mi)

Population (2025-01-01)
  - Total: 417
  - Density: 8.5/km^{2} (22/sq mi)
- Time zone: UTC+1 (CET)
  - Summer (DST): UTC+2 (CEST)
- Climate: Csb
- Website: Official website

San Pedro de Ceque is a municipality located in the province of Zamora, Castile and León, Spain. According to the 2004 census (INE), the municipality has a population of 651 inhabitants.
