= Flag of Cusco =

Flag of the Peruvian city of Cusco

- Use: Civil flag
- Proportion: 4:7
- Adopted: 4 June 2021
- Use: Civil flag
- Adopted: 9 June 1978
- Relinquished: 4 June 2021
- Designed by: Raúla Montesinos Espejo

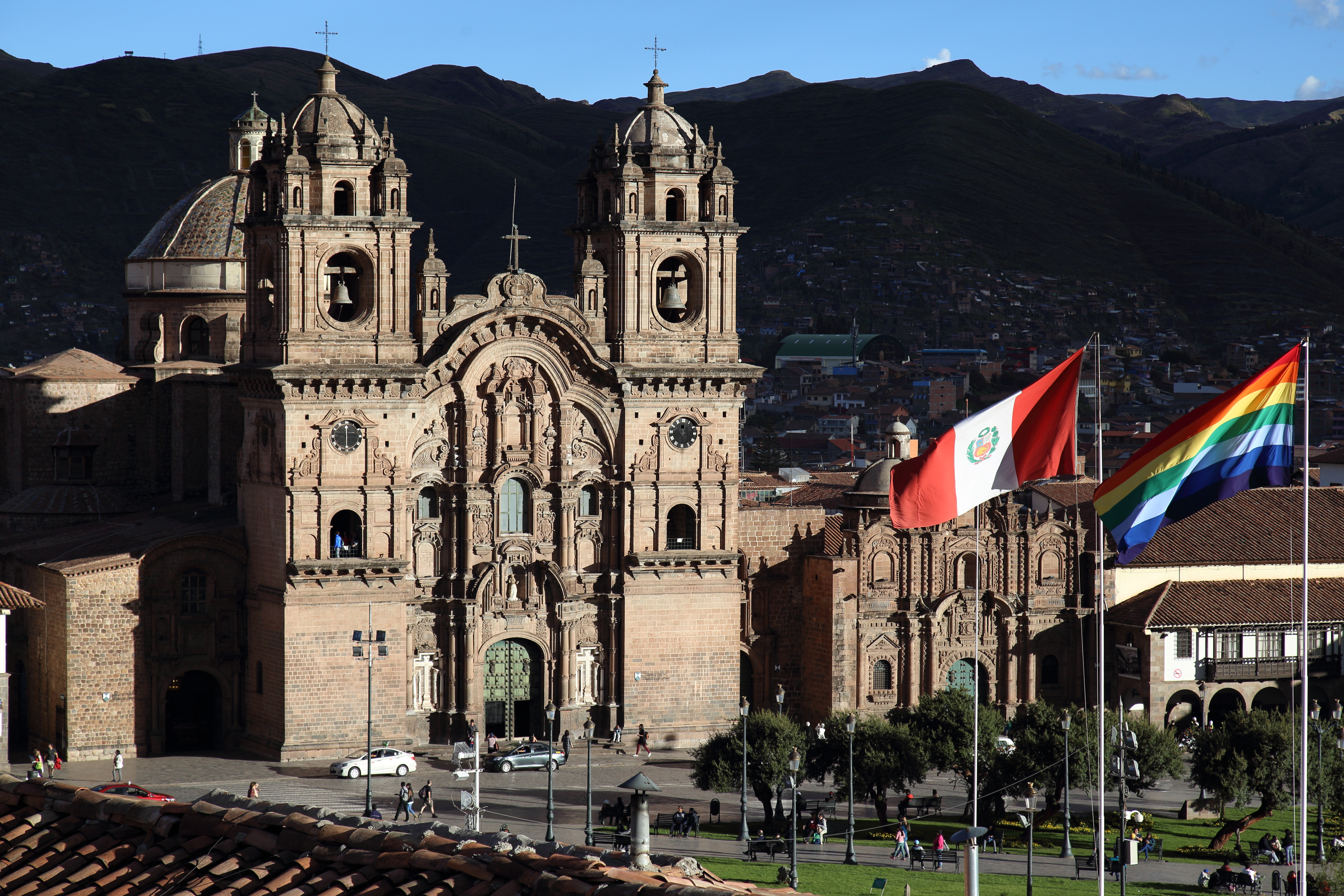
The flags of Peru and Cusco in the main square of the city.

The official flag of the Peruvian city of Cusco has seven horizontal stripes of color: red, orange, yellow, green, sky blue, blue, and violet. This rainbow flag was introduced to Peru in 1973 by Raúl Montesinos Espejo, in recognition of the 25th anniversary of his Tawantinsuyo Radio station. As the flag's popularity grew, Cusco mayor Gilberto Muñiz Caparó declared it an official emblem in 1978. Since 2021, the official flag has also featured the golden Sol de Echenique.

== Other meaning ==
In addition to being the city flag and a co-official flag of the Department of Cuzco, a seven-color flag has different uses depending on the context. It is used as the flag for Quechua languages, a popular (albeit unofficial) national flag of the Quechua people, and a flag representing the Inca heritage in general. Quechuans in South Bolivia (Kolla) used this flag, but in recent years the symbol of Chakana has become more popular in Bolivia. Its use as an Inca heritage flag is controversial due to its non-historic nature. Nevertheless, its use shows respect for the history of the Inca Empire.

== History ==
=== Origins and controversy ===
Banner of the Inca Empire

Chronicles of the conquest of Peru mention flags used by the Incas, or something that chroniclers interpreted as a flag. The question of the flag's historicity is closely related to the wiphala or Aymara flag. María Rostworowski in 2010 claimed no evidence that ancient cultures used such a flag, and the Congress of the Republic of Peru corroborated the conclusion of National Academy of Peruvian History: "The official use of the wrongly called 'Tawantinsuyu flag' is a mistake. In the Andean World there did not exist the concept of a flag, it did not belong to their historic context".

=== Modern history ===
Flag of Cusco (1821–1978)

The first recorded use of the rainbow flag in Peru was related to the Co-operative movement that entered the scene in the early 20th century. The modern flag was created in the early 1970s on the initiative of a local radio station Radio Rural. In 1973, on the occasion of the station's twenty-fifth anniversary, Raúla Montesinos Espejo proposed the rainbow flag, presenting it as belonging to the Incas. Unfortunately, Montesinos never submitted a study that proves the design's authenticity, and it was accepted de facto without further evidence. The flag has since grown in popularity, but people mistakenly associate it with Tahuantinsuyo. Five years later, on June 9, 1978, the Municipality of Cusco Province took the flag as official; 16 days before the gay pride flag first flew in San Francisco in the United States. It is the second flag of Cuzco. The first flag used earlier consisted of a scarlet background and a coat of arms dating back to Spanish times, given in 1540. Due to its resemblance to the much more recognizable LGBT flag, the Echenique's sun was added to the flag in 2021. It is a golden disk that was given to the Peruvian President José Rufino Echenique during his visit to Cusco in 1853 and official emblem of the department, province and city of Cuzco since 1986.
