= Flag of the Jewish Autonomous Oblast =

Russian regional flag

Jewish Autonomous Oblast
- Use: State flag
- Proportion: 2∶3
- Adopted: 27 November 1996; 29 years ago
- Design: A white field with seven thin horizontal stripes of red, orange, yellow, green, light blue, blue, and purple in the center, each separated from adjacent stripes by a thinner white stripe
- Designed by: Alexander Valyaev
- Use: State flag
- Proportion: 2:3
- Adopted: 31 July 1996
- Relinquished: 27 November 1996
- Design: A white field with seven thin horizontal stripes of red, orange, yellow, green, light blue, blue, and purple in the center

The flag of the Jewish Autonomous Oblast, (Note: Russian: Флаг Еврейской автономной области, romanized: Flag Yevreyskoy avtonomnoy oblasti) a federal subject of Russia in the Far East, is a white field with seven thin horizontal stripes of red, orange, yellow, green, light blue, blue, and purple in the center, each separated from adjacent stripes by a thinner white stripe. The current design was adopted on 27 November 1996; the oblast's first flag was adopted on 31 July 1996 and had a similar design, albeit with even thinner stripes and no white stripes in between.

The Heraldic Council of the President of the Russian Federation investigated and cleared the flag of violations of the Russian anti-LGBTQ law enacted in 2013. A local of the JAO had requested a review of the flag due to its similarity to the rainbow pride flag, the display of which is prohibited under the anti-LGBTQ law. Russian officials and the flag's designer, Alexander Valyaev, have defended the design, stating it is unrelated to LGBTQ pride.

== History ==
=== Adoption and initial design ===
The All-Russian Central Executive Committee of the Soviet Union transformed the Birobidzhan District of the Far Eastern Krai into the Jewish Autonomous Oblast (JAO) on 7 May 1934. However, the JAO did not receive its own flag until the passing of JAO law No. 18, On the State Symbols of the Jewish Autonomous Oblast, on 31 July 1996. The law describes the first flag of the JAO as a 2∶3 white field with a horizontal "seven-colour rainbow stripe" in the center, the width of which equals 1/10th of the flag's width (height). Alexander Valyaev designed the flag. Amendments to the law were promulgated on 27 November 1996, which included the addition to the flag of white stripes (whose width equals 1/120th of the flag's width) between each coloured stripe, as well as the specification of the colours and width of the coloured stripes (the width of each being equal to 1/40th of the flag's width). On 23 April 2008, a new law was enacted that replaced the existing 1996 law on state symbols, but no changes were made to the flag's design.

=== 2013 review under Russia's anti-LGBTQ law ===
On 30 June 2013, Russian president Vladimir Putin signed a federal law against "LGBTQ propaganda", which prohibited, among other things, the public display of LGBTQ symbols. This prompted a JAO local to request a review of the oblast's flag because of its similarity to the rainbow pride flag. An investigation was launched by the Heraldic Council of the President of the Russian Federation, whose chairman Georgy Vilinbakhov concluded that the JAO flag was unrelated to the rainbow pride flag and therefore complies with Russian law. Vilinbakhov also clarified in the signed statement of his decision that "not every rainbow image is associated with sexual orientation".

Valyaev similarly defended his work as a "divine symbol ... of joy, light, and hope", and argued that the rainbow pride flag does not depict a true rainbow because it omits the light blue stripe. Then-JAO governor Rostislav Goldshteyn also defended the flag in a December 2022 interview with RTVI. When asked if there was a risk in flying the flag due to the anti-LGBTQ law, Goldshteyn replied that the flag is a Biblical symbol based on an exchange between God and Moses, and that it should not be confused with the rainbow pride flag.

== Protocol ==
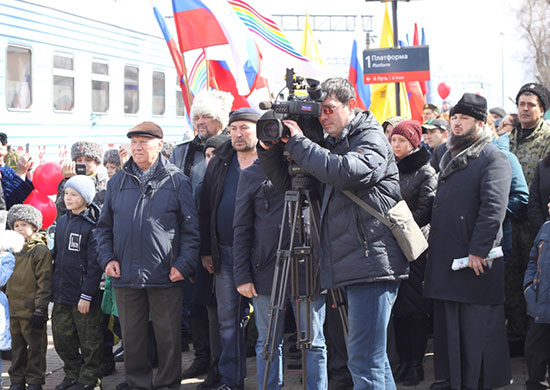
The JAO flag alongside the Russian flag at a military event in Birobidzhan

The 2008 law on state symbols requires the flag to be permanently raised on the buildings and in the meeting rooms of the legislative, executive, and electoral branches of the JAO government and its municipal governments. Other government institutions, such as the courts and the offices of the federal government, can freely display the flag, as can residential buildings during holidays and commemorative events. Non-state institutions can fly the flag with permission from the Legislative Assembly. However, only government institutions are permitted to reproduce the flag on documents, signs, and websites. Reproductions are required to match the design outlined in the 2008 law. During periods of mourning, the flag is lowered to half-mast and a black ribbon equal in length to the flag is attached to the top of the flagpole.

== Symbolism ==
There is no official explanation of the flag's symbolism in the 2008 law on state symbols. One interpretation is that white symbolises purity, while the rainbow symbolises goodness, happiness, and peace. The seven stripes of the rainbow have been variously interpreted as representing the seven candles of the Temple menorah, the seven days of the Genesis creation story, or the Seven Laws of Noah.

== See also ==
- Coat of arms of the Jewish Autonomous Oblast
- Rainbow flag, about rainbow flags in general
