= Flag of Nicaragua =

Nicaragua
- Use: National flag and ensign
- Proportion: 3∶5
- Adopted: September 5, 1908; 118 years ago August 27, 1971; 55 years ago (official)
- Design: Three horizontal stripes, the outer ones light blue and the central one white.
- Use: Civil and state flag
- Adopted: May 4, 1927; 99 years ago February 18, 2025; 21 months ago (official)

Detail of the coat of arms

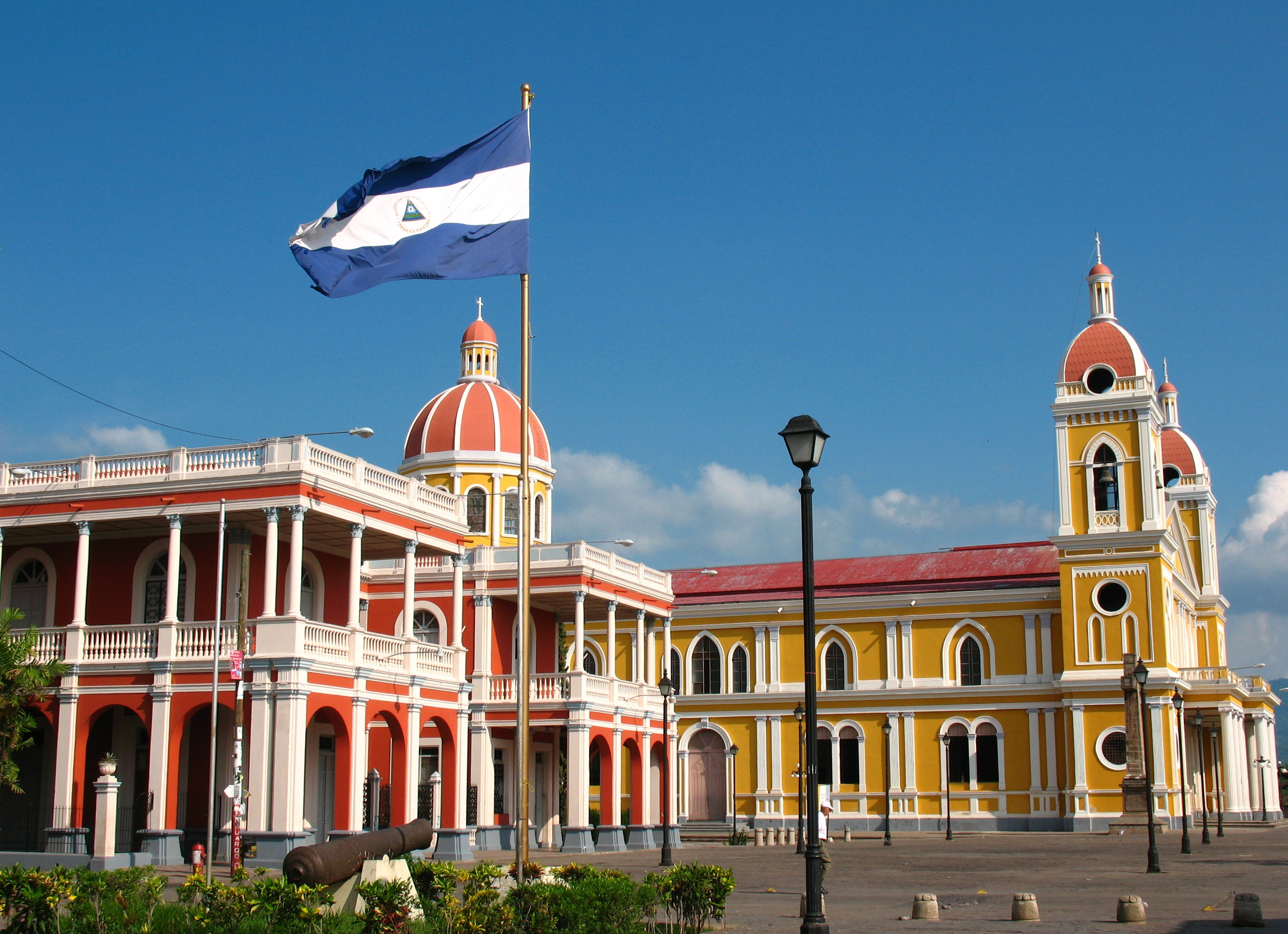
Flag at the Plaza de la Independencia, Granada, Nicaragua

The flag of Nicaragua was first adopted on September 11th, 1908, but not made official until August 27, 1971. It is based on, and inspired by, the flag of the Federal Republic of Central America, with a blue and white triband and a coat of arms as the charge in the centre. Its flag is one of the few that currently use the color purple, due to the rainbow in its coat of arms.

The flags of Guatemala, El Salvador, Honduras and Costa Rica are also based on the flag of the Federal Republic.

== Design ==
The two Azure bands on the flag and the arms of Nicaragua in use today is derived from that of the United Provinces of Central America. The triangle, volcanoes, rising sun, Cap of Liberty, and rainbow all appeared on the original emblem. The coat of arms used today contains the name of the state, Republica de Nicaragua, whereas in 1823 the title was Provincias Unidas del Centro de America. The decision to revert to the emblems used by the United Provinces of Central America was taken in 1908 and reflected Nicaragua's aspirations for the rebirth of the political entity formed by the 5 nations. Except for the text around the arms, the flag is very similar to that of the United Provinces of Central America. The 5 volcanoes represent the original 5 member states, the Cap of Liberty represents national freedom, and the rays of the sun and the rainbow are symbolic of the bright future to come.

The presence of a rainbow in the coat of arms makes the flag of Nicaragua one of only a handful flags of a sovereign state to include the color purple.

=== Colours ===
Flag

| Scheme | Azure | White |
| Refs | | |
|---|---|---|
| Pantone (paper) | 281C | Safe |
| HEX | #00205b | #FFFFFF |
| CMYK | 100, 65, 0, 64 | 0, 0, 0, 0 |
| RGB | 0, 32, 92 | 255, 255, 255 |

Coat of Arms

| Scheme | Gold | Light blue | Yellow | Green | Grey | Black |
| Refs | | | | | | |
|---|---|---|---|---|---|---|
| Pantone (paper) | 125C | 292C | 109U | 355C | 277C | Black |
| HEX | #b58500 | #69B3E7 | #ffc700 | #009639 | #abcae9 | #000000 |
| CMYK | 0, 27, 100, 29 | 55, 23, 0, 9 | 0, 22, 100, 0 | 100, 0, 62, 41 | 27, 13, 0, 9 | 0, 0, 0, 100 |
| RGB | 181, 132, 0 | 105, 179, 231 | 255, 199, 0 | 0, 150, 57 | 169, 202, 232 | 0, 0, 0 |

== History ==
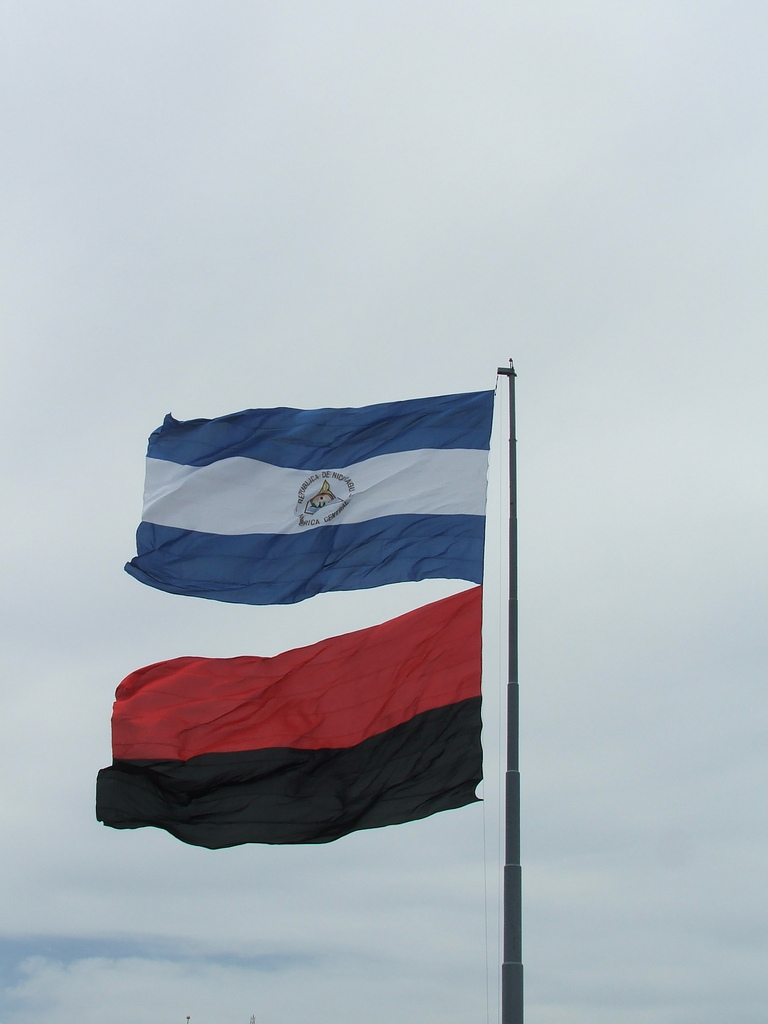
Flag of Nicaragua and the FSLN flown together

The flag of the Federal Republic of Central America, which had newly become independent, was adopted on August 21, 1823, and consisted of a blue and white triband with the national coat of arms in the centre, just like on the modern Nicaraguan flag. However, the coat of arms differed as did the shade of blue, being lighter than the modern Azure used. This coat of arms, however, had many of the elements of the current Nicaraguan coat of arms, including a rainbow over mountains and a Phrygian cap. When the republic collapsed and each of the constituent countries became independent, Nicaragua continued to use the flag until 1854. They replaced the flag with a yellow-white and scarlet tricolour. While a part of the Greater Republic of Central America, they once again used a similar flag to the United Provinces, with blue and white with a coat of arms in the middle.

Beginning in 1908, they once again flew the United Provinces flag – each former country had differentiated in a way unique to their country, e.g. the 5 stars on the Flag of Honduras, or the red stripe in the middle on the Flag of Costa Rica. The Sandinistas had their own flag that they used during the movement which basically functioned as a secondary flag of Nicaragua.

On 30 January 2025, the National Assembly officially amended the Constitution of Nicaragua to include the flag of the Sandinista National Liberation Front as one of the country's national symbols.

== Historical flags ==
New Spain until 1785

Captaincy General of Guatemala (1785–1821)

First Mexican Empire
(1823–1824)

United Provinces of Central America
(1823–1824)

Federal Republic of Central America
(1824–1838)

(1838–1854)

(1854–1856)

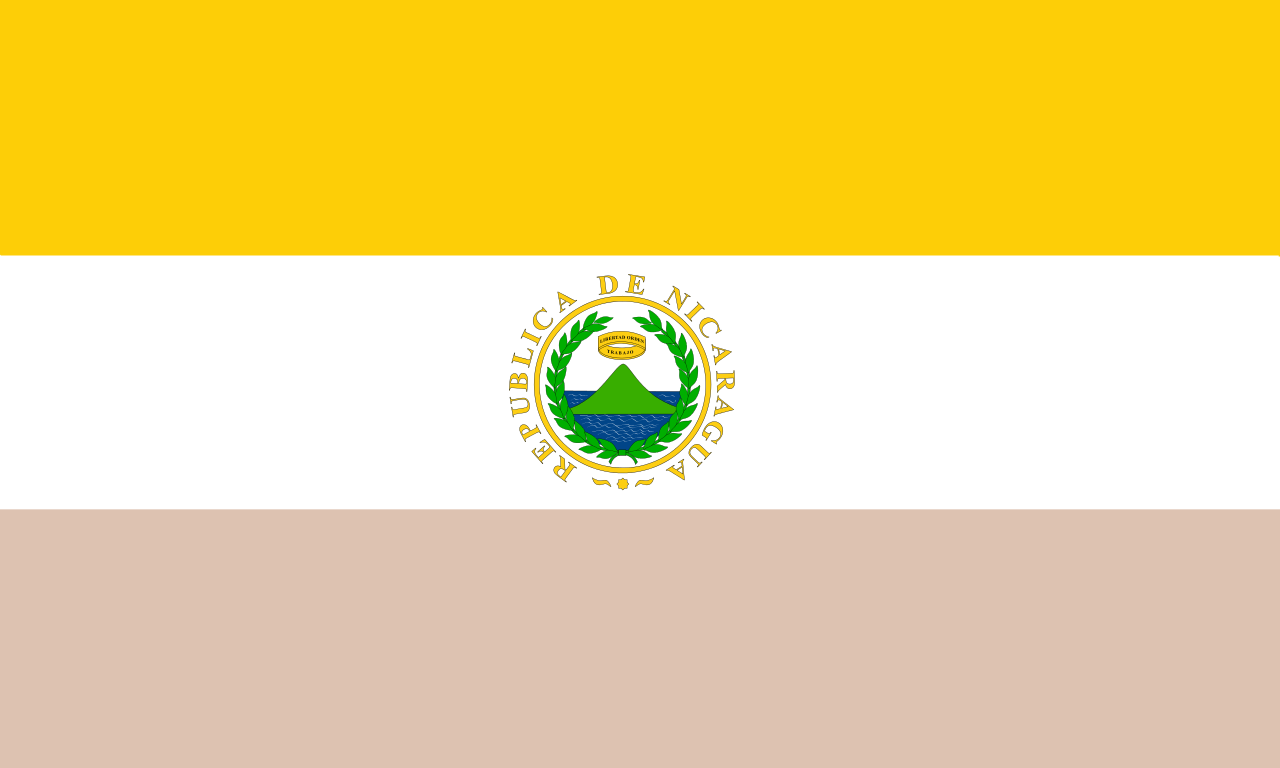
State flag
(1854–1856)

Merchant Navy flag
(1854–1856)

William Walker's Nicaragua flag
(1855–1857)

(1858–1889)

(1889–1893)

(1893–1896)

(1896–1908)

Greater Republic of Central America
(November 1898)

(1908–1971)

United States occupation of Nicaragua
(1912–1933)

== See also ==
- List of Nicaraguan flags
- Coat of arms of Nicaragua
- Flag of El Salvador
- Flag of Guatemala
- Flag of Honduras
- Flag of the Internal Macedonian Revolutionary Organization, which is nearly identical to the Rojinegra
- Flag of the Ukrainian Insurgent Army, which is nearly identical to the Rojinegra
