= Wiphala =

Flag representing native people in South America

- Use: National flag
- Proportion: 1:1
- Adopted: August 5, 2009
- Design: 7x7 square patchwork of seven colors

The Wiphala (Quechua pronunciation: [wɪˈpʰala], Spanish: [(ɡ)wi.ˈpa.la]) is a square emblem commonly used nowadays as a flag to represent the native peoples of the Andes that include Bolivia, Peru, Chile, Ecuador, northwestern Argentina, and southern Colombia. Although the Wiphala as a symbol is controversial because it is an invented rather than pre-Columbian tradition, the 2009 Bolivian constitution recognized the Qullasuyu Wiphala as the second national flag.

Statue of Silvia Lazarte holding a Wiphala flag

== History ==
=== Discussion of its origin ===
Despite its recognition as a national symbol of Bolivia in the 2009 Constitution, the Wiphala has been the subject of intense debate and controversy in the country, primarily regarding its origin, representation, and association with political movements.

The origin of the Wiphala has generated discussion among historians and researchers. While some point to the existence of similar colored square patterns in textiles and ceramics from the Tiwanaku culture, other experts debate whether this symbol, in its current form as a flag, existed in pre-European colonial times. Historians such as María Rostworowski have argued that the Incas did not have this flag and that no chronicler made reference to it, even stating: "I give you my life, the Incas did not have that flag. That flag did not exist, no chronicler makes reference to it." The position of other experts is that the Wiphala is an "invented tradition." Dissenting voices claim that the Wiphala is a historical fraud and that it was never truly used in pre-Columbian times. It has been suggested that the Wiphala is actually a 19th-century invention or a modern reconstruction from the 1970s and 1980s within its own ideological framework.

=== Pre-Columbian era ===
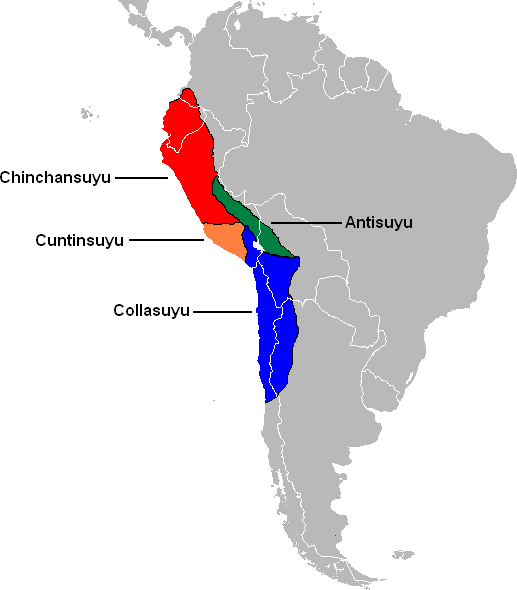
Each suyu of the Inca Empire has its own corresponding variant coloration of the Wiphala

The oldest surviving example of a wiphala-type design corresponds to a chuspa or bag for coca corresponding to the Tiwanaku culture (1580 BC – AD 1187). The chuspa is currently in the Brooklyn Museum, and its use of wiphala design is mixed with several others, so it is not possible to establish its meaning or use within the Andean cosmogony of the time.

The Museum of World Culture in Gothenburg, Sweden, holds a Wiphala that is estimated to have been created in the 11th century according to radiocarbon dating. It originates from the Tiwanaku region, and is part of a collection based on a kallawaya medicine man's grave.

==== Tawantinsuyu ====
Anti Suyu

Chinchay Suyu

Qulla Suyu

Kunti Suyu

Attributed regional (suyu) wiphalas are composed of a 7 × 7 square patchwork in seven colors, arranged diagonally. The precise configuration varies based on the particular suyu represented by the emblem. The color of the longest diagonal line (seven squares) corresponds to one of four regions the flag represents: white for Qullasuyu, yellow for Kuntisuyu, red for Chinchaysuyu, and green for Antisuyu.

=== Colonial era ===
Painting by the Master of Calamarca

Anonymous painting

There are two depictions of angels done in the style of the Cuzco School with flags. The first is an 18th-century painting located in a church in Calamarca. It depicts the angel Gabriel as an arquebusier carrying a chessboard standard. The painting was probably painted by the Master of Calamarca. The second is an untitled painting from the 17th or 18th century. A colored checkerboard flag is also found on the tower painted in the 1716 painting "The Entry of the Viceroy Archbishop Morcillo into Potosí", which is now in the Museum of the Americas in Madrid. Indigenous rebel Túpac Katari is sometimes associated with other variants.

=== Post-colonial era ===
The earliest description of the wiphala in independent Bolivia comes from the French naturalist Alcide d'Orbigny, who saw it in 1830 during the San Pedro celebrations in La Paz, an area inhabited mainly by the Aymara people.

There were also three pages as an accompaniment, adorned with a large baldric hanging from their necks, and two of them carried standards bearing a flag with white, yellow, red, blue, and green checks.

Despite its official status in Bolivia, the Wiphala is not a symbol with which the entire Bolivian population identifies. Its use and meaning have generated deep polarization, especially during the 2019 political crisis. In this context, the Wiphala became an emblem of division; supporters defended it as a symbol of indigenous identity, while detractors associated it with a specific political party.

This association, particularly with the Movement Towards Socialism (MAS) party, has led some groups to consider it a partisan symbol rather than a national one. Consequently, opponents of the flag have publicly rejected the Wiphala, even labeling it a "symbol of hatred," which in turn led to complaints from the central government and MAS supporters.

== Colors and their meaning ==
The seven colors of the actual Wiphala reflect those of the rainbow. According to the Katarista movement (whose interpretation is promoted by the Bolivian authorities), the significance and meaning for each color are as follows:

- Red: The Earth and the Andean being
- Orange: Society and culture
- Yellow: Energy and strength
- White: Time and change
- Green: Natural resources and wealth
- Blue: The Cosmos
- Violet: Andean government and self-determination

=== Color scheme ===
Color scheme	Red	Orange	Yellow	White	Green	Blue	Violet
CMYK	0-95-91-14	0-49-97-7	0-12-99-1	0-0-0-0	99-0-68-46	97-61-0-31	0-66-15-54
HEX	#db0a13	#ec7808	#fcde02	#ffffff	#018a2c	#0645b1	#752864
RGB	219-10-19	236-120-8	252-222-2	255-255-255	1-138-44	6-69-177	117-40-100

== Andean peoples and social movements ==
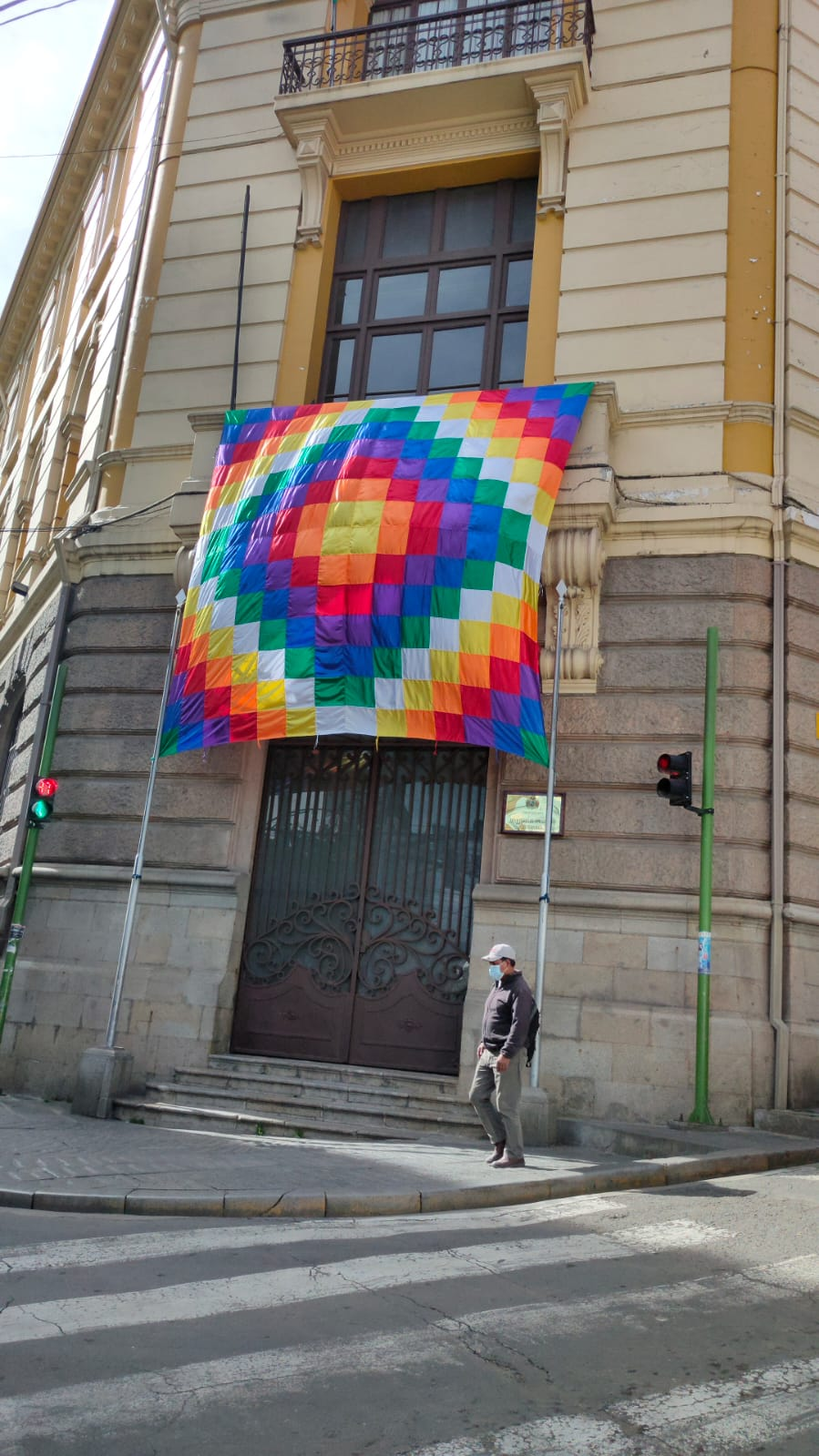
A variant of the Wiphala in the shape of a Chakana hoisted at the Ministry of Foreign Affairs in La Paz, Bolivia.

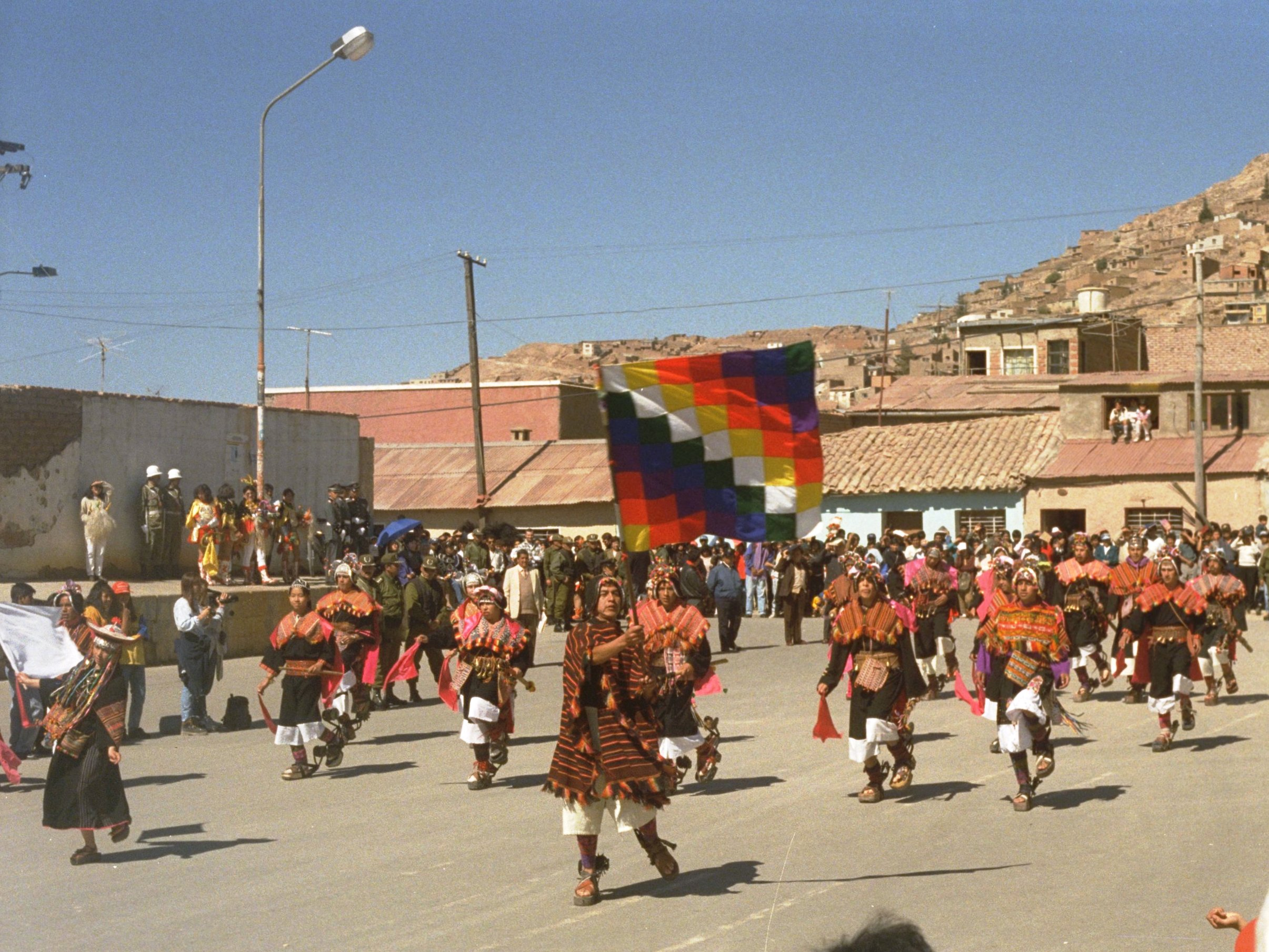
Aymara parade in Oruro, Bolivia, with the official Wiphala.

=== The Bolivian Wiphala ===
The Aymara wiphala is a square flag divided into 7 × 7 (49) squares. The seven rainbow colors are placed in diagonal squares. The exact arrangement and colors varies with the different versions, corresponding to the suyus or Tupac Katari. It is very prominent in marches of indigenous and peasant movements in Bolivia.

This "rainbow squares" flag is used as the pan-indigenous flag of Andean peoples in Bolivia and has recently occasionally been adopted by Amazonian groups in political alliance.

Bolivian president Evo Morales established the Qullasuyu wiphala as the nation's dual flag, along with the previous red, yellow, and green banner in the newly ratified constitution. The Wiphala has been included into the national colors of the Bolivian Air Force such as the executive jet (currently a Dassault Falcon 900EX). The Wiphala is also officially flown on governmental buildings such as the Palacio Quemado and parliament alongside the tricolor since the introduction of the revised 2009 constitution.

During the 2019 Bolivian political crisis, videos emerged of Bolivian police cutting the wiphala off of their uniforms. It was also removed from some government buildings and burned by protesters, who chanted "Bolivia belongs to Christ!" This was later condemned by the acting president, Jeanine Áñez as a destruction of indigenous heritage.

=== Social movements in Ecuador ===
In modern Ecuador, the Wiphala is identified with the Indigenous social movement mainly represented by CONAIE (Confederation of Indigenous Nationalities of Ecuador). This organization has had an important role in massive protests in the late 1990s and 2000s. The flag of CONAIE is a wiphala with a mask in the middle from a pre-Inca Ecuadorian coastal peoples known as La Tolita.

The flag is displayed by marches of the CONAIE movement and also it is used by its political faction, the Movimiento de Unidad Plurinacional Pachakutik - Nuevo País (a Pachakutik-inspired Movement), which participates in elections and has a considerable legislative representation. Pachakutik is a Quechua word related with the vision and the hope of a better future for the Andean people. The MUPP was formed in the 1990s mainly by an alliance of the CONAIE with peasant organizations and urban social movements. It also finds sympathy in local LGBT, feminist and Afro-Ecuadorian circles and activists.

=== Confusion with flag of Cusco ===
Current flag of the city of Cusco

The Wiphala has been confused with the seven-striped rainbow design flag, the current official banner of the Peruvian city of Cusco, where it is commonly displayed in government buildings and in the main square. This rainbow flag is sometimes displayed as a symbol of the Inca Empire (Tawantinsuyu), although Peruvian historiographers and the Peruvian Congress have stated that the empire never had a flag. While the wiphala is an emblem related principally to the Aymara people, the Inca had their origins with the Quechua people.

=== Others ===
Tupac Katari

Tupac Katari (alternate)

== See also ==
- List of national flags of sovereign states
- Rainbow flag
