= List of Canadian flags =

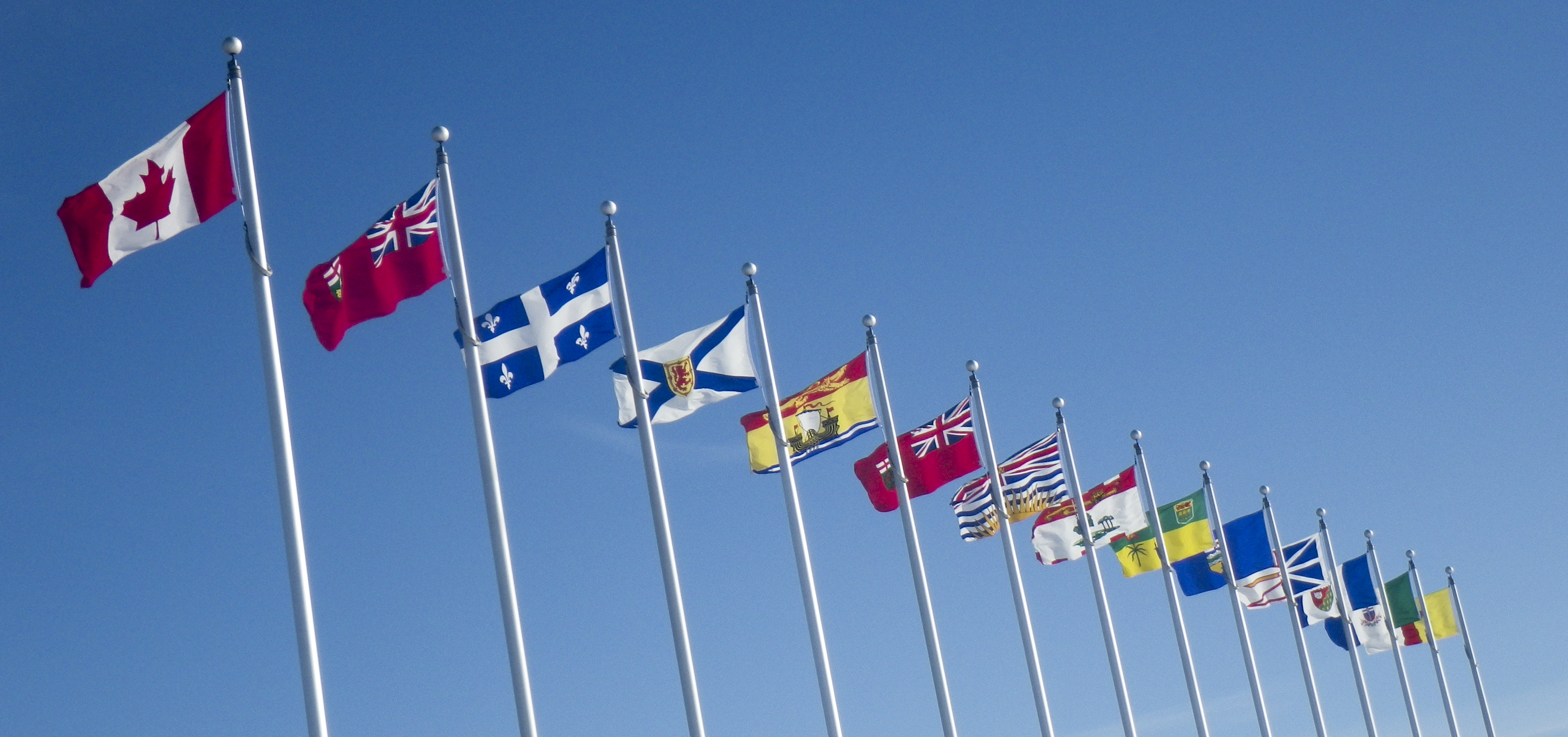
The national flag of Canada (at left) being flown with the flags of the 10 provinces and 3 territories

The Department of Canadian Heritage lays out protocol guidelines for the display of flags, including an order of precedence; these instructions are only conventional, however, and are generally intended to show respect for what are considered important symbols of the state or institutions. The Sovereign's Flag for Canada is supreme in the order of precedence, followed by those for the monarch's representatives (depending on jurisdiction), the personal flags of other members of the Royal Family, and then the national flag and provincial flags.

Many museums across Canada display historic flags in their exhibits. The Canadian Museum of History in Hull, Quebec, has many culturally important flags in their collections. Settlers, Rails & Trails in Argyle, Manitoba, holds the second largest exhibit, known as the Canadian Flag Collection.

== National and provincial flags ==
=== National ===
Flag	Date	Use	Description
	1965–present	National flag of Canada (The Maple Leaf, l'Unifolié)	A vertical bicolour triband of red, white, red with a red maple leaf emblem charged in the Canadian pale

=== Provincial ===
Flag	Date	Use	Description
	1965–present	Flag of Ontario	A Red Ensign (red field with the Royal Union Flag in the canton) defaced with the shield of the coat of arms of Ontario in the fly
	1948–present	Flag of Quebec (The Fleurdelisé)	A blue field with an ordinary white cross and a white fleur-de-lis in each quadrant
	1858 (first use); 1929 (arms adopted); 2013 (flag adopted) – present	Flag of Nova Scotia	A banner of arms of the coat of arms of Nova Scotia
	1965–present	Flag of New Brunswick	A banner of the coat of arms of New Brunswick
	1965–present	Flag of Manitoba	A Red Ensign (red field with the Royal Union Flag in the canton) defaced with the shield of the coat of arms of Manitoba in the fly
	1960–present	Flag of British Columbia	A banner of the coat of arms of British Columbia
	1964–present	Flag of Prince Edward Island	A banner of the coat of arms of Prince Edward Island within a bordure compony of red and white
	1969–present	Flag of Saskatchewan	A horizontal bicolour, green and yellow, with the shield of the coat of arms of Saskatchewan in the canton and western red lily emblem charged in the fly
	1968–present	Flag of Alberta	A blue field with the shield of the coat of arms of Alberta charged in the centre
	1980–present	Flag of Newfoundland and Labrador	A blue and white field party per pale (at nombril point) with a white border, white ordinary cross and white saltire, two triangular divisions in the fly lined in red, a golden arrow between two triangular divisions

=== Territorial ===
Flag	Date	Use	Description
	1969–present	Flag of the Northwest Territories	A vertical bicolour triband of blue, white, blue with the shield of the coat of arms of the Northwest Territories charged in the Canadian pale
	1968–present	Flag of Yukon	A vertical tricolour of green, white, blue with the shield of the coat of arms of Yukon above a wreath of fireweed charged in the pale, with pale ratio of 1 to 1.5 to 1
	1999–present	Flag of Nunavut	A field party per pale, yellow and white, with a red inukshuk charged in the centre and a blue star in the upper fly

=== Ceremonial ===
Flag	Date	Use	Description
	1965–present	Royal Union Flag	The Cross of St. Andrew counterchanged with the Cross of St. Patrick and over all the Cross of St. George.

== Royal ==
Flag	Date	Use	Description
	2023–present	Sovereign's Flag for Canada	A banner of the royal arms of Canada undifferentiated
	2011–present	Personal flag of the Prince of Wales for use in Canada	A banner of the royal arms of Canada differentiated by a white three-pointed label and defaced with the Prince of Wales's feathers
	2013–present	Personal flag of the Princess Royal for use in Canada	A banner of the royal arms of Canada differentiated by a white three-pointed label; the first and third labels bearing a red cross, the centre label bearing a red heart; and defaced with a royal cypher of Princess Anne
	2014–present	Personal flag of the Duke of Edinburgh for use in Canada	A banner of the royal arms of Canada differentiated by a three-pointed label; the centre label bearing a Tudor rose; and defaced with a royal cypher of Prince Edward, Duke of Edinburgh
	2015–present	Other members of the royal family	A banner of the royal arms of Canada with a border of ermine

== Viceregal and administrative ==
=== Governor general ===
Flag	Date	Use	Description
	1981–present	Flag of the governor general of Canada	A blue field with the crest of the royal arms of Canada charged in the centre. The tongue and claws were removed from 1999 to 2002.
	1994–present	Banner of arms of the Canadian Heraldic Authority	A square white field with the red maple leaf of Canada differenced by a white inescutcheon charged in the centre

== Supreme Court of Canada ==
Flag	Date	Use	Description
	2021–present	Flag of the Supreme Court of Canada	Gules on a Canadian pale Argent a lozenge lozengy of the first and the second charged with maple leaves alternately Or and of the field

== Military and civilian law enforcement organizations ==
=== Canadian Armed Forces ===
Flag	Date	Use	Description
	1968–present	Flag of the Canadian Armed Forces	A white field with the National Flag of Canada in the canton and the Canadian Armed Forces badge charged in the fly
	1920–present	Flag of the Royal Military College of Canada	A vertical triband of red, white, and red with the badge of the Royal Military College of Canada charged in the centre
Royal Military College Saint-Jean	1920–present	Flag of the Royal Military College Saint-Jean	A vertical triband of blue, white, and blue with the badge of the Royal Military College Saint-Jean charged in the centre
	2000–present	Banner of the Commander-in-Chief Unit Commendation	A vertical tricolour of blue, red, and azure, with the crest of the royal arms of Canada charged in the centre
	2009–present	Camp flag of the Cadet Instructors Cadre	The badge of the Cadet Instructors Cadre, with the traditional colours of the Navy, Army and the Air Force. The golden border represents the young people that CIC officers work for.
	−1965	King's Colour, as used by the Royal Military College of Canada	King's Colour of the Royal Military College of Canada with the Union Flag.

==== Canadian Army ====
Flag	Date	Use	Description
	1939–1944	Old flag of the Canadian Army	
	1968–1998	Old flag of the Canadian Army	
	1998–2013	Old flag of the Canadian Army	
	2013–2016	Old flag of the Canadian Army	
	2016–present	Flag of the Canadian Army	A scarlet red field with the national flag of Canada in the canton and the Canadian Army badge charged in the fly
	–present	Flag of the Commander of the Canadian Army	

==== Royal Canadian Navy ====
Flag	Date	Use	Description
	1968–present	Canadian Naval Ensign (2013–present), naval jack (1968–2013)	A white field with the national flag of Canada in the canton and charged in the fly with an anchor, eagle, and naval crown in blue
	1979–present	Canadian Forces Auxiliary Jack	A blue field with the national flag of Canada in the canton and charged in the fly with an anchor, eagle, and naval crown in white
	c. 1964–present	Flag of the Canadian Navy Board	A field party per bend, blue and sanguine, with a fouled anchor in gold charged in the centre
	RCN (1911–1965); RCSCC (1905–1965)	Used as the ensign of the Royal Canadian Navy and some Royal Canadian Sea Cadets corps. Used throughout the entire British Empire by the Royal Navy and by several former British colonies even after they became independent and established their own navies.	White Ensign, St George's Cross with the Union Flag in the canton.
	RCN (1957–1965)	The Blue Ensign, worn as a jack by the Royal Canadian Navy	Blue Ensign defaced with the royal arms of Canada. The maple leaves at the bottom of the shield are red.
	RCN (1921–1957); RCSCC (1929–1953)	The Blue Ensign, worn as a jack by the Royal Canadian Navy and used by the RCSCC	Blue Ensign defaced with the royal arms of Canada. The maple leaves at the bottom of the shield are green.
	Naval Service of Canada / Royal Canadian Navy (1910–1911, as ensign; 1911–1921 as jack); RCSCC (1910–1922)	The Blue Ensign, worn as ensign then jack by the Naval Service of Canada/Royal Canadian Navy	Blue Ensign defaced with the 1868 Great Seal of Canada. Worn as ensign from 1910 to 1913, then jack from 1913 to 1921, after Navy authorized to fly the British White Ensign.

==== Royal Canadian Air Force ====
Flag	Date	Use	Description
	1921–1940	Royal Canadian Air Force Ensign	A field of air force blue with the Union Flag in the canton and the Royal Air Force roundel charged in the fly
	1941–1968	Royal Canadian Air Force Ensign	A field of air force blue with the Union Flag in the canton and the Royal Canadian Air Force roundel charged in the fly
	1982–present	Royal Canadian Air Force Ensign	A field of air force blue with the national flag of Canada in the canton and the Royal Canadian Air Force roundel charged in the fly

==== Canadian Special Operations Forces Command ====
Flag	Date	Use	Description
Link to file	–present	Flag of the Canadian Special Operations Forces Command	A white field with the national flag of Canada in the canton and the CANSOFCOM badge charged in the fly

=== Canada Border Services Agency ===
Flag	Date	Use	Description
	2012–present	Flag of the Canada Border Services Agency	A blue field with the national flag of Canada in the canton and the Canada Border Services Agency badge charged in the fly

=== Canadian Coast Guard ===
Flag	Date	Use	Description
	1965–present	Jack of the Canadian Coast Guard	A banner of the arms of the Canadian Coast Guard: a white field with blue flank/side one third length of flag at the fly; field charged with a red maple leaf emblem and side at fly charged with a pair of heraldic dolphins in gold, one above the other and facing opposite directions. (Note: The official blazon of the jack reads: "Argent senestré Azure on the Argent a maple leaf Gules on the Azure two dolphins naiant Or the lower one contourné.") Features current eleven-point maple leaf designed by Jacques St-Cyr.
	1962–1965	Jack of the Canadian Coast Guard, original design	A white field with blue flank/side one third length of flag at the fly; field charged with a red maple leaf emblem and side at fly charged with a pair of heraldic dolphins in gold, one above the other and facing opposite directions. Features original thirteen-point maple leaf designed by Alan Beddoe.
	1962–1965	Ensign of the Canadian Coast Guard	Blue Ensign of Canadian Government Ships, defaced with Coat of Arms of Canada
	–present	Honorary Commissioner Flag	Governor General's flag in the canton.

=== Police services ===
Flag	Date	Use	Description
	1991–present	Ensign of the Royal Canadian Mounted Police	A red field with a blue canton bordered yellow with a representation of the Badge of the RCMP.
Link to file	1998–present	Flag of the Ontario Provincial Police	Blue with the heraldic badge of the OPP.
	1983–present	Flag of the Sûreté du Québec	A vertical triband of green, yellow, and green, with the badge of the Sûreté du Québec on the yellow Canadian Pale.
	–present	Flag of the Royal Newfoundland Constabulary	A blue field with the badge of the RNC in the centre.

=== Youth cadets organizations ===
Flag	Date	Use	Description
	1953–1976	Former flag of the Royal Canadian Sea Cadets	A white flag with a Union Flag at the canton, with the badge of the Royal Canadian Sea Cadets at the fly. This is the basis of the current flag of the Royal Canadian Sea Cadets.
	1976–present	Flag of the Royal Canadian Sea Cadets	A white flag with a Canadian flag at the canton, with the badge of the Royal Canadian Sea Cadets at the fly.
	2009–present	Flag of the Navy League of Canada	A white flag with a Canadian flag at the canton, with the current badge of the Navy League of Canada at the fly.
	1985–present	Banner of the Royal Canadian Army Cadets	A Canadian flag in the same shape as a queen's colour used in the Canadian Armed Forces, with the maple leaf modified with the badge of the Royal Canadian Army Cadets. At the canton, the cypher of Prince Philip, Duke of Edinburgh, as former colonel-in-chief of the Royal Canadian Army Cadets. At the fly, a badge representing the Canadian Army (the crown of Saint Edward above crossed swords).
	1944–1973	Flag of the Royal Canadian Army Cadets used by individual Army Cadet Corps used before 1973	
	January 1973–present	Flag of the Royal Canadian Army Cadets used by individual Army Cadet Corps	
		Camp Flag of the Royal Canadian Army Cadets	On a white field, the badge of the Royal Canadian Army Cadets in the centre.
	1995–present	Flag of the Army Cadet League of Canada	A banner of the shield of the arms of the Army Cadet League of Canada. According to the heraldic grant, the shield of the arms of the Army Cadet League of Canada is "Argent two swords in saltire Argent fimbriated Gules hilted and pommelled Or surmounted by a maple leaf Gules veined Or all within an orle of twelve maple leaves stems inward Gules." The web site of the Governor General of Canada explains this description as follows: "The white shield, bearing a maple leaf and crossed broad swords, alludes to a central Canadian entity with direct connection to the military. The twelve smaller maple leaves show singleness of purpose but at the Branch level.
	1991–present	Banner of the Royal Canadian Air Cadets	Based on the design of Queen's Colour for the Royal Canadian Air Force, with the badge of the Royal Canadian Air Cadets replacing the maple leaf. At the canton, the cypher of Prince Philip, Duke of Edinburgh, as former air commodore in chief of the Royal Canadian Air Cadets. On the bottom fly, the first badge of the Royal Canadian Air Cadets, a golden maple leaf above an eagle.
	1971–present	Ensign of the Royal Canadian Air Cadets	An Air Force blue flag, with a Canadian flag at the canton, with the historical badge of the Royal Canadian Air Cadets.
		Squadron Banner of the Royal Canadian Air Cadets	An Air Force blue flag, with the badge of the Royal Canadian Air Cadets and a scroll stating the squadron's name and number (this example, 643 St-Hubert Squadron.
		Camp flag of the Junior Canadian Rangers	A 1/3 red and 2/3 green flag with the badge of the Junior Canadian Rangers on the fly.

== Civil ==
Flag	Date	Use	Description
	1922–1923	Canadian Civil Aviation Ensign, briefly used by the Air Board	A field of light blue with the Union Flag in the canton and a shield with white albatross superimposed upon three maple leaves in the middle of the fly.

== Corporations ==
=== Crown corporations ===
Flag	Date	Use	Description
	1992–present	Flag of the Canadian Broadcasting Corporation	A blue field with the logo of the Canadian Broadcasting Corporation charged in the centre and a red band along the bottom edge; logo was first introduced in 1992.
	1978–present	Flag of the Royal Canadian Mint	A red field with the logo of the Royal Canadian Mint charged in the centre; logo was first introduced in 1978.

== Civic organizations ==
Flag	Date	Use	Description
	1934	Flag of the Société nationale Jacques Cartier	A white field with a royal blue symmetric cross cantoned with four green maple leaves and charged with a golden fleur-de-lis, all enclosed with a dark crimson border. Designed by Maurice Brodeur for the 400th anniversary of Cartier's claiming of Canada for France.
	1943–present	Flag of the 4-H Clubs of Quebec	A gold field charged with a dark green maple leaf voided by a gold disc inscribed with the numeral '4' and letter 'H' in dark green, all enclosed with a dark green border. Designed by Maurice Brodeur.
	–present	Flag of the Canadian Flag Society	A white field charged with the red maple leaf of Canada, surrounded by a red border, all party per pale, counter-changed.

== Religious ==
Flag	Date	Use	Description
	1955–present	Flag of the Anglican Church of Canada	
	–present	Flag of the Grand Orange Lodge of Canada	

== Ethnic groups ==
=== Francophone peoples ===
Flag	Date	Use	Description
	1884–present	Acadian flag	Tri-coloured flag, blue, white, then red. A yellow star representing independence and unique culture from main land France.
	1975–present	Flag of the Franco-Ontarians	A bicolour flag, green and white, with a white fleur-de-lys charged in the hoist and a green trillium emblem charged in the fly.
	1976–present	Flag of the Fransaskois	A yellow field with a green Nordic cross centred towards the upper hoist and a red fleur-de-lis charged in the lower fly.
	1980–present	Flag of the Franco-Manitobans	A white field with yellow over sanguine bars with a green plant emblem in four pieces charged in the hoist.
	1981–present	Flag of the Franco-Columbians	A white field party per pale by a bar gemelles and dancetty, a fleur-de-lys and Pacific dogwood emblem charged in the fly; dogwood is the floral emblem of British Columbia, the blue stripes evoke the Pacific Ocean and the rising mountains beside, the yellow centre of the dogwood flower represents the sun.
	1982–present	Flag of the Franco-Albertans	A field party per bend sinister, blue and white, by a bend cotised white and blue with a white fleur-de-lys in the upper hoist and a red wild rose in the lower fly.
	1985–present	Flag of the Franco-Yukonnais	A blue field and three diagonal stripes set from lower hoist to upper fly. The colours of the stripes are white and golden yellow. The effect created by the arrangement of the stripes is meant to represent Yukon's many mountains. Blue is for the French people and the sky. White is for winter and snow. Yellow represents the gold rush and the Franco-Yukonnais contributions to history of the territory.
	1986–present	Flag of the Fédération des Francophones de Terre-Neuve et du Labrador (Franco-Terreneuviens)	Three unequal panels of blue, white, and red, with two yellow sails set on the line between the white and red panels. The sail on top is charged with a spruce twig, while the bottom sail is charged with a pitcher flower.
	1992–present	Flag of the Franco-Ténois	A polar bear on a snowy hill, looking forward towards a snowflake/Fleur-de-lis combined, representing the French community of the Northwest Territories of Canada.
	2002–present	Flag of the Franco-Nunavois	Blue that represents the Arctic sky and white recalls the snow, abundantly present on the territory. The principal shape represent an igloo, and under this one, the inukshuk which symbolise the human presence. A single dandelion flower grows from beneath it.

=== Other ethnic groups ===
Flag	Date	Use	Description
	2006?–present?	Flag of Black Canadians	The Canadian national flag with black instead of red.
	2008–present	Flag of Gaelic Canadians	Adopted by the Comhairle na Gàidhlig (The Gaelic Council of Nova Scotia), the salmon represents the gift of knowledge in the Gaelic storytelling traditions of Nova Scotia, Scotland and Ireland and the Isle of Man. The "G" represents the Gaelic language and the ripples are the manifestations of the language through its rich culture of song, story, music, dance and custom and belief system.
	2021–present	Flag of Black Nova Scotians	The red represents blood and sacrifice. The gold conveys cultural richness. The green symbolizes fertility and growth. The black stands for the people. The wave in the bottom centre has a dual meaning, representing the ocean and movements as well as honouring the journey of African Nova Scotian ancestors through the middle passage during the slave trade. On the left is half of a stylized heart (a version of the Sankofa symbol) with a yin and yang-like symbol embedded to represent heartbreak balanced with awareness. The image is encompassed with an incomplete circle representing those things absent but yet to come.
	2024–present	Flag of Irish Heritage Quebec	A yellow Celtic cross on a green background with a white crenellated border. Inspired by the flag of Quebec City.

== Municipal ==
Flag of Calgary

Flag of Edmonton

Flag of Hamilton

Flag of Montreal

Flag of Ottawa

Flag of Quebec City

Flag of Toronto

Flag of Vancouver

Flag of Winnipeg

== Historical ==
=== Historical national flags ===
Flag	Date	Use	Description
	1497–1707	Flag on John Cabot's ship, and used during the English colonization of the Americas before the Act of Union.	St George's Cross.
	1621–1707	Flag used during the Scottish colonization of the Americas before the Act of Union.	White saltire on blue ensign, St. Andrew's Cross.
	1608	Etandart François	Possibly flown by Samuel de Champlain at Quebec City.
	16th c. on	Ensign of the Royal French Navy	A plain white banner, as naval ensign, also used on land, especially on fortifications, as symbol of authority of the French state.
	1664	Flag of the Compagnie française des Indes occidentales	A white banner defaced with the Arms of France, three golden fleurs-de-lis on a blue escutcheon.
	1689	Merchant Flag of France	
	1707	United Empire Loyalists (British North America)	United Empire loyalist flag which was similar to the earlier version of the Union Jack but had slight changes in the fimbriation width. The United Empire Loyalists brought this flag to British North America when they left the United States. In present-day Canada, the flag continues to be used as symbol of pride and heritage for loyalist townships and organizations.
	1801–1964	Union Flag (1801–1964); Canadian Royal Union Flag (1964–present)	

=== Royal ===
Flag	Date	Use	Description
	1643	Royal standard of France	
	1534–1763	Royal Banner of France or "Bourbon Flag" was the most commonly used flag in New France	The banner flag has three gold fleurs-de-lis on a dark blue field arranged two and one.
	1962–2022	Queen Elizabeth II's personal Canadian flag	A banner of the royal arms of Canada defaced with a royal cypher of Queen Elizabeth II.
	2014–2025	Personal flag of the Duke of York for use in Canada	No longer used after Andrew Mountbatten-Windsor's withdrawal from public roles.
	2011–2022	Personal flag of the Duke of Cambridge for use in Canada	

==== Coronation standards ====
Flag	Date	Use	Description
	1937 and 1953	Coronations of George VI and Elizabeth and Elizabeth II	Banner of arms of the Royal Coat of Arms of Canada
	1911	Coronation of George V and Mary	Banner of arms of the Royal Coat of Arms of Canada

=== Civil ensigns ===
Flag	Date	Use	Description
	1892–1922	Canadian Red Ensign as authorized for use as a civil ensign through Admiralty warrant. Informal use of the Canadian Red Ensign as a symbol of Canada began as early as 1868.	
	1907–1922	Informal version of the Canadian Red Ensign commonly used in western Canada. Note the inclusion of all the provincial emblems.	
	1921–1957	Version of the Canadian Red Ensign, which was also used as a de facto national flag.	
	1957–1965	Version of the Canadian Red Ensign that had evolved as the de facto national flag.	

=== Government ensigns ===
Flag	Date	Description	Use
	1868–1921	A British colonial Blue Ensign defaced with the 1868 Great Seal of Canada	Since Confederation, worn by Canadian federal government ships, including of the Department of Marine and Fisheries, involved in tending lighthouses, performing search and rescue, ice-breaking, resupply of isolated outposts, and other services. Worn by Canadian government warships prior to formation of Naval Service of Canada/Royal Canadian Navy. (Also from 1910–1911 as naval ensign, then 1911–1922 as naval jack.)
	1921–1957	A British colonial Blue Ensign defaced with the 1921 arms of Canada	Used by ships of various Canadian federal departments, including Department of Transport fleet from 1936–1957. (Also as naval jack 1921–1957.)
	1957–1965	A British colonial Blue Ensign defaced with the 1957 arms of Canada	Used by ships of various Canadian federal departments, including Canadian Marine Service (1959–1962), and Canadian Coast Guard (as ensign) from 1962–1965. (Also as naval jack 1957–1965.)

=== Newfoundland ===
Flag	Date	Use	Description
	1904–1949	Dominion of Newfoundland	
	1870–1904	Newfoundland Colony	
	1862–1870	Newfoundland Colony	

=== Rebellions ===
Flag	Date	Use	Description
	1968–1971	Front de libération du Québec	Flag of the FLQ as seen at demonstrations in Montreal and the U.S. between 1968 and 1971
	1812–1821	Pemmican War	Metis Flag
	1837	Lower Canada Rebellion	This flag was created by Marie-Louise Félix, Émilie Berthelot and Marie-Louise-Zéphirine Labrie in 1837, also involved in the Association of Patriotic Ladies of the Deux-Montagnes County. We see a maple branch surmounted by a muskellunge, surrounded by a crown of cone and pine branches. The C would mean "Canada" (in the sense that this term had for the Patriots at the time) and JB would mean "Jean-Baptiste", the patron saint of "Canadians" since the creation of the Société Saint-Jean- Baptiste in 1834. The original is in Château Ramezay, in Montreal.
	1832–1838	Patriote flag	The proposed flag for the Republic of Lower Canada (1838). It is still used today by some souverainists, in mostly four variants: the original, and three versions with the yellow star in the top hoist corner. Of which, two of them have Henri Julien's Patriot painting of 1904, one in colour and the other stylised in black and white.
	1837–1838	Flag of the Republic of Canada	A blue-white-red vertical tricolour with two white stars representing the colonies of Upper and Lower Canada and a crescent moon representing the "hunter's clubs" that organized and led the insurrection affixed at the hoist.
	1869–1870	North-West Rebellion	Often mistaken as the flag used in the 1885 resistance, the flag used by the Provisional Government of Rupert's Land and the North-West was described in various ways. Most descriptions mention a fleur-de-lys, shamrock, and a white background.
	1885	Provisional Government of Saskatchewan	The day of the provisional government's proclamation, Father Vital Fourmond, a witness, wrote "As a flag [Riel] chose the white flag of ancient France [with a royal blue shield bearing three golden fleurs de lys], saying that he was called to renew its ancient glories. On it he placed a large image of Mary's immaculate heart."

=== Other ===
Flag	Date	Use	Description
	1827	Flag of the short lived Republic of Madawaska which was situated between Canada and the US.	
	1868	The Canadian Red Ensign used at Dominion Day celebrations in Barkerville, BC in support of Canadian Confederation, as Canada did not have an official flag.	
	1910–1913	Sledge flag used in Antarctica by C.S. Wright, a Canadian member of Robert Falcon Scott's Terra Nova Expedition.	
	Post 1910–c. 1945	British Empire flag	An unofficial flag of the British Empire featuring symbols of its constituent dominions and India. The Canadian coat of arms is present in the bottom hoist. It was flown by civilians as a display of patriotism on special occasions such as Empire Day. A surviving specimen from the British Empire Exhibition in 1924 is kept in the Canadian Flag Collection.

== Regional ==
=== Official ===
Flag	Date	Use	Description
	1994–present	Flag of Cape Breton Island	A white field with four narrow horizontal stripes at the bottom, blue over green over yellow over gray with a narrow black fimbriation. Toward the fly, the green bar rises to silhouette a hill or island. Toward the hoist is a green, stylized eagle in flight. Despite not being widely used, the Eagle flag was officially recognized and adopted by the Nova Scotian government in 1994.
	1938–present	Flag of Saguenay–Lac-Saint-Jean	A field party per fess, green and yellow, with a red-bordered grey ordinary cross; green represents the region's forests, yellow its agriculture, grey its industry and commerce, and red the vitality of the population.

=== Unofficial ===
Flag	Date	Use	Description
	Disputed–present	Flag of Cape Breton Island	A field tierced per forest green and white, with a green saltire and yellow circle reading "Cape Breton Island" on the top, and "Canada" on the bottom, with a green stylized map of Cape Breton Island in the middle. The green is taken from the island's tartan. Though being the most commonly used flag it is not the official flag and is disputed by supporters of the officially recognized 1993 flag designed by Kelly Gooding.
	1974–present	Flag of Labrador	A field party per fess, white and azure, with a green horizontal band across the centre and a spruce twig in the upper hoist.
	1880s–present	Newfoundland Tricolour	A field tierced per pale green, white, and pink.
	1949–present	Flag of Outer Bald Tusket Island	Flag used by one of the first micronations, named Principality of Outer Baldonia, it is sometimes used on fishing boats and on souvenirs.
	1988–present	Flag of Vancouver Island	A Blue Ensign defaced with the great seal of the Colony of Vancouver Island. Used informally today. This unofficial flag was designed in the 1980s to retroactively represent the colony (1849–1866). In 1865 the Crown gave colonies permission to place their badges on the fly of the Blue Ensign; thus vexillologists could argue that this flag is official.
	1988–present	Flag of Western Canada	Originally used by the Western Independence Party, it was designed in 1988 ahead of the party's first election.

== House flags of Canadian freight companies ==
Flag	Date	Use	Description
	1965–present	Canada Steamship Lines	
	1958–1965	Canada Steamship Lines	
	1867–1958	Quebec Steamship Company and Canada Steamship Lines	
	1944–present	Coopérative de Transport Maritime et Aérien	The project differs in different periods of the company's activity.
	1811–2019	Bowring Brothers	
	1893–1953	Canadian Australasian Line	
	1919–1986	Canadian National Steamship Company	
	1887–2005	CP Ships	
	19th c. – 1967	Job Brothers & Co., Limited	
	1910–1916	Royal Line	

== Yacht clubs of Canada ==
Burgee	Club
	Armdale Yacht Club
	Barrachois Harbour Yacht Club
	Bay of Quinte Yacht Club
	Bras d'Or Yacht Club
	Bronte Harbour Yacht Club
	Buffalo Canoe Club
	Dobson Yacht Club
	Etobicoke Yacht Club
	Northern Yacht Club
	Oakville Yacht Squadron
	Royal Hamilton Yacht Club
	Royal Lake of the Woods Yacht Club
	Royal St. Lawrence Yacht Club
	Royal Vancouver Yacht Club
	Royal Victoria Yacht Club
	Royal Canadian Yacht Club
	Royal Nova Scotia Yacht Squadron
	Windsor Yacht Club
	Queen's University at Kingston (College team)
	University of British Columbia (College team)

== See also ==
- Canadian Heraldic Authority
- Canadian heraldry
- Canadian royal symbols
- Great Canadian Flag Debate
- List of Canadian provincial and territorial symbols
- National symbols of Canada
