= List of country subdivision flags in North America =

This page lists the country subdivision flags in North America. It is a part of the Lists of country subdivision flags, which is split into continents due to its size.

== Antigua and Barbuda ==
=== Islands ===
Flag	Duration	Use	Description
	2018–present	Flag of Barbuda	A 3:1:3 horizontal tricolor of red, blue, and green. A yellow disc is in the center, and a frigatebird in flight is superimposed in the center, over all else.

== Canada ==
=== Provinces ===
Flag	Date	Use	Description
	1968–present	Flag of Alberta	A blue field with the shield of the coat of arms of Alberta charged in the centre
	1960–present	Flag of British Columbia	A banner of the coat of arms of British Columbia
	1965–present	Flag of Manitoba	A red field with the Royal Union Flag in the canton and the shield of the coat of arms of Manitoba charged in the fly
	1965–present	Flag of New Brunswick	A banner of the coat of arms of New Brunswick
	1980–present	Flag of Newfoundland and Labrador	A blue and white field party per pale (at nombril point) with a white border, white ordinary cross and white saltire, two triangular divisions in the fly lined in red, a golden arrow between two triangular divisions
	1858 (first use); 1929 (arms adopted); 2013–present (flag adopted)	Flag of Nova Scotia	A banner of arms of the coat of arms of Nova Scotia
	1965–present	Flag of Ontario	A red field with the Royal Union Flag in the canton and the shield of the coat of arms of Ontario charged in the fly
	1964–present	Flag of Prince Edward Island	A banner of the coat of arms of Prince Edward Island within a bordure compony of red and white
	1948–present	Flag of Quebec (the Fleurdelisé)	A blue field with an ordinary white cross and a white fleur-de-lis in each quadrant
	1969–present	Flag of Saskatchewan	A field party per fess, green and yellow, with the shield of the coat of arms of Saskatchewan in the canton and western red lily emblem charged in the fly

=== Territories ===
Flag	Date	Use	Description
	1969–present	Flag of the Northwest Territories	A vertical bicolour triband of blue, white, blue with the shield of the coat of arms of the Northwest Territories charged in the Canadian pale
	1999–present	Flag of Nunavut	A field party per pale, yellow and white, with a red inukshuk charged in the centre and a blue star in the upper fly
	1968–present	Flag of Yukon	A vertical tricolour triband of green, white, blue with the shield of the coat of arms of Yukon above a wreath of fireweed charged in the pale, with pale ratio of 1 to 1.5 to 1

== Costa Rica ==
=== Provinces ===
Flag	Administrative division	Adopted	Description
	Alajuela		White flag with the coat of arms of Alajuela Province in the center
	Cartago		Horizontal bicolor of red and blue
	Guanacaste		Horizontal tricolor of blue, white, and green, with a red triangle at the hoist
	Heredia		Vertical tricolor of yellow, white, and red, with the regional coat of arms in the central stripe
	Limón		Horizontal tricolor of green, blue, and white
	Puntarenas		From the upper hoist to the lower fly: a red triangle, a diagonal white stripe, a diagonal blue stripe, and a green triangle. In the center, an eleven-pointed golden star with the date "1848" in black.
	San José		Blue flag with a red border and a five-pointed white star in the center

== El Salvador ==
=== Departments ===
Flag	Subdivision	Adopted	Description
	Ahuachapán		Horizontal tricolor of blue, white, and blue, with the coat of arms of Ahuachapán in the center
	Cabañas		A vertical bicolor of blue and red separated by a white curved line
	Chalatenango	May 15, 1969	Horizontal tricolor of navy blue, white, and green. On the white stripe is the province name, "CHALATENANGO," in golden text, and on the green stripe is a white silhouette of a swing plough.
	Cuscatlán		
	La Libertad		
	La Paz		
	La Unión		
	Morazán		
	San Miguel		
	San Salvador		
	San Vicente		
	Santa Ana		
	Sonsonate		
	Usulután		

== Guatemala ==
=== Departments ===
Flag	Department
	Alta Verapaz
	Baja Verapaz
	Chimaltenango
	Chiquimula
	El Progresso
	Escuintla
	Guatemala
	Huehuetenango
	Izabal
	Jalapa
	Jutiapa
	Petén
	Quetzaltenango
	Quiché
	Retalhuleu
	Sacatepéquez
	San Marcos
	Santa Rosa
	Sololá
	Suchitepéquez
	Totonicapán
	Zacapa

== Honduras ==
=== Departments ===
Flag	Date	Use	Description
		Unofficial Flag of Atlántida Department	
		Flag of Choluteca Department	
		Flag of Colón Department	
		Flag of Comayagua Department	
		Flag of Francisco Morazán Department	
		Flag of Ocotepeque Department	
		Flag of Olancho Department	
		Flag of Santa Bárbara Department	
		Flag of Valle Department	

== Nicaragua ==
=== Departments ===
Flag	Subdivision	Adopted	Description
	Boaco		
	Carazo		
	Chinandega		
	Chontales		
	Estelí		
	Granada		
	Jinotega		
	León		
	Madriz		
	Managua		
	Masaya		
	Matagalpa		
	Nueva Segovia		
	Rivas		
	Rio San Juan		

=== Autonomous regions ===
Flag	Subdivision	Adopted	Description
	North Caribbean Coast Autonomous Region		
	South Caribbean Coast Autonomous Region		

== Panama ==
=== Provinces ===
Flag	Date	Use	Description
	?–present	Flag of Bocas del Toro Province	Divided diagonally in half from top-hoist corner to bottom-fly corner, green on bottom half and yellow on the top half. Three white five-pointed stars curving slightly in the middle at the top of a capital roman 'B' with a drop shadow.
	2004–present	Flag of Coclé Province	Vertical tricolor with, from hoist to fly, red, gray, and white. The red stripe has two gray diamonds, one towards the bottom corner from the top one. The gray stripe has two white diamonds, one at the bottom and one at the top. The white stripe has two red diamonds, one towards the bottom corner from the top one.
	1996–present	Flag of Colón Province	Horizontal tricolor with, from top to bottom, baby blue, white, and gold. The coat of arms of Colón is centered in the middle, with an arc of five gold five-pointed stars at the top.
	?–present	Flag of Chiriquí Province	Flag divided diagonally in half from the lower hoist corner to the upper fly corner, red at the top and green at the bottom. There are fourteen white five-pointed stars in the middle arrayed in a circle, similar to the EU flag.
	?–present	Flag of Darién Province	Flag divided diagonally in half from the lower hoist corner to the upper fly corner, baby blue at the top and green at the bottom. There are four yellow five-pointed stars, arrayed in a hard curve.
	1992–present	Flag of Herrera Province	Flag divided in half horizontally, with gold on the top half and blue on the bottom half. There is a labeled map of the province in the middle, with seven blue five-pointed stars at the top arrayed in a curve to represent each district in the province.
	1850–present	Flag of Los Santos Province	Horizontal tricolor with, from the top to the bottom, blue, gold, and red.
	2015–present	Flag of Panamá Oeste Province	Horizontal triband with, from top to bottom, gold, white, and gold. It also has a green triangle based at the hoist containing five white five-pointed stars arrayed in a curve.
	2019–present	Flag of Veraguas Province	Blue background with a white silhouette of the province. It also has twelve white five-pointed stars arrayed around the map.

=== Province-level indigenous regions ===
Flag	Date	Use	Description
	?–present	Flag of Emberá-Wounaan Comarca	Horizontal tricolor with, from top to bottom, a large green stripe and two smaller stripes, yellow and blue.
	2010–present	Flag of Guna Yala Comarca	Horizontal tricolor with an enlarged middle yellow stripe, and a top red stripe and bottom green stripe. There are two crossed arms in the middle, the right holding an arrow and the left holding a bow. There are eight black five-pointed stars arrayed in a curve around the top of the middle symbol.
	2009–present	Flag of Ngäbe-Buglé Comarca	Vertical tricolor with, from hoist to fly, red, white, and green stripes. In the center, there are three black five-pointed stars, with one stacked above the other two.
	?–present	Flag of Naso Tjër Di Comarca	The comarca's emblem centered in the middle of a plain white background.

== Saint Kitts and Nevis ==
=== Islands ===
Flag	Duration	Use	Description
	?–present	Flag of Nevis	The golden field stands for sunshine. In the canton is the flag of the Federation of Saint Kitts and Nevis. The triangle in the fly represents the conical shape of Nevis, with the blue being the ocean; the green being the verdant slopes of the island; and the white being the clouds that usually wreathe Nevis Peak.

== Saint Vincent and the Grenadines ==
=== Islands ===
Flag	Duration	Use	Description
	?–present	Flag of Bequia	
