= Canadian pale =

Triband flag where the centre band is wider than the outer bands

Flag of Canada, for which the term is named

In heraldry and vexillology, a Canadian pale is a centre band of a vertical triband flag (a pale in heraldry) that covers half the length of a flag, rather than a third as in most triband designs. This allows more space to display a central image (common charge).

== History ==
Georg Matthias Bist's 1964 proposal that helped inspire the flag of Canada

The Canadian Pale was a term invented to describe the distinctive design of a vertical triband field divided into 1:2:1 proportions of the current (and first official) Canadian national flag that was adopted in 1964. The name was suggested by Sir Conrad Swan, Rouge Dragon Pursuivant (a heraldic office in Britain), and first used by Elizabeth II as Queen of Canada proclaiming the new Canadian flag on 28 January 1965. The design of the flag it referred to was devised by members of a parliamentary committee assigned that task in 1964. John Ross Matheson, Prime Minister Lester B. Pearson's parliamentary secretary serving on the committee, produced the design by synthesizing design proposals by George F. G. Stanley and Georg Matthias Bist. This design revised a proposal by Alan Beddoe initially favoured by PM Pearson, dubbed the "Pearson Pennant". The new design widened the bars on the end, replicating the distinctive 1:2:1 proportions of Bist's design, while replicating the unique solely red-white colour scheme of Stanley's proposal. Both Stanley's and Bist's designs, unlike Beddoe's, featured a single maple leaf.

== Description ==
The classic Canadian pale is a square central panel occupying half of a flag with 1:2 proportions. However, some vexillologists apply the term to any central band that is half the width of the flag, even if this renders it non-square. Some usage even applies the term to broad centre panels wider than half the width of the flag, even if non-square. The term Canadian pale is also used for flags which do not originate in Canada. The 3:5 flag of Mississippi and proposed flag of Taiwan and the 2:3 flag of Saint Vincent and the Grenadines are all described as having a Canadian pale.

The Canadian pale is a popular feature of sub-national, civic and personal heraldry from Canada developed after 1965. A few examples can be found in the flag of the Northwest Territories , the flag of the city of Edmonton, the arms of Athabasca University, and in the arms of numerous individual recipients. It is incorporated in the flags of a number of First Nations, such as the Musqueam First Nation, and Curtis Wilson's pan-indigenous flag of the First Nations in Canada.

The term is sometimes used in an even looser sense to refer to any flag with a larger central panel, irrespective of whether or not it covers half the flag. By this looser description, the flag of Norfolk Island (stripes in a ratio of 7:9:7) and the flag of Iowa (ratio legally undefined, but usually the central stripe is less than twice that of the outer stripes) are sometimes considered to have a Canadian pale.

== Heraldry ==
The official blazon of the flag of Canada of the 1965 Proclamation of the new flag reads: gules on a Canadian pale argent a maple leaf of the first. The ordinary language description of the flag reads: "a red flag of the proportions two by length and one by width, containing in its centre a white square the width of the flag, bearing a single red maple leaf". Thus, the original definition of a Canadian pale refers to a square centre panel on a flag of 1:2 width to length proportions. In Canadian heraldry, the term has been extended to arms to indicate "a particularly wide pale".

In coats of arms, and heraldry in general, a "Canadian pale" is what might well be referred to in South African heraldry as a "broad pale" as its width is half that of the shield on which it is shown as opposed to the ordinary pale's third to a quarter. They are most commonly used in Canadian heraldry.

== Flag gallery ==
=== Canadian flags ===
==== Canadian subnational flags ====
Flag of the Northwest Territories (1969)

Flag of Yukon (1968; 1:2, 2:3:2) (Note: If present, parentheses following name of flag indicate: year adopted or year adopted and relinquished, flag proportions of width by length, and the proportions of the division of the field into end bars and centre panel of Canadian/broad pale. They follow the following format ([year adopted or year adopted and relinquished)]; [length]:[width], [bar length at hoist]:[centre panel length]:[bar length at fly]).)

==== Canadian federal government flags ====
Flag of the Supreme Court of Canada (2021)

==== Canadian municipal flags ====
Flag of Edmonton, Alberta (1966-1986)

Flag of Kimberley, British Columbia (2005)

Flag of Amherstburg, Ontario

Granted flag of Cornwall, Ontario (1995)

Flag of Hamilton, Ontario (2003)

Flag of Prince Albert, Saskatchewan (1980)

=== Other flags ===
==== National flags ====
Bandera Mayor of Bolivia (1825–1826)

Bandera Menor of Bolivia (1825–1826)

Flag of Saint Vincent and the Grenadines (1985; 2:3, 1:2:1)

==== Subnational flags ====
Flag of the Santiago del Estero Province, Argentina

Flag of Norfolk Island, Australia (1979; 1:2, 7:9:7)

Flag of the Federation of Bosnia and Herzegovina (1996–2007; 3:5, 1:3:1)

Flag of the Austral Islands, French Polynesia (1985; 2:3, 1:3:1)

Flag of Putrajaya, Malaysia (2001)

Flag of Bohol, Philippines (1969) (Note: The official legislation does not specify the width of the centre panel (pale) relative to the end bars (sides))

Flag of the Subcarpathian Voivodeship, Poland (2000; 5:8, 3:10:3)

Flag of Irkutsk Oblast, Russia (1997; 2:3, 1:2:1)

Flag of Kostroma Oblast, Russia (2000; 2:3, 1:2:1)

Flag of Novgorod Oblast, Russia (2007; 2:3, 1:2:1)

Flag of Novosibirsk Oblast, Russia (2003; 2:3, 5:3:2:3:5)

Flag of Tver Oblast, Russia (1996; 2:3, 1:2:1)

Flag of Iowa, US (1921) (Note: The official Iowa State Code, Section 1B.1 "Specifications of state flag", does not codify the proportions of the centre panel relative to the end bars. But an editor's note appended to the published code states that its width is "about equal to their sum".)

Flag of Mississippi, US (2021) (Note: The Mississippi State Code specifies the flag of Mississippi's dimensions as "3:5, but variable" and it does not specify the proportions of the centre panel to the end bars, only that the red bars be fives times the width of the gold. Nonetheless, the flag is manufactured with a blue centre panel wider than the red and gold end bars.)

==== Municipal flags ====
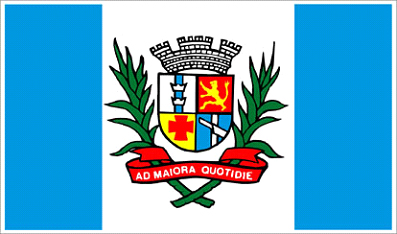
Flag of Carpina, Pernambuco, Brazil

Flag of Cienfuegos, Cuba

Flag of Quito, Ecuador

Flag of Kanepi Parish, Estonia (2018; 7:11, 2:7:2)

Flag of Central Ostrobothnia, Finland

Flag of Abasha Municipality, Georgia

Flag of Ropaži Municipality, Latvia

Flag of Malbork County, Pomeranian Voivodeship, Poland (2000; 5:8, 1:3:1)

Flag of Johannesburg, South Africa

Flag of the island of La Gomera (Canary Islands, Spain)

Flag of Ivano-Frankivsk, Ukraine

Flag of Myrhorod, Ukraine

Flag of Saky, Crimea, Ukraine

Flag of Coventry, England, United Kingdom

Flag of Birmingham, Alabama, US (1925; 10:19, 4:7:4)

Lee County, Florida, US

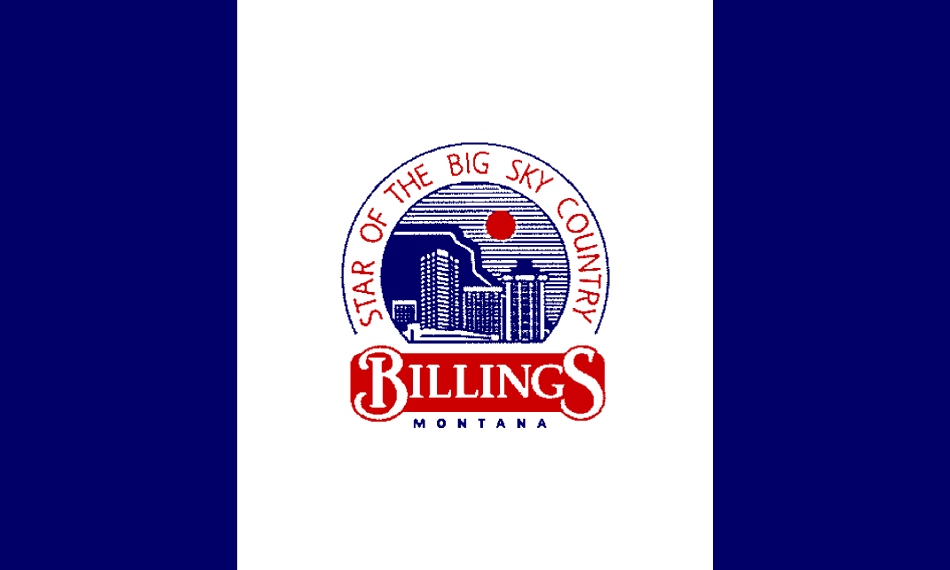
Flag of Billings, Montana, US (1986; 3:5, 1:2:1)

Flag of Columbus, Ohio, US (1929) (Note: By municipal code, the dimensions of the flag of Columbus, Ohio are officially 10:19 and the proportions of its vertical bars are 1:1:1. But, even for official use, the flag is often manufactured with a centre white panel about twice the width of the gold and red bars flanking it.)

Flag of Dayton, Ohio, US (1917–1958)

==== Proposed flags ====
Ash Nallawalla's 1998 Australian flag proposal

Canadian Duality Flag

Popular flag of Cape Breton Island, Nova Scotia, Canada (unofficial, date uncertain)

Proposed Flag of New Zealand by Clark Titman (1967)

Proposed 1996 Liu flag of Taiwan

Proposed flag of Mississippi, US, by Laurin Stennis (2014)

== See also ==
- Pale (heraldry)
- Spanish fess, an analogous horizontal feature
- List of Canadian flags
- List of proposed Canadian national flags
