= Coat of arms of Edmonton =

Heraldic emblem of the city

Coat of Arms of Edmonton
- Armiger: Edmonton, Alberta
- Adopted: 1994
- Crest: A mace or
- Shield: Purpure a fess wavy Argent charged with a bar wavy Azure between in chief a winged cogwheel and in base a garb Or on a chief Azure fimbriated Argent a demi sun issuant in splendour Or;
- Supporters: Dexter an explorer tempore 1796 proper habited in winter garb about his waist a sash chequy Or and Azure bearing in his sinister hand a musket barrel upwards and on his dexter hip hanging over his opposite shoulder a powder horn and bag all Or sinister a representation of Athena proper crined Or habited Azure bearing beneath her sinister arm a book and in her sinister hand a torch all or.
- Compartment: A grassy mount Vert.
- Motto: INDUSTRY • INTEGRITY • PROGRESS;
- Other elements: The shield compartment and motto are surmounting an upright mace Or.

The coat of arms of Edmonton is the heraldic symbol used to represent the city. The coat of arms was granted to Edmonton on 28 October 1994.

== Blazon ==
- Arms: Purpure a fess wavy Argent charged with a bar wavy Azure between in chief a winged cogwheel and in base a garb Or on a chief Azure fimbriated Argent a demi sun issuant in splendour Or;
- Supporters: On a grassy mound Vert dexter an explorer tempore 1796 proper habited in winter garb about his waist a sash chequy Or and Azure bearing in his sinister hand a musket barrel upwards and on his dexter hip hanging over his opposite shoulder a powder horn and bag all Or sinister a representation of Athena proper crined Or habited Azure bearing beneath her sinister arm a book and in her sinister hand a torch the shield compartment and motto surmounting an upright mace all Or;
- Motto: INDUSTRY • INTEGRITY • PROGRESS;

== Symbolism ==
- Shield: The sun emblazoned on the shield represents Edmonton's great amount of sunshine. The city's importance as an aviation and industrial centre is illustrated by a winged wheel. A wavy bar symbolizes the North Saskatchewan River. A sheaf symbolizes agriculture.
- Supporters: In dexter, an explorer represents the city's fur-trading past. In sinister, Athena, the goddess of wisdom, represents the city's educational institutions, especially the University of Alberta.
- Compartment: The supporters stand on a rendition of the river valley where many recreational activities take place.
- Motto: A scroll below the arms reads "Industry – Integrity – Progress". This motto has long been used as the motto of the city and repeats the themes of the shield.

== See also ==
- Flag of Edmonton
- Coat of arms of Alberta
