= Flag of Hamilton =

Flag of Hamilton may refer to:

- Flag of Hamilton, Bermuda
- Flag of Hamilton, Ontario, Canada
