= Kay L =

- Born: Kyle Levi Patrick Layton; Zimbabwe
- Genres: Hip hop, RnB
- Occupations: Rapper; songwriter

Kay L aka 'Kyle Layton' is a Zimbabwean recording artist and anti-racism activist based in Canada.

== Background ==
Kay L was born in Zimbabwe and was raised in the north east quadrant of Calgary Canada. He started music with the group District 5 before becoming a solo artist. After his debut mixtape Nightshift, he has been seen on tour with artists such as Rihanna, Snoop Dogg, 50 Cent, Ice Cube, Sean Paul, Nas, Akon, Nelly and several others. His song Raindrops became a radio hit across stations in Canada and in select stations in America. In 2019, his song "Wish They Would" became popular on the radio in Sierra Leone and he donated the royalties for that song to an orphanage in the country.

Kay L has received some recognition and awards in his career which include YYC Music Awards Rap recording artist of the year 2016, Electronic recording artist of the year 2018, Urban recording artist of the year 2017 and Zimbabwe Achievers Awards Male Artist of the Year 2019. In 2016, Kay L received the Calgary White Hat and also received The Obsidian Award in 2014. In 2011 with District 5, he was nominated for the JUNO Award for their song Still Fly which featured Drake. In 2021, Kay L was listed in the Calgary list of 40 under 40 influencers in the province.

== Activism ==
Kay L is a Black Lives Matter movement activist, in 2016, together with two colleagues, he started Black Lives Matter YYC known for leading protestors through the streets of Calgary. In 2020, Black Lives Matter YYC held a protest which had over 10 000 participants thus becoming the biggest protest in Calgary's history.

== Discography ==
- Born 2 Be ft. Stephen Voyce
- The Antidote ft. Saukrates
- EXIT ft. Bobby Soul
- Take It All Back ft. Nadi Downs
- Retired Super Heroes
- La La Love ft. Bobby Soul
- I'll Be Fine ft. Stephen Voyce
- In This Moment ft. Stephen Voyce
- Raindrops ft. Kay L & Stephen Voyce
- Nothing 2 U ft. Stephen Voyce
- Starting Over ft. Stephen Voyce
- Before The Money ft. Stephen Voyce & Bobby Blastem
- Love From Me ft. Bobby Blastem & Bobby Soul
- Hang It Up ft. Stephen Voyce
- Animal ft. Stephen Voyce
- Dirt On My Name- Kay L ft Stephen Voyce
