= Coat of arms of Calgary =

Heraldic emblem of the city

- Armiger: Calgary, Alberta
- Adopted: 1902
- Crest: A setting sun or rayed sable behind a mural crown or masoned sable
- Shield: Argent on St George's Cross a Maple Leaf vert and or charged with a bull buffalo proper in chief a sun rayed or and tenne setting behind mountains azure and argent
- Supporters: In dexter a horse argent in sinister a steer proper
- Compartment: Dexter to sinister: a maple leaf gules and or a leek proper two shamrocks gules a rose gules two shamrocks gules a thistle proper a maple leaf gules and or
- Motto: Onward
- Other elements: The Union Jack and Canadian Red Ensign in saltire below the motto

The coat of arms of Calgary was adopted in 1902. The arms existed only in black and white until 1984, when an alderman asked the city to develop it in full colour.

The King's Own Calgary Regiment (RCAC) uses a modified version of the Calgary's arms as its regimental badge, and also uses the same motto, "Onward".

== Symbols ==
- Crest: A mural crown signifying loyalty, with a setting sun.
- Shield:
  - Chief: A setting sun over the Rocky Mountains
  - Charges: A bull buffalo charging a maple leaf (representing Canada) that surmounts the Saint George's Cross.
- Compartment: The mount consists of two red maple leaves (symbolizing Canada), a thistle (for Scotland), leek (for Wales), shamrocks (for Ireland) and a rose (for England).
- Supporters: A horse and a steer, representing the early Calgarian economy.
- Scroll: The city motto, "Onward" between the years of incorporation as a town (1884) and as a city (1894).

The Union Flag and the Canadian Red Ensign are crossed under the scroll.

The landscape in the chief and the cross in the shield body are a reversal of the coat of arms of Alberta.

== See also ==
- Flag of Calgary
