= History of flags =

History and development of the concept of flags

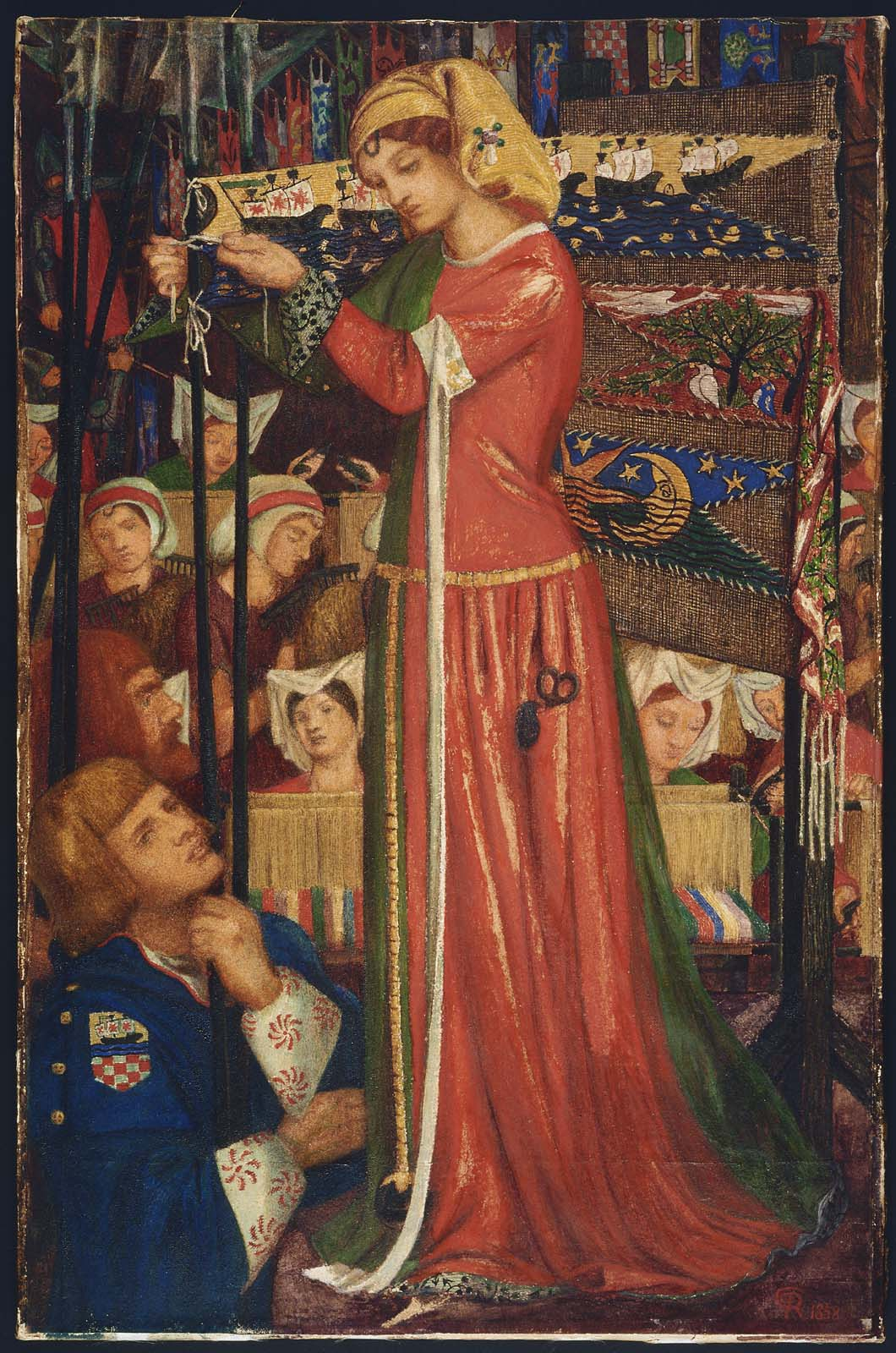
Before the Battle, Dante Gabriel Rossetti (1858), showing a woman attaching a flag to the pole of a spear

A flag is a distinctive piece of fabric used as a symbol, a signalling device, or for decoration. While the origin of flags is unknown, flag-like symbols have been described as far back as 11th-century BC China and have been used by other ancient civilisations such as Egypt and Rome.

During the Medieval period, silk from China allowed a variety of peoples, such as the Arabs and the Norse, to develop flags which flew from poles. Developments in heraldry led to the creation of personal heraldic banners for rulers and other important people in the European kingdoms. Flags began to be regularly used on board ships for identification and communication in the Age of Sail. In the 18th century and onwards, a rising tide of nationalism around the world meant that common people began to regularly identify themselves with nation-states and their symbols, including flags. In the modern day, every national entity and many sub-national entities employ flags for identification.

== Etymology ==
While the exact etymological origin is unknown, the word 'flag' first appears in English in the late 15th century. Possible origins include a variation of Middle English flakken, "to flap, flutter" which may further originate from Old Norse flaka, "to flicker, flutter, hang loose." These may be derived from Proto-Germanic flago- and the Proto-Indo-European root plak- ("to be flat"). The word first seems to have come into widespread use in the 16th century and soon came to encompass a variety of items, including banners, ensigns, gonfalons and others.

== Proto-flags ==
The origin of flags is unknown. Some of the earliest known banners come from ancient China to identify different parts of the army. For example, it is recorded that the armies of the Zhou dynasty in the 11th century BC carried a white banner before them, although no extant depictions exist of these banners. An early representation of such Chinese flags is a low-relief sculpture on the tomb of Emperor Wu of Han that shows two horseman bearing banners attached to poles and staffs.

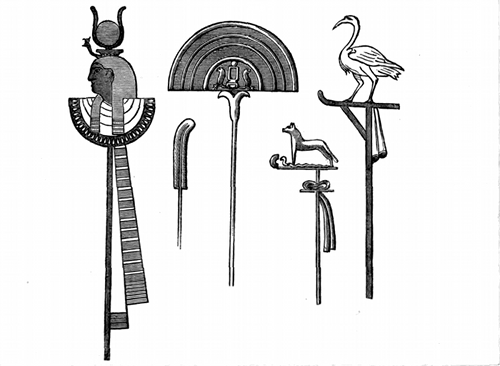
Illustration of Egyptian standards.

Early representations of standards can be found on Egyptian bas-reliefs such as the Narmer Palette, which is said to be the earliest representation. These vexilloids, or flag-like standards, were symbols of the nomes of pre-dynastic Egypt. In fact, ancient Greek writers attributed the creation of standards to the Egyptians. According to Diodorus, Egyptian standards generally consisted of figures of sacred animals on the end of a staff or spear. Another often used symbol was a figure resembling an expanded semi-circular fan.

=== Roman standards ===
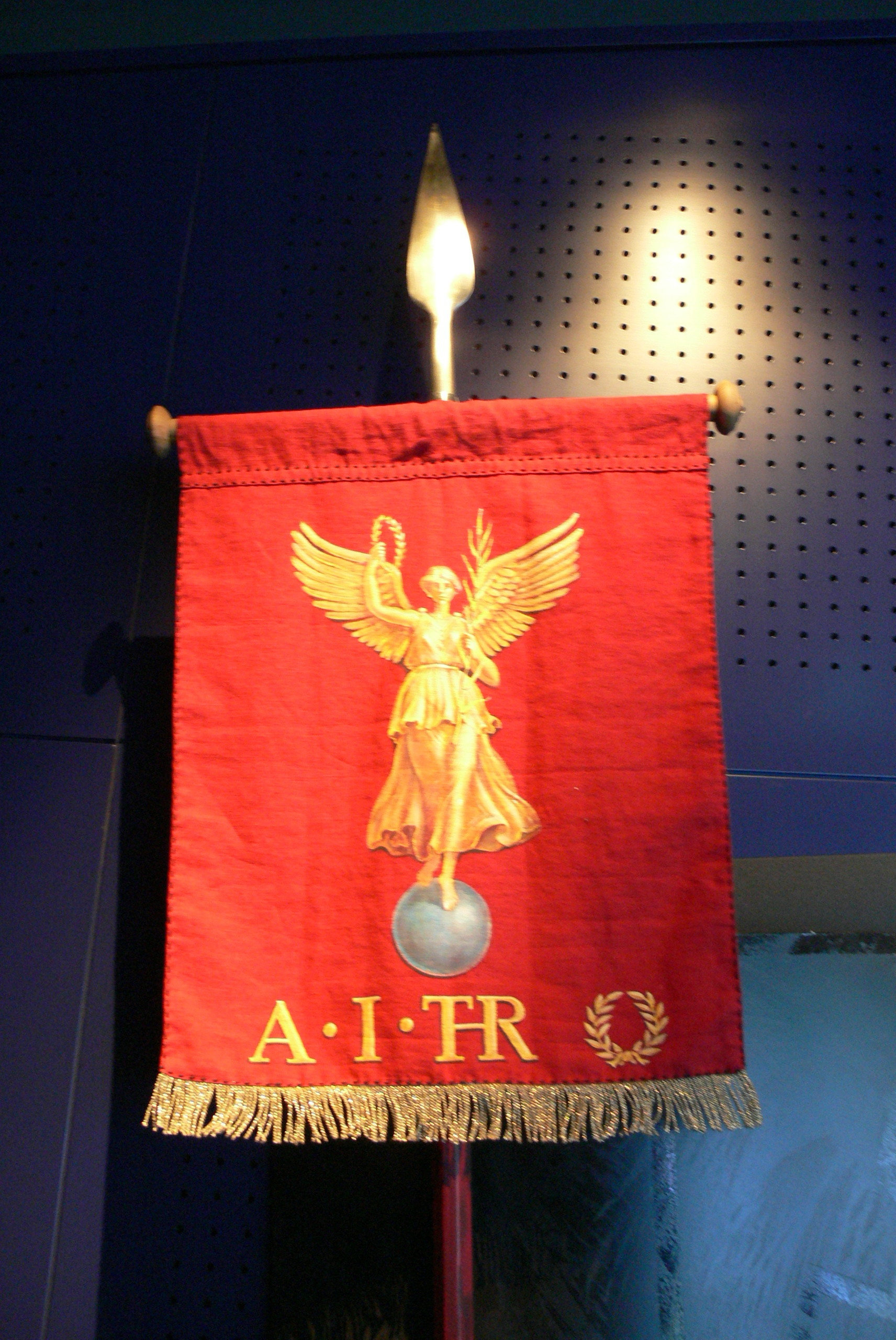
Modern reproduction of a Roman cavalry vexillum

While China, Greece, and Persia are all known to have used cloth banners to designate parts of their armies, in ancient times, it was the Romans who made the most widespread use of flag like symbols to represent their army. These banners, also known as a vexillum, (Note: In medieval times the pastoral staff of the bishop often had a small scarf attached to it. This was known as the vexillum, and was supposed to be derived from the Labarum because of its association with the first Christian emperor, Constantine the Great.) were used to represent each army unit starting around 100 BC. The vexillum was composed of a piece of cloth fastened to a cross bar at the top of a spear, sometimes with fringe around the outside. The only extant Roman vexillum is dated to the first half of the 3rd century AD and is housed in the Pushkin Museum of Fine Arts. It is an almost square piece of coarse linen cloth with the image of the goddess Victoria.

Roman emperors used a banner similar in form called a labarum. It frequently bore upon it a representation of the emperor, sometimes by himself and sometimes accompanied by the heads of members of his family. It became associated with Constantine the Great and later Christianity after he supposedly marched under a labarum bearing the Chi Rho. These Roman standards were guarded with religious veneration in the temples of the metropolis and chief cities of the empire.

Another Roman standard that was widespread by the time of the 4th century author Vegetius was the draco or dragon, a symbol originally borrowed from the Parthians some time after the death of Trajan. It would take the form of a dragon affixed to a lance with silver jaws and a body of colourful silk. When the wind blew down its open jaws the body would become inflated, similar to a windsock. It would sometimes contain a device to produce a shrill whistle sound, and was used to intimidate enemy troops.

== Medieval period ==
With the innovation of silk in China and subsequent propagation along the Silk Road, flags as we know them today began to develop. Flags that comprise cloth attached to an upright pole at one side seem to have first been regularly used by the Saracens who introduced it to the Western world, although they would not gain popularity in the latter until the 9th-century. Flags are often mentioned in the early history of Islam and may have been copied from India. Tradition holds that a black flag was flown by Muhammad during the Conquest of Mecca, in the 7th century, and that his followers flew green flags. There is evidence of such standards being used by the grandsons of Muhammad during the Rashidun Caliphate onward which were generally triangular and flown from a vertical flag pole. Subsequent Islamic dynasties used a variety of different coloured banners to identify themselves and were often drawn from flags supposedly flown by the prophet during his life. (Note: The Umayyad Caliphate are said to have used white flag to honour the Battle of Badr, Muhammad's first major battle. The Abbasid Caliphate used a Black Standard to set themselves apart from the Umayyads who they overthrew and as a sign of mourning for the deaths of the prophet's relatives at the Battle of Karbala. The Shia Fatimid Caliphate used the white standards as well as green flags as it was thought to be the prophet's favourite colour.)

Another 9th-century vertical flying flag is the raven banner that was used widely by the Vikings. Although no complete illustration of this banner exists, it probably appears on Northumbrian coins from the start of the century and later, in the 11th century, is most likely seen on the Bayeux Tapestry.

=== Heraldic flags ===
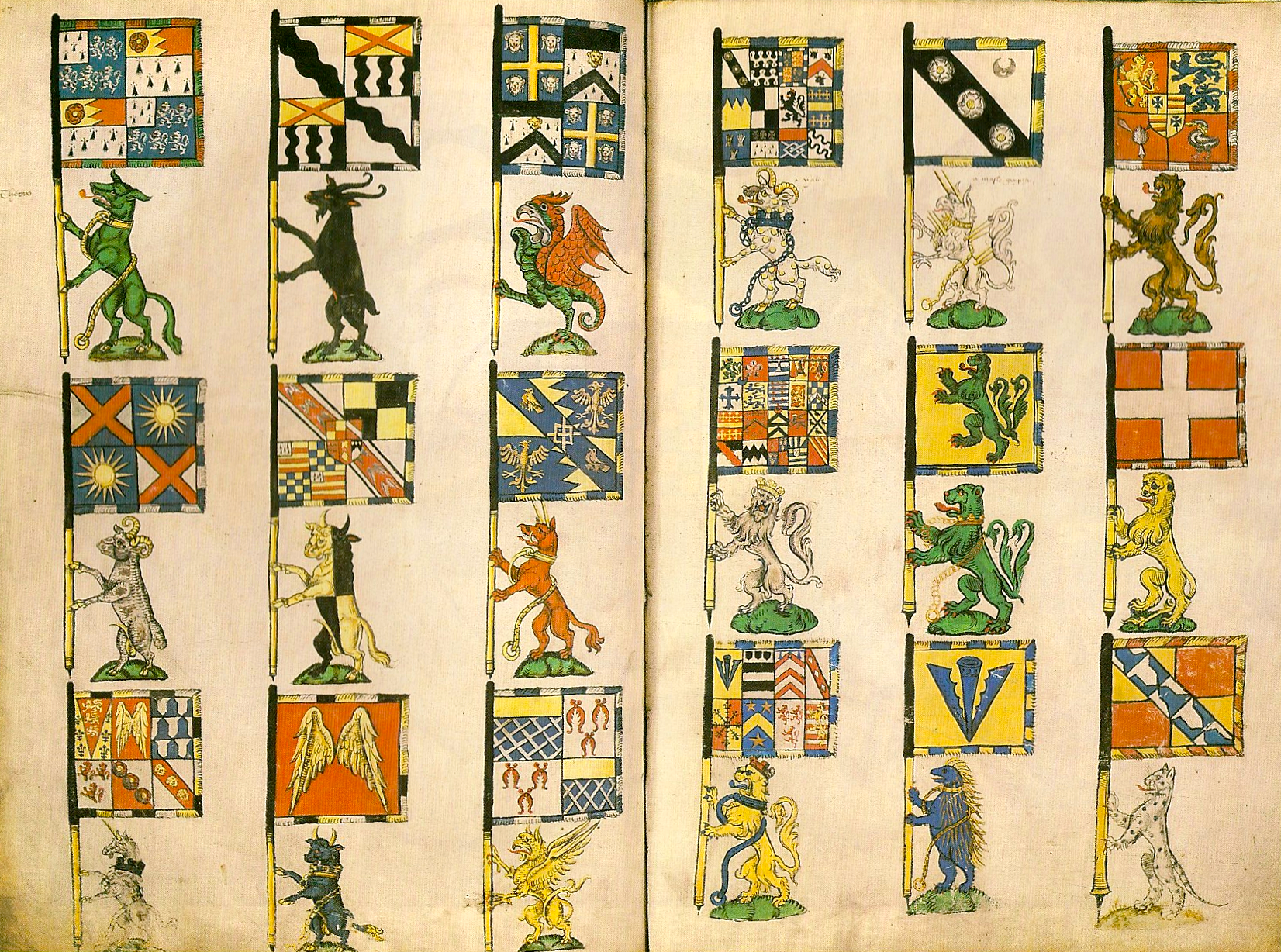
Banners of arms belonging to the mid-sixteenth-century Knights of the Order of the Garter supported by their respective heraldic beasts

A major stage in the development of flags in the west was the art of heraldry. Heraldry, which developed in approximately the second quarter of the 12th century, primarily deals with identification by means of devices placed on shields, with these symbols becoming the means by which knights and later other upper-class individuals became identified. After some time, these heraldic badges came to be emblazoned on flags. To start with, the banners were extensions of the gonfanon, which consisted of a flag tied to a lance, but soon became diverse displays of important people's arms. Traditionally, there are several types such as, pennons, heraldic standards, or banners of arms.

The pennon was a small, elongated flag with either pointed or swallow-tailed end. It would have been marked with the badge or other armorial ensign of the owner and by displayed upon their lance as a personal ensign. A banner of arms is square or oblong and larger than the pennon, bearing the entire coat of arms of the owner and composed precisely, as upon a shield, but in a square or rectangular shape. (Note: "In the olden time, when a Knight had distinguished himself by conspicuous gallantry, it was the custom to mark his meritorious conduct by prompt advancement on the very field of battle. In such a case, the point or points of the good Knight’s Pennon were rent off, and thus the ... small Flag was reduced to the square form of the Banner, by which thenceforth he was to be distinguished" - Boutell (1914), pp. 247–248)

Three of Henry VII's heraldic standards from across his reign.

The heraldic standard appeared around the middle of the 14th century, and it was in general use by personages of high rank during the two following centuries. The standard appears to have been adopted for the special purpose of displaying badges. The standard was often more versatile than a banner of arms because no one could possess more than one banner, since it displayed a set of unchangeable heraldic arms. A single individual; however, could possess as many standards as they wanted, since this flag displayed badges, which could be created at any time the owner wanted. For example, the standards of Henry VII were mostly green and white (the colours of the Tudor livery) and had in one "a red firye dragon;" in another, "a donne kowe;" and in a third, "a silver greyhound and two red roses."

Heraldic standards are still in use in Scotland; at Highland gatherings, the standard of the clan chiefs is displayed on the pipes of the Pipe major of the clan.

=== Flags during the crusades ===
During the Crusades, beginning at the end of the 11th century, there were developments of flags. During the first crusade banners were used by kings and nobles in an extensions of the practices in Europe with the addition of some holy orders adopting them. However, about a century into the period the rank and file from different realms began to differentiate themselves by means of variations in the colour of the crosses upon their shoulders. In 1188 Philip II of France decreed that his colours be added to a cross (a red cross on a white field) and soon after Henry II of England decreed the use of a white cross on a red field. These coloured crosses would for some unknown reason be swapped, but remained in use in England and France as symbols of the kingdoms, in the form of Saint George's Cross and the Cross of St. Denis respectively. Other Realms had similar stories, for example the black and white Cross of Teutonic Knights was also born of the crusades.

== Maritime flags ==
Flags have probably been used at sea as a form of communication since the earliest days of trading ships, with some evidence of the practice as far back as the Ancient Greeks. As early as the 13th century, the Italian maritime republics were using distinct flags for naval identification and by the 16th century English and Scottish ships were flying flags to show their country of origin, with designs derived from badges worn by their respective soldiers during the Middle Ages. Flags also became the preferred means of communications at sea, resulting in various systems of flag signals; see, international maritime signal flags.

== National flags ==
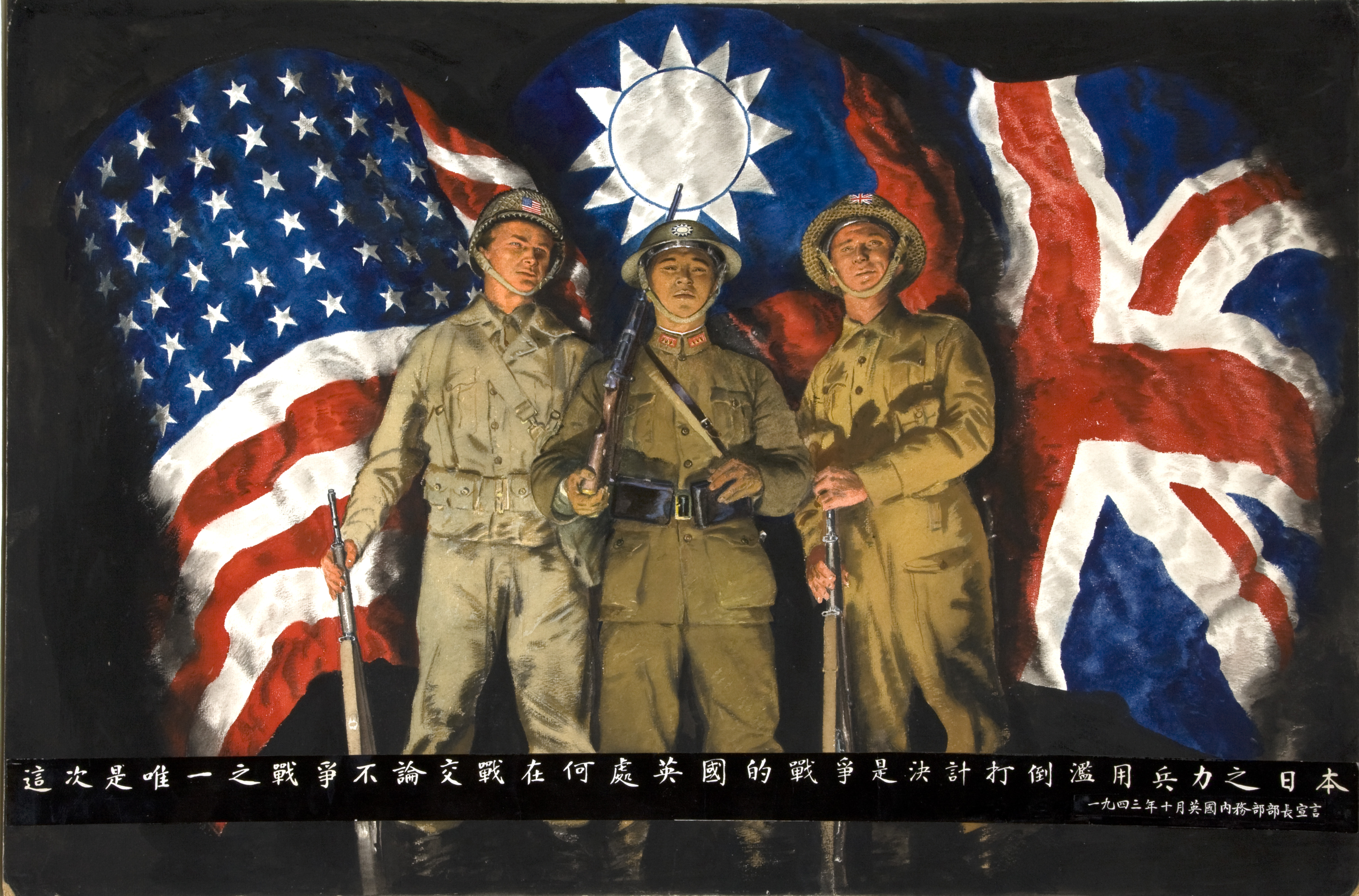
Chinese Second World War propaganda poster showing American, Chinese and British soldiers with the national flags of their respective countries

Originally, flags representing a country would generally be the personal flag of its rulers; however, over time, the practice of using personal banners as flags of places was abandoned in favour of flags that had some significance to the nation, often its patron saint. Early examples of these were the maritime republics such as Genoa that could be said to have a national flag as early as the 12th century. However, these were still mostly used in the context of marine identification.

An early example, that prefigured to developments to come, was the Prince's Flag which emerged as a flag of resistance and as a symbol of liberty during the 80 years war which lead to the formation of the United Provinces. It is notable for being one of the first European flags that broke with the tradition set down in the medieval context of cross flags representing realms.

Although some flags date back earlier, widespread use of flags outside of military or naval context begins only with the rise of idea of the nation state at the end of the 18th century and particularly are a product of the Age of Revolution. Revolutions such as those in France and America called for people to begin thinking of themselves as citizens as opposed to subjects under a king, and thus necessitated flags that represented the collective citizenry, not just the power and right of a ruling family. With nationalism becoming common across Europe in the 19th century, national flags came to represent most of the states of Europe. Flags also began fostering a sense of unity between different peoples, such as the Union Jack representing a union between England and Scotland, or began to represent unity between nations in a perceived shared struggle, for example, the Pan-Slavic colors or later Pan-Arab colors.

As Europeans colonised significant portions of the world, they exported ideas of nationhood and national symbols, including flags, with the adoption of a flag becoming seen as integral to the nation-building process. Political change, social reform, and revolutions combined with a growing sense of nationhood among ordinary people in the 19th and 20th centuries led to the birth of new nations and flags around the globe.

With so many flags being created, interest in these designs began to develop and the study of flags, vexillology, at both professional and amateur levels, emerged. After World War II, Western vexillology went through a phase of rapid development, with many research facilities and publications being established.
