= Lists of country subdivision flags =

This overview lists flags used by first-level and second-level country subdivisions. The flags of country subdivisions exhibit a wide variety of regional influences and local histories, as well as widely different styles and design principles. For example, some Indonesian provincial flags features a coat of arms, due to many provincial coat of arms within the province used on their flag. Some Estonian county flags features the green and white background with the coat of arms of the county.

Subdivision flags were not always ubiquitous. Many country subdivisions went decades without a flag, until a certain event or an independence or a formation of the country to adopt a creation of the flag. A panel then reviewed the five winning entries, choosing one to become the official subdivision flag. Western Australia's example is typical of the flag adoption processes that many subdivisions undertook with their flags. The 1,000th anniversary of Gloucestershire's founding also spurred the creation of a flag, in 2008. The status of these flags varies from one country or sovereign state to the next: most of them are official flags, whereas others are only used de facto, sometimes to indicate a desire for more autonomy or independence. Some flags, such as the flags of Leicestershire and Warwickshire, were created by the College of Arms in the United Kingdom.

Due to its size, the list is split into continents:

- List of country subdivision flags in Africa
- List of country subdivision flags in Asia
- List of country subdivision flags in Europe
- List of country subdivision flags in North America
- List of country subdivision flags in Oceania
- List of country subdivision flags in South America

== Historical states ==
=== Former territories ===
Klaipėda

=== Ottoman Empire ===
Autonomous provinces/states

Crete

Ikaria

Samos

Scutari

Septinsular Republic

Provinces

Algiers

Egypt

Herzegovina

Tripolitania

Tunis

Sharifate

Mecca

Vilayet

Bosnia

== See also ==
- Vexillology
- Glossary of vexillology
- Vexillological symbol
- Civil flag
- Ensign (flag)
- Ethnic flag
- Flag families
- History of flags
- Maritime flag
- National flag
- National coat of arms
- National emblem
- National seal
- National symbol
- State flag
- Galleries and lists:
  - Armorial of dependent territories
  - Armorial of sovereign states
  - Gallery of sovereign state flags
  - Gallery of flags of dependent territories
  - Lists of flags
  - List of flags by design
  - List of national flags by design
  - List of national flags of sovereign states
  - List of cultural flags
  - List of city flags
  - List of Japanese flags
  - List of United Kingdom flags
  - Flags of Europe
  - List of country subdivision flags in Oceania
  - List of Antarctic flags
  - List of flags by color combination
  - List of sovereign states by date of current flag adoption
  - List of former sovereign states
  - Flags of formerly independent states
  - Gallery pages of flags of country subdivisions
  - Flags of micronations
