= Flag of Edmonton =

Canadian municipal flag

Edmonton
- Adopted: 1986
- Design: Triband with a Canadian pale
- Designed by: Norman Yates

Former flag, used from 1966 to 1986

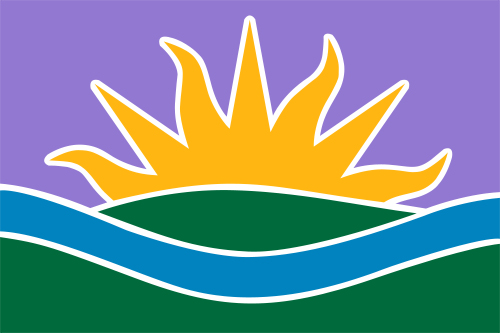
Rejected alternate municipal flag design by Ryan McCourt

The flag of Edmonton in Alberta, Canada features the coat of arms on a white square (Canadian pale) surmounting a light blue field.

The colours of the flag, white and blue, symbolize peace and water (for the North Saskatchewan River) respectively. The city flag was first approved by Edmonton City Council on 12 December 1966, designed by artist Norman Yates, and was updated in 1986. It was originally adopted for the Canadian Centennial.

In 2016 Mayor Don Iveson supported an effort to adopt a new flag by artist Ryan McCourt and adapting the coat of arms. A winning entry in a First Nations Treaty 6 art contest, Grand Chief Randy Ermineskin gave it to Iveson as a gift, in August, during treaty recognition ceremonies.

McCourt's flag borrowed elements from the city's coat of arms and was inspired by the text stating that the document is enduring "as long as the sun shines, as long as the grass grows, and as long as the river flows." Due to a lack of support, Iveson abandoned the flag redesign in 2017.

== See also ==
- Coat of arms of Edmonton
- Flag of Alberta
- Flag of Calgary
