= Coat of arms of Johannesburg =

Coat of arms of Johannesburg

The Johannesburg municipal council assumed a coat of arms in 1907, and had it granted by the College of Arms on 20 August 1907. The design, by W. Sandford Cotterill, consisted only of a shield : Vert, a fess between three battery stamps Or (i.e. a green shield displaying a golden horizontal stripe between three battery stamps). The motto was Fortiter et recte.

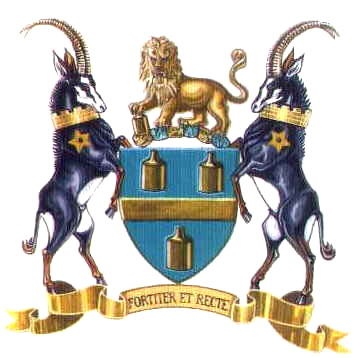
Old coat of arms, used between 1939 and 1997

In May 1939, the College of Arms granted a crest (a gold lion resting a paw on a battery stamp) and supporters (two sable antelope, each with a gold mural crown around its neck and a gold star on its shoulder). The full achievement of arms was registered with the Transvaal Provincial Administration in November 1951 and at the Bureau of Heraldry in November 1966.

The Greater Johannesburg Metropolitan Council assumed a new coat of arms in 1997, and registered it at the Bureau of Heraldry in November 1997. The arms are Vert, a fret couped Or, the mascle voided Gules, between in chief and in base respectively four shield thongs Argent; behind the shield a spine erect Or, plumed Sable. The supporters are two young golden lions, each wearing a red and blue beaded collar; the motto is Unity in development.

== See also ==
- Flag of Johannesburg
