= Symbols of Yukon =

Canada's Territory

Yukon is one of Canada's territories, and has established several territorial symbols.

== Official symbols ==
	Symbol	Image	Adopted	Remarks
Coat of arms	Coat of arms of Yukon		1956	It was approved officially by Queen Elizabeth II
Flag	Flag of Yukon	Yukon	March 1, 1968	
Shield of arms	Shield of arms of Yukon		1956	Granted with other elements of the coat of arms
Floral	Fireweed (Epilobium angustifolium)	Fireweed	1957	
Tree	Subalpine fir (Abies lasiocarpa)	Subalpine fir	2001	The sap drawn from the blisters on its bark has been used by First Nation people as a traditional medicine for lung ailments.
Bird	Raven (Corvus corax)	Raven	1985	The raven is seen everywhere in Yukon. Raven is called "crow" by Yukon First Nations people.
Gemstone	Lazulite	Lazulite	February 1976	Lazulite is found in the layered sedimentary rock of the Blow River area in Ivvavik National Park. The colour and crystalline qualities of Yukon's lazulite are among the finest in the world.
Tartan	Woven cloth that is composed of green, dark blue, magenta, yellow and white stripes in varying widths on a light blue background.		1984	

== Great Seal ==
Like Nunavut, Yukon does not have an official Great Seal.
