= Flag of Calgary =

Flag of the city of Calgary

City of Calgary
- Proportion: 1:2
- Adopted: 3 October 1983
- Design: A red field with white strips on the top and bottom and a stylized letter "C" and a cowboy hat slightly left-of-centre
- Designed by: Gwin Clarke and Yvonne Fritz

The official flag of Calgary features a cowboy hat and the letter "C" on a red field, with white strips on the top and bottom of the field. The flag was adopted in 1983 as a result of a contest. Gwynneth Llewellyn and Yvonne Fritz, a former Legislative Assembly of Alberta member, created the design.

The previous design of the flag was a field of white, with a red vertical band on the left third. Within the red band was the city's coat of arms. The white portion of the flag featured the text "Calgary" with maple leaves of the Flag of Canada above and below the text.

== Design and symbolism ==
=== First flag ===
Calgary's first flag featured a white field, with a red vertical band spanning the leftmost third of the flag. In the red band was a black letter "C" spanning the circumference of a vertically counterchanged version of the city's coat of arms, with the left half being white on black on red and the right half being black directly on the white. The "C" was half the height of the flag. To the right of the band was the text "Calgary" in all capital letters and a black, sans-serif font. Maple leaves like the one found on the Canadian national flag can be found above and below the text.

=== Second flag ===
The red field symbolizes the uniforms of the North-West Mounted Police. The flag's red and white colour scheme symbolizes hospitality and spirit. The white strips are both 3/32 the height of the flag. The large "C" is 11/16 the height of the flag and symbolizes the city's centennial, character, culture, charm, and the harmony between the city and its citizens. The "C" features a small outer ring around the circumference of the C. The Calgary White Hat located within the "C" symbolizes the history of rodeo within Calgary. It was deliberately placed inside the "C" to symbolize the people living inside the city.

Due to its colour scheme and use of a cowboy hat, the flag has been jokingly compared to the logo of the Arby's restaurant chain and is criticised for its simplicity.

== History ==
A contest was organized by the Centennial of Incorporation Committee, along with the city council. The winners were Gwin Clarke and Yvonne Fritz. Fritz later served in Alberta's Legislative Assembly for the Calgary-Cross district. It is assumed that the first design served until 3 October 1983, when it was replaced by the design which won the contest. The design was selected by Bruce Lee, one of the judges of the competition. In 2022, a new flag was proposed by John Vickers but was rejected by city council.

== Usage ==
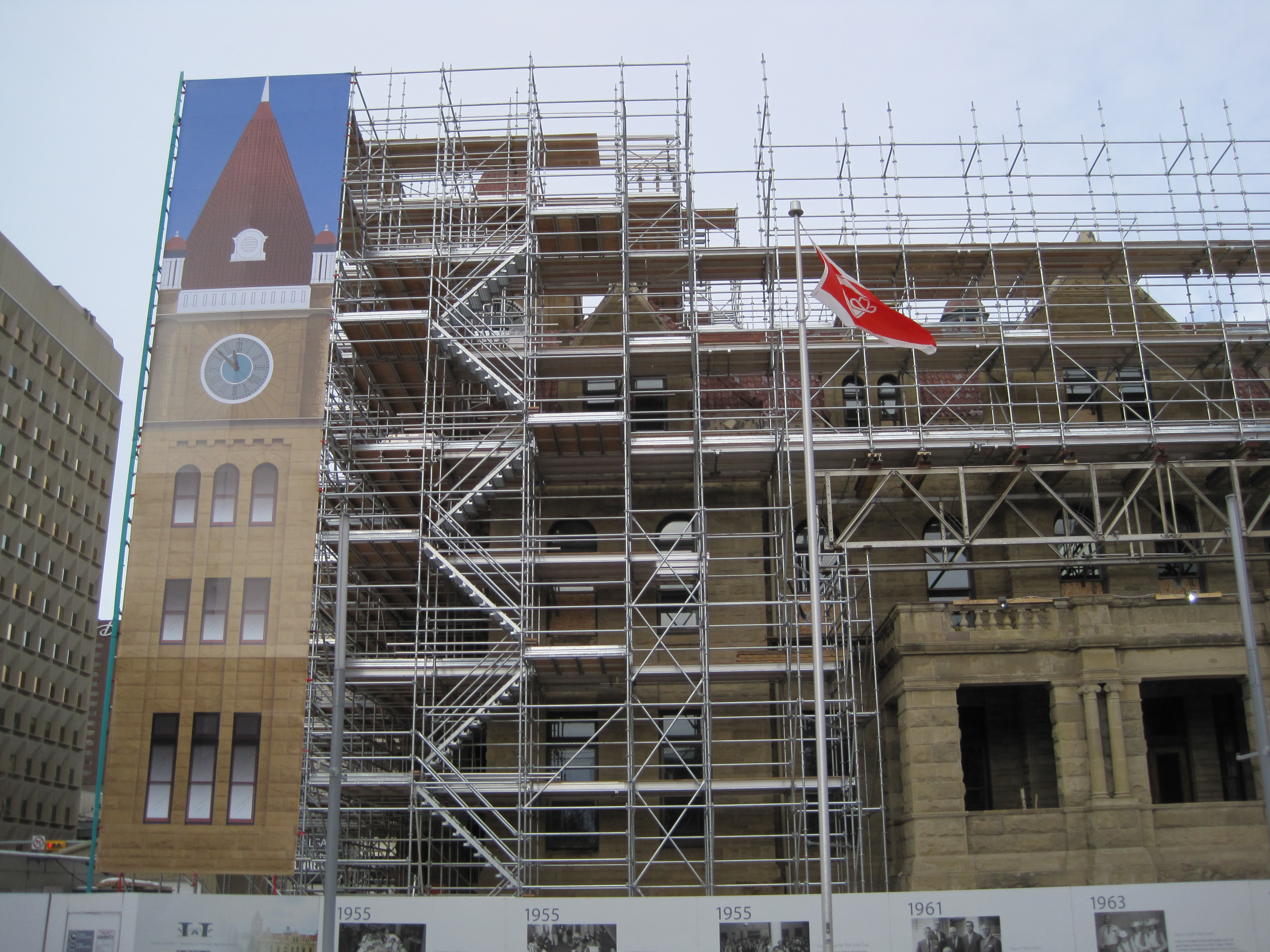
Flag flying at Calgary City Hall

The flag flies outside Calgary City Hall and flies in the Calgary City Council chamber, though the flag is present throughout the city.

== See also ==
- Coat of arms of Calgary
- Flag of Alberta
- Flag of Colorado, a similar distinctive "C" design for a state/province
- Flag of Edmonton
