= Calgary White Hat =

Variety of cowboy hat

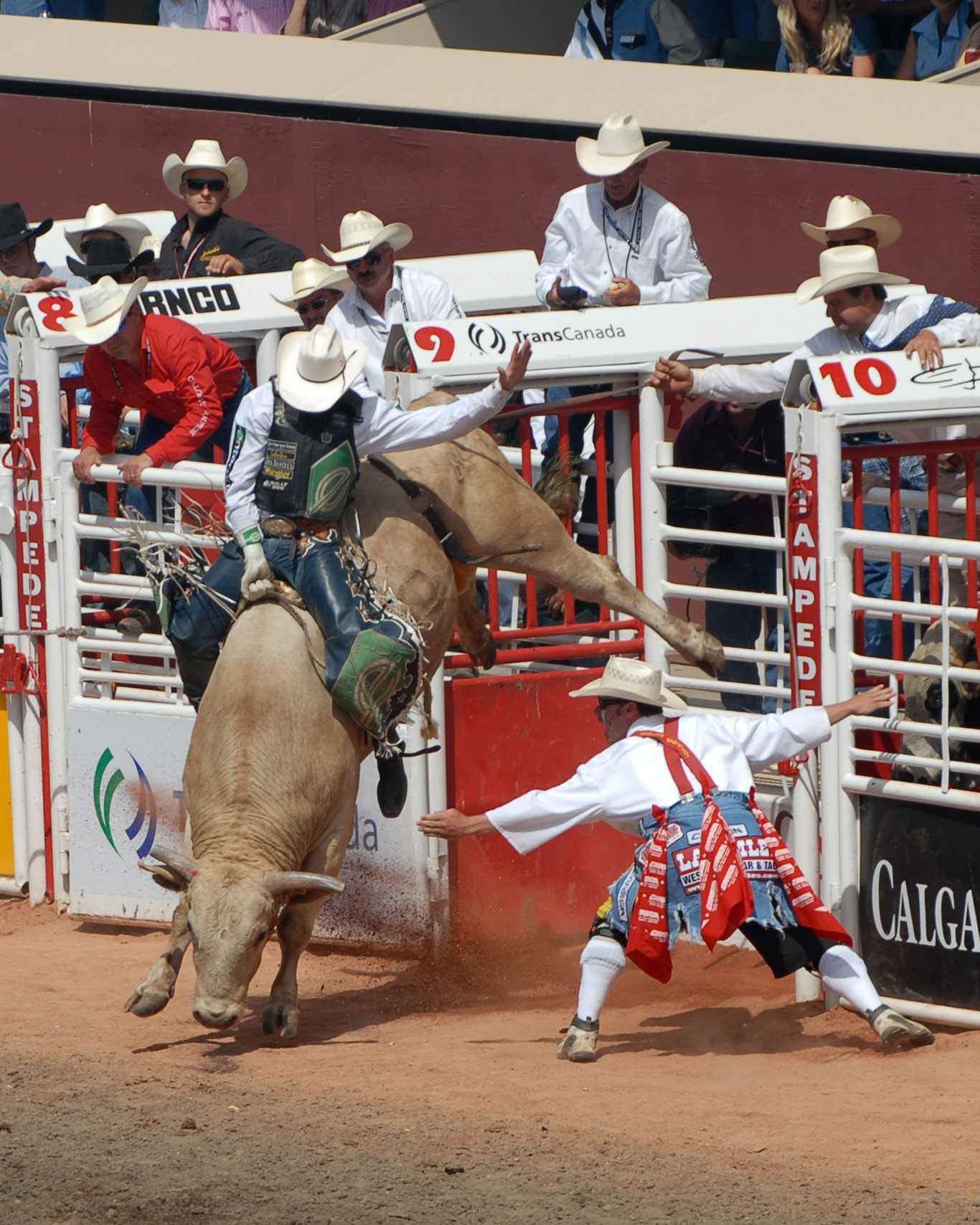
Participants in the bull riding event at the 2007 Calgary Stampede wear Calgary White Hats

The Calgary White Hat is a white felt cowboy hat which is the symbol of both the Calgary Stampede annual rodeo and the city of Calgary. Created by Morris Shumiatcher, owner of Smithbilt Hat Company, it was worn for the first time at the 1946 Stampede. In the early 1950s, Mayor of Calgary Donald Hugh Mackay began presenting the white hat to visiting dignitaries, a tradition that the mayor's office continues to this day. Thousands of tourists and groups also participate in "white hatting ceremonies" conducted by Tourism Calgary and by volunteer greeters at the Calgary International Airport. In 1983, the Calgary White Hat was incorporated into the design of the flag of Calgary.

== History ==
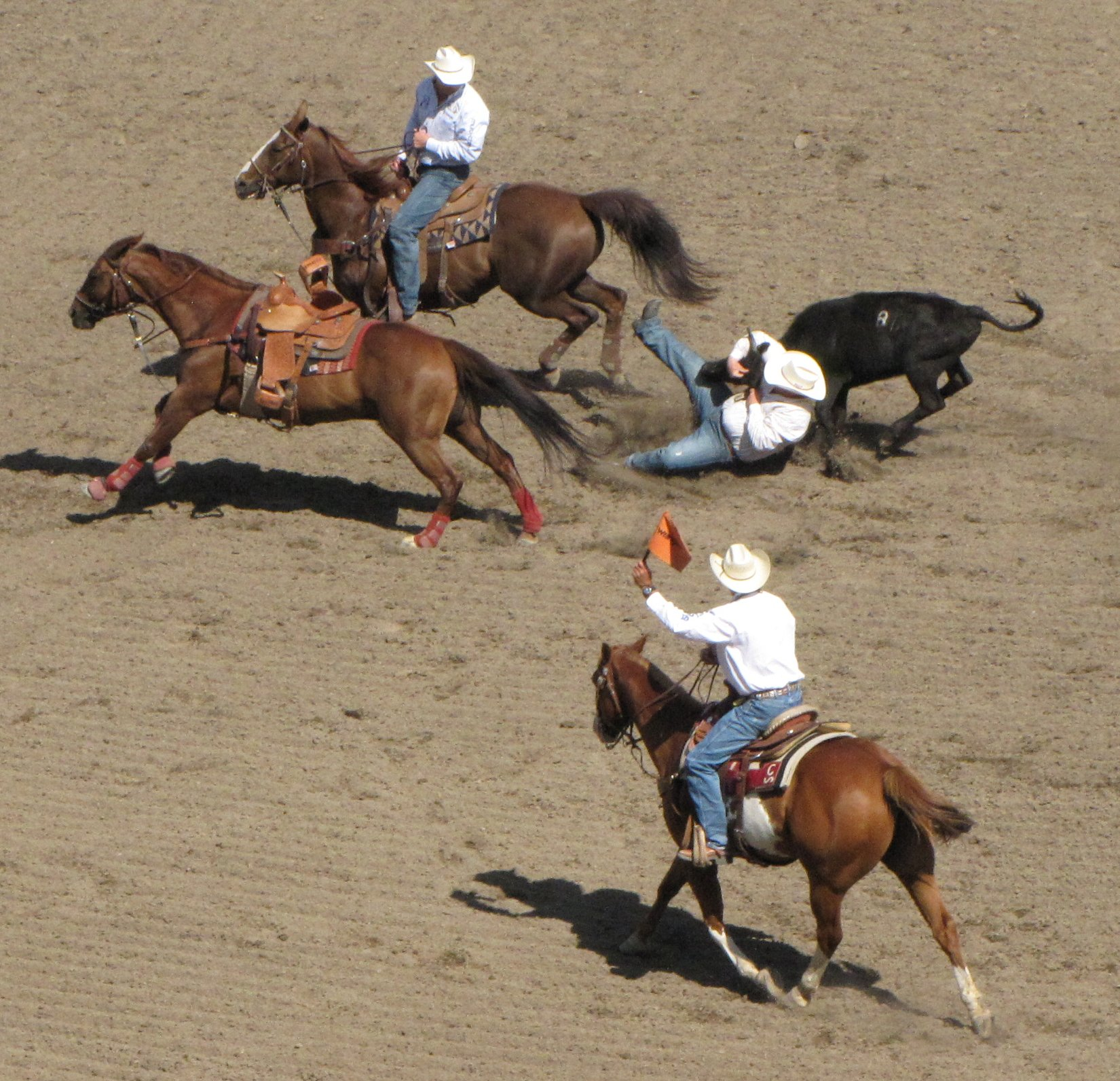
Steer wrestlers at the 2011 Calgary Stampede wearing Calgary White Hats

If you see somebody in a white cowboy hat in Toronto, you know immediately they're from Calgary.

–Don Wilson, past chairman and president of the Calgary Stampede

The Calgary White Hat was created by Morris Shumiatcher (1892–1958), a Russian-Jewish immigrant who came to Alberta with his father in 1909. His mother and ten other siblings joined them in Calgary in 1911. In 1919, Shumiatcher bought Calgary Hat Works, a hat cleaning and blocking firm, and turned it into Smithbilt Hat Company, which would manufacture and sell hats as well. The company operated retail stores in Alberta, Saskatchewan, and British Columbia.

Smithbilt initially produced fedoras, top hats, and bowler hats. In the 1940s, the board of the Calgary Stampede decided to encourage the wearing of cowboy hats at the annual rodeo and Shumiatcher sought to meet the demand. Though light pastel hats for men were then in vogue, Shumiatcher opted to manufacture a pure white cowboy hat. He imported the white felt from Russia through his Jewish contacts there who were tailors and hat makers, and produced 18 white hats in 1946. William Herron, a local rancher and oilman who often won the best costume prize in the Calgary Stampede parade, purchased four of them for himself and his family members, and the rest sold out in a day. In 1947, Shumiatcher produced 240 white hats for the Stampede, which also sold out. (Note: According to another version of the story, Herron was the one who sought a hat maker who would create a white felt cowboy hat to go with the parade costumes his wife was sewing for the Calgary Stampede of 1947. Shumiatcher agreed to take on the project and imported the white felt from Russia through his contacts there. Herron ordered 144 white hats for his family and friends, won the best costume prize, and set off a fashion craze for Smithbilt white cowboy hats at the Stampede.)

In 1948, 250 Calgary Stampeders fans wore their Smithbilt white hats to the 36th Grey Cup championship in Toronto. Many gave their hats to Torontonians whom they befriended; one gave a hat to the mayor. The 1948 Grey Cup event caused the Calgary White Hat to be regarded as a symbol of the city's hospitality.

== White hatting ceremony ==
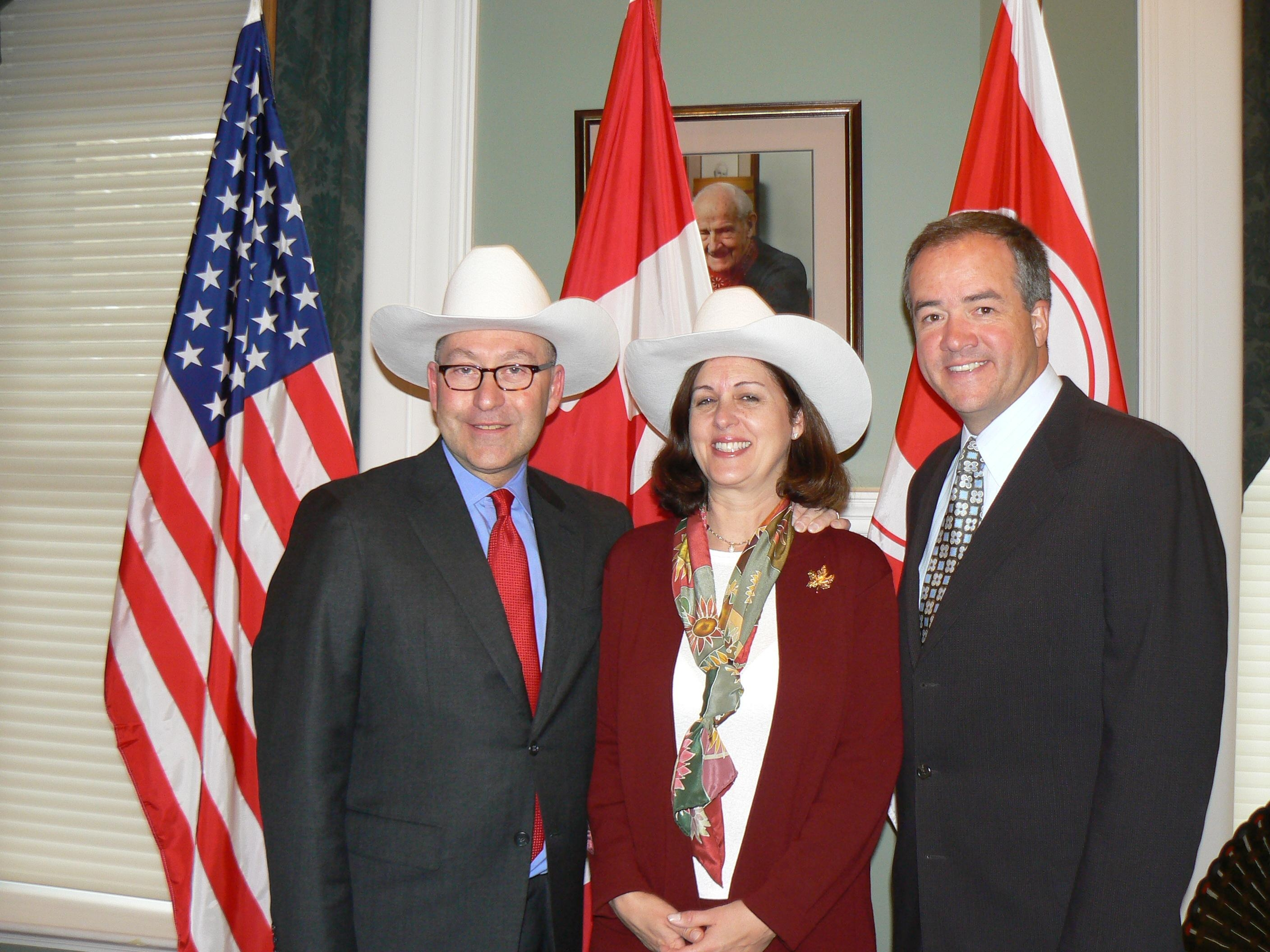
(L. to r.) United States Ambassador to Canada David Jacobson and his wife are "white hatted" by Calgary mayor Dave Bronconnier during their first visit to Alberta, 2009

In 1950, newly elected mayor of Calgary Donald Hugh Mackay, who had been part of the 1948 Grey Cup excursion, initiated the practice of presenting a Smithbilt white hat to every visiting dignitary. City Council aldermen increasingly grew uncomfortable with the practice, which they viewed as a show: Alderman P.N.R. Morrison protested that "The white hats undermine efforts to establish Calgary as an oil and industrial centre", and Alderman Grant MacEwan said, "The presentations have been carried to a foolish extreme". In 1958, the City Council voted to limit the number of mayoral hat-giving ceremonies to 15 per year. Mackay responded by launching a White Hat Fund with the help of local businessmen; the white hatting ceremony was eventually taken over by Tourism Calgary.

The mayor's white hatting ceremony is considered the equivalent of bestowing the keys to the city. The mayor's office conducts 15 to 25 white hatting ceremonies per year; among its recipients have been Queen Elizabeth II and William and Catherine, the Duke and Duchess of Cambridge; world leaders Vladimir Putin, Tony Blair, Bill Clinton, and George W. Bush; the Dalai Lama, Pope John Paul II, and Governor General of Canada Michaëlle Jean; and entertainers Bob Dylan, Ozzy and Sharon Osbourne, David Lee Roth, Luciano Pavarotti, Oprah Winfrey, and Mickey Mouse.

In 1969, Prince Philip, Duke of Edinburgh, tolerated the white hatting faux pas of new mayor Rod Sykes when Sykes, who had not received the message that the Duke already possessed two Calgary White Hats from previous visits, welcomed the arriving royal with a white hat. Philip muttered, "Not another one". Then he remarked, "You must give out dozens of these things. ... I can always use it for carrying water around ... or to put flowers in when I get home".

Today, thousands of white hatting ceremonies are conducted annually by Tourism Calgary and by volunteer greeters at Calgary International Airport. Tourism Calgary conducts white hatting ceremonies for groups and organizations. In September 2012, for example, 900 attendees to the Airport Council International-North America annual conference participated in a white hatting ceremony in which they also received certificates naming them as honorary citizens of the city.

The white hatting ceremony for individual tourists and groups arriving at the airport began in 1991 with a staff of 45 volunteers; by 2016, that number had increased to more than 440 volunteers. Between 1991 and 2016, the airport greeters conducted close to 4,000 white hatting ceremonies for more than 12,520 visitors. Any individual or group can order a white hatting ceremony at the airport; they must purchase a new, white hat in advance or bring one with them. The airport greeters, outfitted in white shirts, red vests, and Calgary White Hats, also answer questions and provide directions and assistance to travelers.

As part of the white hatting ceremony conducted for tourists and groups, recipients are asked to recite the following oath:

"I/we, havin' pleasured ourselves in the only genuine cowtown in Canada, namely Calgary, Alberta and havin' been duly exposed to exceptional amounts of heart warmin', hand shakin', foot stompin', down home, country style Western Spirit, do promise to share this here brand of Western Hospitality with all folks and critters who cross our path". The one leading the oath adds, "On the count of three, raise your hat and shout a big ole' Calgary 'YAHOO!!!'"

The "YAHOO!!!" shout echoes the traditional cowboy call heard at the Calgary Stampede.

== Description ==
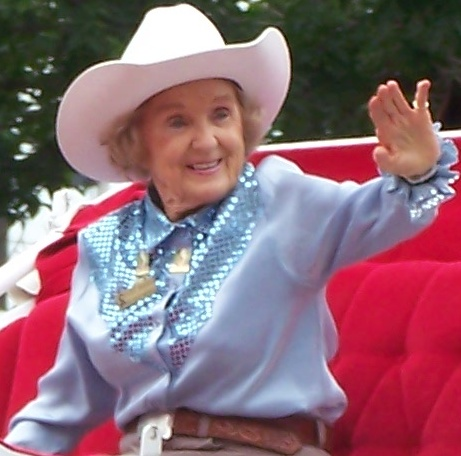
Patsy Rodgers, the first Stampede Queen in 1946, is seen here as the 2008 Stampede Parade Marshal

Smithbilt Hats, the official hat maker for the Calgary Stampede, produces the Calgary White Hat in straw, canvas, Merino wool, and 100% rabbit fur. The straw and canvas models are typically selected by tourists, with a retail price of around CAD$25 per hat, while the rabbit fur felt model, at CAD$225, is the one presented to visiting dignitaries by the mayor. The brim of the hat is wide and curved. The brim is made narrower for women's hats. Because of its shape, the Calgary White Hat does not lend itself to variety in customization. However, Smithbilt does measure and adjust its high-end models per customer preference. The company offers a custom-designed hat box. Hat stiffening and renovation services are also available. The company notes, "If you spill your whiskey on your hat, rinse the spot immediately and brush it with your finger. Let the hat dry out naturally. Do the same for yourself".

As of 2009, white hats accounted for approximately one-quarter of Smithbilt's annual sales, with yearly sales figures of 20,000 handmade wool and fur hats and 40,000 imported straw models. A white hat is also worn by each year's Calgary Stampede Queen in place of a crown; she and her ladies in waiting decorate their hats with jewels and pins. Calgary White Hats were worn by the Canadian Olympic team at the opening ceremony of the 1988 Winter Olympics in Calgary.

== Flag of Calgary ==
In 1983, the city held a contest to design a new flag. The winning entry depicts a red field bordered by horizontal white stripes across the top and bottom. The emblem on the field is a large white "C" encasing a Calgary White Hat. Among other things, the "C" represents the city of Calgary, as does the white hat.

== White Hat Awards ==
In 1962, Tourism Calgary inaugurated the White Hat Awards to recognize individual achievements in the city's tourism industry. In 2016, 650 individuals were nominated in 20 categories. The 56th annual awards ceremony is scheduled for May 16, 2018. 1989 White Hatter of the Year went to professional singer/entertainer, Molly Hamilton, affectionately known as "Miss Molly". This award is given to the one person in Calgary who best demonstrated the warm and western hospitality of the city.

== See also ==
- List of hat styles

== Sources ==
- Byfield, Virginia; Bunner, Paul (2002). Alberta in the 20th Century: The sixties revolution and the fall of social credit. United Western Publications. ISBN 0973076003.
- Esrock, Robin (2013). The Great Canadian Bucket List: One-of-a-Kind Travel Experiences. Dundurn.com. ISBN 978-1459723085.
- Jewish Historical Society of Southern Alberta (1996). Land of Promise: The Jewish Experience in Southern Alberta. The Society. ISBN 1-55056-457-9.
- Joffe, Jay; Fischbein, Maxine (2007). A Joyful Harvest: Celebrating the Jewish Contribution to Southern Alberta Life, 1889–2005. Jewish Historical Society of Southern Alberta. ISBN 978-0978247805.
- Hamblin, Jennifer (2014). Calgary's Stampede Queens. Rocky Mountain Books. ISBN 978-1771600033.
- Marshall, Andy (2016). Thin Power: How former Calgary Mayor Rod Sykes stamped his brand on the city . . . And scorched some sacred cows. FriesenPress. ISBN 978-1460283974.
- Warrender, Susan (2003). Alberta Titans: From Rags to Riches During Alberta's Pioneer Days. Heritage House Publishing Co. ISBN 1551539837.
