= Flag of Yukon =

Yukon
- Use: Civil and state flag
- Proportion: 1:2
- Adopted: March 1, 1968; 58 years ago
- Design: A blue, white and green Canadian pale tricolour with the coat of arms of Yukon at the centre, above a wreath of fireweed
- Use: Flag of the Commissioner of Yukon

The flag of Yukon is a green, white, and blue tricolour with the coat of arms of Yukon at the centre above a wreath of fireweed, the territorial flower. An official flag for Yukon was created during the 1960s, a decade in which the national flag of Canada was chosen, as well as several other provincial flags. The flag of Yukon was officially selected from a territory-wide design competition in 1967, with the winning design adopted on March 1, 1968.

== History ==
The flag of Yukon was officially adopted on March 1, 1968. The flag was chosen from a territory-wide competition as part of Canada's Centennial celebrations of 1967. The competition was sponsored by the Whitehorse branch of the Royal Canadian Legion. A C$100 prize was offered to the winning design. There were a total of 137 submissions with the winning design coming from Yukon College graduate Lynn Lambert. Lambert submitted 10 designs of which one made the final three designs as selected by a committee, with his eventually being named the winner. A prototype design was sent to Ottawa for suitable heraldic description. An expert in Ottawa sent back an amended version of the submitted flag design. The committee in Whitehorse however kept with the original design. The flag was adopted by the 'Flag Act' on December 1, 1967.

=== Symbolism ===
The flag is divided into three coloured panels:

- green representing Yukon's forests
- white representing snow
- blue representing Yukon's lakes and rivers

In the centre of the white panel is the Coat of Arms of Yukon above a wreath of fireweed, the floral emblem of the Yukon. The crest of the Coat of Arms is a Malamute sled dog, a common work dog in the Yukon, standing on a mound of snow. The shield of the Coat of Arms contains at the top, a cross of St. George for England with a roundel with a pattern of vair (fur), called Roundel in Vair. Below in the middle of the shield are two wavy lines representing Yukon's rivers on a blue background. Finally at the bottom of the shield are two red triangles representing Yukon's mountains with gold circles in them representing the Yukon's great mineral resources.

=== Technical description ===
The flag of Yukon has a flag ratio of 1:2, equivalent to the flag of Canada. The centre white panel is larger by one and a half times the width of each of the other two panels, for a pale ratio of 1 to 1.5 to 1.

=== Terminology ===
In flag terminology, the flag is a tricolour, meaning it has three colours, in approximately equal size. However, it may not be considered a true tricolour as it is defaced, containing the coat of arms of Yukon, where a true tricolour contains no additional symbols.

== See also ==
- Symbols of Yukon
- Coat of arms of Yukon
