= Canadian Duality Flag =

Unofficial Canadian flag

The flag adds blue lining stripes to the red flag of Canada to represent the unity of Canadian francophones (blue) and anglophones (red).

The Canadian Duality Flag (French: Drapeau de la dualité canadienne; also called the Canadian Unity Flag) is an unofficial flag that was originally circulated to demonstrate the unity of Canada during the lead-up to the 1995 Quebec referendum, at rallies for the "no" side. The Duality Flag design was chosen to represent explicitly the Francophone and Anglophone populations on the national flag by adding blue stripes to the red sections, roughly in proportion to the number of Canadians who are primarily French-speaking. The blue was chosen as it is the main colour that is used on the flag of Quebec.

== See also ==
- Flag of Canada
- Flag of Quebec
