= Flag of Dayton, Ohio =

Dayton, Ohio
- Use: Civil flag
- Proportion: 3:5
- Adopted: December 15, 2021
- Designed by: Catapult Creative
- Use: Official pennant
- Adopted: August 15, 1917

The flag of Dayton, Ohio, was adopted on December 15, 2021, and created by Dayton design and marketing firm Catapult Creative. The cost to the city for the design and an accompanying video was $4,300 (equivalent to $5,100 in 2025).

== Design ==
The design was partly inspired by the wings of the Wright Flyer, keeping with the theme of including the flyer on the flag, but incorporated the idea in an abstract way. Bands at 19.5° break the flag into three sections in a direction from hoist side to fly side. The bottom hoist side features a green band to the edge representing Dayton's nickname as the "Gem City" and to "showcase our reputation [...] as a community centered on grit and tenacity." A dark blue band starting at 1/2 the length of the canton to with the bottom edge of the band terminating at the bottom corner of the fly side represents the water ways of Dayton. The top third features a pattern of light blue and partial white stripes where the light blue represents the sky, and the partial stripes creates a pattern of five bars for the five rivers in the Dayton area.

Flag design ideas were submitted by the public, including 10% from Dayton Public Schools where Cleveland Elementary submitted the largest numbers as identified by the Mayor's office. Design ideas were reviewed by a committee to select seven final designs, and the City Commission selected the final three. Catapult Creative was hired to survey the public for their opinions on the final designs and then create a flag using that feedback.

== History ==
=== Griep flag ===
Flag of Dayton (1917–1958)

Dayton adopted its first flag on August 15, 1917. It was a vertical triband divided into two vertical bands of deep orange on either side and a larger band of white down the middle. The middle band contained a navy blue silhouette of a Wright Flyer encircled in rings of orange and navy blue, representing the globe. The name "DAYTON" was inscribed within the rings in navy blue. The flag was designed the previous year by Mabel Griep, an assistant art teacher at Steele High School who was childhood friends with Katharine Wright, sister of the Wright brothers. According to Griep, the blue represented loyalty, the white represented civic righteousness, and orange represented agricultural resources.

The same city ordinance that specified the flag also specified a city pennant, similarly a triband of deep orange and white. The white band contained the name "DAYTON", set in navy blue lettering decreasing in size from mast to fly.

=== Spahr–Kress flag ===
Flag of Dayton (June 11, 1958–December 15, 2021)

On January 23, 1956, the Dayton Area Chamber of Commerce urged the city commission to consider replacing the flag, then held a contest to choose the replacement in 1958. On June 11, 1958, a six-person committee selected a combination of two designs by Michael J. Spahr and Karen Kress. It commemorated the Wright brothers, who lived in Dayton. The flag was set against a royal blue field. It featured a royal blue Wright Flyer superimposed on a gray globe with white graticule lines, representing the aviation industry's global reach. The globe was surrounded by a white cogwheel, representing Dayton as a manufacturing hub. The name "DAYTON" was inscribed along the mast in white, slab serif lettering.

=== 2021 redesign ===
In 2018, Mayor Nan Whaley convened a committee to replace the flag after hearing a TED talk by Roman Mars. From October 1 to December 9, 2019, the 20-person committee received 312 proposals mostly from residents of the Miami Valley area. The committee required submissions to have a proportion of 1:1.67 and adhere to the North American Vexillological Association's five principles of flag design. In 2020, the city commission and mayor selected three finalists. The three finalists were Elizabeth Adams, Cecelia Freeman and Larry Collins. Based on public feedback, either one of the finalists would be selected as the new flag, or a graphic designer would incorporate the finalists' designs into a new design.

Elizabeth Adam's design

Cecelia Freeman's design

Larry Collins' design

The winning design, which ended up not being one of the three finalists, was revealed on December 15, 2021. The previous flag was redesignated as the "flag emeritus".

== Usage ==
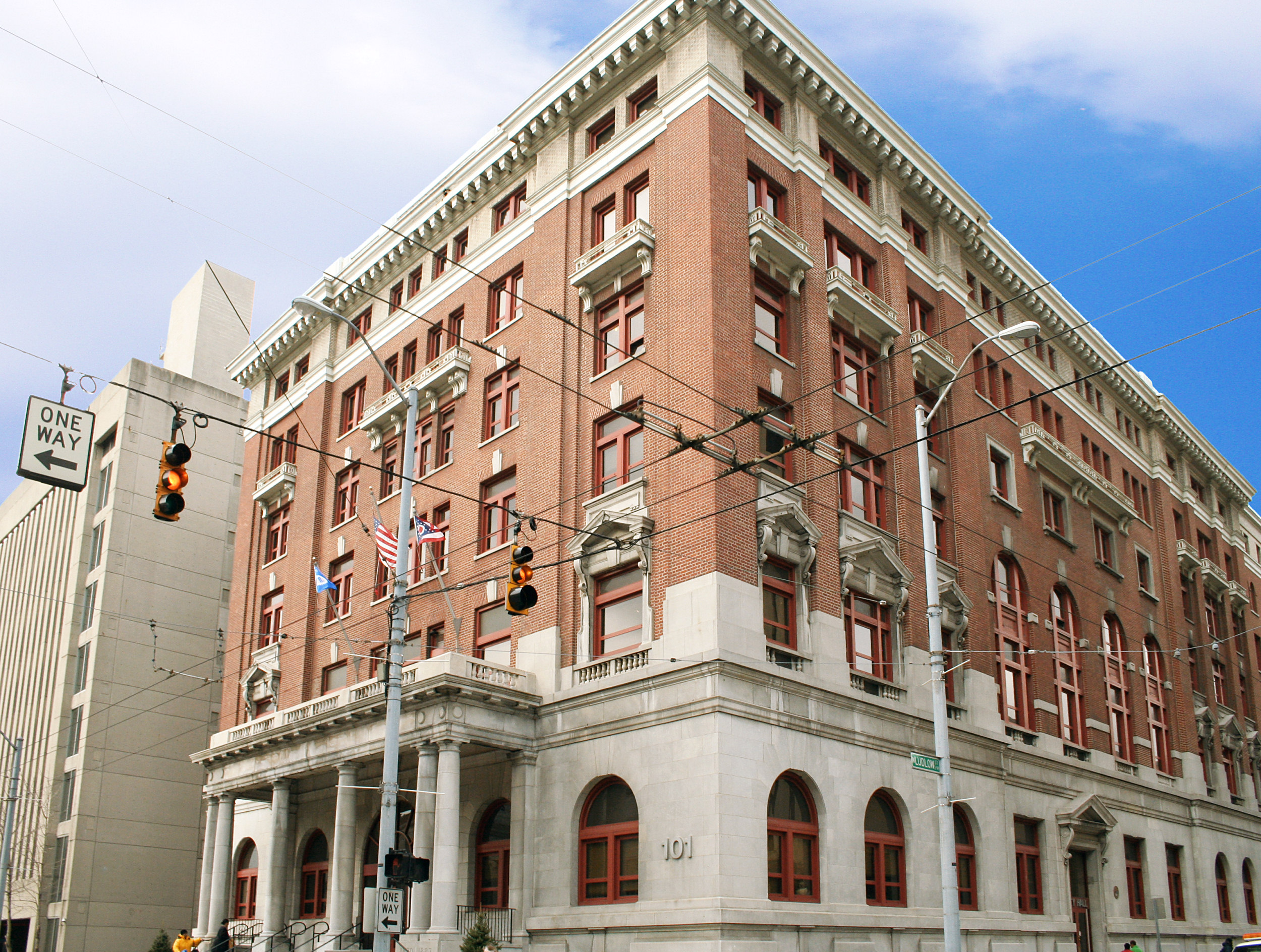
The flag emeritus flies outside Dayton City Hall to the left of the U.S. flag.

Dayton's flag flies outside several public institutions, including City Hall and the Dayton Metro Library's main library.

== Similar flags ==
The flag of surrounding Montgomery County also features a Wright Flyer.
