= Coat of arms of Yukon =

Canadian territorial heraldic symbol

Arms of Yukon

Versions
- Badge of the Commissioner
- Armiger: Yukon
- Adopted: 1956
- Crest: A husky statant on a mount of snow proper;
- Shield: Azure two pallets wavy Argent between two piles reversed Gules fimbriated Argent, each charged with two bezants, on a chief Argent a cross Gules surmounted by a roundel Vair;

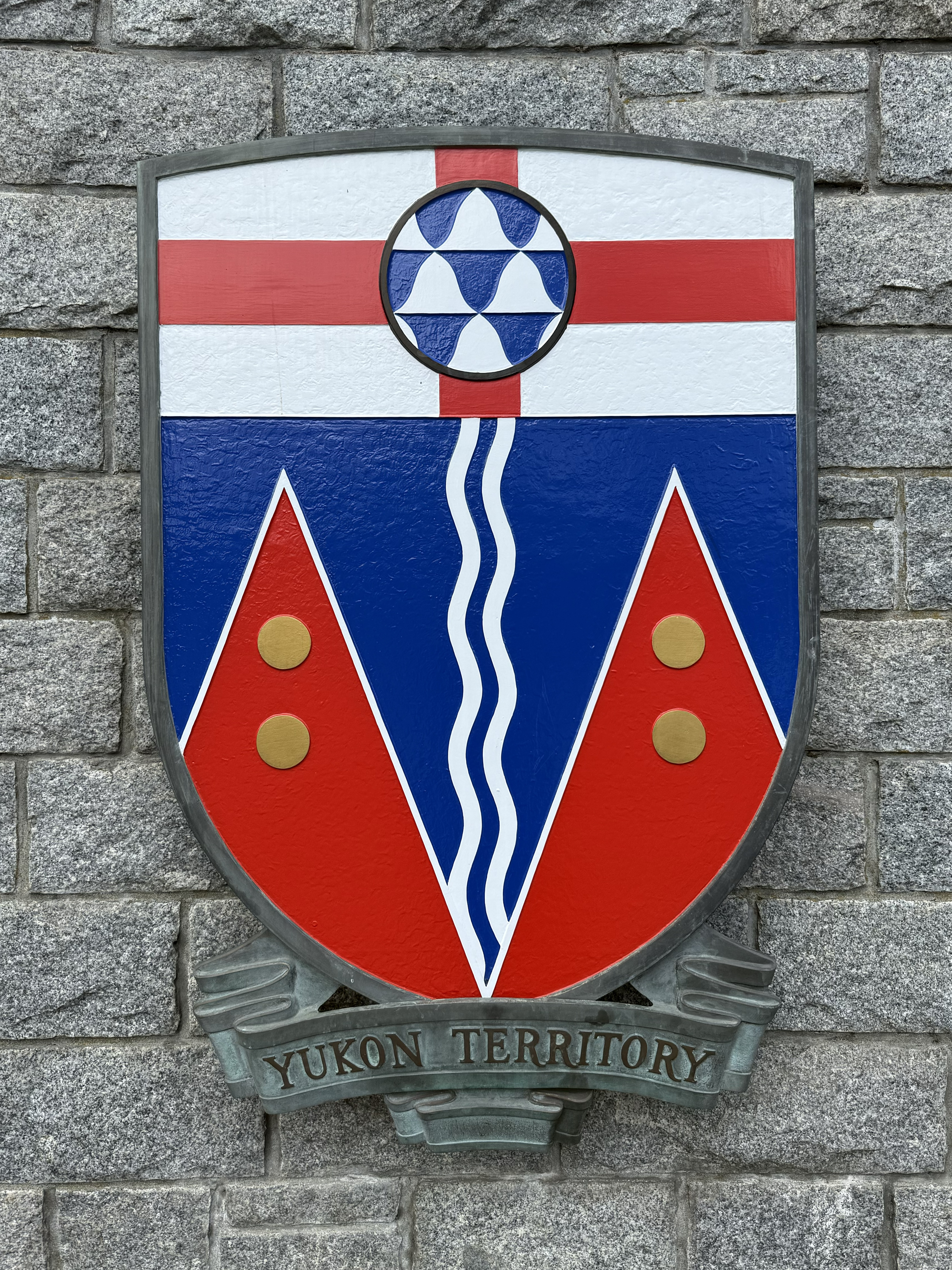
Shield of the Yukon Territory

The coat of arms of Yukon is the heraldic symbol representing the Canadian territory of Yukon. The arms was commissioned by the federal Department of Indian Affairs and Northern Development and designed by well-known heraldry expert Alan Beddoe in the early 1950s. It was officially approved by Queen Elizabeth II in 1956.

The lower part of the shield represents Yukon's mountains, with the gold disks (called "bezants," a medieval gold coin) representing the territory's mineral resources and its birth in the Klondike Gold Rush. The two white wavy lines represent the territory's rivers.

The red cross in chief represents England. The roundel surmounting it is in a pattern called vair (i.e. squirrel fur), representing the territory's wealth of fur-bearing animals.

The crest is an Alaskan Malamute dog standing on a mound of snow.

== Blazon ==
Shield: Azure, on a pallet wavy Argent, a like pallet of the field, issuant from base two piles reversed Gules, fimbriated also Argent, each charged with two bezants in pale, on a chief Argent a cross Gules, surmounted of a roundel vair.

Crest: On a wreath Or and Gules, standing on a mound of snow Proper, an Alaskan Malamute statant Proper.

== See also ==
- Symbols of Yukon
- Flag of Yukon
