= Flag of Hamilton, Ontario =

Canadian municipal flag

Flag of Hamilton
- Adopted: July 15, 2003
- Design: Triband with a Canadian pale at the centre
- Designed by: Bishop Ralph Spence

The flag of Hamilton was designed by Anglican bishop Ralph Spence and granted to the city on July 15, 2003.

The flag was specially designed to complement the Canadian flag being a triband with a Canadian pale at centre. The colours are yellow and royal blue. In the centre is a golden yellow cinquefoil which, as the badge of Clan Hamilton, represents the city's name. The chain on the outside symbolizes both unity and the community's steel industry. The six links in the chain represent the city's six communities: Hamilton, Ancaster, Dundas, Flamborough, Glanbrook, and Stoney Creek.

== Description ==
On a field golden yellow a Canadian pale royal blue charged with a cinquefoil encircled by a chain of six large and six small links alternated, all golden yellow.
