= Flag of Alberta =

Canadian provincial flag

Alberta
- Use: Civil and state flag
- Proportion: 1:2
- Adopted: June 1, 1968; 58 years ago
- Design: An ultramarine blue field with the escutcheon of the Alberta coat of arms in the centre.

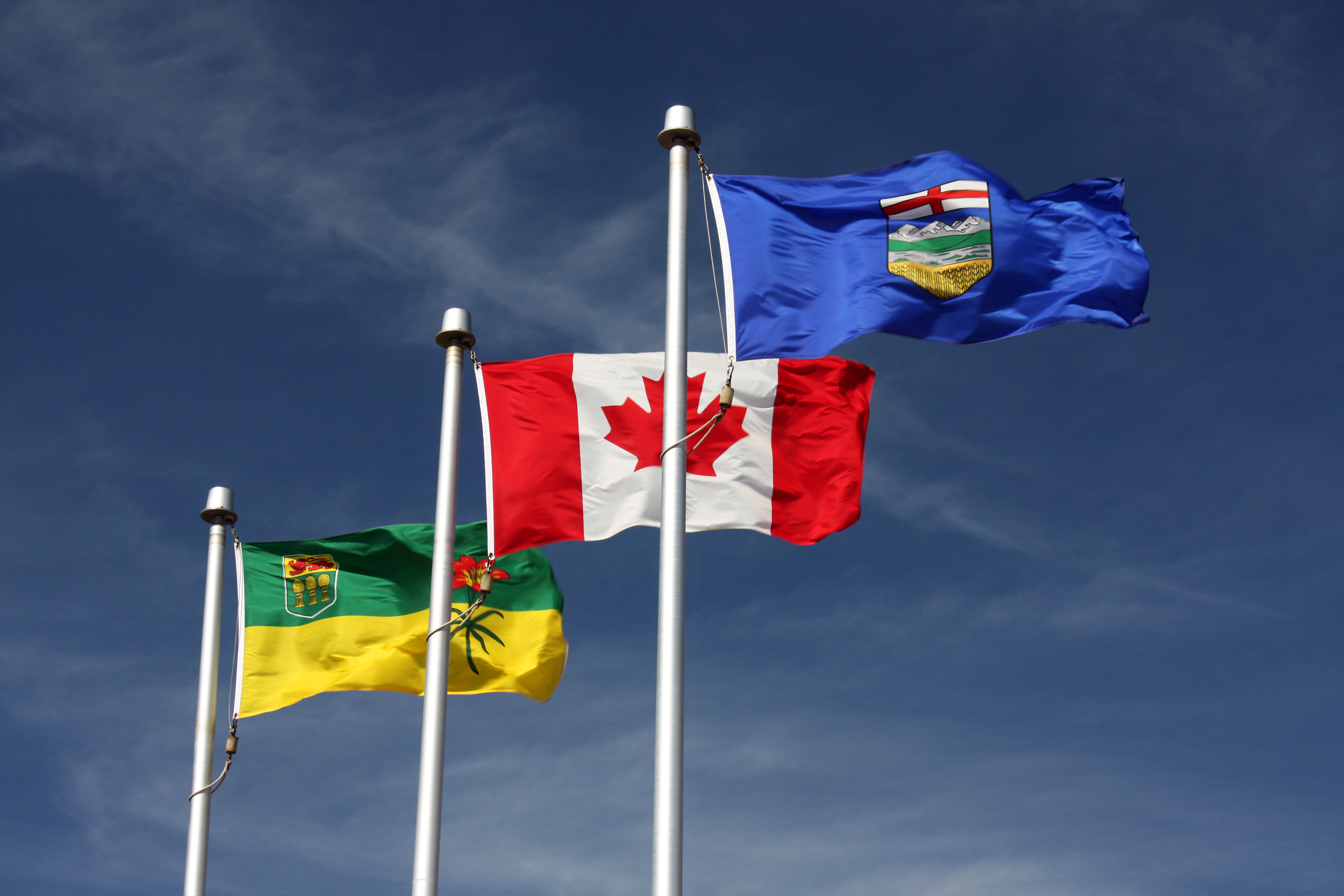
The flag of Alberta flying alongside the flags of Saskatchewan and Canada in Lloydminster

The flag of Alberta is an official symbol of the province of Alberta, Canada. In 1968, the provincial legislature authorized the design of a flag, adopting it on June 1, 1968. The flag has the proportions 1:2, with the provincial coat of arms in the centre of an ultramarine blue background. The shield's height is 7/11 that of the flag's height.

The provincial colours, adopted in 1984, are blue and gold (deep yellow); they are also referred to as "Alberta blue" and "Alberta gold", appearing on the flag/shield in the sky/background and wheat background, respectively.

In 2001, a survey conducted by the North American Vexillological Association (NAVA) placed the Alberta provincial flag 35th in design quality out of the 72 Canadian provincial, U.S. state, and U.S. territory flags ranked. Out of all Canadian flags, only those of Ontario and Manitoba ranked lower.

== Design ==
The flag is the shield of the Coat of arms of Alberta on an ultramarine field, and is in a 1:2 ratio. The shield represents the natural resources and beauty of the varied Alberta landscape: the Rocky Mountains and their foothills, the grass prairies, and the cultivated wheat fields. St George's Cross is an allusion to the arms of the Hudson's Bay Company, which once asserted exclusive trading rights in what is now Alberta. By the original flag act that introduced the flag, the shield "shall extend to seven-elevenths of the width of the flag".

=== Colours ===
Scheme	Blue	White	Red	Grey	Green	Yellow
Pantone (Paper)	661 C	White	1788 C	Cool Gray 4 C	349 C	106 C
Web colours	#003594	#FFFFFF	#EE2737	#BBBCBC	#046A38	#F9E547
RGB	0, 53, 148	255, 255, 255	238, 39, 55	187, 188, 188	4, 106, 56	249, 229, 71
CMYK	100%, 64%, 0%, 42%	0%, 0%, 0%, 0%	0%, 84%, 77%, 7%	1%, 0%, 0%, 26%	96%, 0%, 47%, 58%	0%, 8%, 71%, 2%

The shade of ultramarine specified by the original flag act is Canadian Standard paint colour blue 202-101, but the shade used in practice seems to vary significantly. It appears to be specified as the same shade of blue as the flag of the Northwest Territories. With the design being a simple shield on blue, it has been likened to the much-maligned design used on many state flags in the neighbouring United States.

== History ==
Shield of Alberta

A royal warrant of King Edward VII granted the original arms, consisting of only the shield, on 30 May 1907. The origin of the design is credited to a Mrs. H. MacCully. The upper part of the shield features the red cross of Saint George. The lower portion of the shield depicts the Rocky Mountains, grass prairies, and wheat fields – representing Alberta's landscape.

Around the time of the upcoming centennial celebration of Canadian Confederation petitions were submitted in November 1966 to Premier Ernest Charles Manning by the Social Credit Women's Auxiliaries of the Alberta Social Credit League to give Alberta its own unique flag. The flag was designed and approved as the official provincial flag by the Alberta legislature on June 1, 1968. The flag act states the design as "A blue flag with the shield of the armorial ensigns of the Province centered thereon (as more particularly described in section 3) is hereby appointed and declared as the Flag of Alberta". Section 3 more specifically says:

1. The Flag shall be of the proportions two by length and one by width.
2. The blue of the Flag shall be a shade of blue conforming with the Canadian Government Specifications Board, Specification 1-GP-12c-P.II,1965: Standard paint colour — blue 202-101.
3. The shield centred on the Flag shall extend to seven-elevenths of the width of the Flag.

This information was largely repeated and not expounded on in the Emblems of Alberta Act (1980).

The Calgary Flames used the flag as a shoulder patch on their home and away uniforms from 2007 to 2020.

== Flag of Lieutenant Governor ==
Flag of Lieutenant governor of Alberta

The Lieutenant Governor of Alberta's symbol features the shield of Alberta surrounded by golden Canadian maple leaves and a royal crown on top. This is shown on the flag of the lieutenant governor on a field of royal blue. The flag is flown from the roof of the Alberta Legislature Building when the lieutenant governor is in residence, alongside the provincial flag, the Canadian flag, and the Union Jack. The Governor General of Canada approved the flag in 1981.

According to the official guidelines, the flag is not to be flown inside a building when the Lieutenant Governor is on the premises of the legislature building. It is never to be flown on or inside a church and never to be lowered to half-mast. On the death of a Lieutenant Governor, while in office, the flag is taken down until a successor is sworn in. The Lieutenant Governor's flag "has precedence" over all other flags in Alberta, except for the Royal flags of Canada and the Governor General's Flag. However, upon the occasion of a visit by either a royal dignitary or the governor general, their flag does not replace the lieutenant governor's in the legislature building. The Lieutenant governor's flag has precedence over any member of the Royal Family except for The King.

== Gallery ==
Flag of the lieutenant governor of Alberta (1907–1981)

Flag of Franco-Albertans

== See also ==
- List of Canadian provincial and territorial symbols
- Coat of arms of Alberta
- Symbols of Alberta

== Sources ==
- Franco, Guida (2006). Canadian Almanac & Directory 2006. Toronto: Micromedia ProQuest. ISBN 1-895021-90-1.
