= Coat of arms of Alberta =

Heraldic symbol of the Canadian province

Arms of His Majesty The King in Right of Alberta

Versions
- Escutcheon-only

- For use by the Lieutenant Governor of Alberta
- Armiger: Charles III in Right of Alberta
- Adopted: 1907, augmented 1980, 2008
- Crest: Upon a Helm with a Wreath Argent and Gules a Beaver couchant upholding on its back the Royal Crown both proper.
- Shield: Azure, in front of a range of snow mountains proper a range of hills Vert, in base a wheat field surmounted by a prairie both also proper, on a chief Argent a St. George's cross.
- Supporters: On the dexter side a Lion Or armed and langued Gules and on the sinister side a Pronghorn (Antilocapra americana) proper.
- Compartment: Compartment : Comprising a grassy mount with the Floral Emblem of the Said Province of Alberta, the Wild Rose (Rosa acicularis), growing therefrom proper.
- Motto: FORTIS ET LIBER; Strong and Free

The coat of arms of the province of Alberta contains symbols reflecting Alberta's English heritage along with local symbols. The upper part of the shield features the red cross of Saint George. The lower portion of the shield depicts the Rocky Mountains, grass prairies, and wheat fields – representing Alberta's landscape.

A royal warrant of King Edward VII granted the original arms, consisting of only the shield, on 30 May 1907. The arms were further augmented with supporters, a crest, and motto, by royal warrant of Queen Elizabeth II on 30 July 1980.

The shield, on a plain blue field, features in Alberta's provincial flag.

== History ==
On 30 July 1980, Queen Elizabeth II augmented the armorial bearings by Royal Warrant with a crest, supporters, and a motto. The helmet under the crest was changed from a steel helmet to a gold royal helmet on 15 January 2008.

== Symbolism ==
Crest
The crest sits above the shield and consists of a royal helmet crowned with a red and silver wreath, on top of which sits a beaver, resting on top of which is St Edward's Crown. White and red are the official national colours of Canada, and the beaver is the official animal of Canada.
Shield
The shield represents the natural resources and beauty of the varied Alberta landscape: the Rocky Mountains and their foothills, the grass prairies, and the cultivated wheat fields. St George's Cross is an allusion to the arms of the Hudson's Bay Company, which once controlled what is now Alberta.
Compartment
The compartment or base is a grassy mount with wild roses, the official flower of Alberta.
Supporters
The supporters sit on either side of the shield and consist of a golden lion on the left (representing power) and a pronghorn on the right (representing Alberta's natural resources). Neither of these is the official animal of Alberta (which is the bighorn sheep).
Motto
Fortis et Liber, meaning "strong and free", a phrase from the English lyrics of "O Canada".

== See also ==
- Symbols of Alberta
- Canadian heraldry
- National symbols of Canada
- List of Canadian provincial and territorial symbols
- Heraldry
