= Lists of Brazil state symbols =

The states and federal district of Brazil have representative symbols that are recognized by their state legislative assemblies. While all states have official flags, coats of arms, and anthems, some states have officially designated additional state symbols such as trees, flowers, and animals.

== Lists by state and federal district ==
- Ceará
- Goiás
- Espírito Santo
- Mato Grosso
- Mato Grosso do Sul
- Piauí
- Rio Grande do Norte
- Rio Grande do Sul
- Rondônia
- São Paulo
- Santa Catarina
- Sergipe
- Tocantins

== See also ==
- National symbol
  - National symbols of Brazil
