= List of Piauí state symbols =

Location of the state of Piauí in Brazil

The following is a list of symbols of the Brazilian state of Piauí.

== State symbols ==
Type	Symbol	Date	Image
Flag	Flag of Piauí	24 July 1922	
Coat of arms	Coat of arms of Piauí	24 July 1922	
Motto	Impavidum ferient ruinae (Latin: Wounded and undaunted amid the ruins)		
Song	Anthem of Piauí	18 July 1923	

== Flora ==
Type	Symbol	Date	Image
Tree	Carnaúba Copernicia prunifera	21 September 2017	
