= List of Ceará state symbols =

Location of the state of Ceará in Brazil

The Brazilian state of Ceará has four official symbols which have been legally recognized by the state legislature.

Ceará's first official symbol was its coat of arms, which was established by state decree No. 393 on 11 September 1897. It was later incorporated into its state flag, Ceará's second official symbol, when it was established on 25 August 1922 by state decree No. 1,971. The state anthem became Ceara's third official symbol with the passing of state decree No. 27,155 on 31 July 2003, exactly a century after it was first published. Ceará's latest symbol is the Carnaúba, which was designated the State Tree by state decree No. 27,413 on 30 March 2004.

== State symbols ==
Type	Symbol	Date	Image
Coat of arms	Coat of arms of Ceará	11 September 1897	
Flag	Flag of Ceará	25 August 1922	
Song	Anthem of Ceará	31 July 2003	
Tree	Carnaúba Copernicia prunifera	30 March 2004	
