= Cornélio Pires =

Brazilian writer, journalist, and folklorist

- Born: 13 July 1884; Tietê, São Paulo, Brazil
- Died: 17 February 1958 (aged 73); São Paulo, Brazil
- Occupation: Journalist
- Relatives: Elsie Lessa (cousin); Orígenes Lessa (cousin); Ivan Lessa (cousin)

Cornélio Pires (13 July 1884 – 17 February 1958) was a Brazilian journalist, writer, composer, film director, and folklorist.

== Life ==
=== Early life ===
From the ages of 14 and 15, Pires began his career in journalism. At the age of 17, he left his hometown Tietê and moved to São Paulo where he continued his journalism, where he then pursued his other careers during his adulthood.

=== Film career ===
Cornélio Pires's first film, "Brasil Pitoresco", was made in 1924. The film showed Cornélio cruising around Brazil's coastal cities, displaying society in Brazil.

During the 1920s, Cornélio had his highest success in his writing career with As Estrambóticas Aventuras de Joaquim Bentinho. The book was so successful that Pires became one of Brazil's best-selling authors at that time.

Cornélio Pires released 78 rpm records of Caipira music recordings, as opposed to sertanejo music, in 1929. In 1935, he began his radio show and then produced his second film, "Vamos Passear?". In 1945 he published his last book, Enciclopédia de Anedotas e Curiosidades, more than a decade before his death, which during that time he'd become a spiritualist.

Cornélio Pires was a cousin of the writers Elsie Lessa, Orígenes Lessa and Ivan Lessa.
