= Lessa (surname) =

The surname Lessa may refer to:

- Adriana Lessa (born 1971), Brazilian actress, singer, television presenter and dancer
- Anderson Lessa (born 1989), Brazilian footballer
- Aureliano Lessa (1828–1861), Brazilian poet, adept of the "Ultra-romanticism" movement
- Elsie Lessa (1912–2000), Brazilian journalist and writer of American descent
- Fernanda Lessa (born 1977), Brazilian top model
- Ivan Lessa (1935–2012), Brazilian journalist and writer of American descent
- Leandro Lessa Azevedo (born 1980), Brazilian striker
- Orígenes Lessa (1903–1981), Brazilian journalist, novelist and writer
- Ronnie Lessa (born 1970), Brazilian military police officer
- William A. Lessa (1908–1987), American academic and anthropologist
