= List of Santa Catarina state symbols =

Location of the state of Santa Catarina in Brazil

The following is a list of symbols of the Brazilian state of Santa Catarina.

== State symbols ==
Type	Symbol	Date	Image
Flag	Flag of Santa Catarina	29 October 1953	
Coat of arms	Coat of arms of Santa Catarina	15 August 1895	
Song	Hino do Estado de Santa Catarina	6 September 1985	

== Flora ==
Type	Symbol	Date	Image
Flower	Cattleya purpurata Laelia purpurata	21 July 1983	
