= Lessa =

Lessa may refer to:

- Lessa (area), a unit of measurement formerly used in the state of Manipur in India
- Lessa (Argolis), a town of ancient Argolis, Greece
- Lessa (Dragonrider), a fictional character in Anne McCaffrey's Dragonriders of Pern series
- Lessa (surname)

== See also ==
- Lessa Habayeb, a 2006 album by Moustafa Amar
- Salvadoran Sign Language, known by the acronym LESSA
