= List of Rondônia state symbols =

Location of the state of Rondônia in Brazil

The following is a list of symbols of the Brazilian state of Rondônia.

== State symbols ==
Type	Symbol	Date	Image
Flag	Flag of Rondônia	31 December 1981	
Coat of arms	Coat of arms of Rondônia		
Song	Anthem of Rondônia		

== Flora ==
Type	Symbol	Date	Image
Plant	False bird of paradise Helicônia rostrata	13 May 2005	
