= List of São Paulo state symbols =

Location of the state of São Paulo in Brazil

The following is a list of symbols of the Brazilian state of São Paulo.

== State symbols ==
Type	Symbol	Date	Image
Flag	Flag of São Paulo	27 November 1946	
Coat of arms	Coat of arms of São Paulo	29 August 1932	
Song	Anthem of São Paulo	2 October 1967	

== Flora and fauna ==
Type	Symbol	Date	Image
Animal	Brazilian Terrier	17 August 2020	
Tree	Jequitibá-rosa Cariniana legalis	17 November 2021	
