= List of Tocantins state symbols =

Location of the state of Tocantins in Brazil

The following is a list of symbols of the Brazilian state of Tocantins.

== State symbols ==
Type	Symbol	Date	Image
Flag	Flag of Tocantins	17 November 1989	
Coat of arms	Coat of arms of Tocantins	1 January 1989	
Motto	Co yvy ore retama (Tupi: This land is ours)		
Song	Anthem of Tocantins	30 April 1998	

== Flora ==
Type	Symbol	Date	Image
Flower	Sunflower Helianthus annuus	16 July 1997 9 August 2012	
Tree	Fava de Bolota Parkia pendula	16 July 1997 9 August 2012	

== Birds ==
Symbol	Date	Image
Blue-and-yellow macaw Ara ararauna	16 July 1997 9 August 2012	
Scaled dove Scardafella squammata	16 July 1997 9 August 2012	

== Other ==
Type	Symbol	Date	Image
Stone	Garnet A_{3}B_{2}(SiO_{4})_{3}	16 July 1997 9 August 2012	
