= List of Sergipe state symbols =

Location of the state of Sergipe in Brazil

The following is a list of symbols of the Brazilian state of Sergipe.

== State symbols ==
Type	Symbol	Date	Image
Coat of arms	Coat of arms of Sergipe	1892	
Flag	Flag of Sergipe	19 October 1920	
Song	Anthem of Sergipe	24 October 1836	
Tree	Mangabeira Hancornia Speciosa Tul	20 January 1992	
