= List of Rio Grande do Norte state symbols =

Location of the state of Rio Grande do Norte in Brazil

The following is a list of symbols of the Brazilian state of Rio Grande do Norte.

== State symbols ==
Type	Symbol	Date	Image
Flag	Flag of Rio Grande do Norte	3 December 1957	
Coat of arms	Coat of arms of Rio Grande do Norte	1909	
Song	Anthem of Rio Grande do Sul	3 December 1957	

== Flora ==
Type	Symbol	Date	Image
Flower	Orchid Cattleya granulosa	16 May 2019	
