= List of Goiás state symbols =

The following is a list of symbols of the Brazilian state of Goiás.

Location of the state of Goiás in Brazil

== State symbols ==
Type	Symbol	Date	Image
Flag	Flag of Goiás	30 July 1919	
Coat of arms	Coat of arms of Goiás	30 July 1919	
Motto	Terra Querida, fruto da vida (Portuguese: Beloved land, fruit of life)		
Song	Anthem of Goiás	30 July 1919	
