= List of Rio Grande do Sul state symbols =

Location of the state of Rio Grande do Sul in Brazil

The Brazilian state of Rio Grande do Sul has numerous symbols, many of which are officially recognized after a law passed by the state legislature, and were adopted in the 20th century.

Rio Grande do Sul's first official symbol was its flag, which was established by Title VI of the state constitution adopted on 14 July 1891. This Title specified the tricolor of the Riograndense Republic as the state flag and was the only piece of legislation to mention the state flag until 1966 when two more state symbols, the state coat of arms and state song, were adopted. Fifteen additional symbols have been added since 1980, with thirteen of which being added after 2000. The newest symbol of Rio Grande do Sul is the Hino da Legalidade, which was declared the democratic resistance hymn in 2021.

== State symbols ==
Type	Symbol	Date	Image
Flag	Flag of Rio Grande do Sul	14 July 1891	
Coat of arms	Coat of arms of Rio Grande do Sul		
Motto	Liberdade, Igualdade, Humanidade (Portuguese: Liberty, Equality, Humanity)		
Song	Hino Rio-Grandense	5 January 1966	

== Species ==
Type	Symbol	Date	Image
Tree	Yerba Mate Ilex Paraquariensis	8 December 1980	
Flower	Brinco-de-princesa Fuchsia hybrida	16 April 1998	
Medicinal plant	Marcela Achyrocline Satureioides	5 December 2002	
Animal	Crioulo horse	26 August 2002	
Animal	Gado franqueiro	8 September 2010	

== Other ==
Type	Symbol	Date	Image
Typical meal	Churrasco	20 June 2003	
Drink	Chimarrão	20 June 2003	
Musical instrument	Accordion	8 September 2010	
Mineral	Amethyst	24 August 2015	
Country tool	Lasso	21 March 2016	
Elderly persons sport	Câmbio	27 April 2018	
Democratic resistance hymn	Hino da Legalidade	19 October 2021	
Equestrian sport	Horse racing on a straight course	15 April 2014	

== Symbols of Cultural and Historical Heritage ==
Type	Symbol	Date	Image
Animal	Crioulo horse	26 August 2002	
Animal	Quero-quero	26 August 2002	
Sculpture	Estátua do Laçador	13 June 2008	
