= List of Mato Grosso do Sul state symbols =

Location of the state of Mato Grosso do Sul in Brazil

The following is a list of symbols of the Brazilian state of Mato Grosso do Sul.

== State symbols ==
Type	Symbol	Date	Image
Flag	Flag of Mato Grosso do Sul	1 January 1979	
Coat of arms	Coat of arms of Mato Grosso do Sul	1 January 1979	
Song	Hino de Mato Grosso do Sul	1 January 1979	

== Fauna ==
Type	Symbol	Date	Image
Bird	Hyacinth macaw Anodorrynchus hyacinthinus	3 July 2025	

== Flora ==
Type	Symbol	Date	Image
Fruit	Guavira; Campomanesia spp.	8 November 2017	
Tree	Ipê Amarelo; Tabebuia spp.	26 May 2020	
