= List of Espírito Santo state symbols =

Location of the state of Espírito Santo in Brazil

The following is a list of symbols of the Brazilian state of Espírito Santo.

== State symbols ==
Type	Symbol	Date	Image
Coat of arms	Coat of arms of Espírito Santo	24 July 1909	
Flag	Flag of Espírito Santo	24 July 1909	
Seal	Seal of Espírito Santo	24 July 1909	
Song	Anthem of Espírito Santo	24 July 1909	

== Flora and fauna ==
Type	Symbol	Date	Image
Bird	Hummingbird	5 December 1984	
Tree	Jequitibá-rosa Cariniana legalis	8 February 2000	
