= Elsie Lessa =

Brazilian writer (1912–2000)

- Born: 1912
- Died: 17 May 2000 (aged 88)
- Occupation: Writer, reporter
- Spouse: Orígenes Lessa; Ivan Pedro de Martins
- Children: Ivan Lessa
- Relatives: Júlio Ribeiro (grandfather); Cornélio Pires (cousin)

Elsie Lessa (1912 – 17 May 2000) was a Brazilian journalist and writer of American descent.

== Biography ==
Lessa was hired as a reporter for the newspaper O Globo in 1946. From 1952 till her death in May 2000, she wrote continuously for the paper. No other writer had a permanent role with the paper for so long.

She was considered one of the two most beautiful women of her day in Rio de Janeiro, along with Adalgisa Nery). The writer Rubem Braga tells of how he followed her for a long time through the streets of downtown São Paulo, just to enjoy her beauty and grace.

The writer Ruy Castro, in his book Ela é Carioca said of her: "Elsie has to be placed beside the greatest masters of a genre in the language, like Rubem Braga, Paulo Mendes Campos and Fernando Sabino".

She was a granddaughter of the writer and grammarian Júlio Ribeiro, patron of the 24th chair of the Brazilian Academy of Letters and the creator of the flag of the State of São Paulo.

She was married to the writer Orígenes Lessa, with whom she had a son, the writer and journalist Ivan Lessa. Lessa later married journalist and writer Ivan Pedro de Martins. She is the grandmother of the writer Juliana Foster, and aunt and godmother of the writer and translator Sergio Pinheiro Lopes.

== Selected bibliography ==
Books:

- Pelos caminhos do mundo (1950). Rio de Janeiro: A Noite.
- A dama da noite: crońicas (1963). Rio de Janeiro: Livraria J. Olympio.
- Crônicas de amor e desamor (1973). Rio de Janeiro: F. Alves.
- Ponte Rio-Londres (1984). Rio de Janeiro: Editora Record.
- Formoso tejo meu: (Crónicas) (1998). Lisbon: Editora Pergaminho. ISBN 972-711-173-4
- Canta que avida é un dia. Crônicas reunidas. (1998). Rio de Janeiro: Razao Cultural. ISBN 85-86280-25-9
