= Alfredo Pujol =

Brazilian literary critic

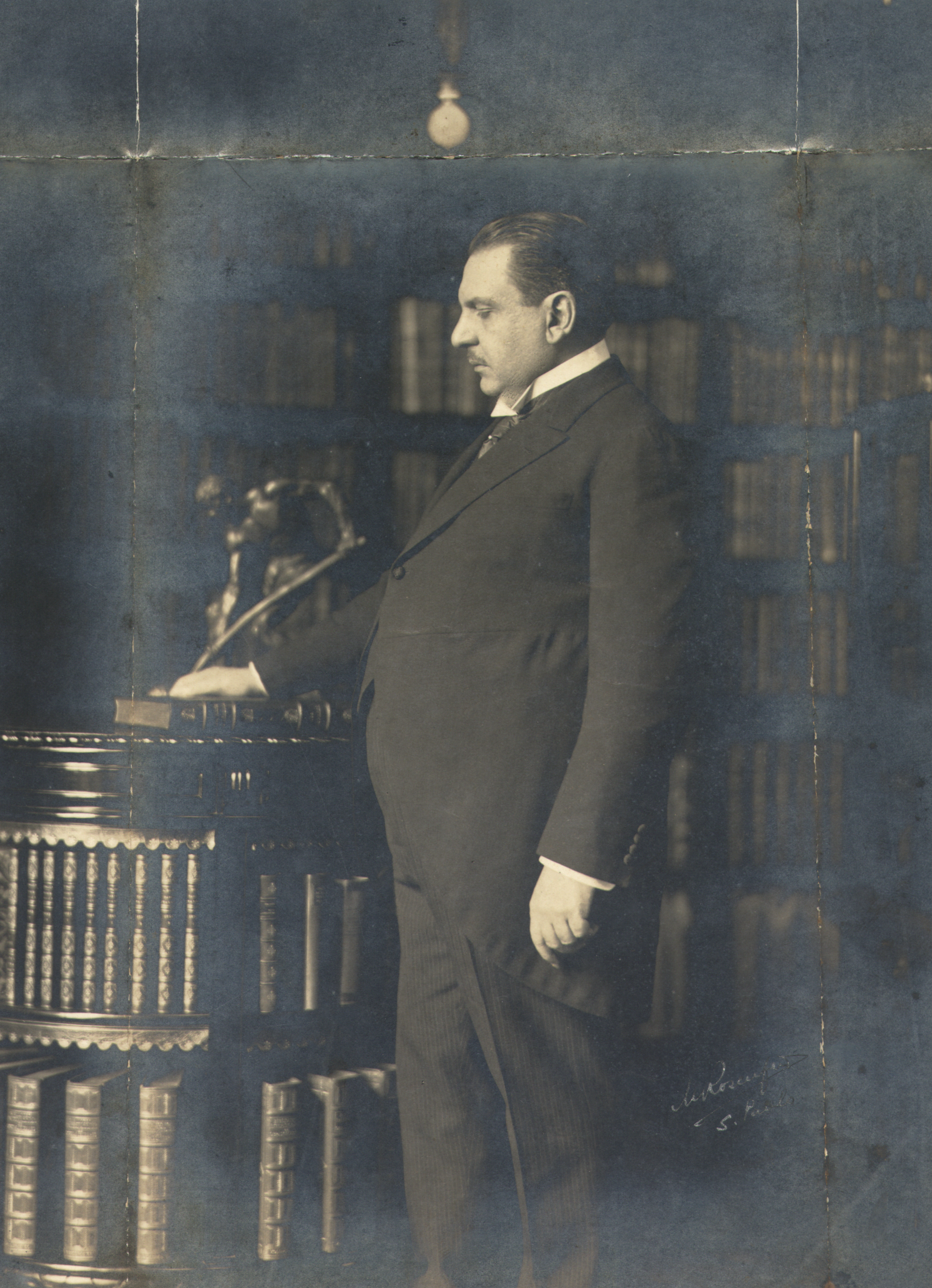
- Born: March 20, 1865; São João Marcos, Rio de Janeiro, Empire of Brazil
- Died: May 20, 1930 (aged 65); São Paulo, São Paulo, Brazil
- Education: Faculty of Law of São Paulo
- Occupations: Lawyer, journalist
- Notable work: Machado de Assis (1917)
- Political party: Paulista Republican Party

Alfredo Gustavo Pujol (March 20, 1865 – May 20, 1930) was a Brazilian lawyer, journalist, literary critic, politician, and collector of books. He is best known for his conferences and studies on the works of Machado de Assis.

== Biography ==
Born in São João Marcos into a family of French descent, Pujol was educated at home by his father, who was himself a man of letters. He enrolled at the Faculty of Law of São Paulo, where he came in contact with the republican movement. During his studies, Pujol began his career as a journalist and also worked as a private tutor. He later wrote for O Estado de S. Paulo and Diário Mercantil, as well as for other newspapers from Campinas and Rio de Janeiro.

As a politician, Pujol served as state deputy for several terms, and as federal deputy for the Paulista Republican Party. In the early 1890s, he proposed reforms to public education, which would culminate in the project of the Primeiro Gymnasio da Capital (pt). Pujol was, alongside Júlio de Mesquita and Luís Pereira Barreto, one of the directors of Revista do Brasil (pt), a literary revue of nationalist orientation which anticipated several elements of Modernism in Brazil.

Pujol's writings gained broader attention with his essay on the novel A Carne, by Júlio Ribeiro, in which he criticized the book as lacking literary quality. The article positioned him within debates on realism and naturalism, and his critiques of the works of Machado de Assis, compiled in a 1917 homonymous collection, were widely read and discussed. Pujol's vast collection of books, which included rare and historic volumes, was used to found the pioneering Livraria José Olympio Editora (pt).

He was a member of the Brazilian Academy of Letters and of the Brazilian Historic and Geographic Institute.

== Works ==
- Mocidade e poesia
- Homenagem à memória de Sadi Carnot (1894)
- Floriano Peixoto (1895)
- O Direito na confederação (1898)
- Processos Criminais (1908)
- Machado de Assis (1917)
