= Flag of Bahia =

Flag of the Brazilian state of Bahia

- Use: Civil and state flag
- Proportion: 2:3
- Adopted: 11 June 1960
- Design: Four alternating horizontal stripes of equal length in white and red; in the upper hoist-side canton, a white equilateral triangle on a blue field

The flag of Bahia is one of the official state symbols of the Brazilian state of Bahia. The current flag was introduced on June 11, 1960.

== History ==
=== Early flags ===
During the Revolt of the Tailors, the revolutionaries adopted the following flag which would have become the flag of the Baiano Republic had the revolution been successful.

Flag of the 1798 Revolt of the Tailors.

=== Modern flag ===
The Bahian physician, Dr. Deocleciano Ramos, presented the flag while serving as a representative during a meeting of the Republican Party in Salvador on May 25, 1889. The flag was adopted as the party's flag the following day.

The flag is strongly influenced by the Flag of the United States, along with a triangle evocative of Freemasonry, which was already adopted during the unsuccessful 1789 separatist movement of Inconfidência Mineira. The colors red, white, and blue had also appeared during the 1798 Bahian slave rebellion of the Revolt of the Tailors, also known as the Bahian Conspiracy and lately the Revolt of Buzios.

The flag was officially adopted by governor Juracy Magalhães, with Decree No. 17628 of June 11, 1960.

== Related flags ==
Flag of the Guanais Federation.

Flag of the Bahian Republic during the Sabinada (1837–1838).

Unofficial flag of the Bahia province (until 1889).

Alternative design of the Bahian flag, commonly used during the First Brazilian Republic (1889–1930).
