= O Feijão e o Sonho =

Book by Orígenes Lessa

- 1980 edition
- Author: Orígenes Lessa
- Language: Portuguese
- Publication date: 1938
- Publication place: Brazil
- Media type: Print (paperback)
- Pages: 145

O Feijão e o Sonho (en: The Bean and the Dream) is a novel by Brazilian writer Orígenes Lessa, published in 1938.

Torn between needing money to feed his family and desiring to be coherent to his own ideals and convictions, Campos Lara, living on a small rural town with his wife, Maria Rosa, and their children, works as a teacher to the sons of the local farmers. A poet, he tends to forget practical matters in favor of intellectual reveries; whilst he feels isolated, living in a forgotten place, without anyone with whom to discuss his thoughts, his wife struggles to keep their house from falling apart and their children from starving.
