= Flag of Rio Grande do Norte =

Flag of the Brazilian state of Rio Grande do Norte

- Use: Civil and state flag
- Proportion: 2:3
- Adopted: 3 December 1957
- Designed by: Luís da Câmara Cascudo

The flag of Rio Grande do Norte is the official flag of the Brazilian state of Rio Grande do Norte. It was designed by Luís da Câmara Cascudo. It is a horizontal bicolor of green and white with a ratio of 2:3. In the center is the coat of arms of Rio Grande do Norte. The arms features the basic elements that best represents Rio Grande do Norte: the coconut tree on the left, the Copernicia prunifera on the right, the sugarcane and the cotton, all represent the flora of the state, while the sea with the jangada illustrates the state's industries of fishing and salt extraction.

The flag was adopted on 3 December 1957.

== See also ==
- List of Rio Grande do Norte state symbols
