= Flag of Ceará =

Flag of the Brazilian state of Ceará

- Use: Civil and state flag
- Proportion: 7:10
- Adopted: 22 August 1922; 104 years ago
- Design: A green field with a large yellow rhombus in the center bearing a white disk, which contains the coat of arms of the state of Ceará.
- Designed by: João Tibúrcio Albano

The flag of Ceará is the official flag of the Brazilian state of Ceará. The original version of the flag was adopted on 25 August 1922 by state decree 1,971 of Ceará.

== History ==
=== Initial design ===
The original flag was created by the prominent merchant João Tibúrcio Albano (1860 – 1924), the son of José Francisco da Silva Albano. João Albano would hoist the flag of his partner's state of Maranhão outside of his manor for special occasions and decided to design a flag for his state of Ceará after discovering that one did not exist. He designed it by replacing the central blue circle of the national flag with the state coat of arms. Prior to its official adoption, the flag was widely used across Ceará during the governorship of Pedro Borges and adorned public buildings, state schools, and the Palácio da Luz. The flag was officially adopted on 25 August 1922 by state decree 1,971 of Ceará.

=== Flag updates ===
The state flag was modified on 31 December 1967 by state decree 8,889 to use the updated coat of arms per the suggestion of historian Raimundo Girão. The flag was updated again on 21 June 2007 by state decree 13,897 to include a new simplified coat of arms.

Original flag, (1922 – 1937 and 1947 – 1967)

Flag with coat of arms updated by decree 8,889, (1968 – 2007)

Flag with coat of arms updated by decree 13,897, (2007 – present)

== Symbolism ==
The fort and the Mucuripe Lighthouse in the seal represent the structures that protected the state from naval invasions and guided friendly vessels.

The seven stars on the seal represent the 7 mesoregions of the state.

The symbols on the state coat of arms represents the 4 classical elements.

- Bottom-right: The Carnaúba tree is the state tree of Ceará and represents earth.
- Bottom-left: The jangada boat represents water.
- Top-right: The dove and mountains represent air.
- Top-left: The sun represents fire.

The dove and the jangada also represent the Jangadeiro's Strike that occurred in Ceará and led to the then province to abolish slavery 3 years before the rest of the nation.

== See also ==
- List of Ceará state symbols
- History of Ceará
