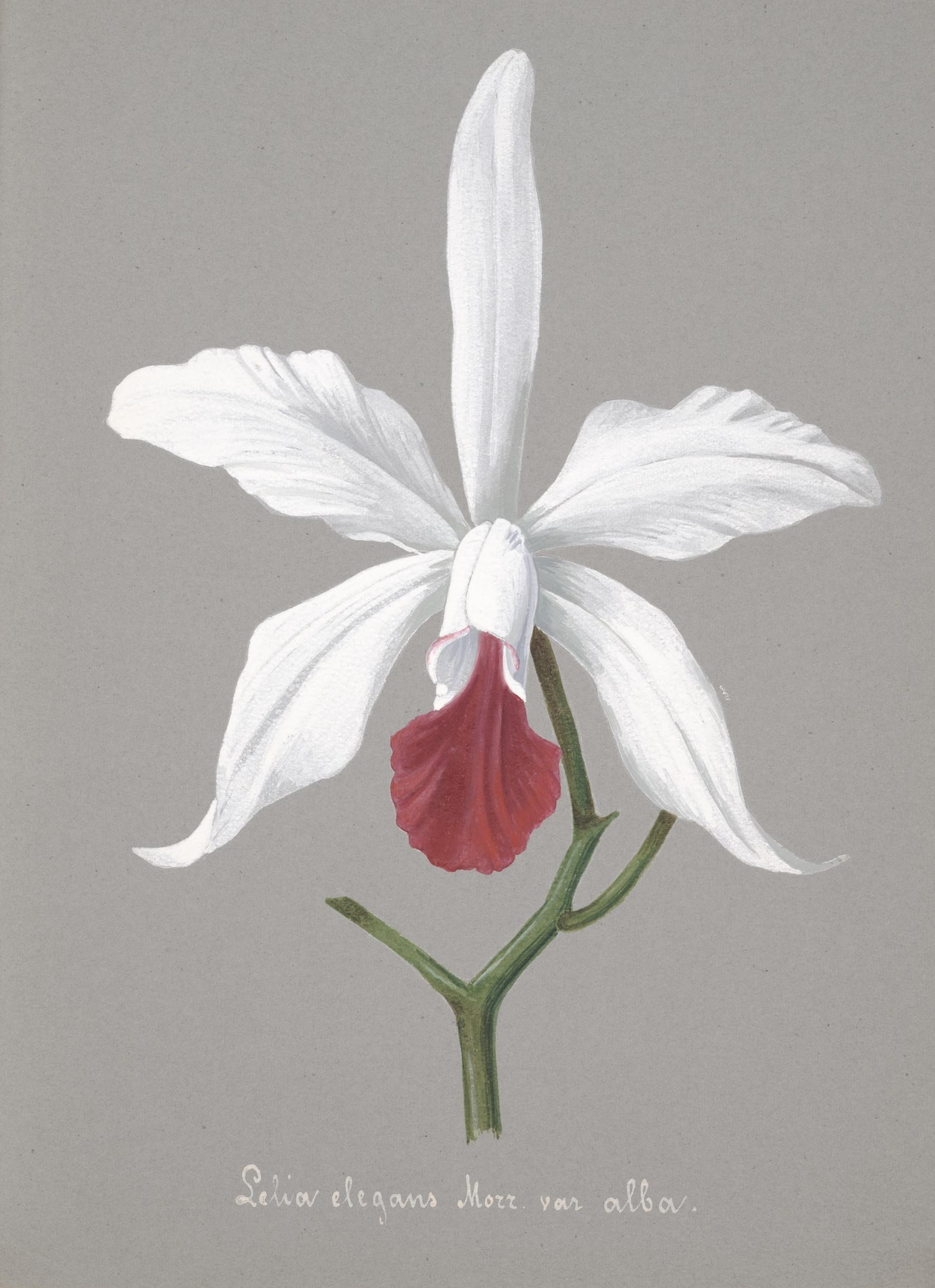
- Laelia elegans var. alba in Collection d'orchidées [art original] :aquarelles originales.

Scientific classification
- Kingdom: Plantae
- Clade: Tracheophytes
- Clade: Angiosperms
- Clade: Monocots
- Order: Asparagales
- Family: Orchidaceae
- Subfamily: Epidendroideae
- Genus: Cattleya
- Species: C. × elegans

Binomial name
- Cattleya × elegans C.Morren, 1848

Synonyms
- Many, including: Bletia × elegans (C.Morren) Rchb.f.; Bletia × elegans var. houtteana (Rchb.f.) Rchb.f.; Brasicattleya elegans (C.Morren) Campacci; Cattleya elegans C.Morren; Cattleya × devonia auct.; Cattleya × devoniensis (Rchb.f.) T.Moore; Hadrocattleya elegans (C.Morren) V.P.Castro & Chiron; Hadrocattleya elegans f. leucotata (L.Linden) F.Barros & J.A.N.Bat.; Laelia × brysiana Lem.; Laelia × devoniensis Rchb.f.; Laelia elegans Rchb. f.; Laelia × elegans (C.Morren) Rchb.f.; Laelia × elegans var. alba Barb.Rodr.; Laelia × elegans var. blenheimensis B.S.Williams; Laelia × elegans var. gigantea (R.Warner) A.H.Kent; Laelia × elegans var. houtteana Rchb.f.; Laelia × elegans var. incantans Rchb.f.; Laelia × elegans var. morreniana Rchb.f.; Laelia × elegans var. picta Rchb.f.; Laelia × elegans var. schilleriana A.H.Kent; Laelia × elegans var. tautziana Rchb.f.; Laelia × elegans var. turneri (R.Warner) A.H.Kent; Laelia × gigantea R.Warner; Laelia × pachystele Rchb.f.; Laelia × turneri R.Warner; × Laeliocattleya elegans (C.Morren) Rolfe; × Laeliocattleya elegans var. leucotata L.Linden; Laeliocattleya pachystele (Rchb.f.) Rchb.f.; Laeliocattleya sayana Linden; Laeliocattleya schulziana Linden; × Sophrocattleya elegans (C.Morren) Van den Berg & M.W.Chase

= Cattleya × elegans =

Species of orchid

Cattleya × elegans is a hybrid orchid in the subtribe Laeliinae. It is a pseudobulb epiphyte. Its hybrid formula is Cattleya purpurata (Lindl. & Paxton) Van den Berg (2008) × Cattleya tigrina A.Rich. (1848). It is found in South and South-East Brazil.
