= List of Brazilian flags =

Overview of Brazilian flags

This article is a list of Brazilian flags.

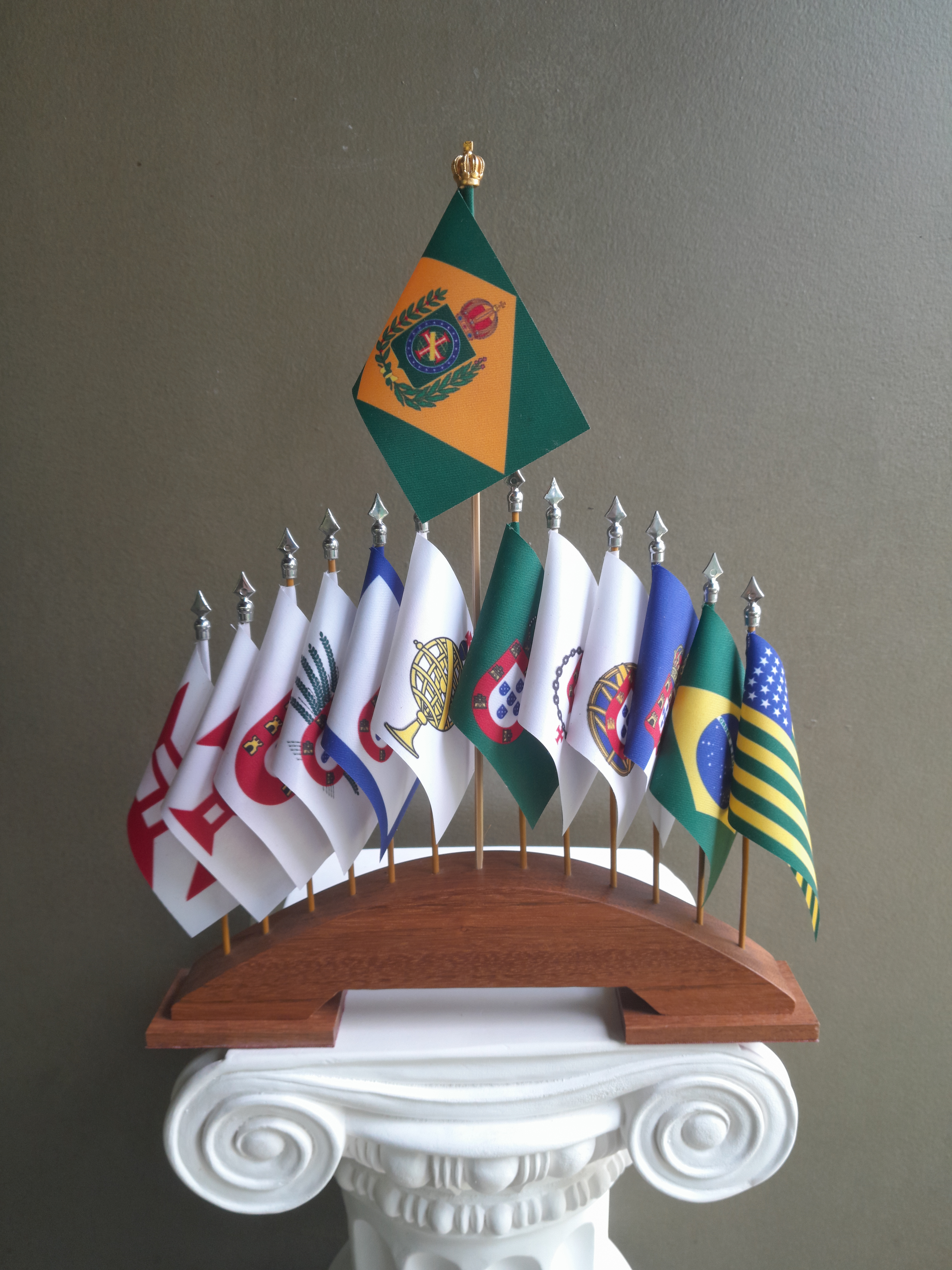
Historical flags of Brazil, in panoply.

== National flags ==
Flag	Date	Use	Description
	1992–present	National flag and ensign	A blue disc depicting a starry sky containing 27 stars, spanned by a curved white band inscribed with the national motto, placed within a yellow rhombus over a green field. The yellow rhombus and green background originated in the imperial flag, in which they represented the House of Habsburg-Lorraine and the House of Braganza, respectively. The blue circle represents the sky and stars over Rio de Janeiro on the morning of 15 November 1889, as viewed by a hypothetical observer external to the celestial sphere. Each star represents a federative unit as defined by law, and new stars are included or removed with the creation or fusion of states. The lone star above the white band is Spica (α Virginis) and represents the state of Pará, which had the largest amount of land north of the Equator in 1889.

== Government flags ==
Flag	Date	Use	Description
	1907–1947	Presidential standard of the United States of Brazil (1907–1947)	
	1947–1968	Presidential standard of the United States of Brazil (1947–1968)	Badge moved to centre
	1968–1971	Presidential standard of the Federative Republic of Brazil (1968–1971)	Stars in ring increased and country renamed to Federative Republic
	1971–1992	Presidential standard of the Federative Republic of Brazil (1971–1992)	Stars in ring increased again
	1992–	Presidential standard	Dark green rectangle (ratio 2:3) holding the national coat of arms in its center.
	1971–1992	Vice presidential standard of the Federative Republic of Brazil (1971–1992)	
	1992–	Vice presidential standard	Yellow rectangle (ratio 2:3) with 21 blue stars arranged in a cross dividing the flag into four equal quadrants, with the coat of arms in the middle of the upper hoist quadrant.
		Flag of the Minister of Defense	Yellow swallowtail flag with 21 blue stars arranged in a cross dividing the flag into four quadrants, five in each arm and one in the center; in the upper hoist quadrant star of the coat of arms.
		Flag of the Brazilian Senate (de facto)	

=== Ministries ===
Flag	Date	Use	Description
	1941–2001	Flag of the Minister of Aeronautics	
	1889–1999	Flag of the Minister of the Army	
	1917	Flag of the Minister of the Navy	
	1889–1999	Flag of the Minister of the Navy	

=== Imperial standards of Brazil ===
Flag	Date	Use	Description
	c. 1822–1853	Standard of the Emperor of Brazil	Green field charged with the imperial coat of arms in gold with gold leaves in each of its corners.
	1853–1889	Standard of the Emperor of Brazil	Green field charged with the imperial coat of arms in gold with gold leaves in each of its corners.
	c. 1824–1889	Standard of the Prince Imperial of Brazil	White field charged with the coat of arms of the imperial prince and blue leaves in each of its corners.

=== Judiciary flags ===
Flag	Date	Use	Description
	1958–	Flag of the Federal Supreme Court	
	1958–	Superior Military Court	

== Diplomatic services flags ==
Flag	Date	Use	Description
	1958–present	Ambassador flag	
	1958–present	Envoy extraordinary flag	
	1958–present	Chargé d'affaires flag	
	1958–present	Consul general flag	
	1958–present	Consul flag	
	1958–1982	Vice consul flag	

== Military flags ==
Flag	Date	Use	Description
		Flag of the Chief of the Joint Staff of the Armed Forces	

=== Brazilian Air Force ===
Flag	Date	Use	Description
	1999–	Flag of the Aeronautics Command	Rectangular flag bearing the coat of arms of the Aeronautics Command on a sky blue field crossed from the upper hoist corner to the bottom fly by a large blue stripe.
		Flag of the Chief of the Aeronautics Staff	
		Rank flag of the marshal of the air	
		Rank flag of the air lieutenant-brigadier	
		Rank flag of the air major-brigadier	
		Rank flag of the air brigadier	
		Rank flag of the aviation colonel	
		Rank flag of the aviation lieutenant colonel	
		Rank flag of the aviation major	
		Rank flag of the aviation captain	

=== Brazilian Army ===
Flag	Date	Use	Description
	1987–	Flag of the Brazilian Army	Rectangular flag bearing the coat of arms of the Brazilian Army on a white field.
	1987–	Standard of the Brazilian Army	
	1980–	Flag of the Chief of the Army Staff	
		Flag of the brigadier general	
		Flag of the major general	
		Flag of the Army general	
	1999–2022	Flag of the Army commander	
	2022–	Flag of the Army commander	

=== Brazilian Navy ===
Flag	Date	Use	Description
	1982–	Flag of the Brazilian Navy	Rectangular flag bearing the coat of arms of the Brazilian Navy on a white field.
	1847–	Naval jack	Dark blue flag bearing 21 white stars arranged in a cross – a horizontal row of 13 and a vertical column of 9.
	1931–	Flag of the Brazilian Marine Corps	
	1992–	Flag of the Admiralty	
	1982–	Flag of the Chief of the Naval Staff	
	1982–	Flag of the Chief of Naval Operations	
		Flag of the Patron of the Brazilian Navy	
	1958–	Flag of the Admiral of the Fleet	
	1958–	Rank flag of the Admiral of the Fleet when commanding a force	
	1958–	Flag of the Commander-in-Chief of the Fleet when an Admiral of the Fleet	
	1958–	Flag of the Senior Officer Present Afloat when an Admiral of the Fleet	
	1958–	Rank flag of the admiral	
	1958–	Rank flag of the admiral when commanding a force	
	1958–	Flag of the Commander-in-Chief of the Fleet when an admiral	
	1958–	Flag of the Senior Officer Present Afloat when an admiral	
	1958–	Rank flag of the vice admiral	
	1958–	Rank flag of the vice admiral when commanding a force	
	1958–	Flag of the Commander-in-Chief of the Fleet when a vice admiral	
	1958–	Flag of the Senior Officer Present Afloat when a vice admiral	
	1958–	Rank flag of the rear admiral	
	1958–	Rank flag of the rear admiral when commanding a force	
	1958–	Flag of the Commander-in-Chief of the Fleet when a rear admiral	
	1958–	Flag of the Senior Officer Present Afloat when a rear admiral	
	1958–	Rank flag of the captain when commanding a force	
	1958–	Flag of the Senior Officer Present Afloat when a senior officer	
	1958–	Flag of the port captain	
	1958–	Rank flag of the commander or the lieutenant commander when commanding a force	
	2002–	Flag of the Commandant-General of the Marine Corps	
	1958–	Rank flag of the Admiral of the Fleet Commanding a Force of Marines	
	1958–	Rank flag of the admiral Commanding a Force of Marines	
	1958–	Rank flag of the vice admiral Commanding a Force of Marines	
	1958–	Rank flag of the rear admiral Commanding a Force of Marines	
	1958–	Rank flag of the captain Commanding a Force of Marines	
	1958–	Rank flag of the commander or the lieutenant commander Commanding a Force of Marines	
	1958–	Commissioning pennant of the Brazilian Navy	
	1958–	Commissioning pennant of a senior officer	
	1958–	"Decommissioning pennant" of the Brazilian Navy	

== Police flags ==
Flag	Date	Use	Description
		Flag of the Federal Police of Brazil	Light blue rectangular flag bearing the coat of arms of the Federal Police.
		Flag of the Federal Highway Police	Dark blue rectangular flag bearing the coat of arms of the Federal Highway Police.
		Flag of the Civil Police of Rio de Janeiro State	
		Flag of the Military Police of Rio de Janeiro State	Vertical tricolor of dark blue, gold, and red, with the corporation's coat of arms in the center and the emblems of the 31st (in the blue band) and 12th (in the red band) Volunteer Corps of the Fatherland.
		Flag of the Military Police of Paraná State	Rectangular flag bearing the coat of arms of the Military Police on a dark blue field.
		Flag of the Civil Police of São Paulo State	

== First-level administrative divisions ==
This list shows the flags of the 26 Brazilian States and the Federal District.

Flag	Map	Use
		Flag of Acre
		Flag of Alagoas
		Flag of Amapá
		Flag of Amazonas
		Flag of Bahia
		Flag of Ceará
		Flag of Espírito Santo
		Flag of Goiás
		Flag of Maranhão
		Flag of Mato Grosso
		Flag of Mato Grosso do Sul
		Flag of Minas Gerais
		Flag of Pará
		Flag of Paraíba
		Flag of Paraná
		Flag of Pernambuco
		Flag of Piauí
		Flag of Rio de Janeiro
		Flag of Rio Grande do Norte
		Flag of Rio Grande do Sul
		Flag of Rondônia
		Flag of Roraima
		Flag of Santa Catarina
		Flag of São Paulo
		Flag of Sergipe
		Flag of Tocantins
		Flag of the Federal District

== Political flags ==
=== Current ===
Flag	Date	Party
	2009–present	8th October Revolutionary Movement
	2004–present	Socialism and Liberty Party
	1995–present	Workers' Cause Party
	1994–present	United Socialist Workers' Party
	1988–present	Communist Party of Brazil
	2022–present	Workers' Party
	1979–present	Democratic Labour Party
	2016–present	Popular Unity
	2017–present	Avante
	2017–present	Christian Democracy
	2025–present	Mission Party

=== Historical ===
Flag	Date	Party
	1980–2022	Workers' Party
	1995–2017	Christian Social Democratic Party
	1994–2004	Social Liberal Party
	1989–2006	Party of the Reconstruction of the National Order
	1985–1993	Christian Democratic Party
	1966–1979	National Renewal Alliance
	1932–1937	Brazilian Integralist Action
	1932	Brazilian Integralist Action
	1932–1937	Brazilian Patrianovist Imperial Action

== Historical flags ==
Flag	Date	Use	Description
	1332–1651	Flag of the Order of Christ	A white flag charged with the red Cross of the Order of Christ.
	1500–1521	Royal Portuguese flag	A white flag charged with the red Cross of the Order of Christ with the Royal Portuguese Shield.
	1521–1616	Flag of John III of Portugal	A white flag charged with the Royal Portuguese Coat of Arms.
	1616–1640	Flag of Portugal during the Spanish Dominium	A white flag charged with the Royal Portuguese Coat of Arms on top of green pilgrimage.
	1630–1654	The Prince's Flag	A horizontal triband of orange, white, and blue.
	1652–1654	States Flag	A horizontal triband of red, white, and blue
	1640–1683	Flag of John IV of Portugal during the Portuguese Restoration War	A white flag with blue borders charged with the Royal Portuguese Coat of Arms.
	1645–1816	Flag of Portuguese Brazil	The armillary sphere representing the Portuguese navigation on a white field.
	1683–1706	Flag of Pedro II of Brazil	A green flag charged with the Royal Portuguese Coat of Arms.
	1600–1700	Royal Portuguese flag during the XVII century	A white flag charged with the Royal Portuguese Coat of Arms on top of the necklace of the Order of Christ.
	1816–1821	Flag of the United Kingdom of Portugal, Brazil and the Algarves	The coat of arms of the union with the armillary sphere representing the Kingdom of Brazil and the Portuguese shield representing the Kingdom of Portugal and the Algarves, with a Royal Crown, on a white field.
	1821–1822	Flag of the Constitutional Regime	A vertical bicolor of blue and white bearing the Portuguese royal coat of arms.
	1822	Flag of the newly independent Kingdom of Brazil	The Prince Royal's Personal Standard with a Royal Crown instead of an Imperial.
	1822–1853	Flag of the Empire of Brazil	The Imperial Coat of Arms, within a yellow rhombus representing the House of Habsburg, on a green field representing the House of Braganza.
	1853–1889	Flag of the Empire of Brazil	The Imperial Coat of Arms, within a yellow rhombus representing the House of Habsburg, on a green field representing the House of Braganza.
	1889	Provisional flag of the Republic of the United States of Brazil between 15–19 November 1889	Thirteen horizontal green and yellow stripes; in the canton, 21 white stars on a blue field.
	1889–1960	Flag of Brazil	A blue disc depicting a starry sky (with 21 stars) spanned by a curved band inscribed with the national motto, within a yellow rhombus, on a green field.
	1960–1968	Flag of Brazil	A blue disc depicting a starry sky (with 22 stars) spanned by a curved band inscribed with the national motto, within a yellow rhombus, on a green field.
	1968–1992	Flag of Brazil	A blue disc depicting a starry sky (with 23 stars) spanned by a curved band inscribed with the national motto, within a yellow rhombus, on a green field.

== Proposed flags ==
Flag	Date	Use	Description
	1888	Júlio Ribeiro's proposal	
	1890	Antônio da Silva Jardim's proposal	
	1890	José Maria da Silva Paranhos Júnior's proposal	
	1892	Oliveira Valadão's proposal	
	1908	Wenceslau Escobar's proposal	
	1908	Eurico de Góis' proposal	
	1922	Eurico de Góis' proposal	

== House flags of Brazilian freight companies ==
Flag	Date	Company	Description
	around 1756	Companhia Geral de Comércio de Pernambuco e Paraíba^{pt}	
	around 1756	Grão Pará and Maranhão Company	
	1894–1998	Lloyd Brasileiro	

== Yacht clubs of Brazil ==
Flag	Club
	Cabanga Iate Clube de Pernambuco
	Clube dos Jangadeiros
	Clube Internacional de Regatas
	Clube de Regatas Guanabara
	Clube de Aracaju
	Clube de Guaratuba
	Clube de Santos
	Clube Rio Janeiro
	Rio Yacht Club
	Veleiros do Sul
	Yacht Clube da Bahía
	Yacht Club Paulista
	Yacht Club Santo Amaro

== See also ==
- Flag of Brazil
- Brazilian National Anthem
