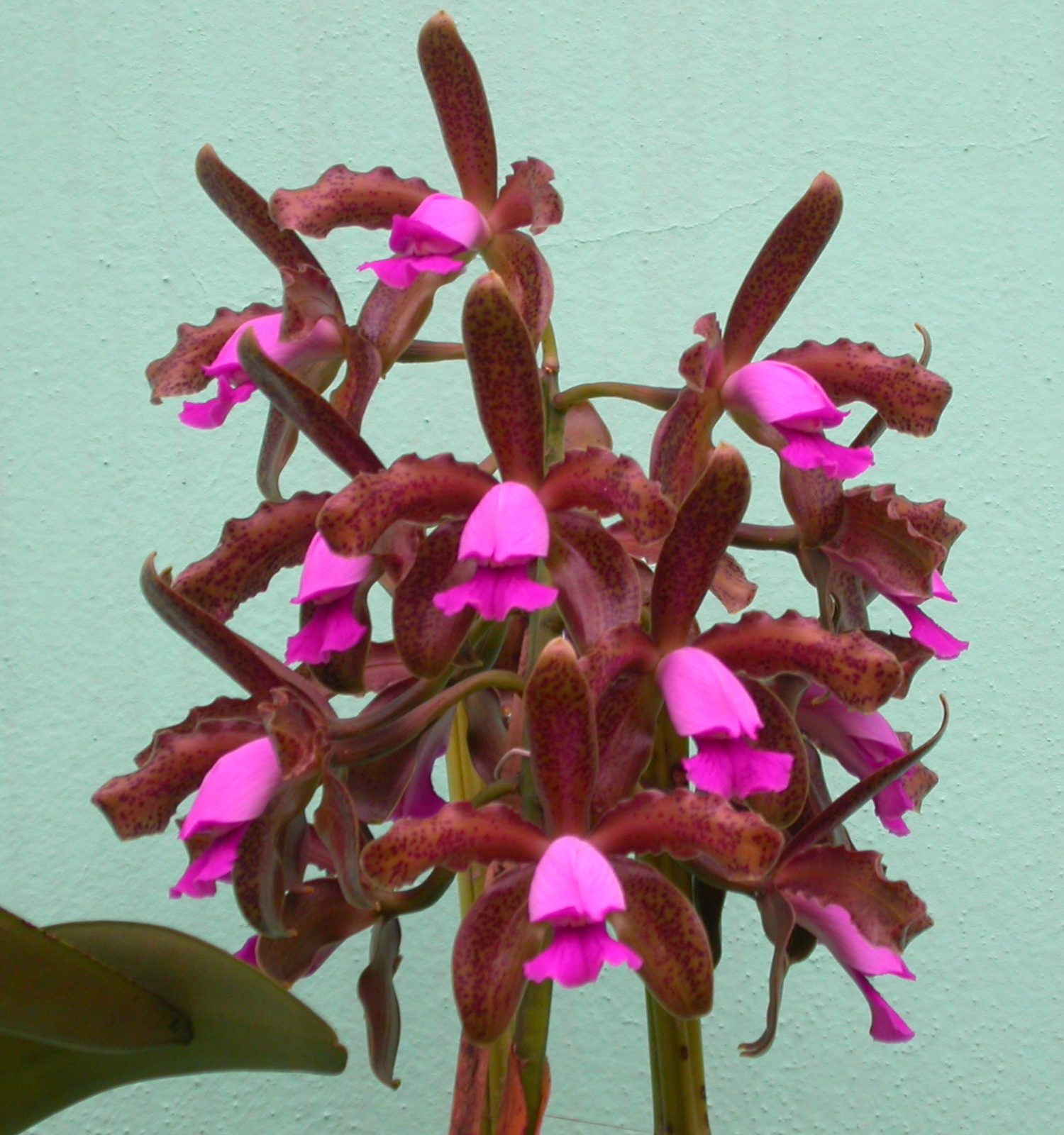

Scientific classification
- Kingdom: Plantae
- Clade: Tracheophytes
- Clade: Angiosperms
- Clade: Monocots
- Order: Asparagales
- Family: Orchidaceae
- Subfamily: Epidendroideae
- Genus: Cattleya
- Subgenus: Cattleya subg. Intermediae
- Species: C. tigrina

Binomial name
- Cattleya tigrina A.Rich.

Synonyms
- Cattleya guttata subvar. immaculata Rchb.f.; Cattleya guttata var. leopardina L. Linden & Rodigas; Cattleya guttata var. leopoldii (Verschaff. ex Lem.) Linden & Rchb.f.; Cattleya guttata var. purpurea Cogn.; Cattleya guttata var. williamsiana Rchb.f.; Cattleya leopoldii f. alba (Fowlie) M. Wolff & O. Gruss; Cattleya leopoldii f. caerulea (L.C. Menezes) M. Wolff & O. Gruss; Cattleya leopoldii f. immaculata (Rchb.f.) M. Wolff & O. Gruss; Cattleya leopoldii var. alba Fowlie; Cattleya leopoldii var. immaculata (Rchb.f.) Fowlie; Cattleya leopoldii var. leopardina (L. Linden & Rodigas) Fowlie; Cattleya leopoldii var. williamsiana (Rchb.f.) Fowlie; Cattleya leopoldii Verschaff. ex Lem.; Cattleya sororia Rchb.f.; Cattleya tigrina var. caerulea L.C. Menezes; Cattleya tigrina var. immaculata (Rchb.f.) Braem; Cattleya tigrina var. leopardina (L. Linden & Rodigas) Braem; Cattleya tigrina var. purpurea (Cogn.) Braem; Cattleya tigrina var. williamsiana (Rchb.f.) Braem; Epidendrum elatius var. leopoldii (Verschaff. ex Lem.) Rchb.f.; Epidendrum elegans Vell.

= Cattleya tigrina =

Species of orchid

Cattleya tigrina is a bifoliate species of Cattleya orchid. The diploid chromosome number of C. tigrina has been determined as 2n = 40.

== Hybrids ==
Cattleya × elegans is a hybrid orchid with a formula hybridae Cattleya purpurata (Lindl. & Paxton) Van den Berg (2008) × Cattleya tigrina A.Rich. (1848). It is found in South and South-East Brazil.
