= A Carne =

Book by Júlio Ribeiro

- Author: Júlio Ribeiro
- Language: Portuguese
- Publisher: Teixeira & Irmão
- Publication date: 1888
- Publication place: Brazil
- Media type: Hardcover

A Carne (in English: The Flesh) is an 1888 naturalistic novel by Júlio Ribeiro. It is one of the most controversial works of the Brazilian literature, being frequently compared and considered as a forerunner to D. H. Lawrence's Lady Chatterley's Lover.

== Plot ==
Lenita is a young, naive 22-year-old woman who, recently orphaned, goes to live with an old farmer who raised her father. In the farmer's house, she meets his son, Manuel Barbosa, a divorced man. They soon start a forbidden love relationship.

== Criticism ==
A Carne has themes considered to be "strong" for the time it was released (the 19th century), such as divorce and heavy eroticism, among others. A naturalistic novel, it bears the influence of Émile Zola, whose work Riberio praised. Many people have negatively reviewed the romance, such as José Veríssimo and Alfredo Pujol. The most vehement critic was the priest Sena Freitas, who wrote an article entitled A Carniça (English: The Carrion) for the famous newspaper Diário Mercantil, for which the book's author, Júlio Ribeiro, also worked. Ribeiro refuted Freitas' critiques in the articles O Urubu Sena Freitas (English: Sena Freitas, the Vulture). Freitas' and Ribeiro's articles were compiled and published posthumously in 1934 under the title Uma Polêmica Célebre (English: A Famous Controversy).

Ribeiro once said, referring to his position:

Of the controversies I have caused, not one of them was caused by me. I don't know how to attack; I only know how to defend myself — how to retaliate.

== Adaptations ==
The novel was adapted into an eponymous film in 1975. Directed by J. Marreco, the film starred Selma Egrei, Newton Prado and Geraldo Del Rey. Unlike the novel, the film was not controversial, as it was made during the pornochanchada period.
