= Júlio Ribeiro =

Brazilian grammarian

- A photograph of Ribeiro
- Born: Júlio César Ribeiro Vaughan; 16 April 1845; Sabará, Minas Gerais, Empire of Brazil
- Died: 1 November 1890 (aged 45); Santos, São Paulo, Brazil
- Education: University of São Paulo
- Occupations: novelist, journalist, philologist
- Relatives: Elsie Lessa, Ivan Lessa
- Writing career
- Notable work: A Carne
- Literary movement: Naturalism

Júlio César Ribeiro Vaughan (April 16, 1845 – November 1, 1890) was a Brazilian Naturalist novelist, philologist, journalist and grammarian. He is famous for his controversial romance A Carne and for designing the flag of the State of São Paulo, which he wanted to be the flag of Brazil.

He is patron of the 24th chair of the Brazilian Academy of Letters.

== Life ==
Ribeiro was born in 1845, in Sabará, to American George Washington Vaughan and Maria Francisca Vaughan (née Ribeiro). Initially homeschooled by his mother, he later entered a school in Minas, and, in 1862, he moved to Rio de Janeiro to ingress at the Academia Militar das Agulhas Negras. Three years later, he quit the Military School to dedicate himself to journalism. For that, he studied Latin in the Faculdade de Direito da Universidade de São Paulo and later became a teacher there.

As a journalist, he founded and wrote for O Sorocabano in Sorocaba; wrote for A Procelária and O Rebate in São Paulo, and also to O Estado de S. Paulo, Diário Mercantil, A Gazeta de Campinas and the Almanaque de São Paulo, where he published his studies on Philology.

He published his controversial and heavily erotic romance A Carne (The Flesh) in 1888. At the time of its publication, it was panned by critics such as José Veríssimo and Alfredo Pujol. The most vehement critic, however, was the priest Sena Freitas, who wrote an article in the Diário Mercantil named A Carniça (The Carrion). Ribeiro, a strong anti-clericalist, refuted Freitas' critics with the series of articles O Urubu Sena Freitas (Sena Freitas, the Vulture). Those articles were later compiled and published under the name of Uma Polêmica Célebre, in 1934.

He died in 1890, a victim of tuberculosis.

He is the grandfather of chronicler Elsie Lessa, great-grandfather of writers Ivan Lessa and Sérgio Pinheiro Lopes and great-great-grandfather of writer Juliana Foster.

== Works ==
- O Padre Belchior de Pontes (1877)
- Gramática Portuguesa (1881)
- Cartas Sertanejas (1885)
- A Carne (1888)
- Uma Polêmica Célebre (1934 — posthumous)

== The flag of São Paulo ==
The flag of the State of São Paulo, designed by Ribeiro

On July 16, 1888, Ribeiro designed the current flag of the State of São Paulo, although he planned it to be the flag of the Republic of Brazil.

| Preceded by New creation | Brazilian Academy of Letters - Patron of the 24th chair | Succeeded by Garcia Redondo (founder) |
