= Flag of Mato Grosso do Sul =

Flag of the Brazilian state

- Use: Civil and state flag
- Proportion: 7:10
- Adopted: 1 January 1979
- Design: A white diagonal band radiating from the lower hoist-side corner to the top-center. The upper triangle is green and the lower triangle is blue with a yellow five-pointed star in the bottom-right corner.
- Designed by: Group of University of São Paulo students in the college of Architecture and Urbanism including Mauro Michael Munhoz, Vera Domschke, and Alex Flemming

The state flag of Mato Grosso do Sul was designed by a group of University of São Paulo students and adopted on 1 January 1979 by the 1st decree of the state of Mato Grosso do Sul.

== History ==
=== First flag (1977–1979) ===
From 11 October 1977 (the day of its establishment) to 1 January 1979 (the day of its recognition as a federative unit), Mato Grosso do Sul had two unofficial flags. One flag was green-white-green with "Estado do Mato Grosso do Sul" ("State of Mato Grosso do Sul") centered in the white stripe and the other was blue-white-blue with "Estado de Campo Grande" ("State of Campo Grande") centered in the white stripe with five stars in the formation of the Southern Cross in the upper-left corner. Campo Grande was an alternate name for the state of Mato Grosso do Sul.

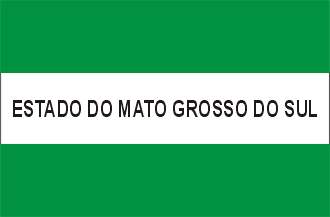
Unofficial flag used in Mato Grosso do Sul, 1977–1979.

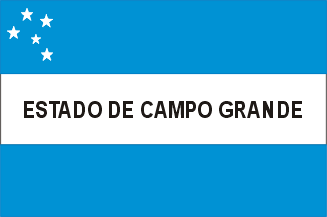
Unofficial flag for the state of Campo Grande, an alternate name for the state of Mato Grosso do Sul, 1977–1979.

=== Modern flag (1979) ===
Mockup of the state flag of Mato Grosso do Sul with an ochre field instead of blue.

A national contest was launched to collect proposed designs for the official state flag of Mato Grosso do Sul. The flag that won the contest was designed by a group of 2nd year students in the College of Architecture and Urbanism at the University of São Paulo. The students entered the contest to apply the material that they were learning in their studies. The students entered two designs into the contest and both made it to the final selection of flags.

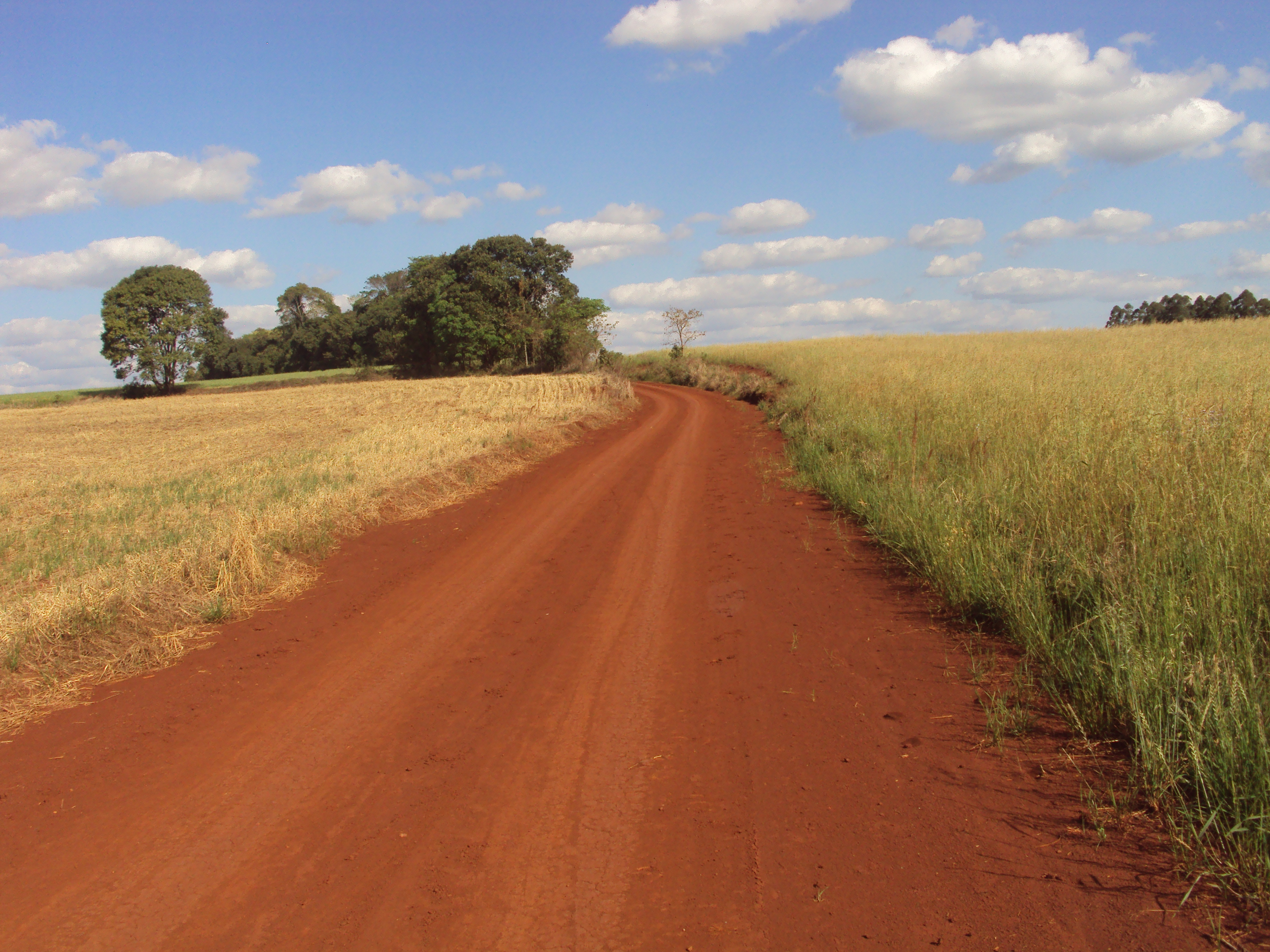
Example of Terra Roxa soil common in the state of Mato Grosso do Sul.

Despite one of their submitted designs winning the contest, their flag actually came in 2nd place. The favorite flag of the voting commission was not chosen as the contest winner as it was deemed a color-swapped plagiarization of the flags of Somalia and North Vietnam. The design of the winning flag was modified by the nationalist dictatorship-era government to change its symbolism. The blue field on the current flag was intended to be ochre by the student team to convey the importance of the red Terra Roxa soil to the agriculturally-dependent economy and rural culture of the newly founded state of Mato Grosso do Sul. The student team was told that the ochre was changed to blue as it did not conform to heraldic tincture, but the actual reason was to have the same colors as the national flag. The flag was hoisted for the first time at 6:04 PM on 31 December 1978, a few hours before Mato Grosso do Sul officially became a state.

== Symbolism ==
According to the state government of Mato Grosso do Sul, the colors on the flag symbolize the following:

- Green represents the richness of the forests and fields;
- White symbolizes peace and friendship;
- Blue represents the sky of the state of Mato Grosso and the hope of the people;
- Yellow symbolizes the wealth acquired through the people's work.

The 1st decree of the state of Mato Grosso do Sul includes the following description of the flag, accredited to Mauro Michael Munhoz.

Description of the state flag of Mato Grosso do Sul
Portuguese version	English Version
O homem, em uma de suas mais características atitudes, sempre procurou representar seus sonhos, seu ideais, suas mais caras razões de viver, através de uma simbologia que transmitisse, não só a ele, mas também aos que o rodeiam, a magnitude de tais pensamentos. Ideais trabalhados e realidade construída: bandeira, flâmula magna, símbolo máximo a pairar sobre nossa Terra, pois, aparentemente frágil em sua haste, na realidade traduz a força conjunta de toda a população de um Estado. Nosso símbolo é o do equilíbrio, da firmeza e da serenidade. Nós somos a estrela dourada que brilha no céu azul da esperança, a simbolizar a riqueza do nosso labor. As matas e os campos do nosso Estado representam um desafio, mas, ao mesmo tempo, a consciência da preservação do nosso verde, de nosso tesouro maior, que é a própria Natureza. Nós somos o Estado do equilíbrio, onde chaminés siderúrgicas e áreas florestais coexistirão pacificamente, lado a lado. Entre o verde e o azul, na convergência prática de todas as nossas atitudes, nós somos a faixa branca do porvir, a alvidez serena da amizade entre os povos.	Man, in one of his most characteristic attitudes, has always sought to represent his dreams, his ideals, his dearest reasons for living, through a symbology that would transmit, not only to him, but also to those around him, the magnitude of such thoughts. Ideals worked on and reality built: flag, majestic pennant, the ultimate symbol to hover over our Earth, because, apparently fragile in its stem, in reality it translates the joint strength of the entire population of a state. Our symbol is one of equilibrium, firmness, and serenity. We are the golden star that shines in the blue sky of hope, symbolizing the richness of our labor. The forests and fields of our state represent a challenge, but, at the same time, the consciousness of the preservation of our green, of our greatest treasure, which is Nature itself. We are the State of equilibrium, where steel mill chimneys and forest areas will peacefully coexist, side by side. Between the green and the blue, in the practical convergence of all our attitudes, we are the white belt of the future, the clear eagerness of friendship among people.

According to Munhoz, the passage describing the blue was not in their original submitted text so was altered.

== See also ==
- List of Mato Grosso do Sul state symbols
