= Flag of Goiás =

Flag of the Brazilian state of Goiás

- Use: Civil and state flag
- Proportion: 7:10
- Adopted: 30 July 1919; 107 years ago
- Design: Eight stripes: four green stripes and four yellow stripes. A blue rectangle on the upper left hoist with five white stars, four on each side and one smaller in the center.
- Designed by: João Bonifácio Gomes de Siqueira

The flag of Goiás is the official flag of the Brazilian state of Goiás. The flag was adopted on 30 July 1919 by Law No. 650 of Goiás.

== History ==
The flag was created by Joaquim Bonifácio de Siqueira and later adopted by Law No. 650 of Goiás during the governorship of João Alves de Castro.

== Symbolism ==
The color green represents the House of Braganza, the Portuguese royal family of Emperor Dom Pedro I. The color yellow represents the House of Habsburg, the Austrian family of Empress Maria Leopoldina of Austria, first wife of Dom Pedro I. And the five white stars in the upper left hoist represent the Southern Cross. The Southern Cross was the constellation that gave Brazil its primitive names, Ilha de Vera Cruz and Terra de Santa Cruz.

== See also ==
- List of Goiás state symbols
