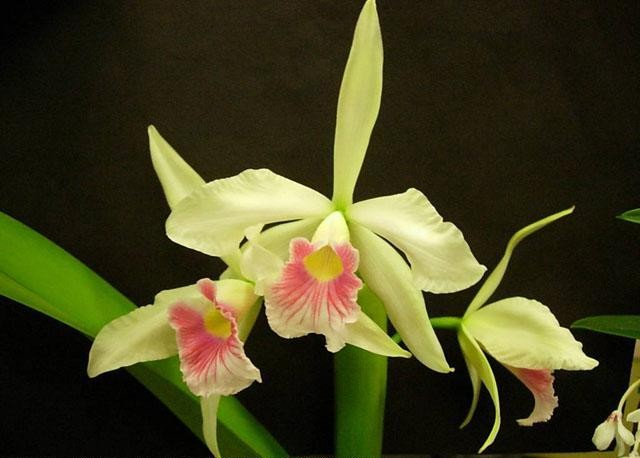

Scientific classification
- Kingdom: Plantae
- Clade: Tracheophytes
- Clade: Angiosperms
- Clade: Monocots
- Order: Asparagales
- Family: Orchidaceae
- Subfamily: Epidendroideae
- Genus: Cattleya
- Subgenus: Cattleya subg. Cattleya
- Section: Cattleya sect. Crispae
- Species: C. purpurata

Binomial name
- Cattleya purpurata (Lindl. & Paxton) Rollisson ex Lindl.

Synonyms
- List: Amalia purpurea Heynh.; Laelia purpurata Lindl. & Paxton; Cattleya brysiana Lem.; Laelia purpurata var. praetexta Rchb.f.; Laelia casperiana Rchb.f.; Bletia casperiana (Rchb.f.) Rchb.f.; Bletia purpurata (Lindl. & Paxton) Rchb.f.; Bletia purpurata var. aurorea Rchb.f.; Bletia purpurata var. pallida Rchb.f.; Bletia purpurata var. praetexta (Rchb.f.) Rchb.f.; Laelia purpurata var. nelisii Lem.; Laelia purpurata var. rosea Regel; Laelia russelliana B.S.Williams; Laelia purpurata var. russelliana (B.S.Williams) B.S.Williams; Laelia purpurata var. blenheimense R.Warner & B.S.Williams; Laelia purpurata var. virginalis L.C.Menezes; Sophronitis purpurata (Lindl. & Paxton) Van den Berg & M.W.Chase; Hadrolaelia purpurata (Lindl. & Paxton) Chiron & V.P.Castro; Hadrolaelia purpurata f. virginalis (L.C.Menezes) F.Barros & J.A.N.Bat.; Brasilaelia purpurata (Lindl. & Paxton) Campacci; Chironiella purpurata (Lindl. & Paxton) Braem; Cattleya purpurata var. blenheimense R.Warner & B.S.Williams) K.A.Roberts; Cattleya purpurata var. nelisii (Lem.) K.A.Roberts; Cattleya purpurata var. praetexta (Rchb.f.) K.A.Roberts; Cattleya purpurata var. rosea (Regel) K.A.Roberts; Cattleya purpurata var. russelliana (B.S.Williams) K.A.Roberts; Cattleya purpurata var. virginalis (L.C.Menezes) K.A.Roberts

= Cattleya purpurata =

Species of orchid

Cattleya purpurata, known in the past as Laelia purpurata and Sophronitis purpurata, is native to Brazil where it is very popular among orchid growers. It is an epiphyte that is found in the canopy of tall trees near coastal areas, in the Brazilian states of Rio Grande do Sul, Santa Catarina and São Paulo. The orchid favors bright light and cool to warm conditions and is relatively easy to cultivate. C. purpurata has been used extensively as a parent in hybridizing with Cattleyas. Cattleya purpurata blooms from late spring to fall with three to five flowers on a spike. The flowers are long-lasting and fragrant.

== Horticultural forms ==
- C. purpurata f. alba; white lip, sepals and petals
- C. purpurata f. carnea; pink lip, white sepals and petals
- C. purpurata f. flammea; magenta lip, pink sepals and white petals
- C. purpurata f. oculata; purple patches on lip, white sepals and petals
- C. purpurata f. roxo-violeta; light reddish purple lip, white sepals and petals
- C. purpurata f. rubra; magenta lip, pink sepals and petals
- C. purpurata f. sanguinea; magenta lip, sepals and petals
- C. purpurata f. striata; magenta lip, pink vein pattern sepals and petals
- C. purpurata f. vagnota; dark red lip, white sepals and petals
- C. purpurata f. vinicolor; dark red lip with small white patch at the end, white sepals and petals
- C. purpurata f. werkhaeuserii; light bluish lip, white sepals and petals
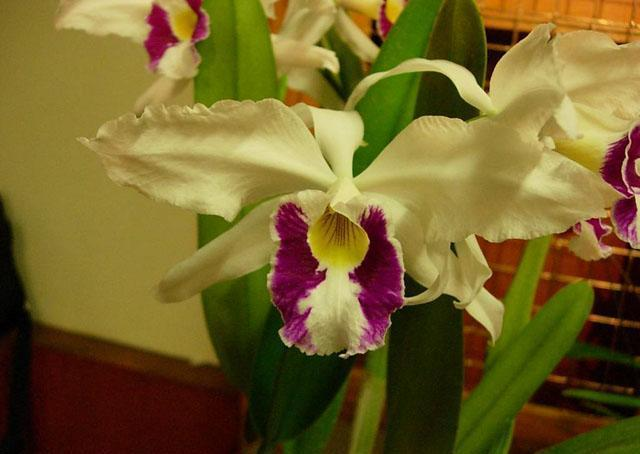
Cattleya purpurata var. oculata

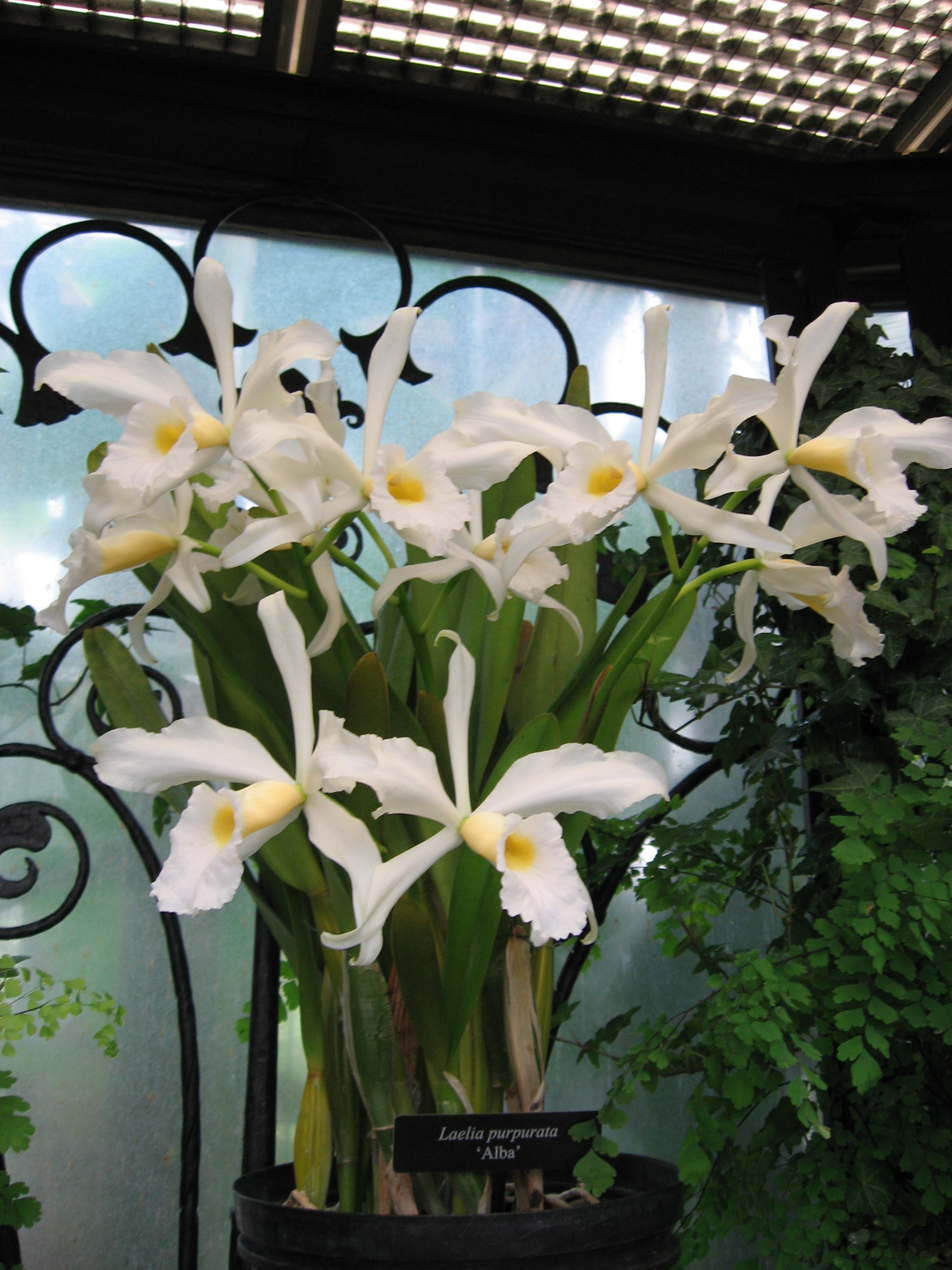
Cattleya purpurata f. alba

== Hybrids ==
Cattleya × elegans is a hybrid orchid with a formula hybridae Cattleya purpurata (Lindl. & Paxton) Van den Berg (2008) × Cattleya tigrina A.Rich. (1848). It is found in South and South-East Brazil.
