= Flag of Piauí =

- Use: Civil and state flag
- Proportion: 7:10
- Adopted: 24 July 1922

The flag of Piauí is one of the official symbols to the state of Piauí, in Brazil.

== History ==
The flag was adopted by the Lei nº 1.050, of 24 July 1922, and was amended by the Lei ordinária no 5.507, of 17 November 2005.

== Vexillology ==
Its drawing consists of a rectangle with the proportions 7:3, divided in thirteen interspersed green and yellow stripes with the same length. In the upper right corner there is a dark blue canton with the length equal to five stripes with a white star in the middle. Below the star, it is written with white letters: "13 DE MARÇO DE 1823" (13 March 1823).

=== Colors ===
The colors used on the flag (green, yellow, blue and white), don't have an official shading level. However, the manual of visual identity of the government of the Piauí state specifies the following colors:

Color	Name	CMYK	sRGB	Hexadecimal	Pantone
	Blue	100/0/70/0	11/16/151	0B1097	294C (brilho), 288M (fosco)
	Green	70/0/100/10	86/161/52	56A134	362C (brilho), 369M (fosco)
	Yellow	15/100/0/0	255/213/0	FFD500	108C (brilho), 109M (fosco)
	White	0/0/0/0	255/255/255	FFFFFF	

=== Symbolism ===
The main colors of the flag are the same as in the Flag of Brazil and are one representation of the integration of the state with Brazil. Each color has a specific meaning:

- Yellow represents the mineral wealth;
- Green represents hope.

Alongside the colors, other elements in the flag also represent:

- The star represents Antares, which in the Brazilian flag symbolizes the state of Piauí;
- The inscription inside the blue rectangle: "13 DE MARÇO DE 1823", introduced in the 2005 change of the flag, was the day of the Battle of Jenipapo, in the state's territory.

== Historical flags ==
Unofficial flag of the Piauí province, used until July 24, 1922.

Older flag of Piauí, used from July 24, 1922, to 1937, and 1946 to 2005.

Reverse of the flag.

== See also ==
- List of Piauí state symbols
