= Flag of Rondônia =

Flag of the Brazilian state of Rondônia

- Use: Civil and state flag
- Proportion: 7:10
- Adopted: 31 December 1981
- Design: A blue field occupies its upper half with a central white star with five equidistant points in the middle of the banner. A green field is formed from the lower edges of the banner to the center of the lower points of the star. Two yellow fields are formed to the right and to the left of the star.
- Designed by: Sílvio Carvajal Feitosa

The flag of Rondônia is the official flag of the Brazilian state of Rondônia. The current flag was introduced by the 7th Decree of the state of Rondônia on 31 December 1981, a mere 9 days after Rondônia was elevated from a federal territory to a state.

== History ==
The current flag was created by 17-year-old Sílvio Carvajal Feitosa and was chosen in a contest created by the state government to choose its symbols. One of the requirements of the contest was that the proposed state flag use the same colors as the national flag.

== Symbolism ==
The design of the flag is a stylistic representation of Rondônia as "the newest star shining in the sky of the Union". The star is Muliphein, a star in the constellation Canis Major, which is the star on the Brazilian Flag that represents Rondônia. The blue upper half of the flag represents the sky, whereas the lower half is a perspective view of the land. The green portion is a representation of the roads that led to the development of the state through strong migration into the state during the 1970s and resource extraction out of the state. These resources are represented by the yellow portions of the flag.

== See also ==
- List of Rondônia state symbols
