= Lessa (Argolis) =

Coordinates: 37°35′49″N 22°56′34″E

Lessa (Ancient Greek: Λῆσσα) was a village of ancient Argolis, part of Epidauria, upon the confines of the territory of Argos, and at the foot of Mount Arachnaeum (τὸ Ἀραχναῖον ὄρος). Pausanias, when visiting there in the 2nd century, saw there a temple of Athena.

Its site is located near the modern Kazarma.
