= Flag of Santa Catarina =

Flag of the Brazilian state of Santa Catarina

- Use: Civil and state flag
- Proportion: 8:11
- Adopted: 29 October 1953; 73 years ago
- Design: A red and white horizontal tricolour, with a lime green lozenge in the centre featuring the coat of arms
- Designed by: Irineu Bornhausen

The flag of Santa Catarina is the official flag of the Brazilian state of Santa Catarina. The flag was adopted on 29 October 1953 by State Law No. 975 under governor Irinieu Bornhausen.

Flag of Santa Catarina, used between August 15, 1895, and November 10, 1937

== History ==
The original flag of Santa Catarina, was adopted by State Law No. 126 on August 15, 1895, and stayed the state flag until 1937 when under the leadership of Getúlio Vargas, the use of state symbols was banned under the Brazilian Constitution of 1937. When a state flag was reinstated, the current design was adopted.

== Symbolism ==
There is no official explanation for the symbolism of red and white on the flag. However the lime green lozenge symbolizes Saint Catherine of Alexandria, the patron saint of Santa Catarina.

== Gallery ==
Flag of Juliana Republic (1839)

Flag of the province of Santa Catarina (until 1891).

Flag of the people of Santa Catarina in the Contestado War (1912–1915)

Possible Second Flag of Santa Catarina (1937)

== See also ==
- List of Santa Catarina state symbols
