= Flag of Espírito Santo =

Flag of the Brazilian state of Espírito Santo

- Use: Civil and state flag
- Proportion: 7:10
- Adopted: 24 April 1947; 79 years ago
- Design: A horizontal tricolor of light blue, white, and pink; charged with "TRABALHA E CONFIA" (Portuguese for "Work and Trust"), centered on the white stripe.
- Designed by: Jerônimo de Sousa Monteiro

The flag of Espírito Santo is the official flag of the Brazilian state of Espírito Santo. The current flag was designed in 1908 and officially adopted on 24 April 1947 through Decree 16.618 of the state of Espírito Santo. Like the state's coat of arms, the flag of Espírito Santo is rare in its use of the colour pink outside of any graphic in a coat of arms or a symbol. The coat of arms is also primarily pink and blue.

== History ==
Flag of the province of Espírito Santo (1821 – 1889)

Before the proclamation of the First Brazilian Republic, when Espírito Santo was a province of the Empire of Brazil, it had an unofficial blue and red vertical bicolor as its flag. This was inspired by the flag of France.

The modern flag was created in 1908 by Jerônimo de Sousa Monteiro, the governor of Espírito Santo, to strengthen the identity of the state during a period of modernization and industrialization. He established blue, white, and pink as the official state colors on 7 September 1909. The flag was then adopted on 24 April 1947 through Decree 16.618 of the state of Espírito Santo.

In 1989, Paulo Fundão, the public relations officer of the now-defunct Vitória Iron and Steel Company, led a campaign to change the pink of the flag to red. He believed that secondary colors were not appropriate to be used in flags. This met strong resistance from both state residents and politicians alike, which led Max Mauro, the then governor, to reject Fundão's proposition.

== Symbolism ==
The color and text on the flag come from Espírito Santo's strong Catholic history and identity. The colors on the flag are inspired by the mantle of Our Lady of Victory, the patron saint of the state capital of Vitória. The blue represents harmony, the white represents peace, and pink represents happiness. The text on the flag, "TRABALHA E CONFIA" (lit. 'Work and Trust'), is derived from the doctrine of St. Ignatius of Loyola, the founder of the Society of Jesus, who said "Trabalha como se tudo dependesse de ti e confia como se tudo dependesse de Deus" (English: Work as if everything depended on you and trust as if everything depended on God).

== See also ==
- List of Espírito Santo state symbols
