= Flag of Sergipe =

Sergipe

The civil and state flag of the Brazilian state of Sergipe consists of four alternating green and yellow horizontal stripes with a square blue canton featuring five white five-pointed stars. It was officially adopted on 3 December 1952.

== History ==
The flag design came into being when José Rodrigues Bastos Coelho, a late 19th century merchant from Sergipe, needed a flag to identify the state of origin of his ships, and designed the flag, originally with only four stars to represent four estuaries in Sergipe. The flag quickly became identified with Sergipe, and was officially adopted as the flag of the state on 19 October 1920, with five stars to more accurately represent Sergipe's five estuaries. In 1937, under the leadership of Getúlio Vargas, all state symbols were banned under the Brazilian Constitution of 1937. In 1951, the flag was reinstated with 42 stars to represent Sergipe's 42 municipalities at the time, but this was changed the following year to the original design on 3 December 1952.

== Symbolism ==
The five stars represent the five estuaries of Sergipe; in the 1952 declaration, the rivers that were represented were the Sergipe, São Francisco, Real, Vaza-Barris, and Japaratuba. However the state government site also lists the Piauí as one of those represented. The green and yellow represent integration with Brazil.

== Gallery ==
Unofficial flag of the province of Sergipe, used until 1920.

Flag of the state of Sergipe used between October 30, 1951, and December 3, 1952.

== See also ==
- List of Sergipe state symbols
