= Flag of Tocantins =

- Use: Civil and state flag
- Proportion: 7:10
- Adopted: 17 November 1989; 37 years ago
- Design: A white diagonal band charged with a gold sun radiating from the lower hoist-side corner. The upper triangle is blue and the lower triangle is yellow.

The state flag of the Brazilian state of Tocantins was adopted on 17 November 1989 by State law nº 94/89 of Tocantins.

== History ==
=== Separatist movement (1956) ===
Tocantins was created from the northern portion of the state of Goiás on 1 January 1989, but several separatist movements vouched for its creation throughout Brazil's history. One such movement adopted a flag with thirteen alternating green and white horizontal stripes with a diagonal red bar with "Velo" (Portuguese: To look after) in the center to represent the proposed state's ambition to look after the best interests of the nation.

Proposed flag for an independent state of Tocantins, 1956

=== Proposed flag (1987 – 1988) ===
Raimundo Marinho, former mayor of the municipality of Araguaína, created a flag proposal for the flag of Tocantins that was presented alongside the remarks of CONORTE during the 1988 Constituent Assembly.

Proposed flag for the future state of Tocantins, 1987 – 1988

=== Modern flag (1989) ===
The modern state flag was adopted on 17 November 1989 by State law nº 94/89 during the governorship of Siqueira Campos.

== Symbolism ==
The yellow-gold sun in the center of the flag represents how Tocantins is a land where the sun rises for everyone. The white bar represents the cultivation of peace. The blue bar represents the state's water sources, whereas the gold bar represents gold and the mineral wealth of the state.

== See also ==
- List of Tocantins state symbols
