= Flag of Rio Grande do Sul =

Flag of the Brazilian state of Rio Grande do Sul

Rio Grande do Sul

The flag of Rio Grande do Sul is the official flag of the Brazilian state of Rio Grande do Sul.

== History ==
The state flag originated from the flag of the Riograndense Republic, which seceded from Brazil from 1836 to 1845. The flag of the republic was created in a decree from November 12, 1836, which described the flag, which was originally square in shape and lacking the coat of arms in the centre. The state flag was officially adopted on in 1889, and in 1891 the flag was altered to include the shield. It stayed the state flag until 1937 when under the leadership of Getúlio Vargas, the use of state symbols was banned under the Brazilian Constitution of 1937. The flag was re-adopted on January 5, 1966.

== Symbolism ==
The symbolism of the flag is controversial. There are many suggestions for the meaning of the colours of the flag including that the green and yellow represent Brazil, with the red representing war. Another suggested meaning is that the green represents the forests of Pampas, the red symbolizes revolution and courage, and the yellow represents riches.

== Gallery ==
Flag of the Riograndense Republic

Flag of the Governor of Rio Grande do Sul

== See also ==
- List of Rio Grande do Sul state symbols
