= Flag of São Paulo (state) =

Flag of the Brazilian state of São Paulo

- Obverse side of the flag
- Use: Civil and state flag
- Proportion: 2:3
- Adopted: 27 November 1946; 79 years ago
- Design: 13 stripes of alternating black and white, with a red canton on the upper left corner. Inside the canton, a yellow star in each corner and a white circle in the middle with a blue map of Brazil.
- Designed by: Júlio Ribeiro and Amador Amaral
- Reverse side of the São Paulo flag
- Use: Civil and state flag
- Design: The reverse side of the flag. The canton and stripes mirror the obverse side, but the map of Brazil is not mirrored.

The flag of the state of São Paulo, Brazil, serves as one of the state's symbols, along with the state's coat of arms and anthem. It was designed by the philologist and writer Júlio Ribeiro in 1888, with his brother-in-law, Amador Amaral, a graphic artist. The flag has thirteen black and white stripes and a red rectangle in the upper left corner holding a white circle enclosing an outline map of Brazil in blue. There is a yellow star in each corner of the red rectangle.

Originally intended for the entire country, the flag became the de facto symbol of the state of São Paulo after the constitutionalist revolution of 1932, but was only adopted officially in 1946 after the new federal constitution gave the states and municipalities the right to create their own symbols of flags, seals/coats of arms.

== History ==
In the last years 1870s and 1880s of the Empire of Brazil (1822–1889), many supporters of a republic created different designs for a national flag to be adopted for the new republic. For most of them, it was necessary to eliminate all the symbols that represented the imperial monarchy and the monarchic institutions. The republican writer and journalist Júlio Ribeiro, founder and editor of the newspaper "O Rebate", published in its first edition on 16 July 1888, a series of criticisms of the green and yellow (gold) imperial standard. He also presented his own idea for a republican flag. According to him, his design:

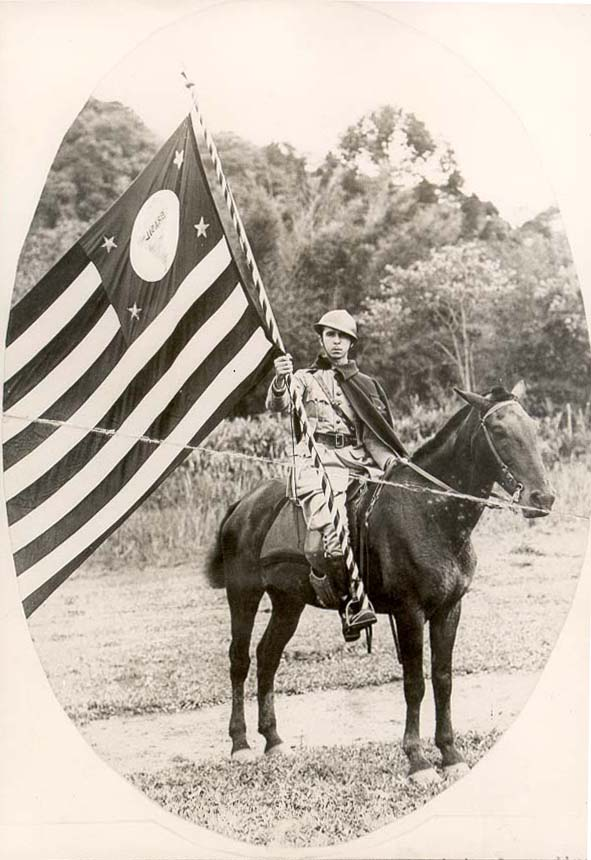
São Paulo volunteer at the Revolução Constitucionalista de 1932

...symbolizes in a perfect way the genesis of the Brazilian people, the three races of which it is composed – white, black and red. The four stars surrounding a globe, in which we see the geographical profile of the country, represent the Southern Cross, the constellation indicative of our astral latitude ... So, stand firm, let flutter the glorious Black-And-White Pendant of the Cross!

— Júlio Ribeiro

This flag was hoisted above the governor's palace in São Paulo on November 15th, 1889, to celebrate the first days of the new republic. However four days later, on 19 November 1889, under Decree No. 4 of the Provisional Government, Brazil officially adopted a different flag, one designed by Raimundo Teixeira Mendes and with similar colors to the previous imperial one of seven decades.

Ribeiro's design then came over the subsequent decades to be considered the "flag of São Paulo". It was used to decorate building facades or as a decorative object but without any official status. It became a de facto symbol of the state of São Paulo after the 1932 Revolution in the early years of the Vargas Era in Brazil, during which President Getúlio Vargas had suspended the use of state symbols, including the flag of São Paulo. The flag finally achieved official status on November 27, 1946, under Decree-Law 16.349 of the new federal constitution, which gave the states the right to provincial symbols such as flags, colours, seals, coats of arms and logos.

However, Ribeiro's flag did not escape criticism. Afonso d'Escragnolle Taunay wrote of it in 1931, before the flag had received official recognition:

...ugly dreadful symbol, from the times of republican propaganda, the flag that is the invention of Júlio Ribeiro, the improperly called 'Paulista flag', lugubrious, unaesthetic, insignificant. Thank God it was never official, but unfortunately it is very much adopted... this black-and-white mortuary cloth... it attributes to the population of São Paulo a dosage of entirely false African blood, since in the lands of São Paulo the percentage of Euro-Americans was immensely higher than the dosage of Afro, African and African-American elements.

— Afonso d'Escragnolle Taunay

== Characteristics ==
=== Legal description: dimensions and construction ===
Annex 2 to law 145 (1948), with the specifications for the flag.

The exact description of the flag is given by Article 2 of law no. 145 of 1948, still in force:

Article number 2. The making of the Flag of the State of São Paulo will obey the following norms, as shown graphically in annex 2:

I – To calculate the dimensions, the desired width shall be taken as the base, divided into thirteen equal parts, each part constituting a unit;
II – The length shall be 19.5 (nineteen and a half) units, the other elements having the following proportions:

a) Stripes: 1 (one) unit width for each stripe;
b) Canton: 7.5 (seven and a half) unit of length by 5 (five) units wide;
c) Circle: 4 (four) units in diameter;
d) Geographic silhouette: Inscribed in an imaginary circle of 3.5 (three and a half) units in diameter and concentric to the Circle.
e) Stars: Inscribed in an imaginary circle of 1.5 (one and a half) units in diameter, whose center is located 1 (one) unit away from the edges of the canton.

III – The indication of gold and silver metals, in any fabric in which the flag is made, shall be made by yellow and white, respectively.

=== Colours ===
The colours used in the flag (black, white, blue, yellow and red) do not have precisely defined shades in the law. However, the manual of visual identity of the government of the state of São Paulo specifies the following colours:

Colours	CMYK	RGB	Hexadecimal	Pantone
	0/0/0/100	33/33/37	212125	Black C
	0/100/100/0	196/0/8	C40008	485 C
	0/0/100/0	255/236/0	FFEC00	Yellow C
	100/80/0/0	41/66/146	294292	286 C
	0/0/0/0	255/255/255	FFFFFF	

Because of the flag, the colors that symbolise the state of São Paulo are black, red and white.

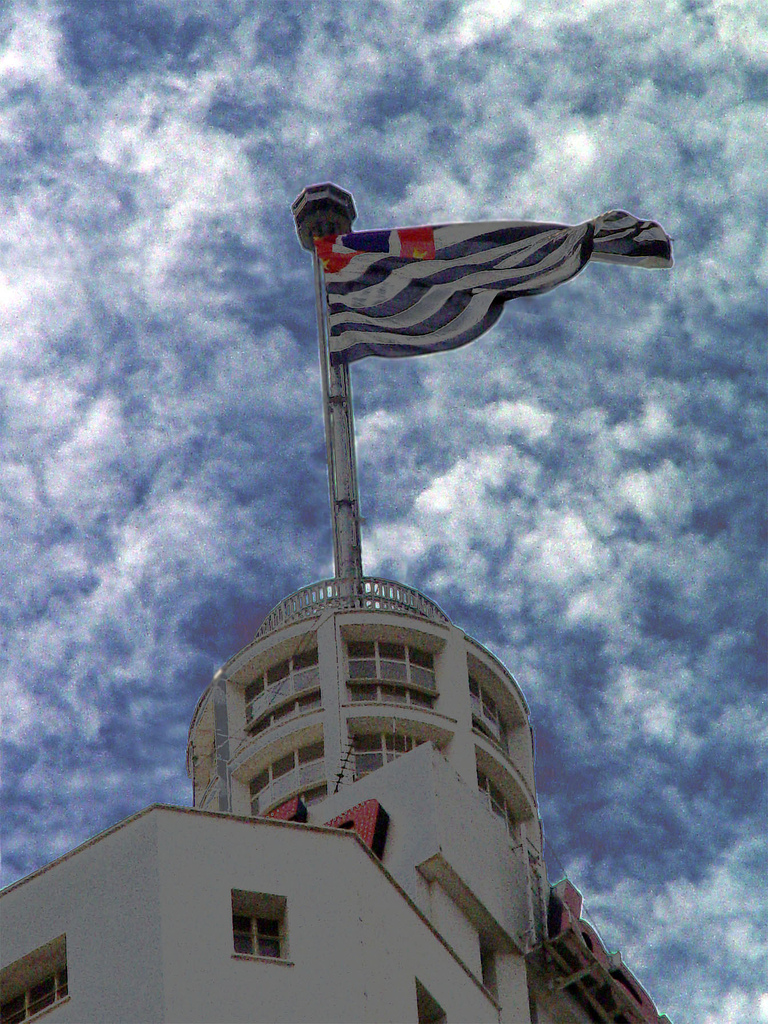
The flag of São Paulo on the top of the Altino Arantes Building, in São Paulo

=== Meaning ===
The flag has thirteen stripes alternating between black and white, representing the days and nights that the bandeirantes fought for the good of the state. The top and bottom stripes are both black, so the edges are clearly delimited.

The canton consists of a red rectangle on the upper left corner, representing the blood shed by the bandeirantes. The white circle contains an outline of Brazil in blue, the colour of strength, which the bandeirantes brought to the state. There is a yellow star on the inside of each corner of the rectangle.

On the reverse flag, the only difference is that the rectangle is aligned on the top-right; the outline of Brazil stays the same as on the obverse.

According to the flag's creator, Júlio Ribeiro, writing in O Rebate on 16 July 1888, the red, black and white colors symbolize, respectively, the three constituent races of the Brazilian people: Amerindians, blacks, and whites. This references a theory advanced by Carl Friedrich Philipp von Martius who wrote Como se deve escrever a história do Brasil (1840). Von Martius's theory of three races also influences the design of other Brazilian flags, such as the state of Maranhão. Again according to Ribeiro in O Rebate, the four yellow stars represent the Southern Cross.

== Related flags ==
Flag of the governor of São Paulo.

Unofficial flag of the São Paulo Province (to 1891).

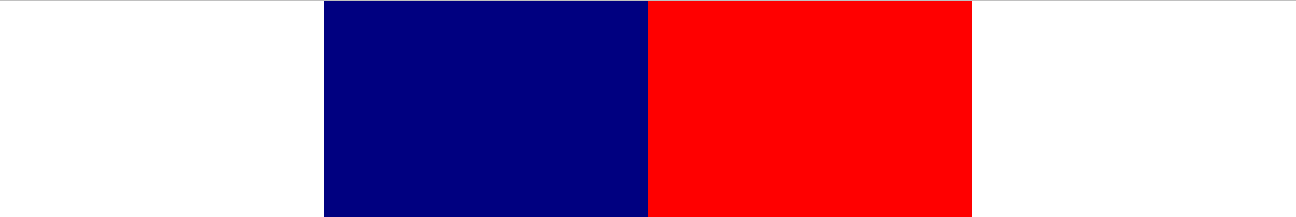
Pennant of the São Paulo Province (c.1850 - 1891).

== See also ==
- Constitutionalist Revolution
- List of São Paulo state symbols
