= Orígenes Lessa =

Brazilian writer (1903–1986)

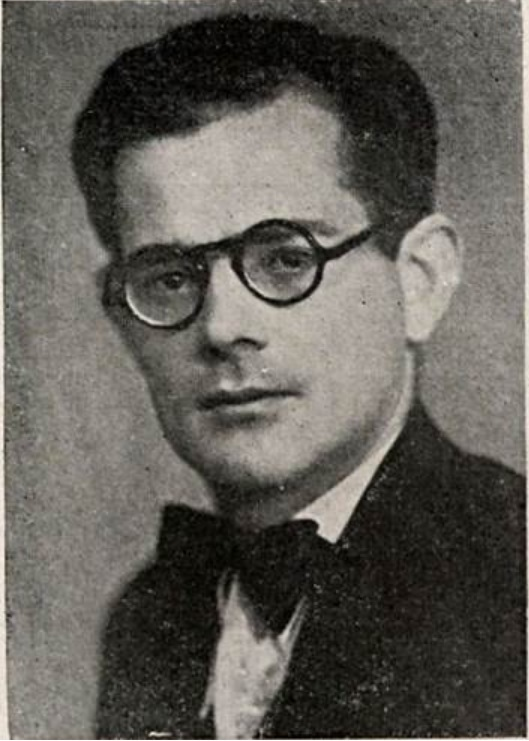
- Orígenes Lessa (1935)
- Born: July 12, 1903 Lençóis Paulista, Brazil
- Died: July 13, 1986 (aged 83) Rio de Janeiro, Brazil
- Occupation: Journalist, writer, educator
- Notable works: O Feijão e o Sonho
- Spouse: Elsie Lessa
- Children: Ivan Lessa

Orígenes Lessa (July 12, 1903 in Lençóis Paulista – July 13, 1986 in Rio de Janeiro), journalist, short story writer, novelist, and an essayist. He was elected, on July 9, 1981 for the Chair number 10 of the Brazilian Academy of Letters, succeeding Osvaldo Orico, and was received on November 20, 1981, by the Academy Member Francisco de Assis Barbosa.

== His life ==
Lessa was a son of Vicente Themudo Lessa, historian, journalist and a Protestant pastor from the State of Pernambuco, and of Henriqueta Pinheiro Themudo Lessa. In 1906, he was taken by his family to São Luís in the State of Maranhão, where he stayed until the age 9, following his father's journey as a missionary. From the experience of his childhood resulted the novel Rua do Sol (Street of the Sun). In 1912, he returned to São Paulo. At the age 19, he entered a Protestant seminar, which he left two years later.

In 1924, he moved to Rio de Janeiro. Voluntarily separated from his family, he faced great difficulties. In order to support himself he became a teacher. He finished a physical education course, become a calisthenics teacher of the Physical Education Institute of the YMCA. He entered the newspaper life, publishing his first articles in the section "Social-Worker Tribune" of the newspaper O Imparcial. He was married to the writer Elsie Lessa. Their only son is the writer and journalist Ivan Lessa. He was the grandfather of the writer Juliana Foster and also an uncle of the writer and translator Sergio Pinheiro Lopes.

== Published books ==
=== Novels ===
- O Feijão e o Sonho (1938);
- A desintegração da morte, novel (1948);
- Rua do Sol, novel (1955);
- João Simões continua, novel (1959);
- A noite sem homem, novel (1968);
- Beco da fome, novel (1972);
- O evangelho de Lázaro, novel (1972);
- O edifício fantasma, novel (1984);
- Simão Cireneu, novel (1986).

=== Short stories ===
- O escritor proibido (1929);
- Garçon, garçonnette, garçonnière (1930);
- A cidade que o diabo esqueceu (1931);
- Passa-três (1935);
- Omelete em Bombaim (1946);
- Balbino, o homem do mar (1960);
- Histórias urbanas (1963);
- Nove mulheres (1968);
- Um rosto perdido (1979);
- Mulher nua na calçada (1984).

=== News reports ===
- Não há de ser nada (1932);
- Ilha Grande (1933);
- Ok, América (1945);
- Oásis na mata (1956).

=== Essays ===
- Getúlio Vargas na literatura de cordel (1973);
- O índio cor-de-rosa. Evocação de Noel Nutels (1985);
- Inácio da Catingueira e Luís Gama, dois poetas negros contra o racismo dos mestiços (1982);
- A voz dos poetas (1984).

=== Children's literature ===
- O sonho de Prequeté (1934);
- Memórias de um cabo de vassoura (1971);
- Napoleão em Parada de Lucas (1971 ou 1972)
- Sequestro em Parada de Lucas (1972);
- Memórias de um fusca (1972);
- Napoleão ataca outra vez (1972);
- A escada de nuvens (1972);
- Confissões de um vira-lata (1972);
- A floresta azul (1972);
- O mundo é assim, Taubaté (1976);
- É conversando que as coisas se entendem (1978);
- Tempo quente na floresta azul (1983).

Preceded by Osvaldo Orico	Brazilian Academy of Letters - Occupant of the 10th chair 1981 — 1986	Succeeded by Lêdo Ivo
