= Ivan Lessa =

Brazilian writer

Ivan Lesa
- Born: May 9, 1935; São Paulo, Brazil
- Died: June 8, 2012 (aged 77); London, England
- Parent(s): Elsie Lessa and Orígenes Lessa
- Writing career
- Pen name: Edélsio Tavares

Ivan Pinheiro Themudo Lessa (May 9, 1935 – June 8, 2012) was a Brazilian journalist and writer of American descent.

== Early life ==
Born in São Paulo, he was the son of the journalist and writer Elsie Lessa and the writer Orígenes Lessa and the father of the British writer Juliana Foster.

== Career ==
Lessa edited and wrote for the newspaper O Pasquim, in which he authored the sections "Gip-Gip-Nheco-Nheco", "Fotonovelas" (Photo-soap-operas) and "Os Diários de Londres" (The London Journals), written in 'partnership' with his heteronym "Edélsio Tavares".

He published three books: Garotos da Fuzarca (Rogue Lads, short stories, 1986), Ivan Vê o Mundo (Ivan Sees the World, 1999) and O Luar e a Rainha (The Moonlight and the Queen, 2005). He also translated Truman Capote's In Cold Blood to Portuguese.

== Personal life ==
For many years Lessa lived in London, where he wrote and broadcast for the Brazilian BBC news website.

== Death ==
Lessa died on June 8, 2012, from pulmonary emphysema in London.
