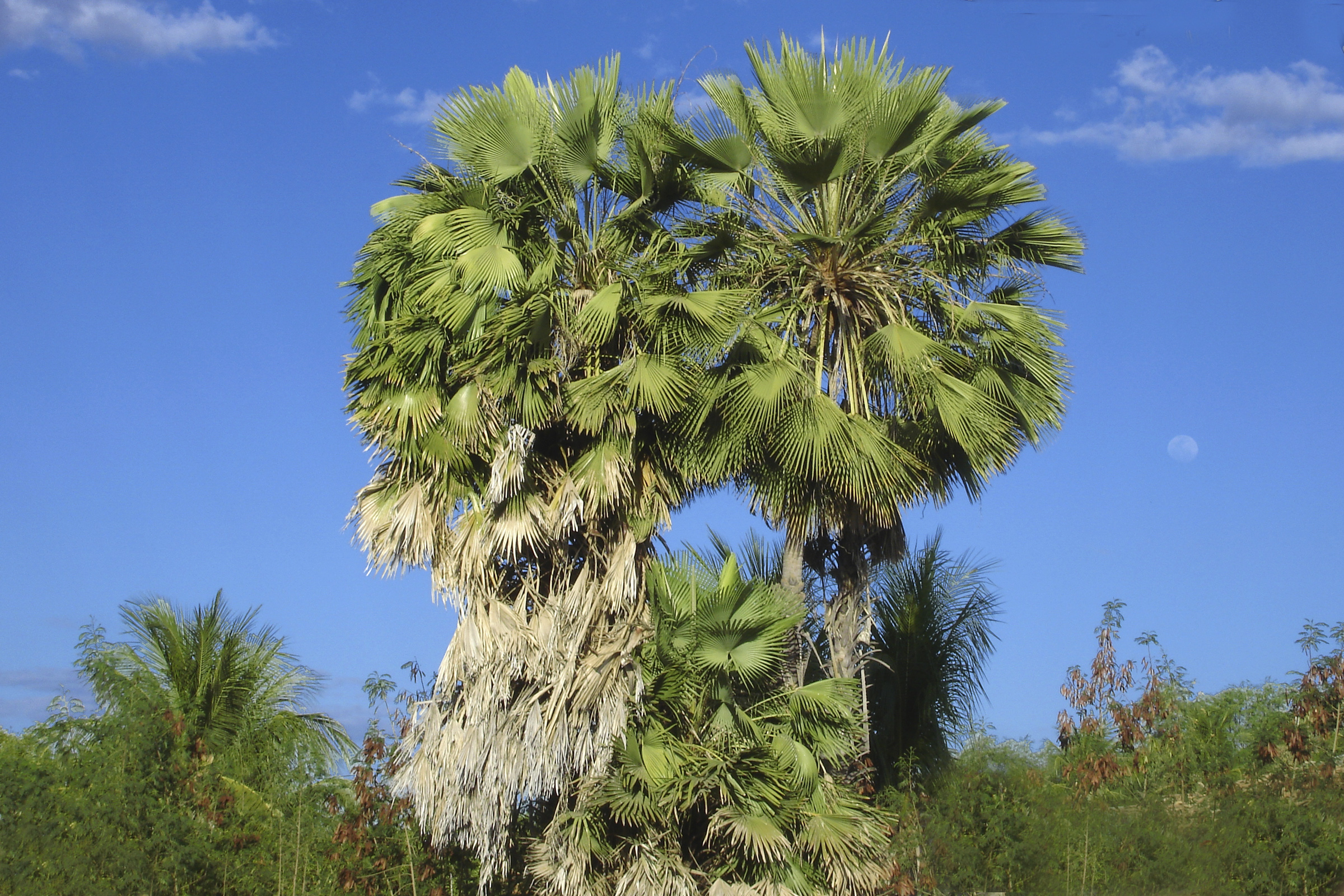

Scientific classification
- Kingdom: Plantae
- Clade: Embryophytes
- Clade: Tracheophytes
- Clade: Angiosperms
- Clade: Monocots
- Clade: Commelinids
- Order: Arecales
- Family: Arecaceae
- Tribe: Trachycarpeae
- Genus: Copernicia
- Species: C. prunifera

Binomial name
- Copernicia prunifera (Mill.) H.Moore

Synonyms
- Arrudaria cerifera (Arruda) Macedo; Copernicia cerifera (Arruda) Mart.; Corypha cerifera Arruda; Palma prunifera Mill.

= Copernicia prunifera =

Carnauba palm

Species of palm

Copernicia prunifera or the carnaúba palm or carnaubeira palm (Portuguese pronunciation: [kaʁnaˈubɐ]) is a species of palm tree native to northeastern Brazil (mainly the states of Ceará, Piauí, Maranhão, Rio Grande do Norte and Bahia). Known by many as 'tree of life' because of its many uses, the Carnaúba is also the symbol tree of Ceará. The initiative to use it as a symbol vies to promote its conservation and sustainable use.

== Plant description ==
Copernica prunifera can grow up to 20 m height with an average 25 cm diameter trunk, circular tree crown, with fan-leaves measuring 1.5 m, bisexual flowers and small black round fruits (2.5 cm). The palm can live up to 200 years. Although it withstands drought well, it has a high water requirement for growth. A slightly saline composition in the soil produces the best trees. Carnaubas are social palm trees, they are found in Carnaubais (assembly/group of Carnaubas) in flood zones or near rivers. Taxonomically, this tree belongs to the subfamily Coryphoideae, tribe Corypheae, subtribe Livistoninae.

== Biodiversity ==
The Carnauba palm tree is an endemic species to the Caatinga, an exclusive Brazilian biome, comprising a total area of 826,411 km². The latter is present in eight of the nine Northeastern states: Piauí, Ceará, Rio Grande do Norte, Paraíba, Pernambuco, Alagoas, Sergipe, Bahia, and it is also present in a northern strip of Minas Gerais. Caatinga covers approximately 10% of the national territory and 70% of the Northeast region, and borders with three other biomes in the country, the Amazon rainforest, the Atlantic Forest, and Cerrado savanna. A semiarid climate prevails in the Caatinga, with approximately 800 mm of poorly distributed rainfall per year, resulting in long periods of drought. The carnauba palm tree, is an easily adaptable species and, thus, is spread over large territories, greatly impacting the locations. Besides economic and cultural impacts, it has a remarkable ecological influence of this northeastern palm on the environments. The fact that the carnauba palm tree is a species that grows along rivers and streams in general, helps to prevent siltation in the water bodies and to control soil erosion in the areas where it is located. The fruits of the carnauba palm tree serve as food for animals such as bats, pigs, wild hogs and some Psittacidae (parrots and parakeets), one of the best assisting factors in spreading the seeds of this species. Bees also consume nectar and pollen from its flowers to make honey, helping to pollinate this species. Nevertheless, the relationship between the carnauba palm tree and animals is not limited to feeding, but is also related to aiding migration processes and balancing the ecosystem. Birds, for example, often use this palm tree to nest and rest when flocking.

== Uses ==
It is the source of carnauba wax, which is harvested as a natural coating from the surface of the leaves of the tree. The fruit and pith are eaten, the leaves are variously utilized and the wood is a construction material.

=== Edible parts ===
Carnauba produces several materials that have versatile applications. Its fruits can be used as feed to cattle, donkeys, goats and pigs or can also be used to produce jelly for human consumption. The pulp is extracted and dried to produce carnauba flour, largely consumed by natives. Cooking oil can be extracted from the seeds, which are also edible. When roasted, fruits are ground and brewed to make a drink that can be used as a substitute for coffee.

=== Carnauba wax ===
The most important product of the Carnauba tree is the wax extracted from its leaves. It can be used in floor, leather, furniture, car and shoe polish, and is used in the manufacture of carbon paper, candles, chalk, matches, soap and woodwork stains. It consists of myricyl cerotate and small quantities of cerotic acid and myricyl alcohol.

After harvesting, the leaves are left upon the field to dry under the sun. The thin layer of wax coating plant material disintegrates into a powder, which is then separated through beating and whisking the dried leaves. The powder is concentrated in a mortar, to be mixed with water and melted to produce liquid wax. After drying it is concentrated into chunks and sold.

=== Leaf fibers ===
The leaf fibers are a byproduct of the wax production, known as "bagana". The biomass can be used as compost, soil coverage to maintain humidity, or compressed into biofuel briquettes with a high energy content for power generation. The leaf fibers, or "palha", are also woven in the manufacture of objects such as hats, baskets, bags and many other domestic products (Steinle and Johnson, 1935; Duke and duCellier). These handicraft products are beloved by tourists and represent an important source of income to the local population. The wax palm leaves can also be used in rustic roof making.

=== Wood ===
Due to the natural resistance against the most common wood pests, such as termites, Carnauba Wood is a valued local construction material. Although it is mainly used by people with low income, its function in beach tents – not only as central pillar/column/post, but also as the leaf roof – is very common.

The Mercado de Carne de Aquiraz, in Ceará, is one notable example of Carnauba Wood effectiveness as a versatile construction material. While the roof of the building is supported by trusses and beams consisting of the whole Carnauba trunk, the ceramic roof tiles are carefully fitted atop rafters made from the same wood, cut in four equal sections.

== Cultivation ==
It withstands drought well. A slightly saline composition in the soil produces the best trees.

== Harvest ==
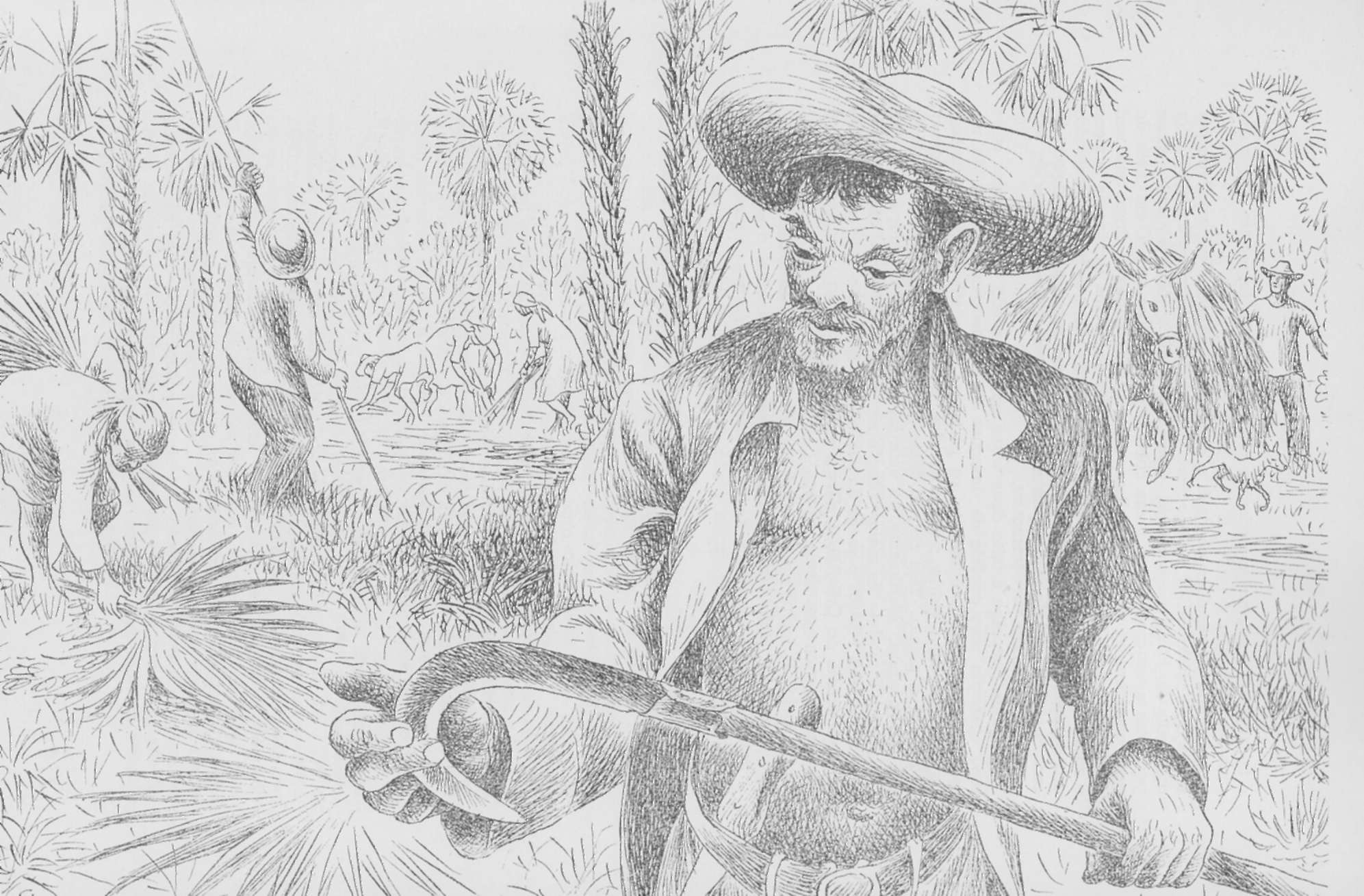
Figure 1: Carnaúba harvest tool.

To produce wax, harvesting operations have to be employed during the dry season to assure complete drying of the leaves. The harvest is normally done from August to December. However, during periods of longer winters, the harvest may be delayed. A Carnuaba palm tree can produce up to 60 leaves per plant, especially after a very intense rainy season. Harvested with a long pole ending in a hooked blade (Figure 1), the top leaves are removed for superior wax content. To maintain sustainable production of Carnauba, cuttings are performed three times a year, in 80 day intervals from each tree. Production of Carnauba-derived materials dropped in the beginning of the 1970s, especially due to the invention of synthetic and petroleum products. Since then, the production has increased in the beginning of the 2000s and reached around 20,000 tons of powder and around 2,500 tons of wax, which has been sustained since then.

== Economy ==
Carnauba economical activity includes the extraction and utilization of leaves, stem, tale and fibre, fruits and roots. These materials are all manufactured into crafted and industrialized products. However, the powder used in wax production is the most profitable part of the plant due to great market interest. The production of Carnauba is mainly found in Northeastern Brazil, especially in the Rio Grande do Norte state (5%), Ceará state (35%) and in Piauí state (45%). Brazil is the only exporting country, and the main importers are Japan, United States and also Europe.

== Gallery ==
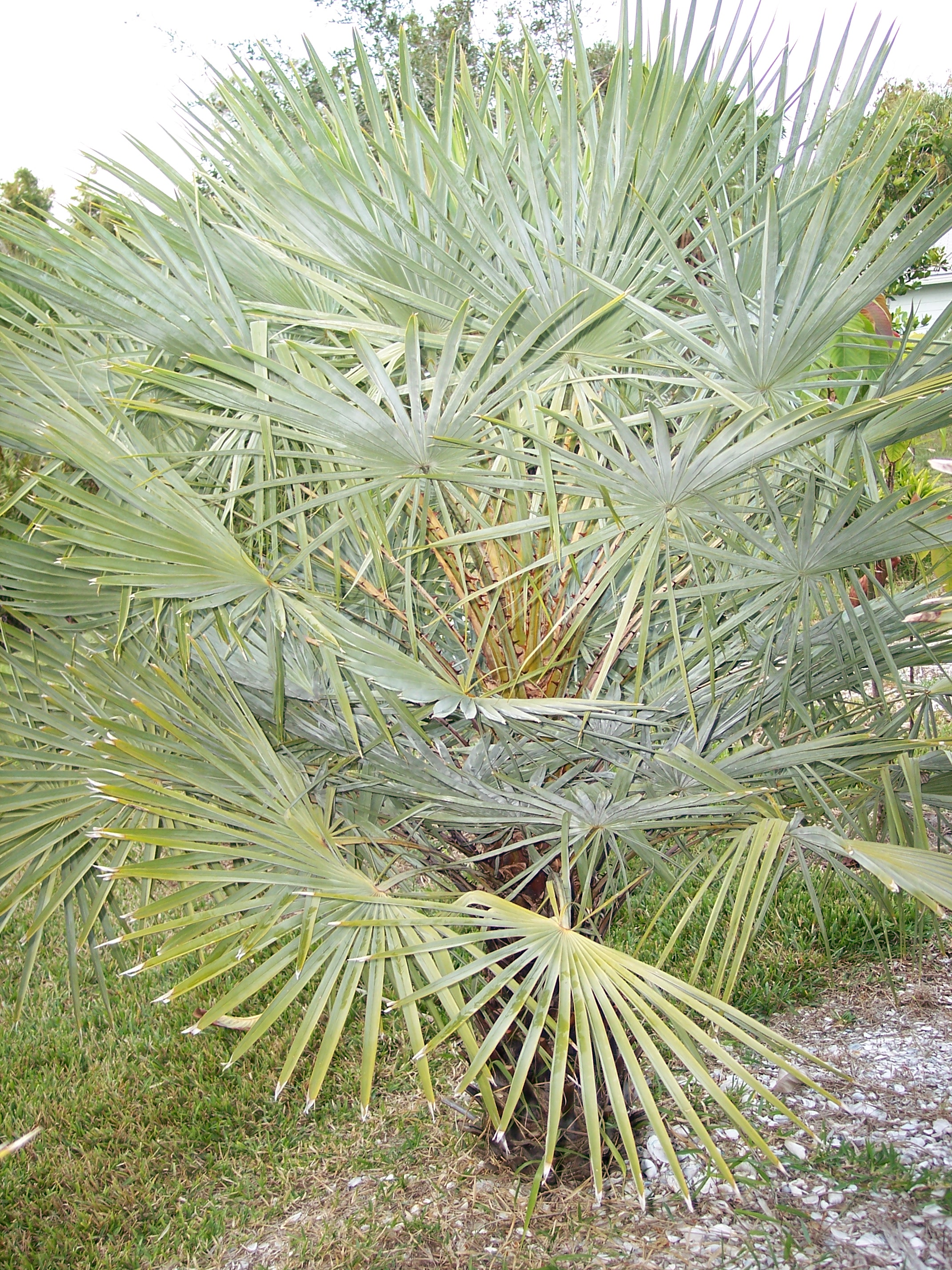
Leaf crown

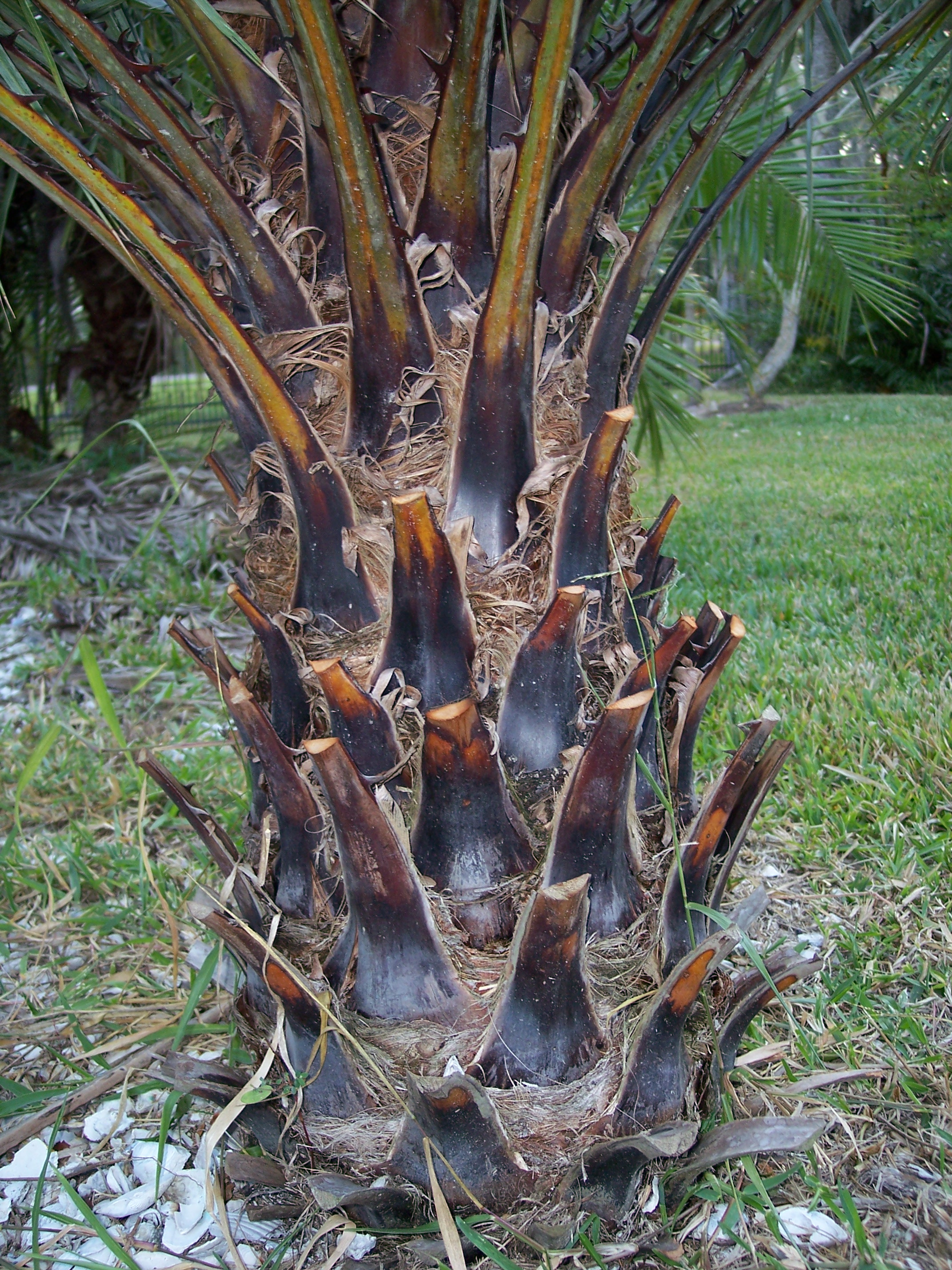
Trunk covered in adherent leaf sheaths and fibers which shed with age

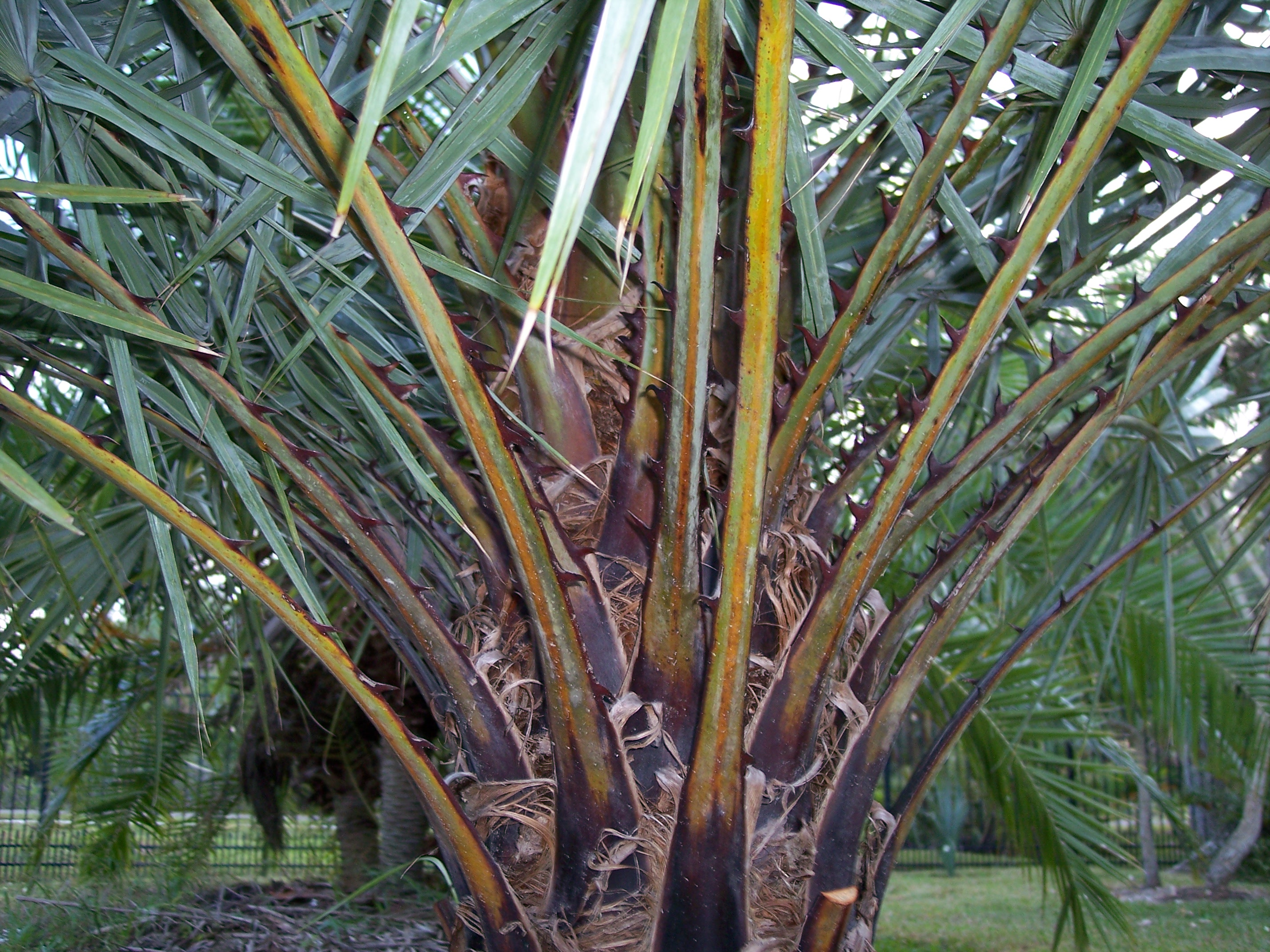
Armed petioles - note orange banding along center

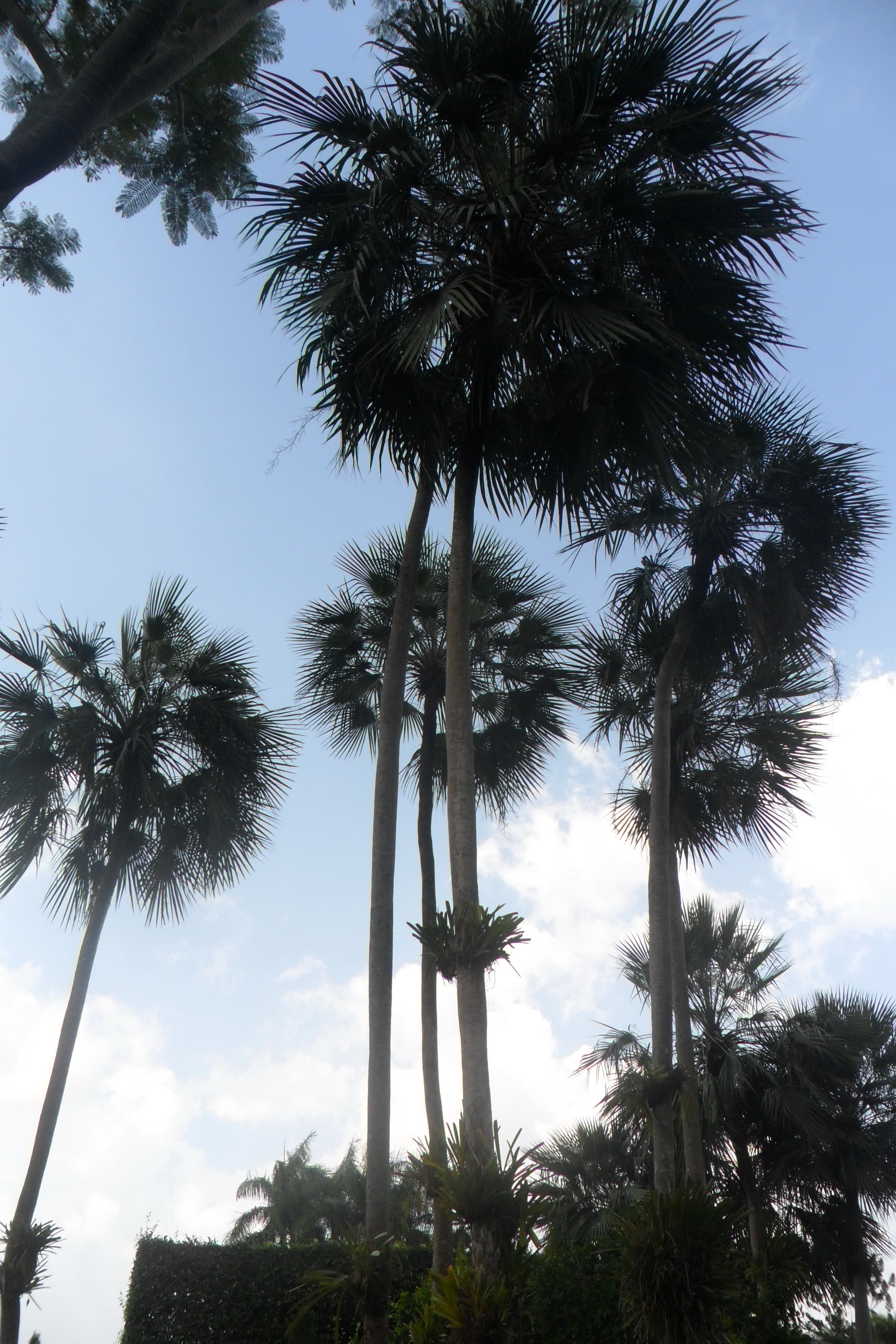
