= Armorial of Brazil =

This gallery of coats of arms of Brazilian regions shows the coats of arms and emblems of the 26 Brazilian States and the Federal District.

== Armorial of Brazilian regions ==
Coat of arms of Acre

Coat of arms of Alagoas

Coat of arms of Amapá

Coat of arms of Amazonas

Coat of arms of Bahia

Coat of arms of Ceará

Coat of arms of Espírito Santo

Coat of arms of Goiás

Coat of arms of Maranhão

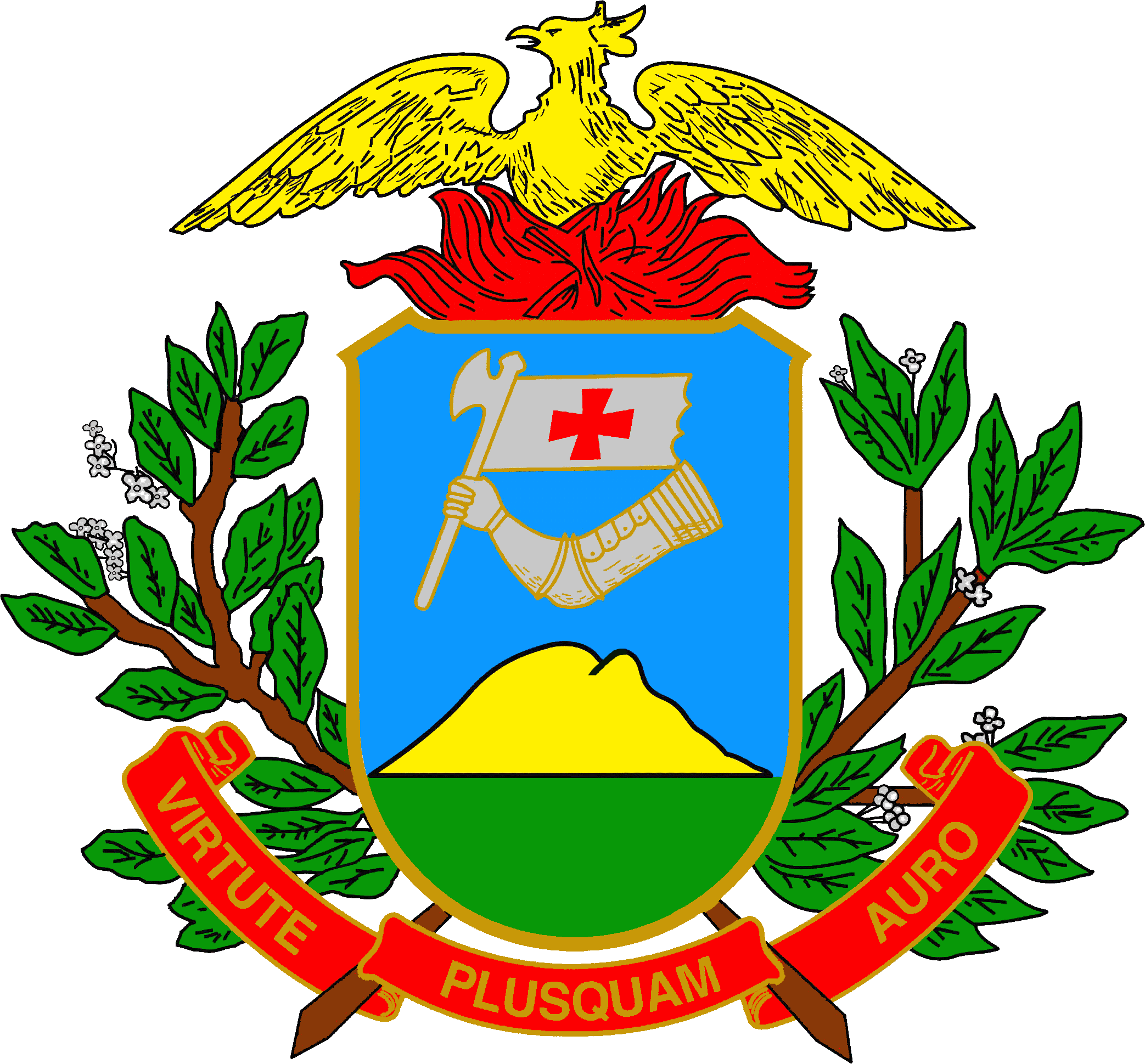
Coat of arms of Mato Grosso

Coat of arms of Mato Grosso do Sul

Coat of arms of Minas Gerais

Coat of arms of Pará

Coat of arms of Paraíba

Coat of arms of Paraná

Coat of arms of Pernambuco

Coat of arms of Piauí

Coat of arms of Rio de Janeiro

Coat of arms of Rio Grande do Norte

Coat of arms of Rio Grande do Sul

Coat of arms of Rondônia

Coat of arms of Roraima

Coat of arms of Santa Catarina

Coat of arms of São Paulo

Coat of arms of Sergipe

Coat of arms of Tocantins

Coat of arms of Federal District

== Armorial of Brazilian capitals ==
This gallery of coats of arms of Brazilian states shows the coats of the 26 Brazilian State capitals and the Federal District.

=== States ===
Name	Arms
Aracaju, SE; Coat of Arms of Aracaju	
Belém, PA; Coat of Arms of Belém	
Belo Horizonte, MG; Coat of Arms of Belo Horizonte	
Boa Vista, RR; Coat of Arms of Boa Vista (Roraima)	
Campo Grande, MS; Coat of Arms of Campo Grande (Mato Grosso do Sul)	
Cuiabá, MT; Coat of Arms of Cuiabá	
Curitiba, PR; Coat of Arms of Curitiba	
Florianópolis, SC; Coat of Arms of Florianópolis	
Fortaleza, CE; Coat of Arms of Fortaleza	
Goiânia, GO; Coat of Arms of Goiânia	
João Pessoa, PB; Coat of Arms of João Pessoa	
Macapá, AP; Coat of Arms of Macapá	
Maceió, AL; Coat of Arms of Maceió	
Manaus, AM; Coat of Arms of Manaus	
Natal, RN; Coat of Arms of Natal	
Palmas, TO; Coat of Arms of Palmas	
Porto Alegre, RS; Coat of Arms of Porto Alegre	
Porto Velho, RO; Coat of Arms of Porto Velho	
Recife, PE; Coat of Arms of Recife	
Rio Branco, AC; Coat of Arms of Rio Branco (Acre)	
Rio de Janeiro, RJ; Coat of Arms of Rio de Janeiro	
Salvador, BA; Coat of Arms of Salvador	
São Luís, MA; Coat of Arms of São Luís (Maranhão)	
São Paulo, SP; Coat of Arms of São Paulo	
Teresina, PI; Coat of Arms of Teresina	
Vitória, ES; Coat of Arms of Vitória	

=== District ===
Name	Arms
Brasília, DF	

== See also ==
- Coat of arms of Brazil
- List of Brazilian flags
