= Ohio =

U.S. state

- State
- Flag Seal
- Nicknames: The Buckeye State; Birthplace of Aviation; The Heart of It All
- Motto: "With God, all things are possible"
- Anthem: "Beautiful Ohio"
- Location of Ohio within the United States
- Country: United States
- Before statehood: Northwest Territory
- Admitted to the Union: March 1, 1803; 223 years ago (17th, declared retroactively on August 7, 1953; 73 years ago)
- Capital (and largest city): Columbus
- Largest metro and urban areas: Greater Cleveland (combined and urban); Cincinnati (metro); Columbus (metro) (see footnotes) (Note: According to the U.S. Census, Greater Columbus is the largest Metropolitan statistical area (MSA) that is entirely within Ohio, with a population of 2,078,725; and Greater Cincinnati is the largest MSA that is at least partially within Ohio, with a population of 2,179,082, approximately 25% of which is in Indiana or Kentucky. Which MSA is the largest in Ohio depends on the context.)

Government
  - Governor: Mike DeWine (R)
  - Lieutenant Governor: Jim Tressel (R)
- Legislature: General Assembly
  - Upper house: Senate
  - Lower house: House of Representatives
- Judiciary: Supreme Court of Ohio
- U.S. senators: Bernie Moreno (R); Jon Husted (R)
- U.S. House delegation: 10 Republicans; 5 Democrats (list)

Area
  - Total: 44,825 sq mi (116,096 km^{2})
  - Land: 40,987 sq mi (106,156 km^{2})
  - Water: 3,880 sq mi (10,040 km^{2}) 8.7%
  - Rank: 34th

Dimensions
  - Length: 221 mi (355 km)
  - Width: 221 mi (355 km)
- Elevation: 850 ft (260 m)
- Highest elevation (Campbell Hill (Note: Elevation adjusted to North American Vertical Datum of 1988)): 1,549 ft (472 m)
- Lowest elevation (Ohio River at Indiana border): 456 ft (139 m)

Population (2025)
  - Total: ▲11,900,510
  - Rank: 7th
  - Density: 280/sq mi (109/km^{2})
  - Rank: 10th
  - Median household income: $67,800 (2023)
  - Income rank: 36th
- Demonym(s): Ohioan; Buckeye (colloq.)

Language
  - Official language: De jure: None; De facto: English
  - Spoken language: English 93.3% Spanish 2.2% Other 4.5%
- Time zone: UTC−05:00 (Eastern)
  - Summer (DST): UTC−04:00 (EDT)
- USPS abbreviation: OH
- ISO 3166 code: US-OH
- Traditional abbreviation: O., Oh.
- Latitude: 38°24′ N to 41°59′ N
- Longitude: 80°31′ W to 84°49′ W
- Website: ohio.gov

State symbols of Ohio
List of state symbols
- Flag of Ohio

- Seal of Ohio

- Coat of arms of Ohio
- Slogan: The Heart Of It All

Living insignia
- Amphibian: Spotted salamander
- Bird: Cardinal (1933)
- Flower: Red carnation (1904); Great white trillium (1986) (wildflower)
- Fruit: Pawpaw
- Insect: Ladybug (1975)
- Mammal: White-tailed deer (1987)
- Reptile: Black racer snake (1995)
- Tree: Buckeye (1953)

Inanimate insignia
- Beverage: Tomato juice (1965)
- Fossil: Isotelus maximus, a trilobite (1985)
- Gemstone: Ohio flint (1965)

State route marker

State quarter
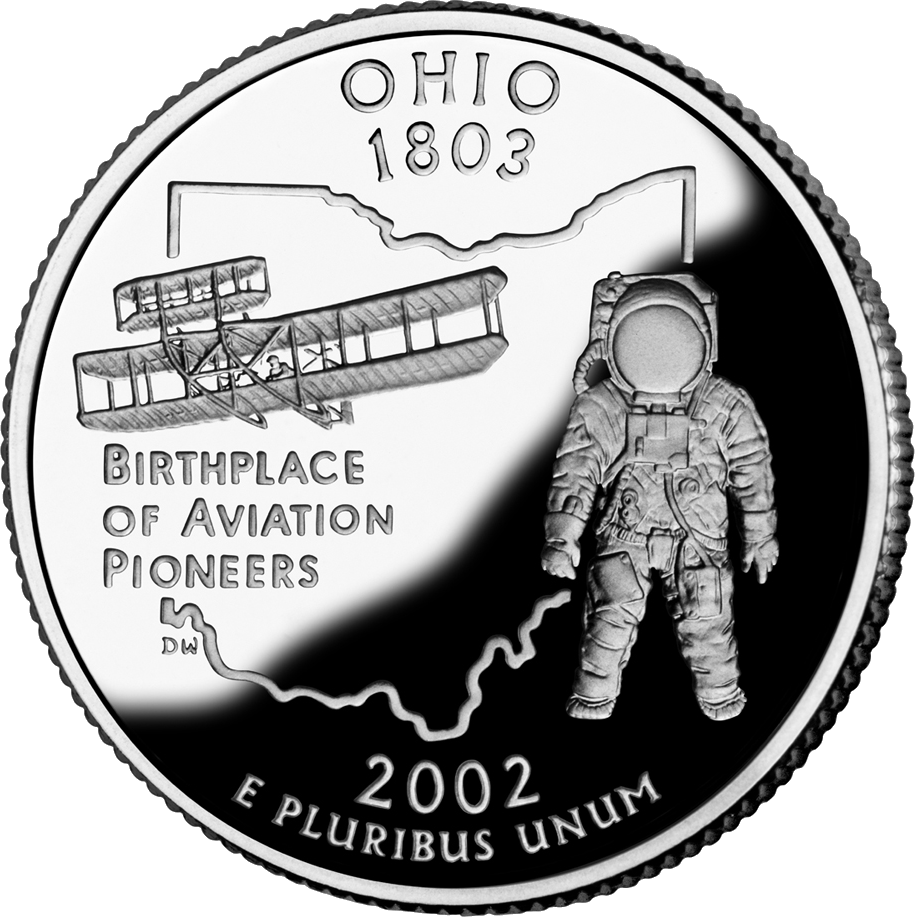
- Released in 2002

Ohio (/oʊˈhaɪ.oʊ/ oh-HY-oh) is a state in the Midwestern region of the United States. It borders the Canadian province of Ontario to the north (through Lake Erie), Pennsylvania to the east, West Virginia to the southeast, Kentucky to the southwest, Indiana to the west, and Michigan to the northwest. Ohio is the 34th-largest state by area, at 44,825 sq mi (116,100 km^{2}), and the seventh-most populous state, with a population of nearly 11.9 million. Its capital and most populous city is Columbus. Other urban areas include the major metropolitan cities of Cleveland and Cincinnati, alongside Dayton, Akron, and Toledo.

Ohio derives its name from the Ohio River that forms its southern border, which, in turn, originated from the Seneca word ohiːyo', meaning "good river", "great river", or "large creek". Its geography is varied, with rolling glaciated plains across most of the state, rugged unglaciated hills in the southeastern Allegheny Plateau, and Lake Erie coastline to the north. At the time of European contact, the area known as the Ohio Country was inhabited by Algonquian and Iroquoian nations, and was contested among Native American tribes, Britain, and France. Following American independence, Ohio was organized as part of the Northwest Territory and achieved statehood in 1803. Ohio was the first state admitted under the Northwest Ordinance and the first post-colonial free state admitted to the union.

Historically known as the heart of American industry, Ohio has the third-largest manufacturing sector and second-largest automobile production in the U.S.; it also has a large agriculture sector. The state has shifted to a more information and service-based economy in the 21st century, ranking seventh in GDP as of 2025. Tourism in Ohio is driven by attractions such as Cedar Point, the National Museum of the United States Air Force and the Rock and Roll Hall of Fame, as well as recreation areas including Cuyahoga Valley National Park and 76 state parks. Ohio is nicknamed the "Buckeye State" after its Ohio buckeye trees. It is also known as the "Mother of Presidents", having been the birthplace of seven U.S. presidents, and the "Birthplace of Aviation", as the Wright brothers designed and built the world's first successful airplane in Ohio before its first flight in North Carolina.

== History ==
=== Indigenous settlement ===
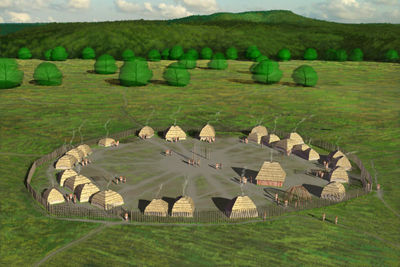
Artist's conception of the Fort Ancient culture SunWatch Indian Village in present-day Dayton, Ohio

Archeological evidence of spear points of both the Folsom and Clovis types indicate that the Ohio Valley was inhabited by nomadic people as early as 13,000 BC. These early nomads disappeared from Ohio by 1,000 BC. Between 1,000 and 800 BC, the sedentary Adena culture emerged. The Adena established "semi-permanent" villages because they domesticated plants, including sunflowers, and "grew squash and possibly corn"; with hunting and gathering, this cultivation supported more settled, complex villages. The most notable remnant of the Adena culture is the Great Serpent Mound, located in Adams County, Ohio.

Around 100 BC, the Adena evolved into the Hopewell tradition, who were also mound builders. Their complex, large and technologically sophisticated earthworks can be found in modern-day Marietta, Newark, and Circleville. They were also a prolific trading society, their trading network spanning a third of the continent. The Hopewell disappeared from the Ohio Valley about 600 AD. The Mississippian culture rose as the Hopewell culture declined. Many Siouan-speaking peoples from the plains and east coast claim them as ancestors and say they lived throughout the Ohio region until approximately the 13th century.

There were three other cultures contemporaneous with the Mississippians: the Fort Ancient people, the Whittlesey culture and the Monongahela Culture. All three disappeared in the 17th century. Their origins are unknown. The Shawnees may have absorbed the Fort Ancient people. It is also possible that the Monongahela held no land in Ohio during the Colonial Era. The Mississippian culture was close to and traded extensively with the Fort Ancient people.

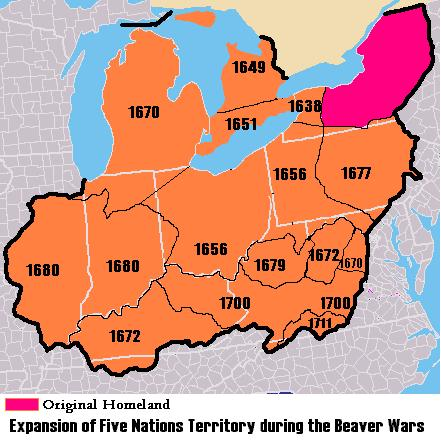
Haudenosaunee conquests during the Beaver Wars (mid-1600s), which largely depopulated the upper and mid-Ohio River valley

Indians in the Ohio Valley were significantly affected by the aggressive tactics of the Haudenosaunee Confederacy, based in central and western New York. After the Beaver Wars in the mid-17th century, the Haudenosaunee claimed much of the Ohio country as hunting and, more importantly, beaver-trapping ground. The land gradually became repopulated by Algonquian people following a series of epidemics and war in the mid-17th century. Many of these nations were multi-ethnic (sometimes multi-linguistic) societies born out of the earlier devastation brought about by disease, war, and subsequent social instability. They subsisted on agriculture supplemented by seasonal hunts. By the 18th century, they were part of a larger global economy brought about by European entry into the fur trade.

Some of the Indigenous nations that historically inhabited Ohio include the Iroquoian, (Note: Petun, Erie, Chonnonton, Wyandot, the Mingo Seneca and the Haudenosaunee Confederacy) the Algonquian, (Note: Miami, Mascouten Lenape Shawnee and Odawa) and the Siouan. (Note: Mosopelea) The region was also the site of Indian massacres, such as the Yellow Creek massacre and the Gnadenhutten massacre. After the War of 1812, when Natives suffered serious losses such as the Battle of Tippecanoe, most Native tribes either left Ohio or had to live on only limited reservations. By 1842, all remaining Natives were forced out of the state.

=== Colonial and Revolutionary eras ===
During the 18th century, the French set up a system of trading posts to control the fur trade in the region, which was known as the Ohio Country. Beginning in 1754, France and Britain fought the French and Indian War, with various Native American tribes on each side. As a result of the Treaty of Paris, the French ceded control of Ohio and the remainder of the Old Northwest to Britain in 1763.

During the 1760s and 70s, Britain thinly exercised sovereignty over the Ohio Country by stationing small garrisons in the region. (Note: The last French fort in the Ohio Country, Fort Sandusky, was destroyed in 1763 during Pontiac's War.) Just beyond Ohio Country was the Miami people capital of Kekionga, which became the center of British trade and influence in Ohio Country and throughout the future Northwest Territory. By the Royal Proclamation of 1763, lands west of Appalachia were closed to settlement by Anglo-American colonists. The Treaty of Fort Stanwix in 1768 explicitly reserved lands north and west of the Ohio as Native lands. A new set of British policies towards the region's tribes led to the outbreak of Pontiac's War in 1763.

Ohio tribes participated in the war until an armed expedition in Ohio led by Brigadier General Henry Bouquet brought about a truce. Another colonial military expedition into the Ohio Country in 1774 brought Lord Dunmore's War, kicked off by the Yellow Creek massacre in Ohio, to a conclusion. In 1774, Britain passed the Quebec Act, which formally annexed Ohio and other western lands to the Province of Quebec in order to provide a civil government and to centralize British administration of the Montreal-based fur trade. The prohibition of settlement west of the Appalachians remained, contributing to the American Revolution.

By the start of the American Revolutionary War, the movement of Natives and Americans between the Ohio Country and Thirteen Colonies had resulted in tension. Fort Pitt in Pennsylvania had become the main fort where expeditions into Ohio started. Intrusions into the area included General Edward Hand's 1778 movement of 500 Pennsylvania militiamen from Fort Pitt towards Mingo towns on the Cuyahoga River, where the British stored military supplies which they distributed to Indian raiding parties; Colonel Daniel Brodhead's invasion in 1780 and destruction of the Lenape capital of Coshocton; a detachment of one hundred of George Rogers Clark's troops that were ambushed near the Ohio River by Indians led by Joseph Brant in the same year; a British and Native American attack on the U.S.' Fort Laurens; and the 1782 detainment and murder of 96 Moravian Lenape pacifists by Pennsylvania militiamen in the Gnadenhutten massacre.

The western theatre never had a decisive victor. In the Treaty of Paris in 1783, Britain ceded all claims to Ohio Country to the new United States after its victory in the American Revolutionary War.

=== Northwest Territory ===
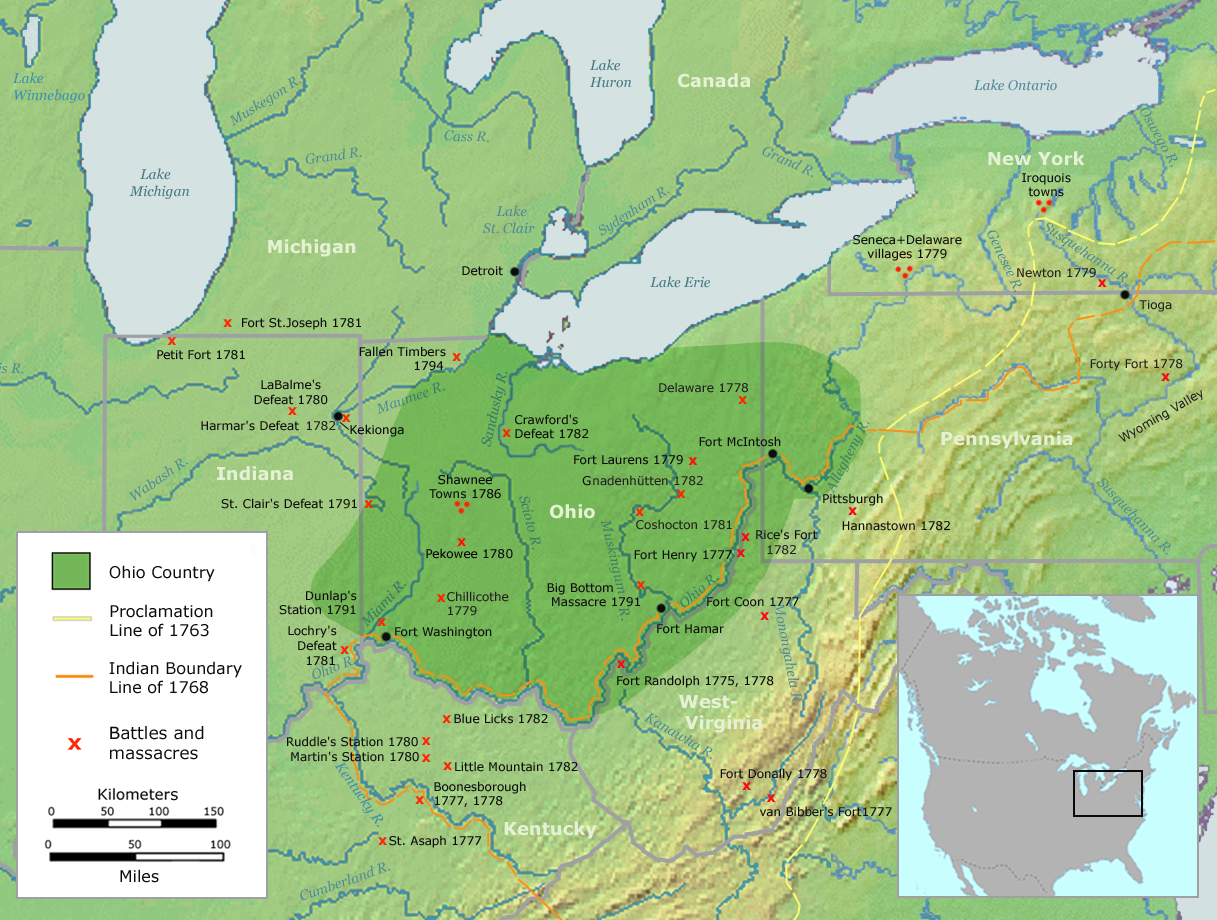
The Ohio Country indicating battle sites between American settlers and Indigenous tribes, 1775–1794

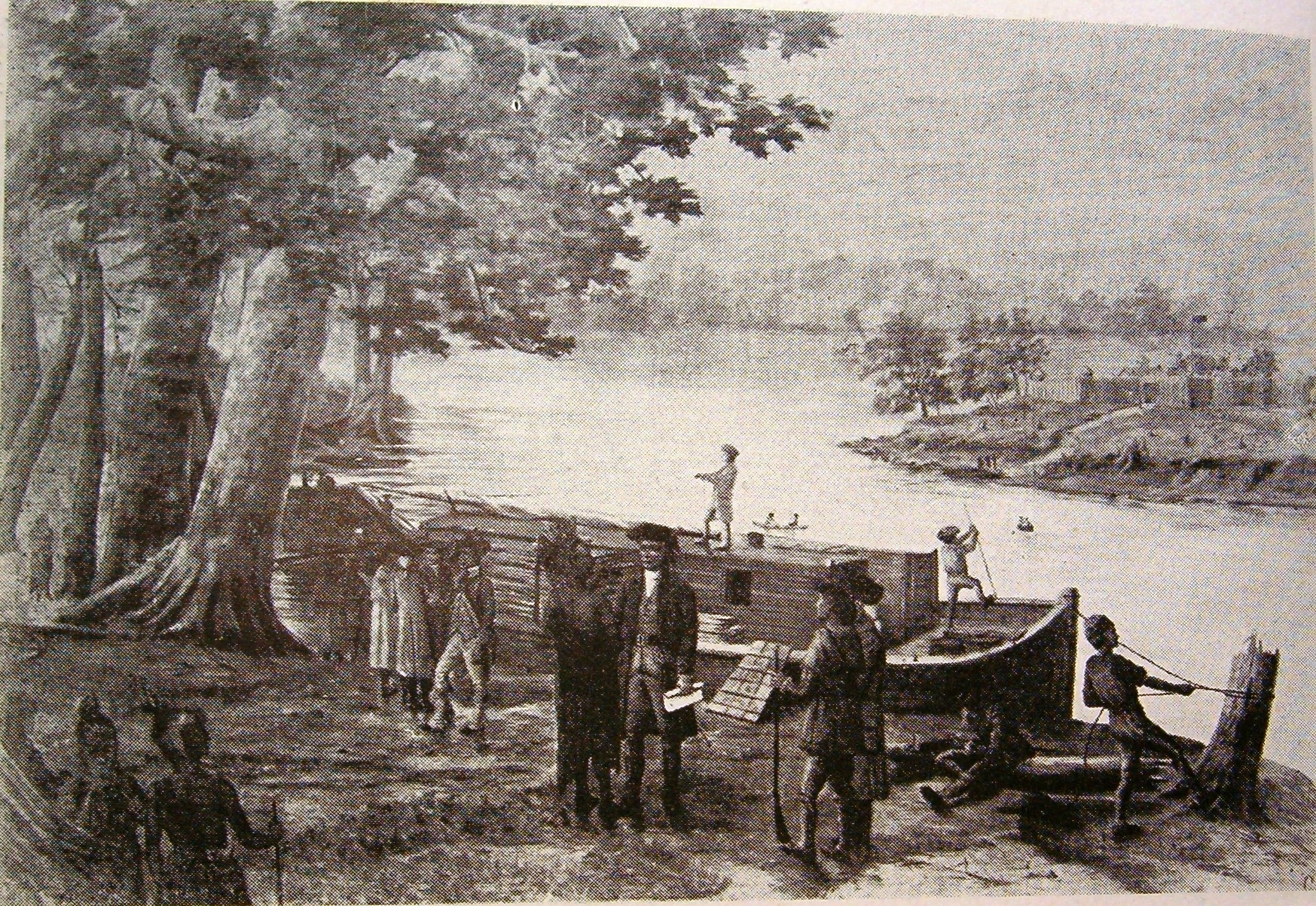
The landing of Rufus Putnam and the first settlers at Marietta, Ohio, 1788

The United States created the Northwest Territory under the Northwest Ordinance of 1787. Slavery was not permitted in the new territory. Settlement began with the founding of Marietta, Ohio, by the Ohio Company of Associates, which had been formed by a group of American Revolutionary War veterans. Following the Ohio Company, the Miami Company (also referred to as the "Symmes Purchase") claimed the southwestern section, and the Connecticut Land Company surveyed and settled the Connecticut Western Reserve in present-day Northeast Ohio. Territorial surveyors from Fort Steuben began surveying an area of eastern Ohio called the Seven Ranges at about the same time.

The old Northwest Territory originally included areas previously known as Ohio Country and Illinois Country. As Ohio prepared for statehood, the Indiana Territory was created, reducing the Northwest Territory to approximately the size of present-day Ohio plus the eastern half of the Lower Peninsula of Michigan and the eastern tip of the Upper Peninsula and a sliver of southeastern Indiana called "The Gore". The coalition of Native American tribes, known as the Western Confederacy, was forced to cede extensive territory, including much of present-day Ohio, in the Treaty of Greenville in 1795.

Under the Northwest Ordinance, areas could be defined and admitted as states once their population reached 60,000. Although Ohio's population was only 45,000 in December 1801, the United States Congress determined that it was growing rapidly enough and accelerated the process via the Enabling Act of 1802. In regard to the Leni Lenape natives, Congress decided that 10,000 acres on the Muskingum River in the present state of Ohio would "be set apart and the property thereof be vested in the Moravian Brethren ... or a society of the said Brethren for civilizing the Indians and promoting Christianity".

Rufus Putnam has been referred to as the "father of Ohio". He and Manasseh Cutler were instrumental in creating the Northwest Ordinance, which opened up the Northwest Territory for settlement. The land was used to serve as compensation for what was owed to Revolutionary War veterans. Putnam organized and led the Ohio Company of Associates, who settled at Marietta, Ohio, where they built Campus Martius. Putnam set substantial amounts of land aside for schools, and in 1798, he created the plan for the construction of Muskingum Academy, now Marietta College. After being appointed superintendent of the Ohio Company relating to the settlement north of the Ohio River, he was later commissioned as Surveyor-General of United States Lands and served as a judge in the Northwest Territory's first court. In 1802, he served in the Ohio Constitutional Convention.

=== Statehood and early years ===
On February 19, 1803, President Thomas Jefferson signed an act of Congress approving Ohio's boundaries and constitution. Congress, however, did not formally admit Ohio as the 17th state. After the oversight was discovered in 1953 during preparations for Ohio's sesquicentennial, Congressman George H. Bender introduced legislation retroactively admitting Ohio effective March 1, 1803, the date the Ohio General Assembly first convened. At a special session in Chillicothe, Ohio, the state legislature approved a new petition for statehood, which was delivered to Washington, D.C., on horseback and approved that August.

Ohio has had three capital cities: Chillicothe, Zanesville, and Columbus. Chillicothe served as the capital from 1803 to 1810, before the seat of government moved to Zanesville for two years as part of a legislative compromise. The capital returned to Chillicothe in 1812 and was permanently relocated to Columbus in 1816 because of its central location within the state.

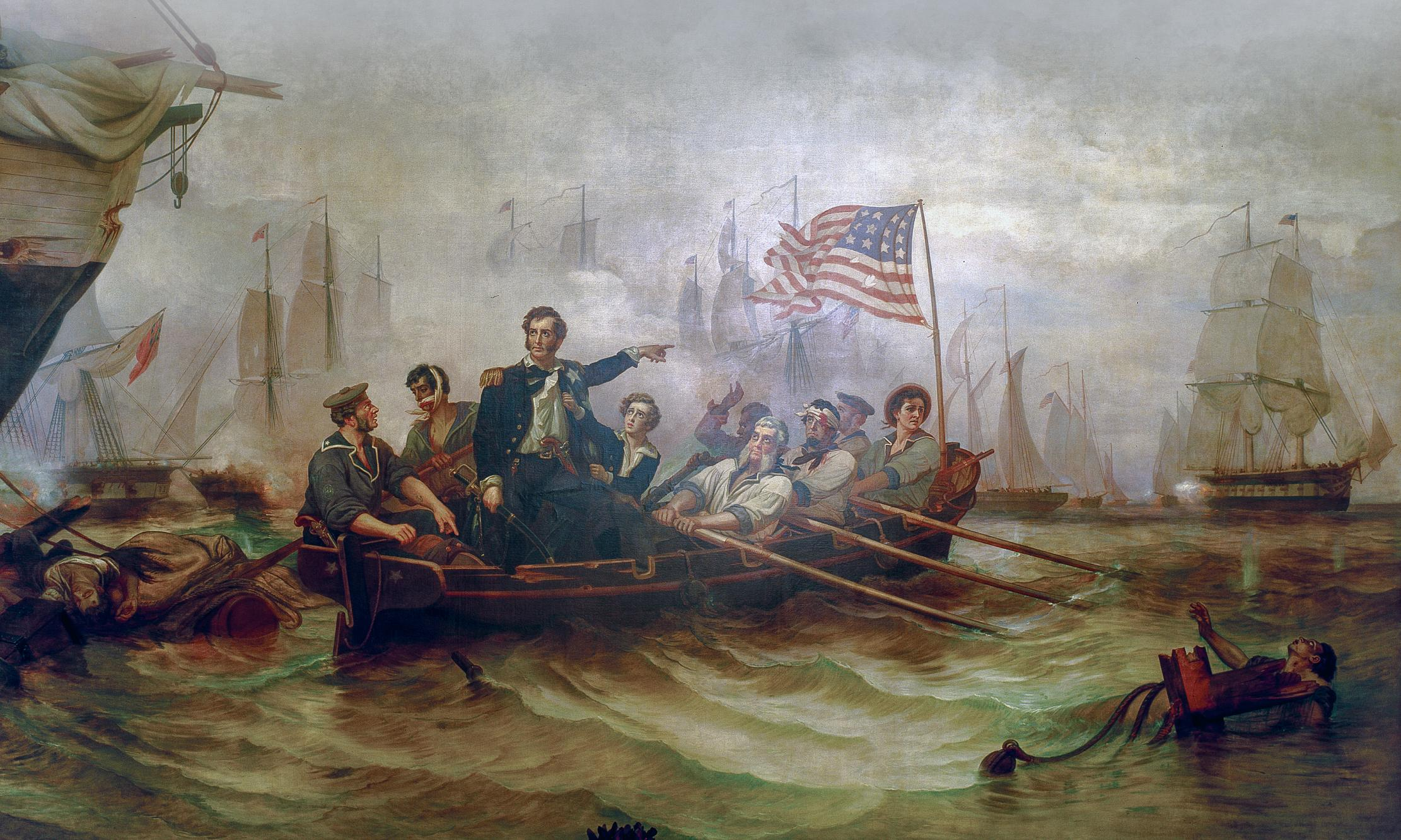
Battle of Lake Erie by William Henry Powell

Although many Native Americans migrated west to evade encroachment, others remained in Ohio and partially assimilated. Around 1809, the Shawnee renewed resistance to further American expansion, leading to Tecumseh's War between the United States and Tecumseh's confederacy. During the War of 1812, the British invaded Ohio from Upper Canada and allied with the Shawnee. Tecumseh was killed at the Battle of the Thames in 1813, and most of the Shawnee, excluding the Pekowi in southwest Ohio, were forcibly removed westward.

Ohio was on the front line of the western theater during the War of 1812. One of the largest naval engagements of the war was the Battle of Lake Erie that took place near South Bass Island, where Commodore Oliver Hazard Perry lead a U.S. Navy squadron to victory over a Royal Navy force under Robert Heriot Barclay. The victory and subsequent peace are commemorated by Perry's Victory and International Peace Memorial.

After the war, most remaining Native American groups in Ohio were forcibly removed westward under federal removal policies, particularly following the Indian Removal Act of 1830. In 1835, Ohio and the Michigan Territory fought the mostly bloodless Toledo War over control of the Toledo Strip, which included the mouth of the Maumee River and surrounding farmland. Only one person was injured in the conflict. Congress later made Michigan's statehood conditional on ending the dispute; in exchange for relinquishing its claim to the Toledo Strip, Michigan received the western two-thirds of the Upper Peninsula.

=== Civil War and industrialization ===
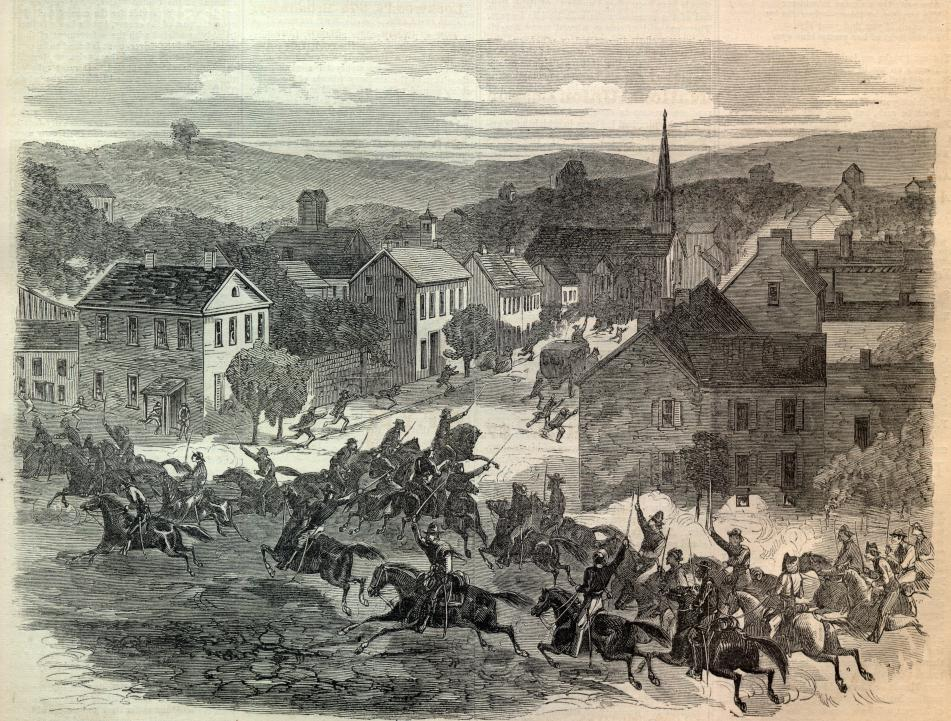
Morgan's Raid enters Old Washington, Ohio, during the American Civil War

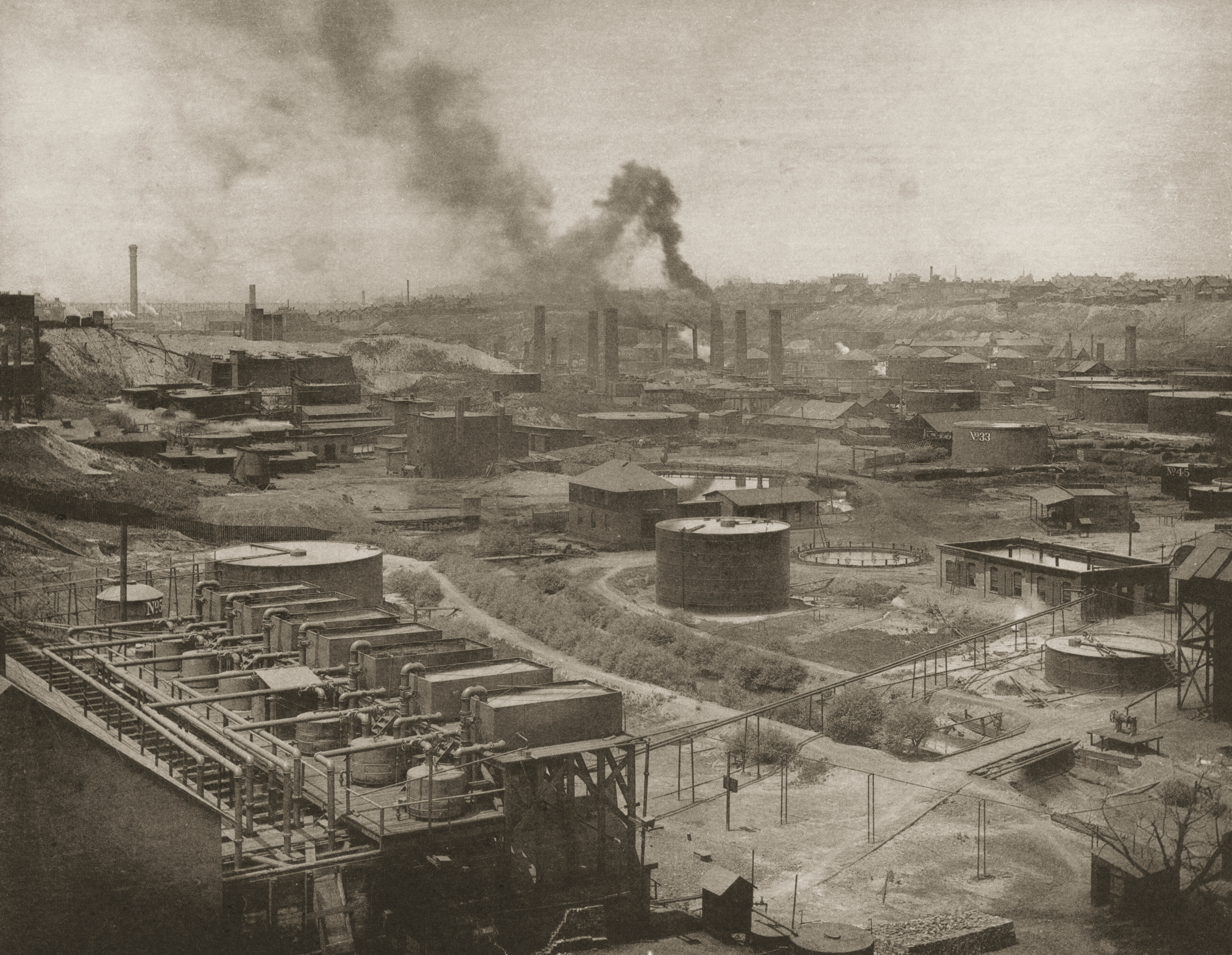
The first Standard Oil refinery was opened in Cleveland by businessman John D. Rockefeller.

During much of the 19th century, industry was rapidly introduced to complement an existing agricultural economy. One of the first iron blast furnaces opened near Youngstown, Ohio, in 1804. By the mid-19th century, 48 blast furnaces were operating in Ohio, mostly in the southern part of the state. The discovery of coal deposits in the state aided further development of Ohio's steel industry, and by 1853, Cleveland was the nation's third-largest iron and steel producer.

Ohio played a significant role in the Underground Railroad due to its location on the Kentucky border, the northernmost state of the Upland South, and its anti-slavery sentiments. Abolitionists serving the Underground Raildroad worked with enslaved people to organize escape routes to the North, and many of these routes intersected and passed through the state of Ohio.

Ohio's central location and large population gave it an important place in the American Civil War, as the Ohio River and the state's railroads were vital arteries for troop and supply movements. Ohio's industry made it one of the most important states in the Union during the war. It contributed more soldiers per capita than any other state in the Union. In 1862, the state's morale was badly shaken in the aftermath of the Battle of Shiloh, a costly victory in which Ohio forces suffered 2,000 casualties. Later that year, when the Confederate States Army under the leadership of Stonewall Jackson threatened Washington, D.C., Ohio governor David Tod recruited 5,000 volunteers to provide three months of service.

In July 1863, towns along the Ohio River were attacked and ransacked in Morgan's Raid, starting in Harrison, Ohio, in the west and culminating in the Battle of Salineville in the far east. Although the raid had little strategic impact on the Confederacy, it alarmed the populations of Ohio and Indiana by marking the deepest penetration of Confederate forces into Union territory during the war. Almost 35,000 Ohioans died in the conflict, and 30,000 were physically wounded. By the end of the Civil War, the Union's top three generals—Ulysses S. Grant, William Tecumseh Sherman, and Philip Sheridan—were all from Ohio.

Before the Civil War, the state's largest city was Cincinnati, but by the 1880s, the proximity of cities in Northeast Ohio to coal and iron ore resources led to the rapid urban growth of Cleveland, Akron, Canton and Youngstown. The first Bessemer converter was purchased by the Cleveland Rolling Mill Company, which became part of the U.S. Steel Corporation after the merger of Federal Steel Company and Carnegie Steel, the first billion-dollar American corporation. The first open-hearth furnace used for steel production was constructed by the Otis Steel Company in Cleveland, and by 1892, Ohio was the second-largest steel-producing state, behind Pennsylvania. Republic Steel was founded in Youngstown in 1899 and was at one point the nation's third-largest producer. Another important producer, Armco, was founded in Middletown, Ohio, in 1899.

=== 20th century ===
The flag of Ohio was adopted in 1902. After building the Wright Flyer at their workshop in Dayton, Ohio, brothers Orville and Wilbur Wright made four brief flights at Kitty Hawk, North Carolina, on December 17, 1903, inventing the first successful airplane. Ohio was hit by its greatest natural disaster in the Great Flood of 1913, resulting in at least 428 fatalities and hundreds of millions of dollars in property damage, particularly around the Great Miami River basin. The National Football League was founded in Canton, Ohio in 1920, later being honored as the home of the Pro Football Hall of Fame in 1963.

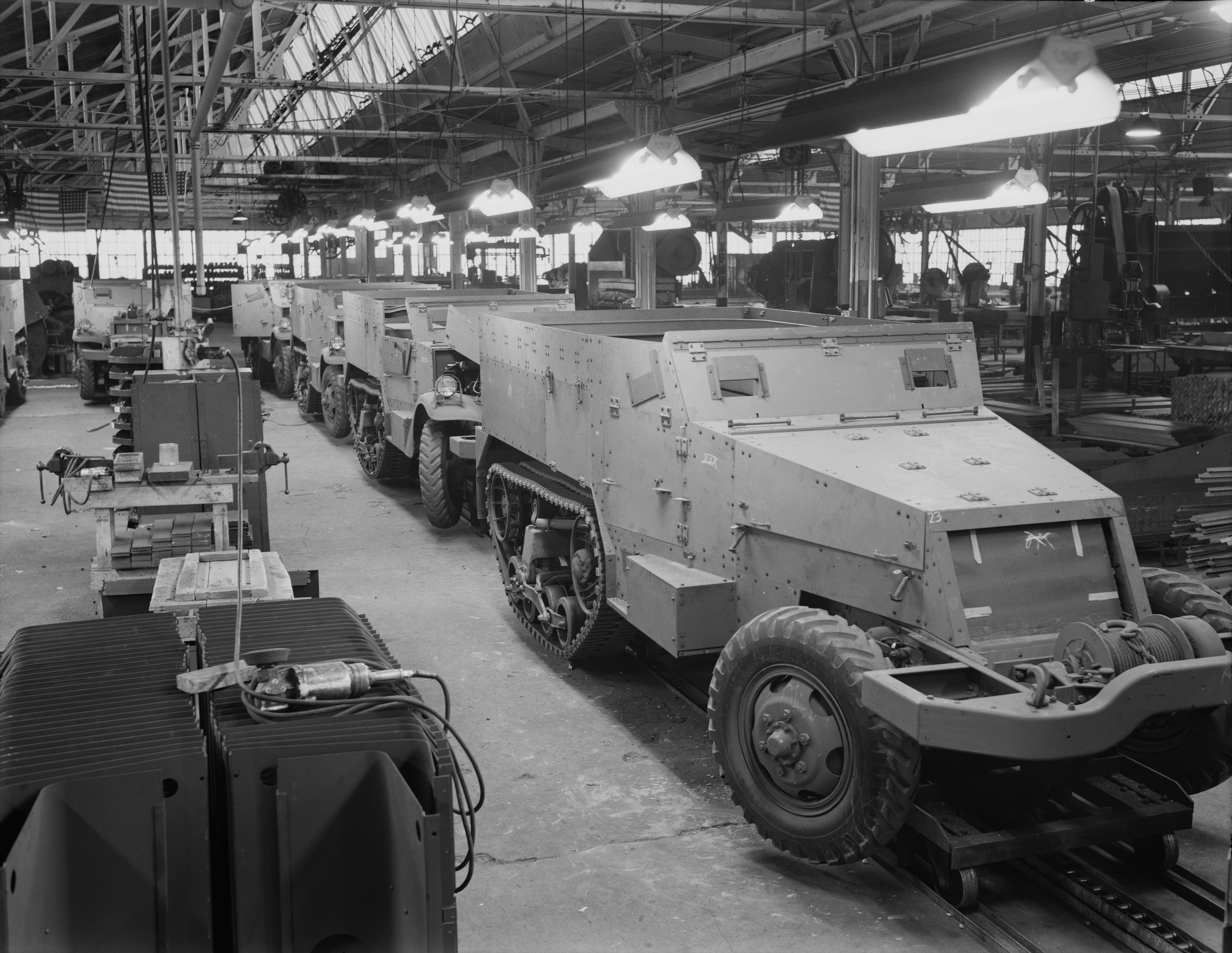
A factory in Canton, Ohio, formerly used to manufacture safes and locks, converted to produce half-tracks during World War II. Many Ohio factories shifted to the production of military equipment for the war effort.

In the 1930s, the Great Depression struck the state hard. By 1933, more than 40% of factory workers and 67% of construction workers were unemployed in Ohio. Approximately 50% of industrial workers in Cleveland and 80% in Toledo became unemployed, with the state unemployment rate reaching a high of 37.3%. During this era, Cleveland residents Jerry Siegel and Joe Shuster created Superman, partly inspired by the Jewish golem tradition and used to portray the defeat of Nazism. Ohio went on to contribute roughly 839,000 servicemembers to World War II. During the war, many Ohio manufacturers converted their facilities to produce military equipment and other war materials in support of the Allied powers. The Dayton Project was a branch of the larger Manhattan Project to develop polonium triggers used in early atomic bombs.

Ohio played a significant role in American popular culture during the 20th century, producing notable contributors to music, film, and visual art. Disc jockey Alan Freed hosted the first live rock and roll concert in Cleveland in 1952. Ohioans also made history in the Space Race, with John Glenn becoming the first American to orbit Earth in 1962, and Neil Armstrong becoming the first human to walk on the Moon in 1969. Carl Stokes was elected mayor of Cleveland in 1967 and became the first African American mayor of one of the nation's 10 most populous cities.

In 1970, Ohio Army National Guard troops killed four students during an antiwar protest at Kent State University, an event known as the Kent State shootings. The shootings and the subsequent rise in student strikes affected public opinion at an already socially contentious time over the role of the United States in the Vietnam War.

Ohio was an important state in developing China–United States relations in the late 1970s and early 1980s. Relations between the two countries normalized in 1979, during the second term of Ohio governor Jim Rhodes. Rhodes sought to encourage economic ties, viewing China as a potential market for Ohio machinery exports, and led a trade mission to China in July 1979. The trip resulted in developing economic ties, a sister state-province relationship with Hubei province, long-running Chinese exhibitions at the Ohio State Fair, and major academic exchanges between Ohio State University and Wuhan University. Beginning in the 1980s, the state entered into international economic and resource cooperation treaties and organizations with other governments in the Great Lakes region, including the Great Lakes Charter, Great Lakes Compact, and the Council of Great Lakes Governors. In 1995, the Dayton Agreement ending the Bosnian War was signed at Wright-Patterson Air Force Base.

=== 21st century ===
The trend of deindustrialization has continued to impact the state's economy and others within the Rust Belt region in the 21st century. Manufacturing in the Midwestern United States experienced a stark decline during the first quarter of the century, a trend that greatly impacted Ohio. From 1990 to 2019, it lost over 300,000 manufacturing jobs, but added over 1,000,000 non-manufacturing jobs. Coinciding with this decline, Ohio has seen a large decline in union membership: 17.4% of Ohioan workers were union members in 2000, while 12.8% were union members in 2022.

In the wake of these economic changes, the state government moved to promote new industries to offset manufacturing losses, such as the production of solar energy and electric vehicles. In 2002, Governor Bob Taft launched the "Third Frontier" program, which aimed to increase investment in Ohio and boost its technology sector. Much of northern Ohio was subject to the Northeast blackout of 2003, which was traced back to a FirstEnergy generating plant that went offline in Eastlake, Ohio. Ohio's economy was heavily afflicted by the Great Recession, as the state's unemployment rate rose from 5.6% in the first two months of 2008 up to a peak of 11.1% in December 2009 and January 2010. It took until August 2014 for the unemployment rate to return to 5.6%.

Politically, Ohio had been long regarded as a swing state, but the success of many Republican candidates in Ohio since the late 2000s has led many to question whether Ohio remains an electoral battleground. On March 9, 2020, the COVID-19 pandemic reached Ohio, which resulted in millions of cases. Ohio's economy was also impacted by the pandemic, as the state saw large job losses in 2020, as well as large amounts of subsequent stimulus spending. In 2023, the Hopewell Ceremonial Earthworks sites, which preserve monumental earthworks constructed by the Hopewell tradition between approximately 1 and 400 AD, were designated as a World Heritage Site by UNESCO.

== Geography ==
Geographic regions of Ohio

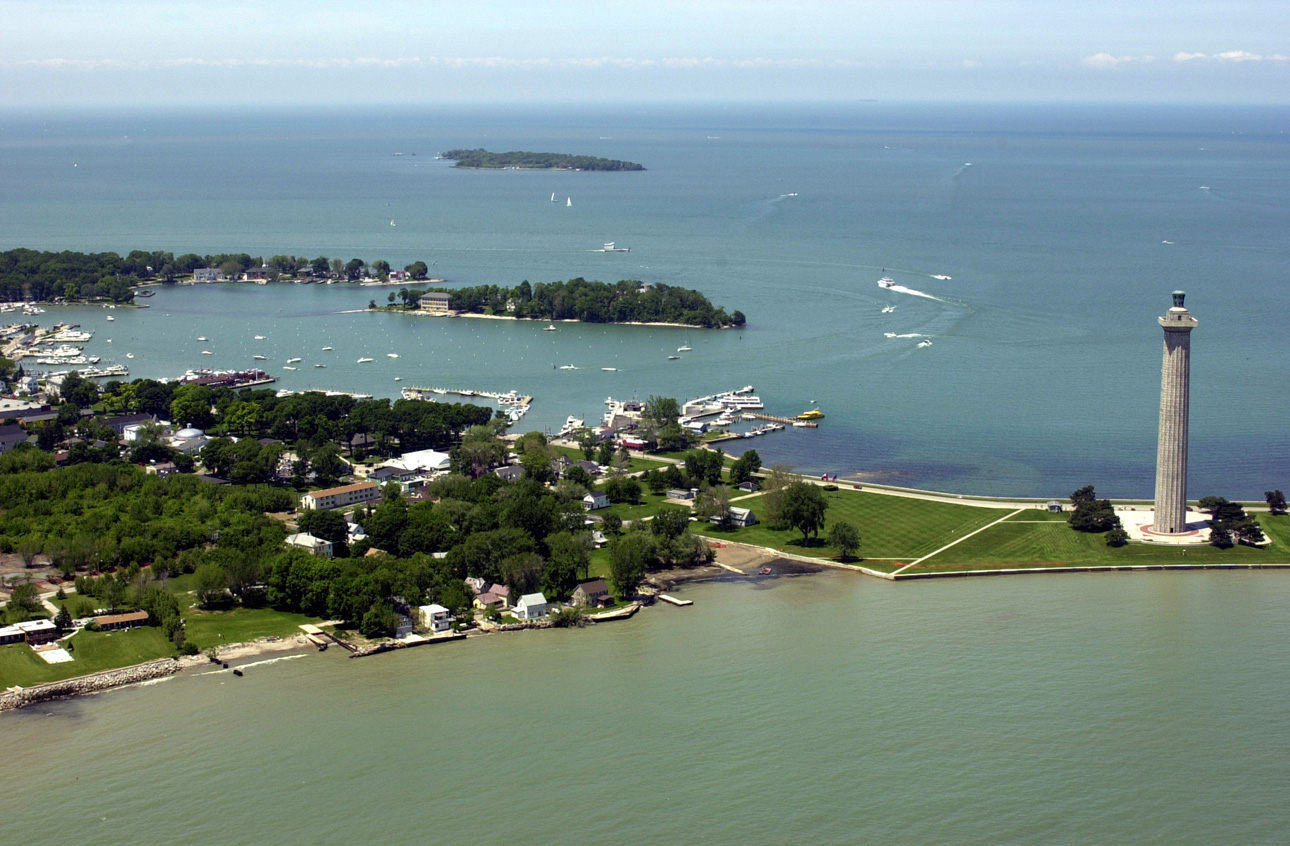
Put-in-Bay is located on South Bass Island, one of Ohio's Lake Erie Islands.

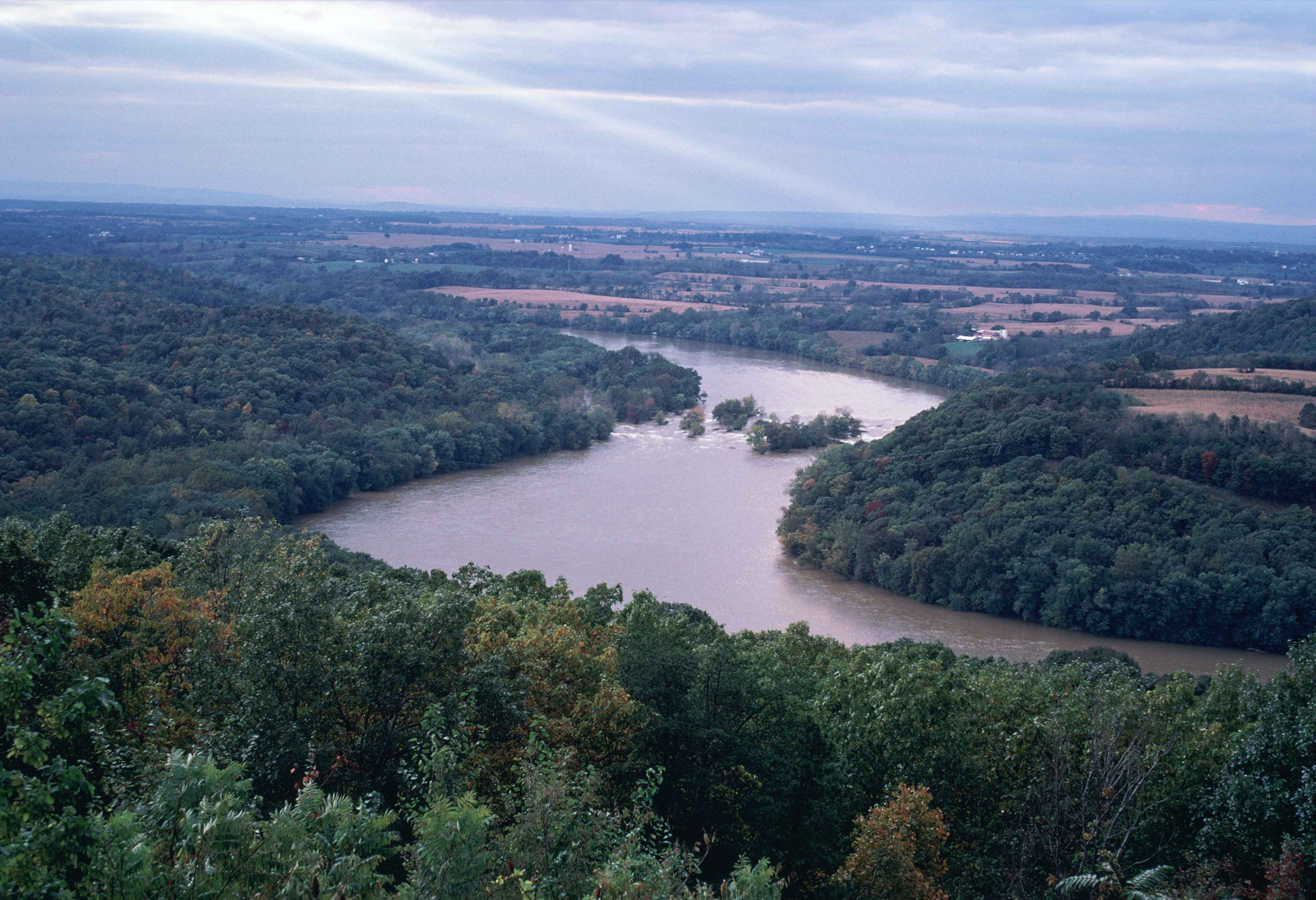
The Ohio River marks the state's southern and eastern borders with Kentucky and West Virginia.

Ohio's location has proven to be an asset for economic growth and expansion. Because it links the Northeast to the Midwest, much cargo and business traffic passes through its borders along its well-developed highways. Ohio has the nation's 10th-largest highway network and is within a one-day drive of 50% of North America's population and 70% of North America's manufacturing capacity. To the north, Ohio has 312 miles (502 km) of coastline with Lake Erie, which allows for numerous cargo ports such as Cleveland and Toledo. Ohio's southern border is defined by the Ohio River. Ohio's neighbors are Pennsylvania to the east, Michigan to the northwest, Lake Erie to the north, Indiana to the west, Kentucky on the south, and West Virginia on the southeast. Ohio's borders were defined by metes and bounds in the Enabling Act of 1802 as follows:

Bounded on the east by the Pennsylvania line, on the south by the Ohio River, to the mouth of the Great Miami River, on the west by the line drawn due north from the mouth of the Great Miami aforesaid, and on the north by an east and west line drawn through the southerly extreme of Lake Michigan, running east after intersecting the due north line aforesaid, from the mouth of the Great Miami until it shall intersect Lake Erie or the territorial line, and thence with the same through Lake Erie to the Pennsylvania line aforesaid.

Ohio is bounded by the Ohio River, but nearly all of the river belongs to Kentucky and West Virginia. In 1980, the U.S. Supreme Court held that, based on the wording of the cessation of territory by Virginia (which at the time included what is now Kentucky and West Virginia), the boundary between Ohio and Kentucky (and, by implication, West Virginia) is the northern low-water mark of the river as it existed in 1792. Ohio has only that portion of the river between the river's 1792 low-water mark and the present high-water mark. The border with Michigan has also changed, as a result of the Toledo War, to angle slightly northeast to the north shore of the mouth of the Maumee River.

Much of Ohio features glaciated till plains, with an exceptionally flat area in the northwest being known as the Great Black Swamp. This glaciated region in the northwest and central state is bordered to the east and southeast first by a belt known as the glaciated Allegheny Plateau, and then by another belt known as the unglaciated Allegheny Plateau. Most of Ohio is of low relief, but the unglaciated Allegheny Plateau features rugged hills and forests.

Ohio's rugged southeastern quadrant, stretching in an outward bow-like arc along the Ohio River from the West Virginia Panhandle to the outskirts of Cincinnati, forms a distinct socioeconomic unit. Geologically similar to parts of West Virginia and southwestern Pennsylvania, this area's coal mining legacy, dependence on small pockets of old manufacturing establishments, and distinctive regional dialect set this section off from the rest of the state. In 1965, Congress passed the Appalachian Regional Development Act, an attempt to "address the persistent poverty and growing economic despair of the Appalachian Region". It defines 29 Ohio counties as part of Appalachia. While 1/3 of Ohio's land mass is part of the federally defined Appalachian region, only 12.8% of Ohioans live there (1.476 million people.)

Significant Ohio rivers include the Cuyahoga River, Great Miami River, Maumee River, Muskingum River, and Scioto River. The rivers in northern Ohio drain into the northern Atlantic Ocean via Lake Erie and the St. Lawrence River, and those in southern Ohio drain into the Gulf of Mexico via the Ohio River and the Mississippi. Ohio also includes Bass Islands and Kelleys Island. Grand Lake St. Marys in the west-central part of the state was constructed as a supply of water for canals in the canal-building era of 1820–1850. This body of water, over 20 square miles (52 km^{2}), was the largest artificial lake in the world when completed in 1845. Ohio's canal-building projects were not the economic fiasco that similar efforts were in other states. Some cities, such as Dayton, owe their industrial emergence to their location on canals, and as late as 1910 interior canals carried much of the bulk freight of the state.

Areas under the protection of the National Park Service include Cuyahoga Valley National Park, Hopewell Culture National Historical Park, Dayton Aviation Heritage National Historical Park, First Ladies National Historic Site, James A. Garfield National Historic Site, William Howard Taft National Historic Site, Charles Young Buffalo Soldiers National Monument, and Perry's Victory and International Peace Memorial.

=== Fauna and flora ===
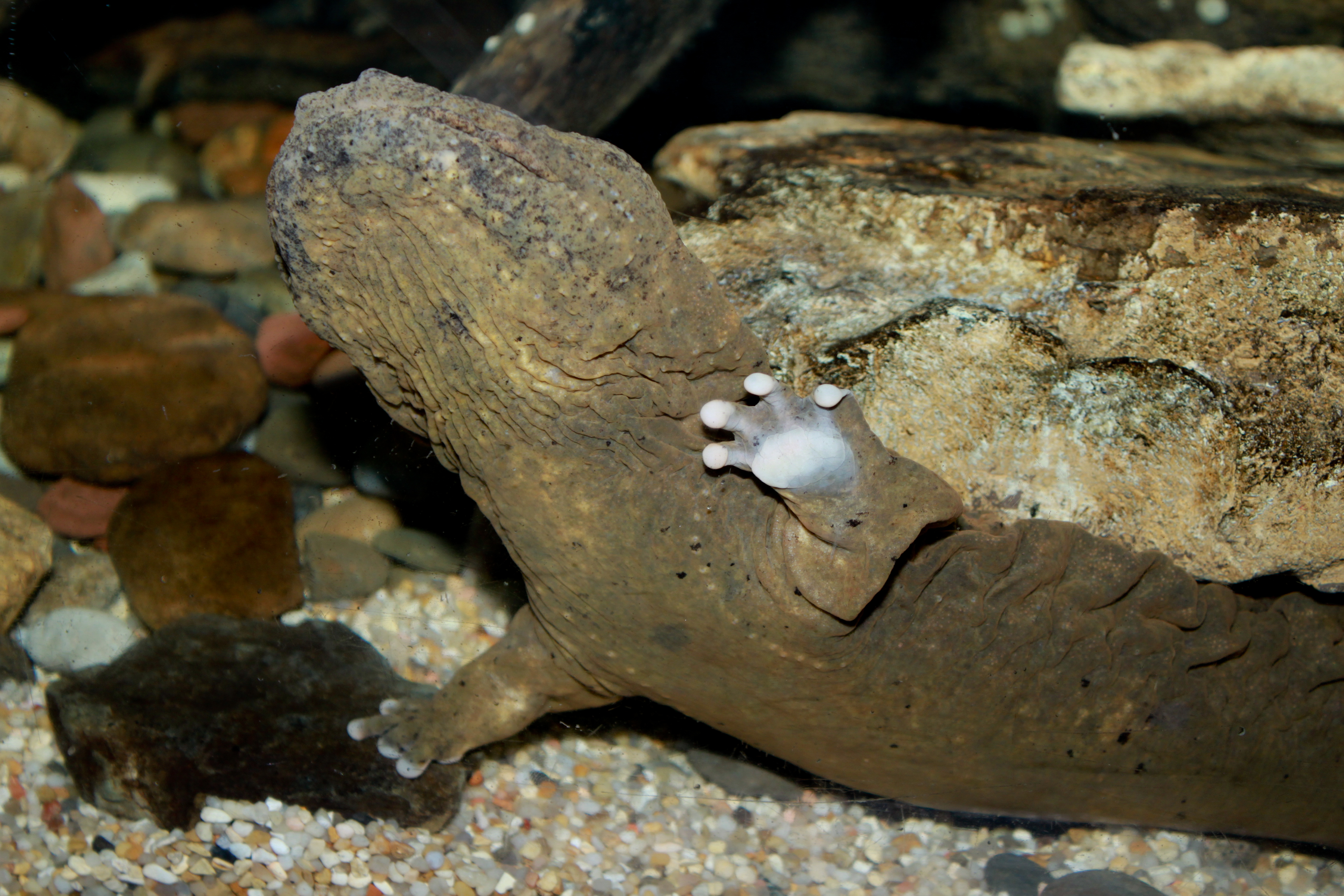
Eastern Hellbender in captivity

Ohio has wide variety of unique animal species. Rare and endangered species include the Eastern Hellbender, which is found in the Southeastern Appalachian region of Ohio and is classified as state endangered. The Eastern Hellbender is the 3rd largest amphibian in the world, and can grow up to 27 inches in length. It is fully aquatic and breathes almost entirely through its skin. Due to this, it is only found in pristine, cool, clear, fast flowing streams and rivers. It is highly threatened by habitat loss, water pollution, and sedimentation due to logging and other human activities.

Although predominantly not in a subtropical climate, some warmer-climate flora and fauna reach well into Ohio. For instance, some trees with more southern ranges, such as the blackjack oak, Quercus marilandica, are found at their northernmost in Ohio just north of the Ohio River. Also evidencing this climatic transition from a subtropical to a continental climate, several plants such as the southern magnolia (Magnolia grandiflora), Albizia julibrissin (mimosa), Crape Myrtle, and even the occasional needle palm are hardy landscape materials regularly used as street, yard, and garden plantings in the Bluegrass region of Ohio. These same plants will simply not thrive in much of the rest of the state. This interesting change may be observed while traveling through Ohio on Interstate 75 from Cincinnati to Toledo. The observant traveler of this diverse state may even catch a glimpse of Cincinnati's common wall lizard, one of the few examples of permanent "subtropical" fauna in Ohio.

=== Climate ===
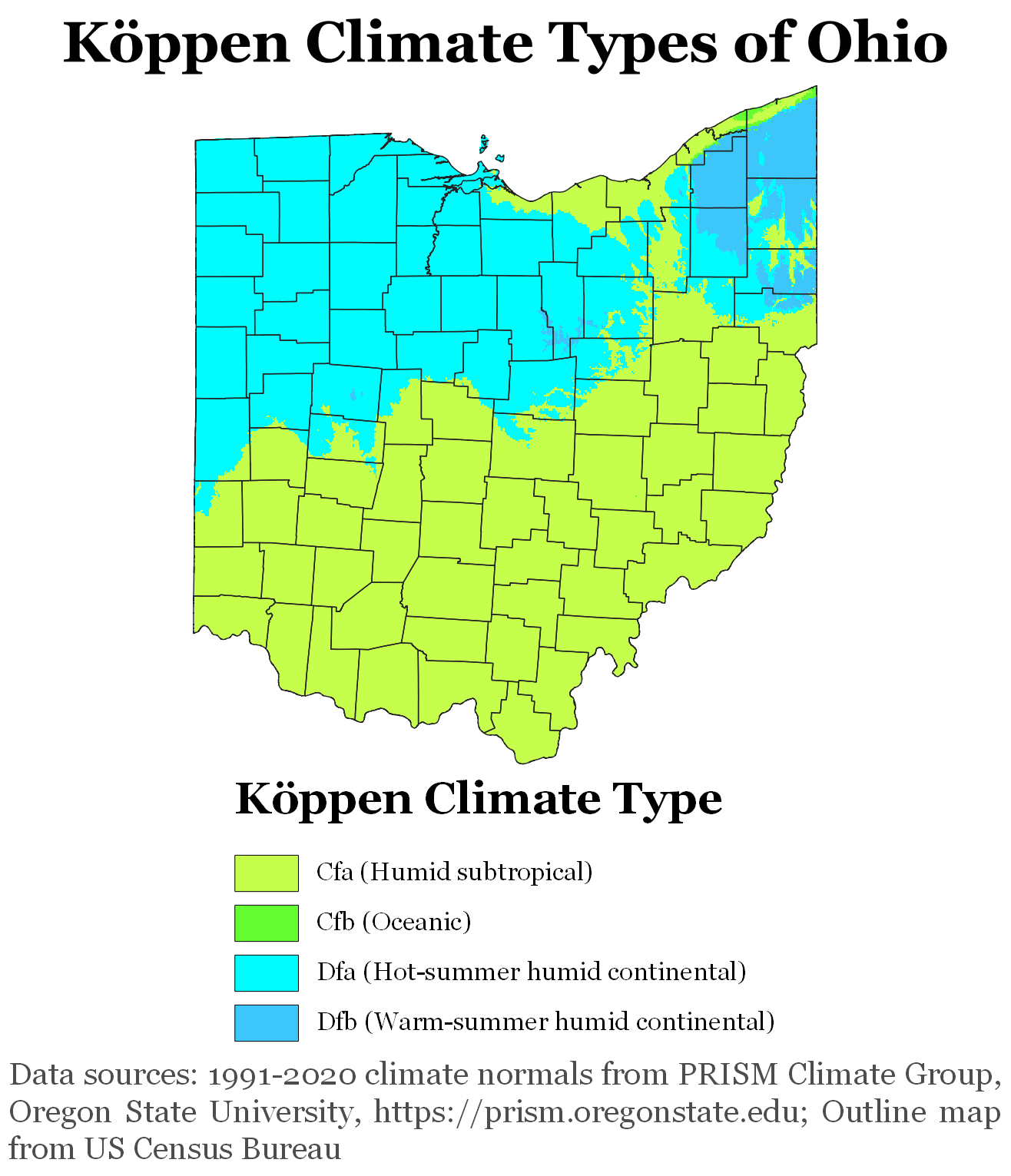
Köppen climate types of Ohio, using 1991–2020 climate normals.

The climate of Ohio is a humid continental climate (Köppen climate classification Dfa/Dfb) throughout most of the state, except in the extreme southern counties of Ohio's Bluegrass region section, which are located on the northern periphery of the humid subtropical climate (Cfa) and Upland South region of the United States. Summers are typically hot and humid throughout Ohio. Winters generally range from cool to cold. Precipitation in Ohio is moderate year-round. Severe weather is not uncommon in the state, although there are typically fewer tornado reports in Ohio than in states located in what is known as the Tornado Alley. Severe lake effect snowstorms are not uncommon on the southeast shore of Lake Erie, which is located in an area designated as the Snowbelt.

The highest recorded temperature was 113 °F (45 °C), near Gallipolis on July 21, 1934. The lowest recorded temperature was −39 °F (−39 °C), at Milligan on February 10, 1899, during the Great Blizzard of 1899.

Average daily maximum and minimum temperatures for selected cities in Ohio
Location	Region	July (°F)	July (°C)	January (°F)	January (°C)
Athens	Appalachian	85/61	29/16	40/21	4/−6
Cincinnati	Southwest	86/66	30/19	39/23	3/−5
Cleveland	Northeast	82/64	28/18	34/21	1/−5
Columbus	Central	85/65	29/18	36/22	2/−5
Dayton	Miami Valley	87/67	31/19	36/22	2/−5
Toledo	Northwest	84/62	29/17	32/18	0/−7
Youngstown	Northeast	81/60	27/15	32/19	0/−7

The worst weather disaster in Ohio history occurred along the Great Miami River in 1913. Known as the Great Dayton Flood, the entire Miami River watershed flooded, including the downtown business district of Dayton. As a result, the Miami Conservancy District was created as the first major floodplain engineering project in Ohio and the United States.

Although few have registered as noticeable to the average resident, more than 200 earthquakes with a magnitude of 2.0 or higher have occurred in Ohio since 1776. The Western Ohio Seismic Zone and a portion of the Southern Great Lakes Seismic Zone are located in the state, and numerous faults lie under the surface.

The most substantial known earthquake in Ohio history was the Anna (Shelby County) earthquake, which occurred on March 9, 1937. It was centered in western Ohio, with a magnitude of 5.4, and was of intensity VIII. Other significant earthquakes in Ohio include: one of magnitude 4.8 near Lima on September 19, 1884; one of magnitude 4.2 near Portsmouth on May 17, 1901; and one of 5.0 in LeRoy Township in Lake County on January 31, 1986, which continued to trigger 13 aftershocks of magnitude 0.5 to 2.4 for two months.

Notable Ohio earthquakes in the 21st century include one occurring on December 31, 2011, approximately 4 kilometers (2.5 mi) northwest of Youngstown, and one occurring on June 10, 2019, approximately 5 kilometers (3.1 mi) north-northwest of Eastlake under Lake Erie; both registered a 4.0 magnitude.

=== Cities ===
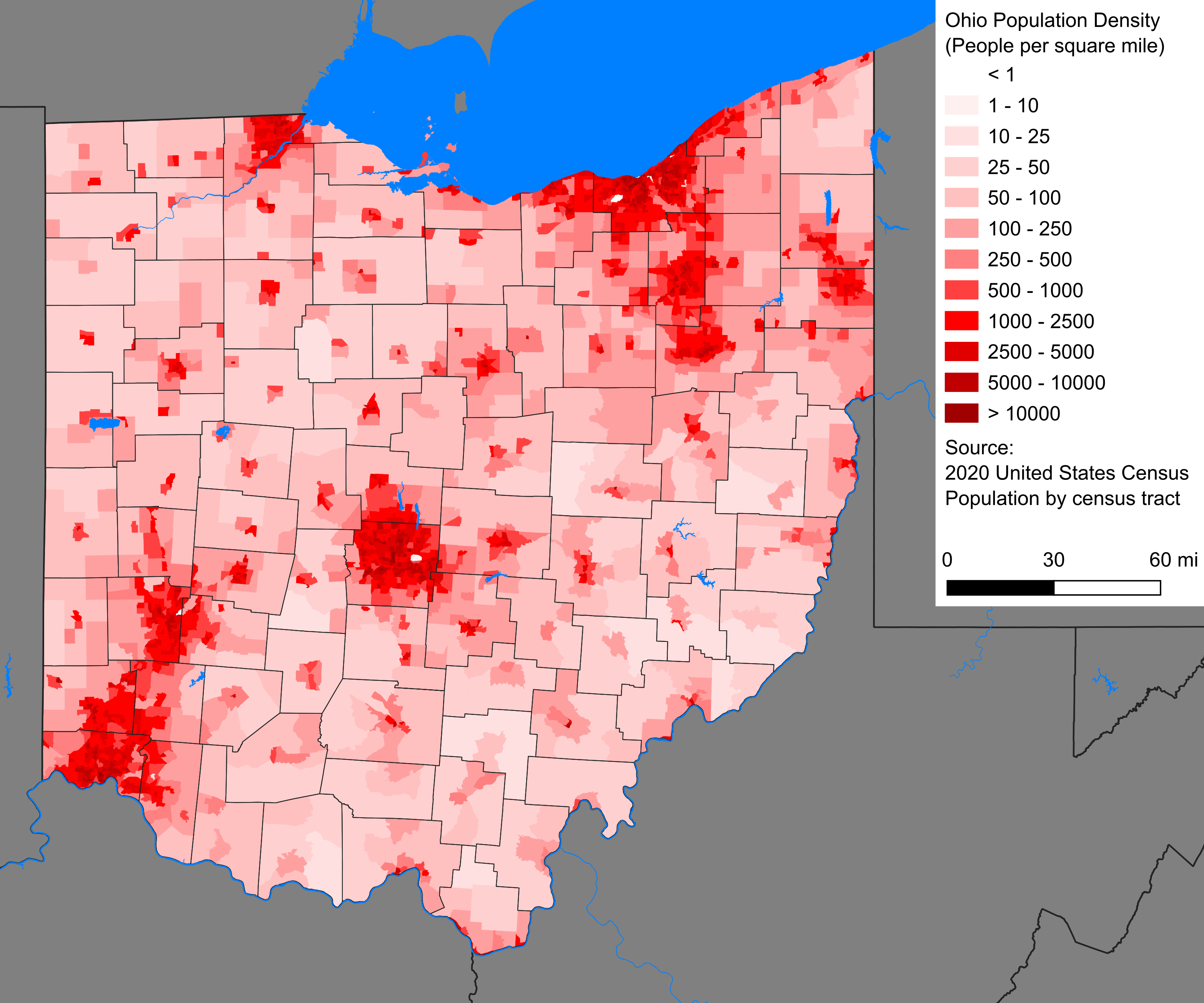
Ohio population density map

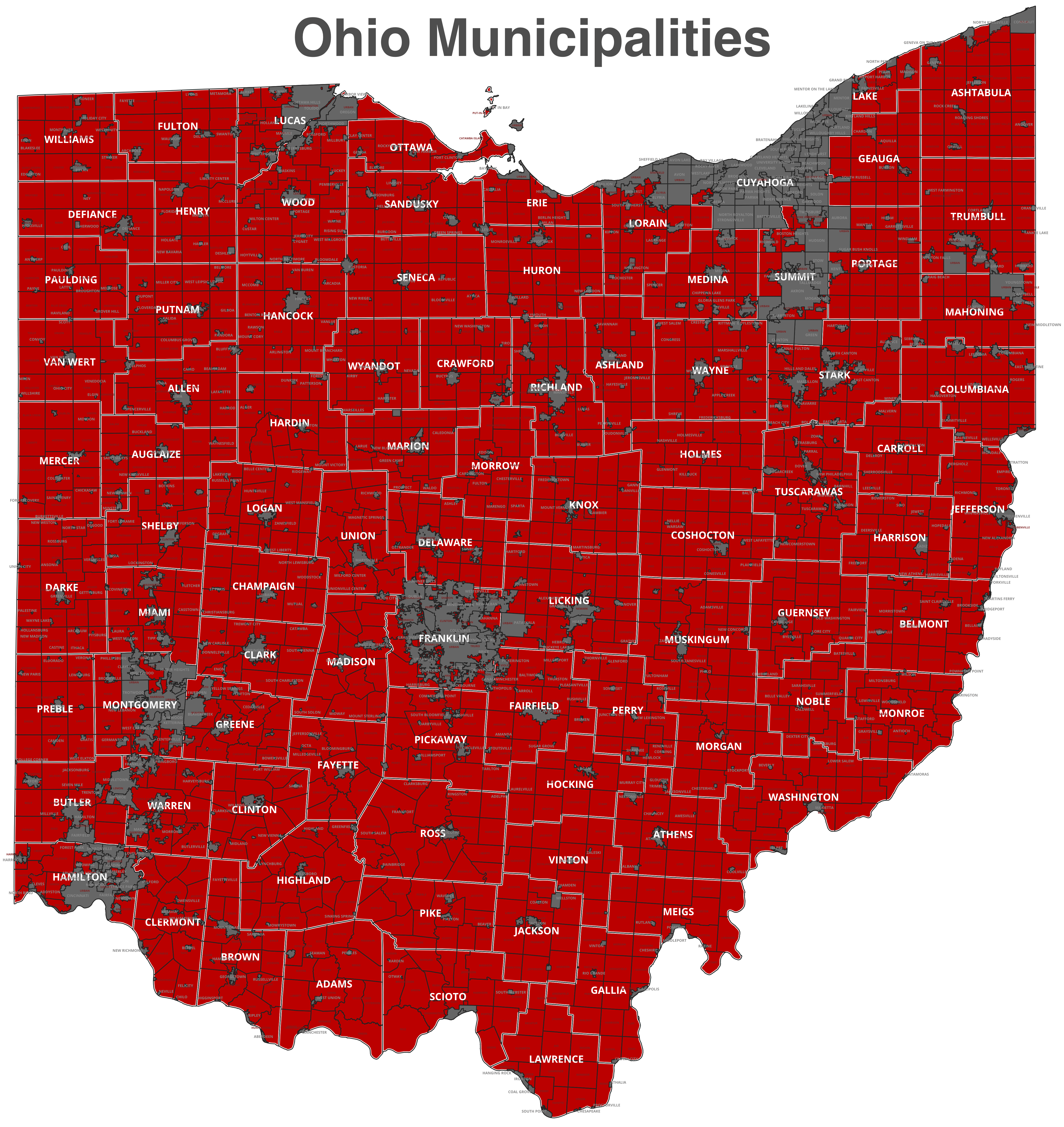
Ohio Municipalities

There are 13 metropolitan statistical areas in Ohio, anchored by 16 cities, as defined by the U.S. Office of Management and Budget. Additionally, 30 Ohio cities function as centers of micropolitan statistical areas, urban clusters smaller than that of metropolitan areas. Ohio's three largest cities are Columbus, Cleveland, and Cincinnati.

Columbus, the state capital near Ohio's geographic center, is known for Ohio State University and a large concentration of finance, insurance, healthcare, and research institutions. Major employers include Battelle Memorial Institute, Cardinal Health, Huntington Bancshares, Nationwide Children's Hospital, and Nationwide Mutual Insurance Company.

Cleveland is located along Lake Erie in Northeast Ohio and developed as a major manufacturing and healthcare center shaped by immigrant communities and New England heritage. The broader region includes Akron and Canton and is known for companies such as Progressive Corporation, Sherwin-Williams, and Goodyear Tire, institutions including the Cleveland Clinic and Case Western Reserve University, and cultural attractions such as the Cleveland Museum of Art and Rock and Roll Hall of Fame.

Cincinnati anchors Southwest Ohio and a metropolitan area extending into Kentucky and Indiana. The region is known for companies including Procter & Gamble, Kroger, and Fifth Third Bank, as well as institutions such as the University of Cincinnati and Cincinnati Symphony Orchestra. Nearby Dayton and Springfield are in the Miami Valley, which is home to the extensive Wright-Patterson Air Force Base.

Toledo and Lima are the principal cities of Northwest Ohio, historically associated with the glass industry and companies such as Owens Corning and Owens-Illinois. In eastern Ohio, Steubenville is the largest urban center in the Appalachian region. Ohio also contains portions of metropolitan areas centered in neighboring states, including Huntington and Wheeling in West Virginia. Ohio is the US state with the highest number of cities with the same name as UK cities.

Largest cities or towns in Ohio Source: 2020 U.S. Census
Rank	Name	County	Pop.	Rank	Name	County	Pop.
1	Columbus	Franklin	905,748	11	Youngstown	Mahoning	60,068
2	Cleveland	Cuyahoga	372,624	12	Springfield	Clark	58,662
3	Cincinnati	Hamilton	309,317	13	Kettering	Montgomery	57,862
4	Toledo	Lucas	270,871	14	Elyria	Lorain	52,656
5	Akron	Summit	190,469	15	Cuyahoga Falls	Summit	51,114
6	Dayton	Montgomery	137,644	16	Middletown	Butler	50,987
7	Parma	Cuyahoga	81,146	17	Lakewood	Cuyahoga	50,942
8	Canton	Stark	70,872	18	Newark	Licking	49,934
9	Lorain	Lorain	65,211	19	Euclid	Cuyahoga	49,692
10	Hamilton	Butler	62,082	20	Dublin	Franklin	49,328

== Demographics ==
Historical population
Census	Pop.	Note	%±
1800	45,365		—
1810	230,760		408.7%
1820	581,434		152.0%
1830	937,903		61.3%
1840	1,519,467		62.0%
1850	1,980,329		30.3%
1860	2,339,511		18.1%
1870	2,665,260		13.9%
1880	3,198,062		20.0%
1890	3,672,329		14.8%
1900	4,157,545		13.2%
1910	4,767,121		14.7%
1920	5,759,394		20.8%
1930	6,646,697		15.4%
1940	6,907,612		3.9%
1950	7,946,627		15.0%
1960	9,706,397		22.1%
1970	10,652,017		9.7%
1980	10,797,630		1.4%
1990	10,847,115		0.5%
2000	11,353,140		4.7%
2010	11,536,504		1.6%
2020	11,799,448		2.3%
2025 (est.)	11,900,510		0.9%
Source: 1910–2020

=== Population ===
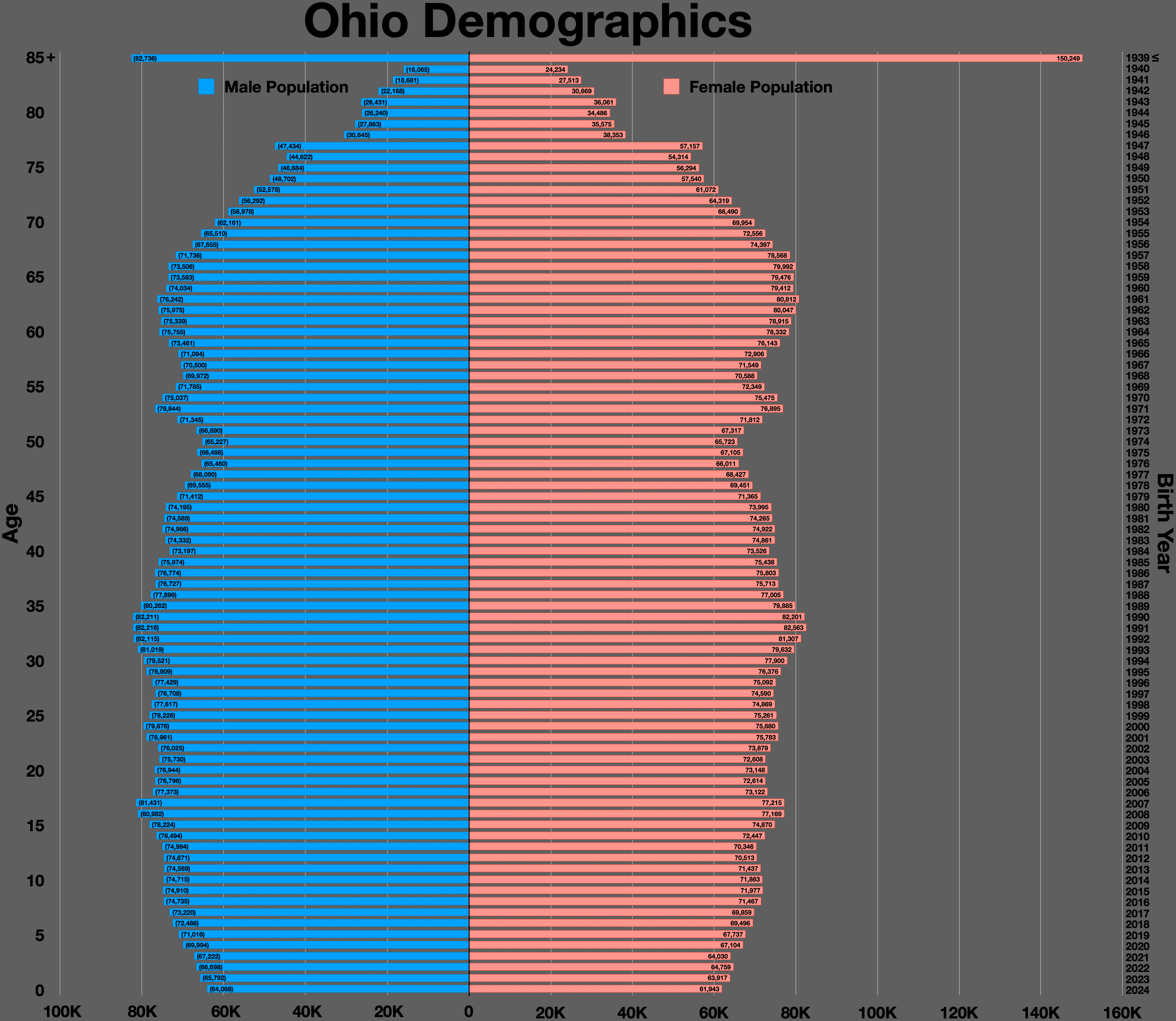
Ohio population pyramid

From just over 45,000 residents in 1800, Ohio's population grew faster than 10% per decade (except for the 1940 census) until the 1970 census, which recorded just over 10.65 million Ohioans. Growth then slowed for the next four decades. The United States Census Bureau counted 11,808,848 in the 2020 census, a 2.4% increase since the 2010 United States census. Ohio's population growth lags that of the entire United States, and whites are found in a greater density than the U.S. average. As of 2000, Ohio's center of population is located in Morrow County, in the county seat of Mount Gilead. This is approximately 6,346 feet (1,934 m) south and west of Ohio's population center in 1990.

View source data.

Population growth by county in Ohio between the 2010 and 2020 censuses. -10 to -5 percent -5 to -2 percent -2 to 0 percent 0 to 2 percent 2 to 5 percent 5 to 10 percent 10 to 20 percent More than 20 percent

As of 2011, 27.6% of Ohio's children under the age of 1 belonged to minority groups. Approximately 6.2% of Ohio's population was under five years of age, 23.7% under 18 years of age, and 14.1% were 65 or older; females made up an estimated 51.2% of the population.

According to HUD's 2022 Annual Homeless Assessment Report, there were an estimated 10,654 homeless people in Ohio.

==== Vital statistics ====
Note: Births in table do not add up because Hispanics are counted both by their ethnicity and by their race, giving a higher overall number.

Live births by single race/ethnicity of mother
Race	2014	2015	2016	2017	2018	2019	2020	2021	2022	2023	2024
White	104,102 (74.6%)	103,586 (74.4%)	100,225 (72.6%)	98,762 (72.1%)	97,423 (72.1%)	95,621 (71.1%)	92,033 (71.2%)	92,761 (71.5%)	90,671 (70.7%)	88,799 (70.0%)	87,830 (69.3%)
Black	24,931 (17.9%)	25,078 (18.0%)	22,337 (16.2%)	22,431 (16.4%)	22,201 (16.4%)	22,555 (16.8%)	21,447 (16.6%)	20,748 (16.0%)	20,380 (15.9%)	20,107 (15.8%)	19,693 (15.5%)
Asian	4,232 (3.0%)	4,367 (3.1%)	4,311 (3.1%)	4,380 (3.2%)	4,285 (3.2%)	4,374 (3.3%)	3,995 (3.1%)	3,862 (3.0%)	3,923 (3.1%)	3,862 (3.0%)	3,968 (3.1%)
Hispanic (any race)	6,884 (4.9%)	6,974 (5.0%)	7,420 (5.4%)	7,468 (5.5%)	7,432 (5.5%)	7,725 (5.7%)	7,669 (5.9%)	8,228 (6.3%)	9,062 (7.1%)	9,748 (7.7%)	10,761 (8.5%)
Total	139,467 (100%)	139,264 (100%)	138,085 (100%)	136,832 (100%)	135,134 (100%)	134,461 (100%)	129,191 (100%)	129,791 (100%)	128,231 (100%)	126,896 (100%)	126,795 (100%)

- Since 2016, data for births of White Hispanic origin are not collected, but included in one Hispanic group; persons of Hispanic origin may be of any race.

=== Ancestry ===
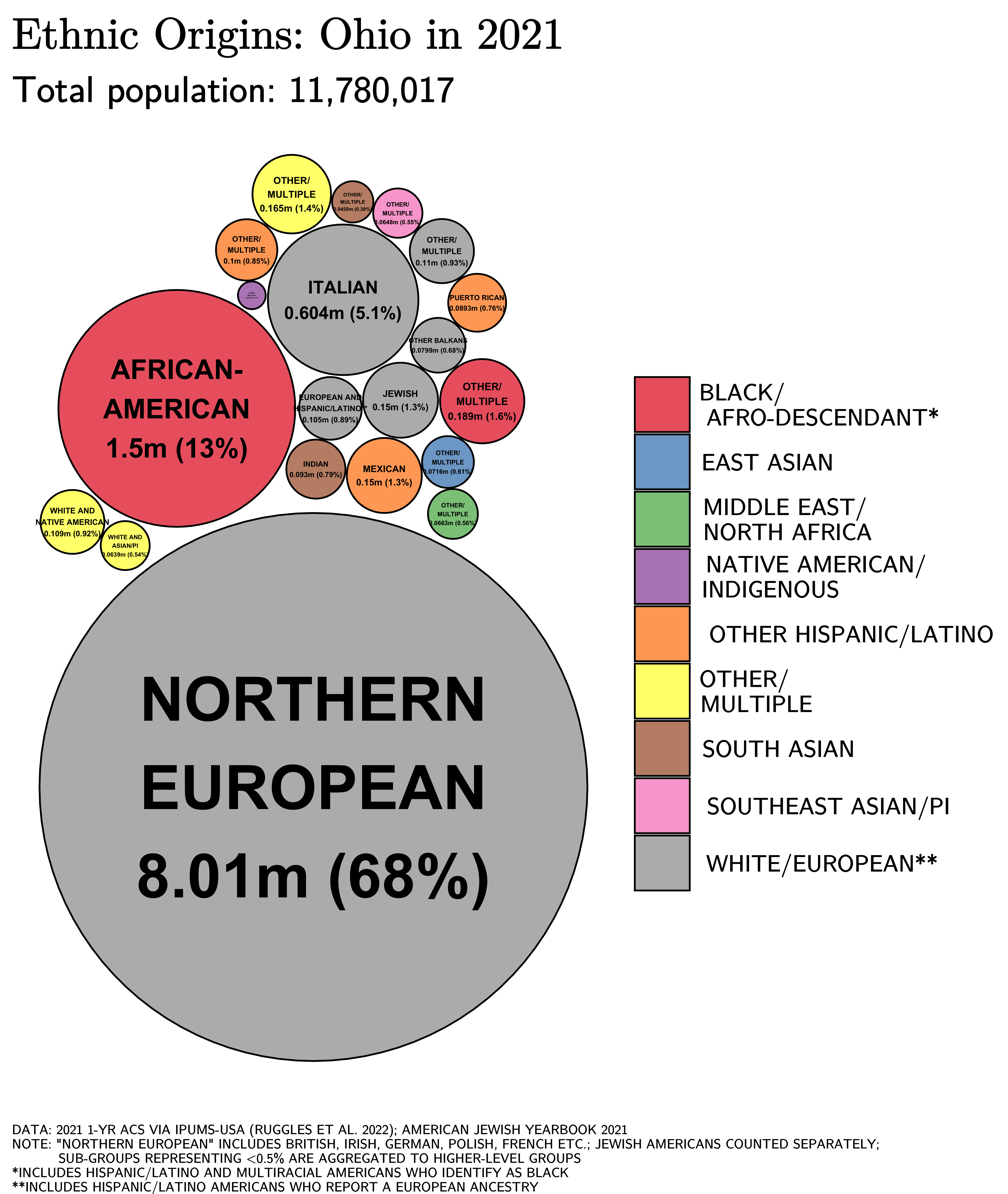
Ethnic origins in Ohio

Ethnic composition as of the 2020 census
Race and ethnicity	Alone	Total
White (non-Hispanic)	75.9%	79.9%
African American (non-Hispanic)	12.3%	14.0%
Hispanic or Latino (Note: Persons of Hispanic or Latino origin are not distinguished between total and partial ancestry.)	—	4.4%
Asian	2.5%	3.1%
Native American	0.2%	1.7%
Pacific Islander	0.04%	0.1%
Other	0.4%	1.2%

Ohio – Racial and ethnic composition Note: the US Census treats Hispanic/Latino as an ethnic category. This table excludes Latinos from the racial categories and assigns them to a separate category. Hispanics/Latinos may be of any race.
Race / Ethnicity (NH = Non-Hispanic)	Pop 2000	Pop 2010	Pop 2020	% 2000	% 2010	% 2020
White alone (NH)	9,538,111	9,359,263	8,954,135	84.01%	81.13%	75.89%
Black or African American alone (NH)	1,290,662	1,389,115	1,457,180	11.37%	12.04%	12.35%
Native American or Alaska Native alone (NH)	21,985	20,906	18,949	0.19%	0.18%	0.16%
Asian alone (NH)	131,670	190,765	296,604	1.16%	1.65%	2.51%
Pacific Islander alone (NH)	2,336	3,400	4,493	0.02%	0.03%	0.04%
Other race alone (NH)	13,483	15,158	45,217	0.12%	0.13%	0.38%
Mixed race or Multiracial (NH)	137,770	203,223	501,562	1.21%	1.76%	4.25%
Hispanic or Latino (any race)	217,123	354,674	521,308	1.91%	3.07%	4.42%
Total	11,353,140	11,536,504	11,799,448	100.00%	100.00%	100.00%

Ohio historic racial breakdown of population
Racial and ethnic composition	1990	2000	2010	2020
White	87.8%	85.0%	82.7%	77.0%
African American	10.6%	11.5%	12.2%	12.5%
Asian	0.8%	1.2%	1.7%	2.5%
Native	0.2%	0.2%	0.2%	0.3%
Native Hawaiian and other Pacific Islander	–	–	–	–
Other race	0.5%	0.8%	1.1%	1.9%
Two or more races	–	1.4%	2.1%	5.8%

In 2010, there were 469,700 foreign-born residents in Ohio, corresponding to 4.1% of the total population. Of these, 229,049 (2.0%) were naturalized U.S. citizens and 240,699 (2.1%) were not. The largest groups were: Mexico (54,166), India (50,256), China (34,901), Germany (19,219), Philippines (16,410), United Kingdom (15,917), Canada (14,223), Russia (11,763), South Korea (11,307), and Ukraine (10,681). Though predominantly white, Ohio has large black populations in all major metropolitan areas throughout the state, Ohio has a significant Hispanic population made up of Mexicans in Toledo and Columbus, and Puerto Ricans in Cleveland and Columbus, and also has a significant and diverse Asian population in Columbus.

Ancestry groups (which the census defines as not including racial terms) in the state were: 26.5% German, 14.1% Irish, 9.0% English, 6.4% Italian, 3.8% Polish, 2.5% French, 1.9% Scottish, 1.7% Hungarian, 1.6% Dutch, 1.5% Mexican, 1.2% Slovak, 1.1% Welsh, and 1.1% Scotch-Irish. Ancestries claimed by less than 1% of the population include Sub-Saharan African, Puerto Rican, Swiss, Swedish, Arab, Greek, Norwegian, Romanian, Austrian, Lithuanian, Finnish, West Indian, Portuguese and Slovene.

=== Languages ===
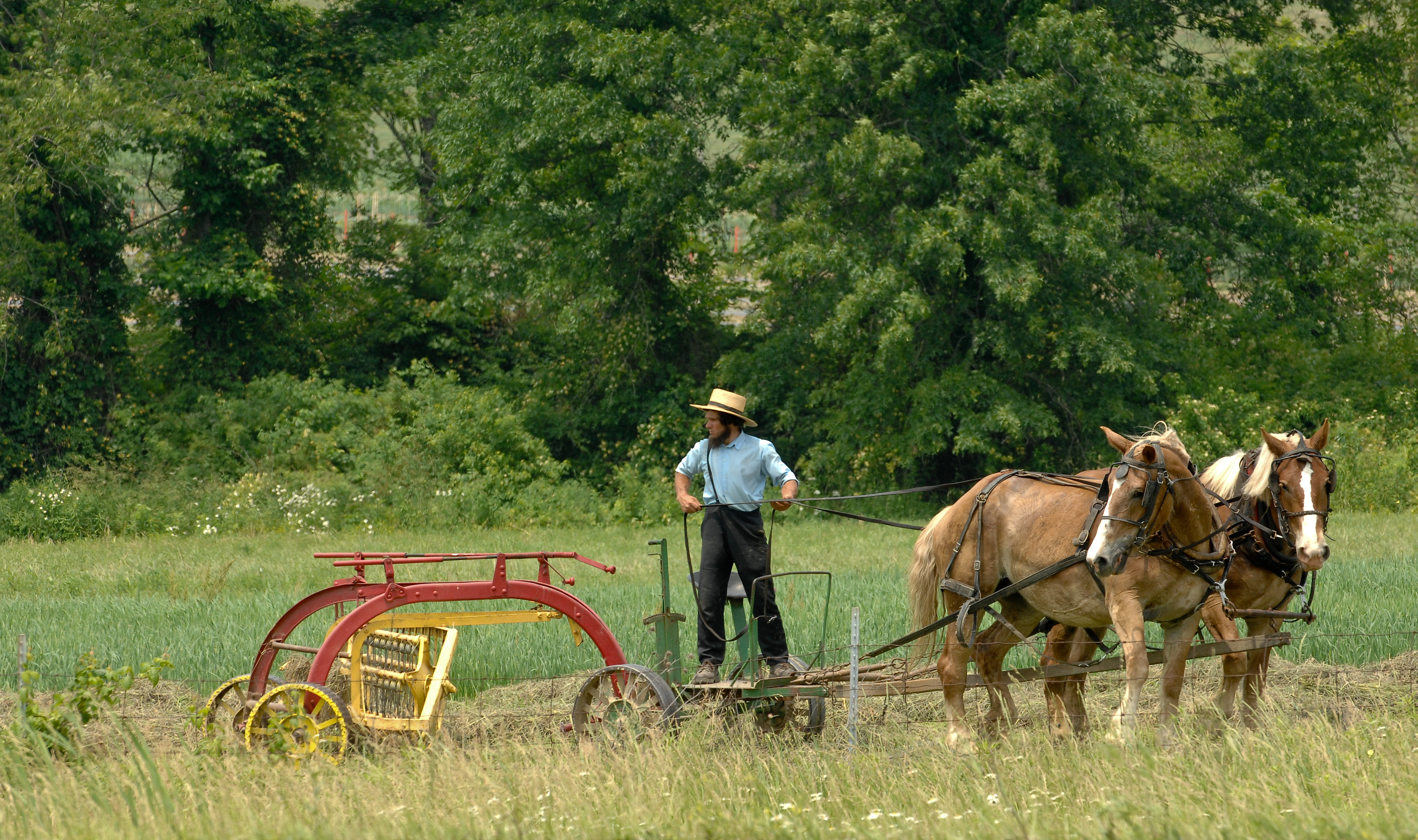
An Amish farmer raking hay in southeast Ohio

About 6.7% of the population age 5 years and older reported speaking a language other than English, with 2.2% of the population speaking Spanish, 2.6% speaking other Indo-European languages, 1.1% speaking Asian and Austronesian languages, and 0.8% speaking other languages. Numerically: 10,100,586 spoke English, 239,229 Spanish, 55,970 German, 38,990 Chinese, 33,125 Arabic, and 32,019 French. In addition, 59,881 spoke a Slavic language and 42,673 spoke another West Germanic language according to the 2010 census. Ohio also had the nation's largest population of Slovene speakers, second largest of Slovak speakers, second largest of Pennsylvania Dutch (German) speakers, and the third largest of Serbian speakers.

=== Religion ===
Religious self-identification, per Public Religion Research Institute's 2021 American Values Survey
1. Protestantism (46.0%)
2. Catholicism (18.0%)
3. Unaffiliated (30.0%)
4. Judaism (2.00%)
5. Hinduism (1.00%)
6. Other (3.00%)

According to Public Religion Research Institute's 2021 American Values Survey, 64% of Ohioans identified as Christian. Specifically, 19% of Ohio's population identified as Mainline Protestant, 17% as Evangelical Protestant, 7% as Historically Black Protestant, and 18% as Catholic. Roughly 30% of the population were unaffiliated with any religious body. Small minorities of Jews (2%), Hindus (1%), Jehovah's Witnesses (<1%), Muslims (<1%), Buddhists (<1%), Mormons (<1%), and other faiths exist according to this study. Altogether, those identifying with a religion or spiritual tradition were 70% of the state's population.

Per the Association of Religion Data Archives's (ARDA) 2020 study, Christianity remained the predominant religion. Non-denominational Christianity, numbering 1,411,863, were the largest Protestant cohort, although Catholicism remained the single-largest denomination with 1,820,233 adherents. According to the ARDA, in 2010 the largest Christian denominations by adherents were the Catholic Church with 1,992,567; the United Methodist Church with 496,232; the Evangelical Lutheran Church in America with 223,253, the Southern Baptist Convention with 171,000, the Christian Churches and Churches of Christ with 141,311, the United Church of Christ with 118,000, and the Presbyterian Church (USA) with 110,000. With about 80,000 adherents in 2020, Ohio had the second largest Amish population of all U.S. states, only behind neighboring Pennsylvania.

According to a Pew Forum poll in 2014, a majority of Ohioans, 56%, felt religion was "very important", 25% that it was "somewhat important", and 19% that religion was "not too important/not important at all". Among them, 38% of Ohioans indicate that they attend religious services at least once weekly, 32% occasionally, and 30% seldom or never.

== Economy ==
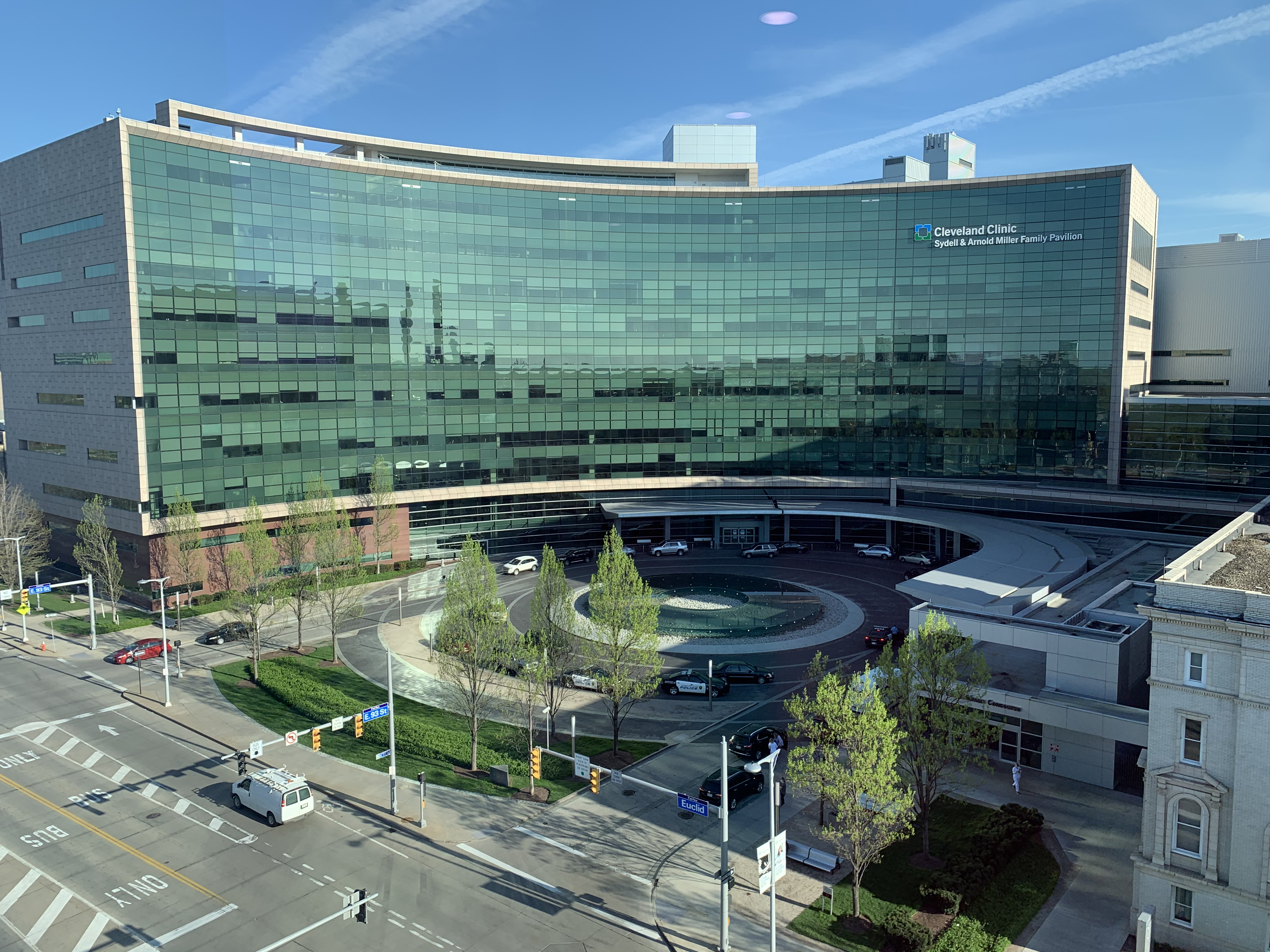
The Cleveland Clinic is one of Ohio's largest employers and is included in the top hospital systems worldwide.

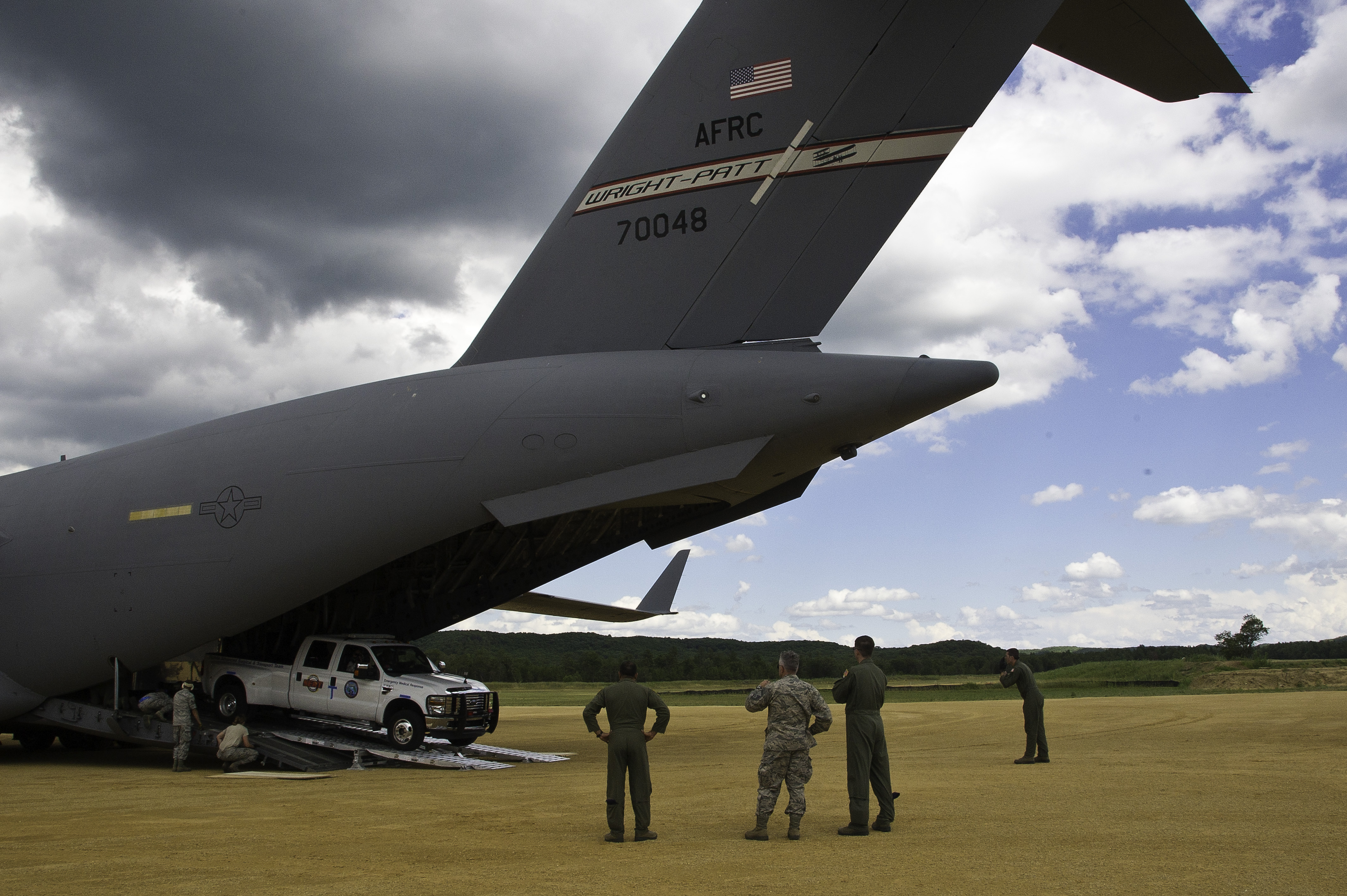
Wright-Patterson Air Force Base, near Dayton, is among the U.S. military's largest bases.

In 2023, there were 5,081,279 people employed in Ohio. There were 255,049 unique employer establishments, and 909,227 non-employer establishments. In 2010, Ohio was ranked second in the country for best business climate by Site Selection magazine, based on a business-activity database. Ohio has won three consecutive Governor's Cup awards from the magazine, based on business growth and developments. Ohio's gross domestic product (GDP) was $626 billion in 2016. This ranks Ohio's economy as the seventh-largest among all 50 states and Washington, D.C. In 2025, 99.6% of businesses in Ohio were small businesses, which employed 2.2 million people, or 43.8% of the state's work force.

Ohio's unemployment rate was 4.9% in May 2025, down from 10.7% in May 2010. In 2015, Ohio was lacking 45,000 jobs compared to the pre-recession numbers of 2007. The labor force participation in April 2015 was 63%, slightly above the national average. In 2023, Ohio's per capita income was $60,402, ranking 38th in the U.S., and the state's median household income was $65,720. Also in 2023, 13.4% of the population was living below the poverty line.

In 2009, the manufacturing and financial activities sectors each composed 18.3% of Ohio's GDP, making them Ohio's largest industries by percentage of GDP. Ohio has the third largest manufacturing workforce behind California and Texas. Ohio has the largest bioscience sector in the Midwest, and is a national leader in the "green" economy. In 2009, Ohio was the largest producer in the country of plastics, rubber, fabricated metals, electrical equipment, and appliances.

In 2009, Ohio's largest employment sector was trade/transportation/utilities, employing 1,010,000 Ohioans, or 19.4% of Ohio's workforce. The health care and education sector employed 825,000 Ohioans (15.8%). In 2009, government employed 787,000 Ohioans (15.1%), manufacturing employed 669,000 Ohioans (12.9%), and professional and technical services employed 638,000 Ohioans (12.2%). Ohio's manufacturing sector is the third-largest of all fifty United States states in terms of gross domestic product. In 2008, fifty-nine of the United States' top 1,000 publicly traded companies by revenue were headquartered in Ohio, including Procter & Gamble, Goodyear Tire & Rubber, AK Steel, Timken, Abercrombie & Fitch, and Wendy's.

Ohio is one of 41 states with its own lottery, the Ohio Lottery. As of 2020, the Ohio Lottery had contributed more than $26 billion to education since 1974.

Income inequality in Ohio, both before and after taxes, has risen significantly since the 1970s. Ohio's overall income grew in Ohio from 2009 to 2012, with an overall 7.1% increase in income growth. The top 1% had a 37.0% in income growth, while the bottom 99% grew their income by only 2.3%. The top 1% accounted for 71.9% of the overall shared income during this period. The burden of income tax falls disproportionately on lower-income tax brackets. In 2018, the bottom 20% of earners contributed 12.3% of their income towards various taxes, while the top 1% only paid 6.5%.

== Culture ==
=== Art ===
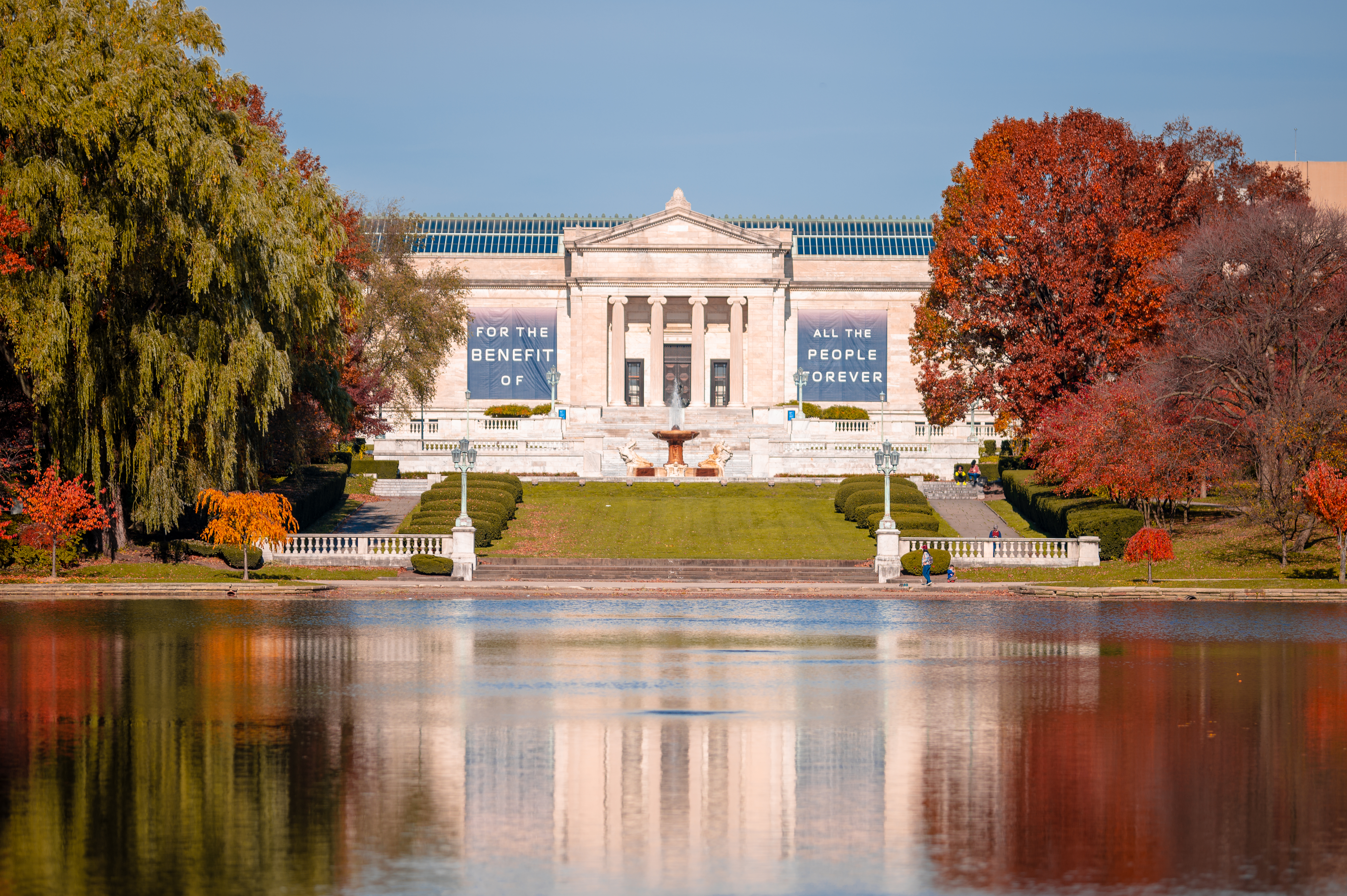
With about 770,000 annual visitors, the Cleveland Museum of Art is among the most visited art museums in the United States.

Art in Ohio includes major museums and university galleries. The Cleveland Museum of Art, founded in 1913, houses collections of Asian, European, Egyptian, and American art. Other major museums include the Toledo Museum of Art, known for its glass collection, and the Cincinnati Art Museum, one of the oldest art museums in the Midwest. Ohio also contains specialized such as the Butler Institute of American Art, the first museum dedicated exclusively to American art. Contemporary art institutions include the Museum of Contemporary Art Cleveland and the Wexner Center for the Arts.

Many Ohio museums developed through donations by private donors and partnerships with universities. Institutions such as the Allen Memorial Art Museum, affiliated with Oberlin College, and the Wexner Center for the Arts, affiliated with Ohio State University, combine public exhibitions with academic programs. Statewide arts funding is administered in part through the Ohio Arts Council, which supports museums, galleries, exhibitions, and arts organizations throughout the state.

Ohio also contains performing arts institutions focused on theater and dance. Playhouse Square in Cleveland is the nation's second-largest performing arts center, home to ten theaters. The Columbus Association for the Performing Arts manages seven historic Columbus area theaters. Other theater institutions include the Cincinnati Playhouse in the Park and numerous university-affiliated theater programs.

=== Cuisine ===
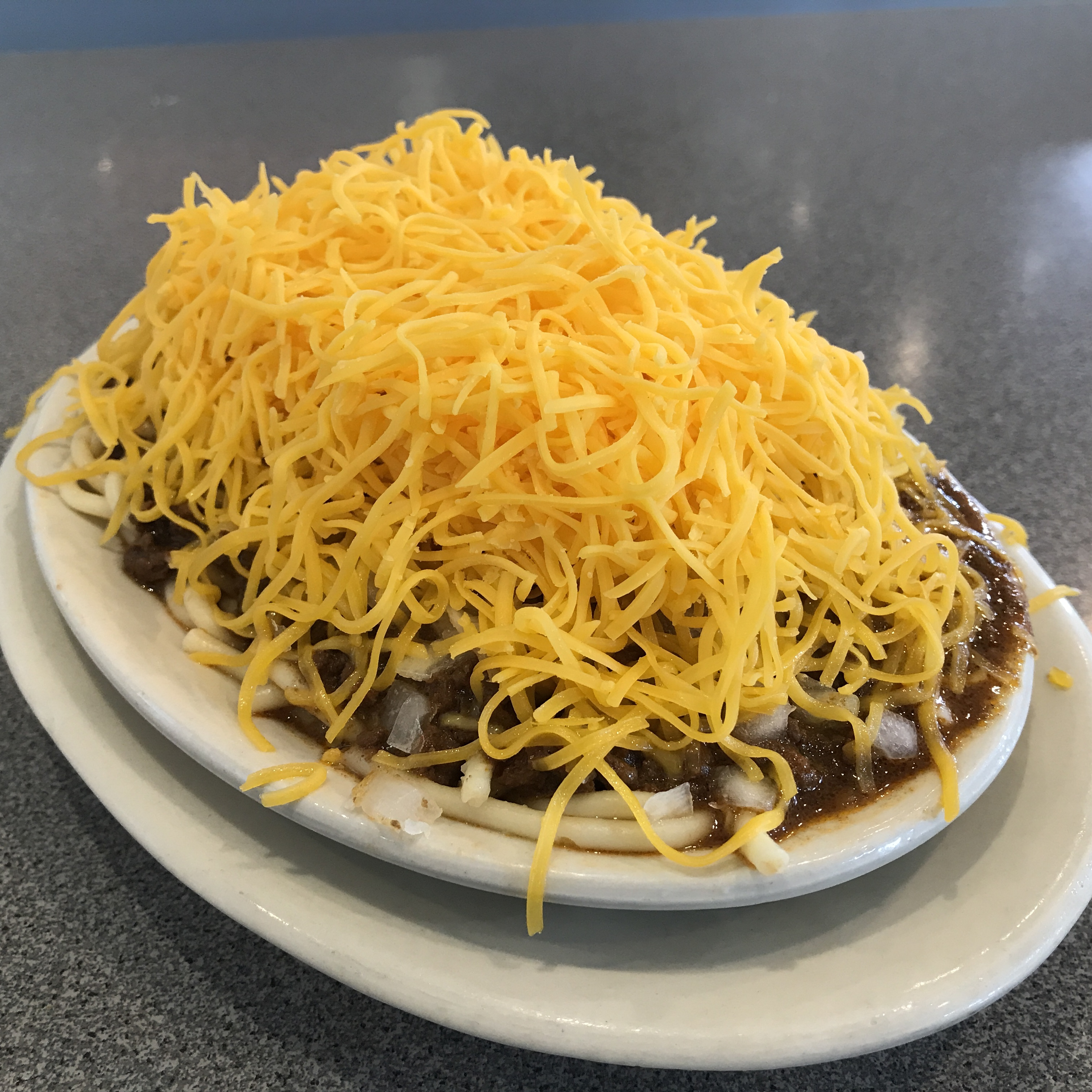
Cincinnati chili (pictured here as a "four-way") is a Mediterranean-spiced meat sauce used as a topping for spaghetti or hot dogs.

Buckeyes are a variation of standard peanut butter cups popular in Ohio. Coated in chocolate with a partially exposed center of peanut butter fudge, the candy resembles the appearance of the nut that grows on the state tree, commonly known as the buckeye. The Klondike bar originated in Mansfield in 1922. Dum Dums lollipops were originally produced in Bellevue, Ohio in 1924, and have been made by Spangler Candy Company in Bryan, Ohio since 1953.

Cincinnati-style chili is a Greek-inspired meat sauce used as a topping for spaghetti or hot dogs. Additionally, red beans, chopped onions, and shredded cheese are offered as extra toppings referred to as "ways". German immigrants in Cincinnati invented goetta, a breakfast sausage made of meat scraps, spices, and oats. It is typically eaten fried.

Other local dishes include the Polish Boy, "the signature sandwich of Cleveland", a kielbasa sausage topped with coleslaw, French fries, and barbecue sauce and served on a bun. Johnny Marzetti is a casserole dish thought to have originated from Columbus and consisting of some variation of noodles, ground beef, tomatoes, and cheese.

Ohio has hosted nationwide fast food companies, including the first Arby's, Buffalo Wild Wings, Stewart's, and Wendy's; the latter is headquartered in Dublin, Ohio. The hamburger chain White Castle is also based in Columbus.

=== Music ===
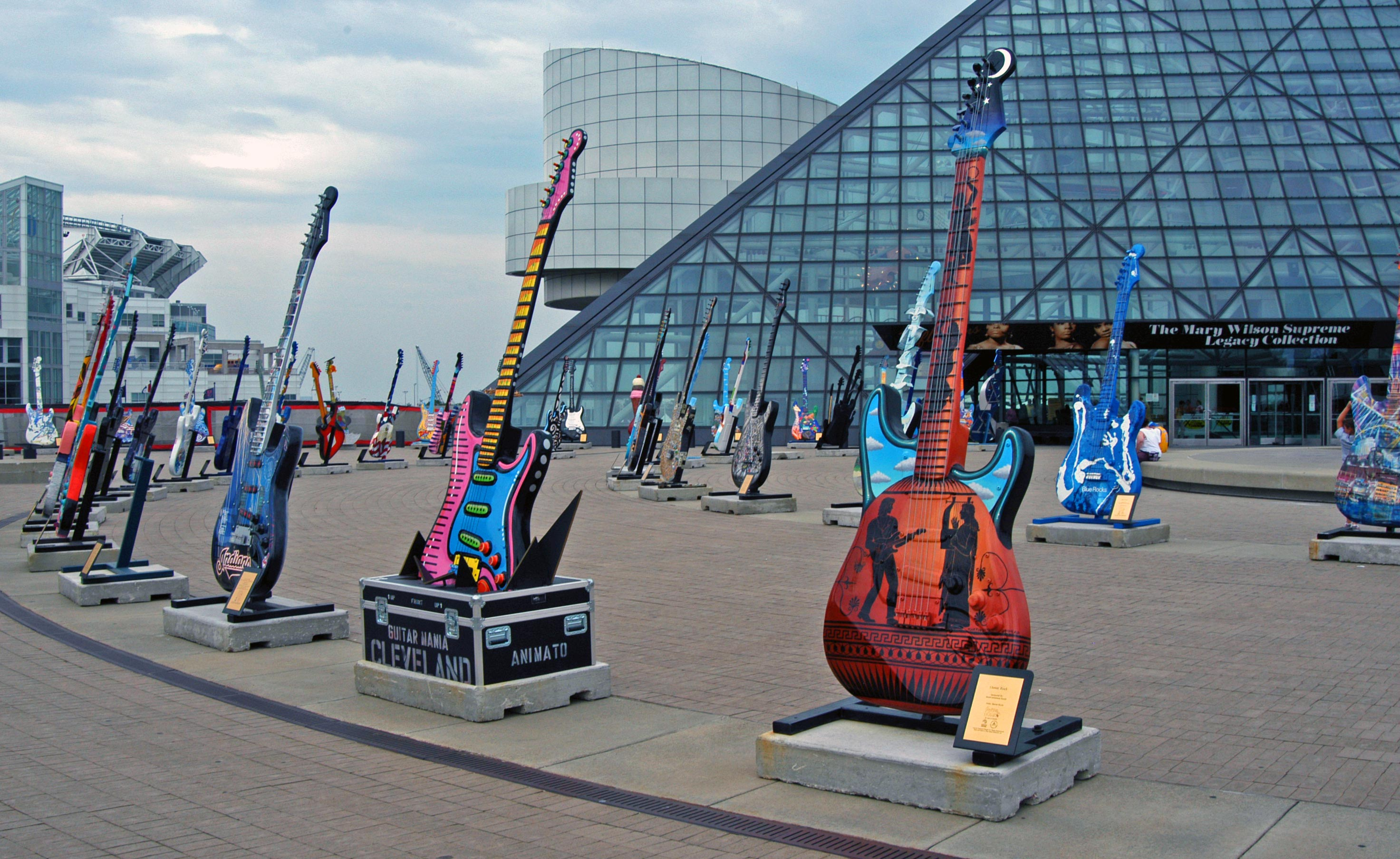
The Rock and Roll Hall of Fame in Cleveland

The Rock and Roll Hall of Fame and the Rhythm and Blues Music Hall of Fame are both located in Cleveland. Cleveland disc jockey Alan Freed is credited with coining the term and promoting rock and roll in the early 1950s; Freed hosted the Moondog Coronation Ball, the first live rock and roll concert in Cleveland in 1952.. Cincinnati is home to the American Classical Music Hall of Fame and Museum. Six Ohio musicians or groups are Rock and Roll Hall of Fame members: Dave Grohl (of Nirvana and Foo Fighters), the Isley Brothers, Nine Inch Nails, Bobby Womack, Benjamin Orr (of The Cars), and Chrissie Hynde (of The Pretenders), in addition to Alan Freed.

Other musicians from Ohio have contributed to a wide range of music genres. Early 20th century performers included blues singer Mamie Smith and polka musician Frankie Yankovic, while mid-century popular entertainers included Dean Martin, Doris Day, and the McGuire Sisters. Ohio later produced artists associated with rhythm and blues and funk, including Howard Hewett, Shirley Murdock, and Bootsy Collins. Rock and alternative acts from the state include Devo, Marilyn Manson, The Black Keys, Twenty One Pilots, and Starset, while later hip hop and pop performers include Kid Cudi and John Legend.

The Cleveland Orchestra is one of the historic Big Five orchestras in the U.S. and considered among the best worldwide. Many other Ohio cities are home to their own orchestras, including the Akron Symphony Orchestra, Blue Ash Montgomery Symphony Orchestra, Canton Symphony Orchestra, Cincinnati Symphony Orchestra, Columbus Symphony Orchestra, Dayton Philharmonic Orchestra, Toledo Symphony Orchestra, and Youngstown Symphony Orchestra. Cincinnati is also home to the Cincinnati Ballet, Cincinnati Pops Orchestra, and Cincinnati Opera, all of which (including the Cincinnati Symphony Orchestra) are housed at Cincinnati Music Hall. Dayton is also home to a ballet, orchestra, and opera, collectively known as the Dayton Performing Arts Alliance.

Within the marching arts, Winter Guard International hosted its national championships in performing arts at the University of Dayton 18 times between 1983 and 2003, and has permanently since 2005. The Bluecoats Drum and Bugle Corps, based in Canton, compete in Drum Corps International's highest circuit.

=== Sports ===
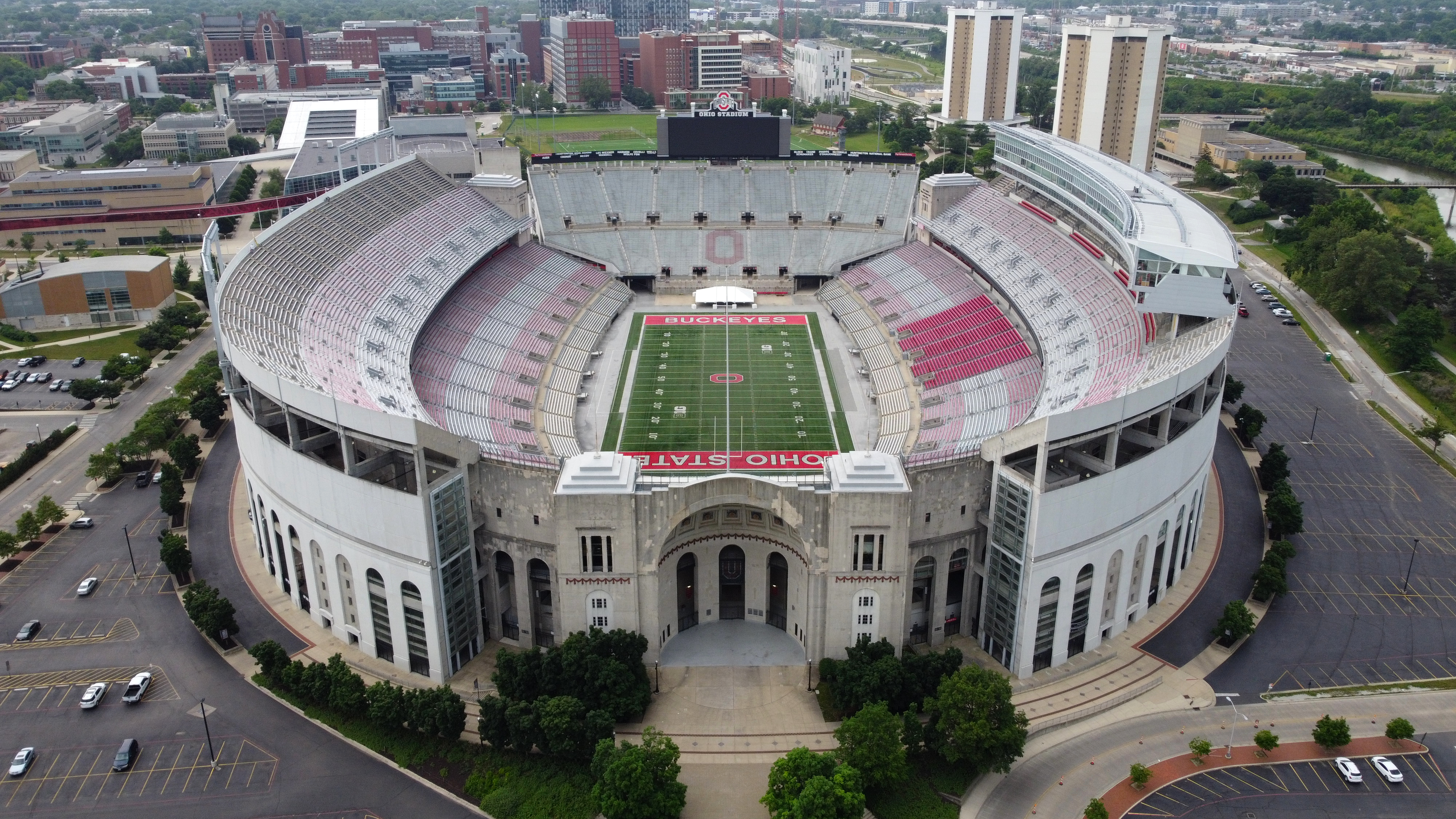
Ohio Stadium in Columbus is the fifth-largest stadium in the world.

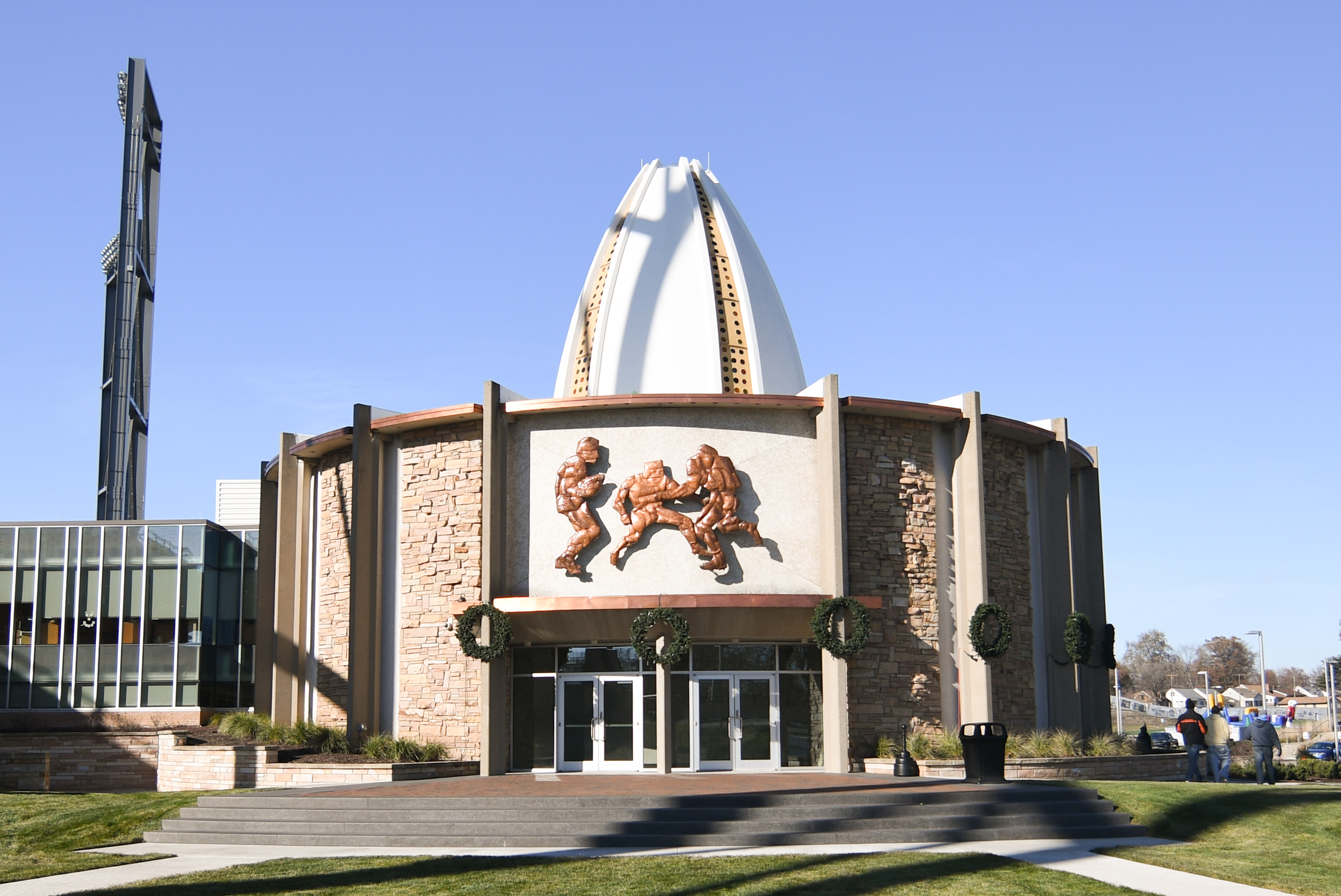
The Pro Football Hall of Fame in Canton, where the National Football League was founded in 1920.

Ohio is home to eight major professional sports teams across the five major North American leagues: the Cincinnati Reds and Cleveland Guardians in Major League Baseball, the Cincinnati Bengals and Cleveland Browns in the National Football League, the Cleveland Cavaliers in the National Basketball Association, the Columbus Blue Jackets in the National Hockey League, and the Columbus Crew and FC Cincinnati in Major League Soccer. Ohio teams have won multiple national championships, including seven World Series titles, three MLS Cups, one NBA championship, and nine NFL championships prior to the Super Bowl era. The state also hosts numerous minor league and lower-division teams. Ohio also hosts major individual sporting events, including the Memorial Tournament in golf and the Cincinnati Open in tennis, as well as prominent motorsports venues such as the Mid-Ohio Sports Car Course and Eldora Speedway.

Ohio played a central role in the development of both Major League Baseball and the National Football League. Baseball's first fully professional team, the Cincinnati Red Stockings of 1869, were organized in Ohio. An informal early-20th-century American football association, the Ohio League, was the direct predecessor of the modern NFL, although neither of Ohio's modern NFL franchises trace their roots to an Ohio League club. The NFL itself was founded in Canton, Ohio, in 1920 as the American Professional Football Conference. The first official game occurred on October 3, 1920, when the Dayton Triangles beat the Columbus Panhandles 14–0 in Dayton. Canton was enshrined as the home of the Pro Football Hall of Fame in 1963.

College athletics are also prominent in Ohio, which has eight NCAA Division I Football Bowl Subdivision programs. The Ohio State Buckeyes, competing in the Big Ten Conference, are among the most successful programs in college football history, with multiple national championships and Heisman Trophy winners. The Cincinnati Bearcats compete in the Big 12 Conference, while six teams are represented in the Mid-American Conference: the Akron Zips, Bowling Green Falcons, Kent State Golden Flashes, Miami RedHawks, Ohio Bobcats and Toledo Rockets. Other Division I institutions include the Xavier Musketeers and Youngstown State Penguins. In addition, Ohio has 12 NCAA Division II programs and 22 NCAA Division III programs.

== Government and politics ==
=== State government ===
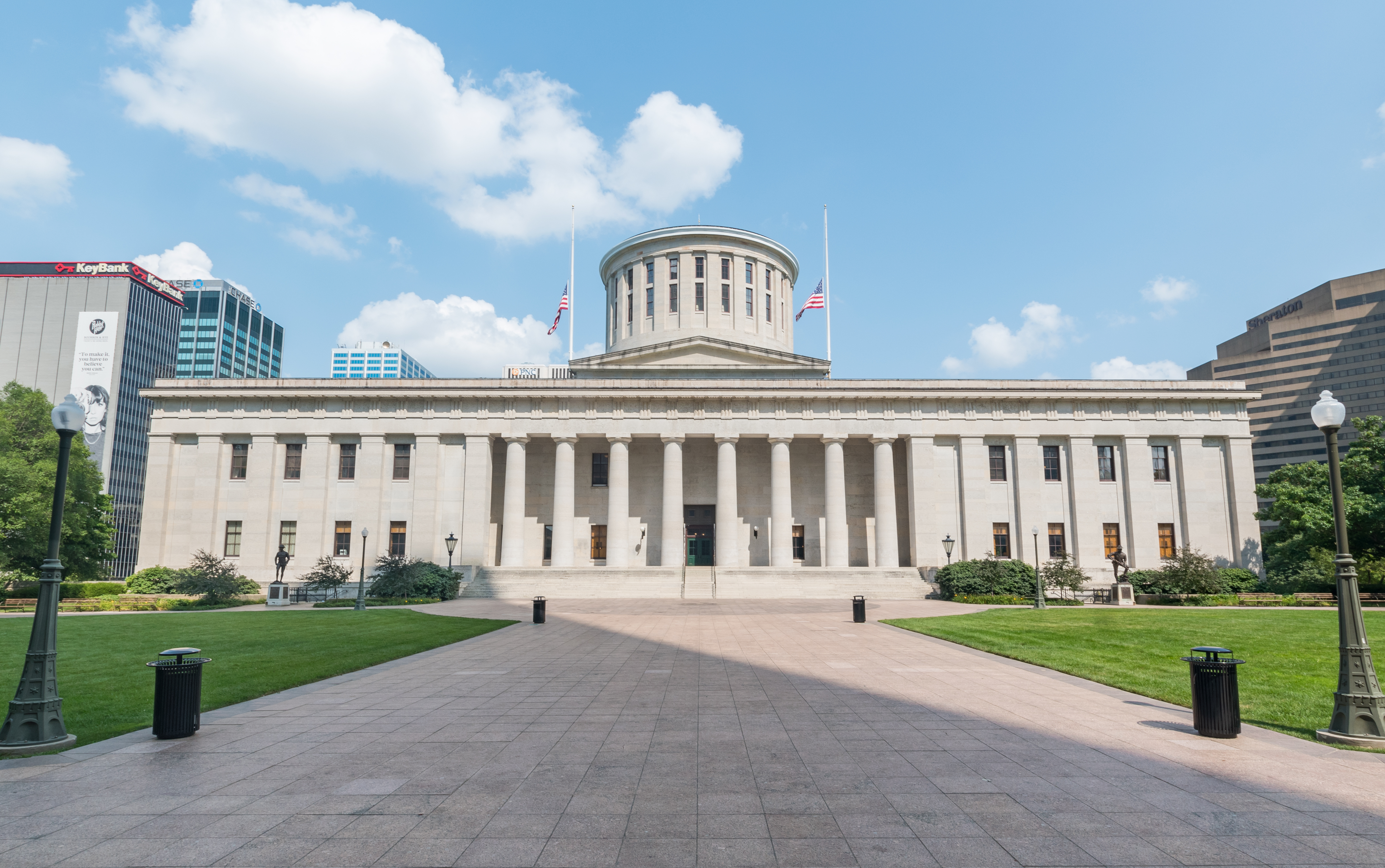
The Ohio Statehouse in Columbus is home to the Ohio General Assembly.

The state government of Ohio consists of the executive, legislative, and judicial branches. In order to be enacted into law, a bill must be adopted by both houses of the Ohio General Assembly and signed by the governor of Ohio. If the governor vetoes a bill, the General Assembly can override the veto with a three-fifths supermajority of both houses. A bill will also become a law if the governor fails to sign or veto it within 10 days of its being presented. The session laws are published in the official Law of Ohio. These in turn have been codified in the Ohio Revised Code.

The executive branch is headed by the aforementioned governor of Ohio. The current governor is Mike DeWine since 2019, a member of the Republican Party. A lieutenant governor succeeds the governor in the event of any removal from office, and performs any duties assigned by the governor. The current lieutenant governor is Jim Tressel since 2025. The other elected constitutional offices in the executive branch are the secretary of state, auditor, treasurer, and attorney general. There are 21 state administrative departments in the executive branch.

The Ohio General Assembly is a bicameral legislature consisting of the Ohio Senate and Ohio House of Representatives. The Senate is composed of 33 districts, each of which is represented by one senator. Each senator represents approximately 330,000 constituents. The House of Representatives has 99 members. The General Assembly, with the approval of the governor, draws the U.S. congressional district lines for Ohio's seats in the United States House of Representatives. The Ohio Apportionment Board draws state legislative district lines in Ohio.

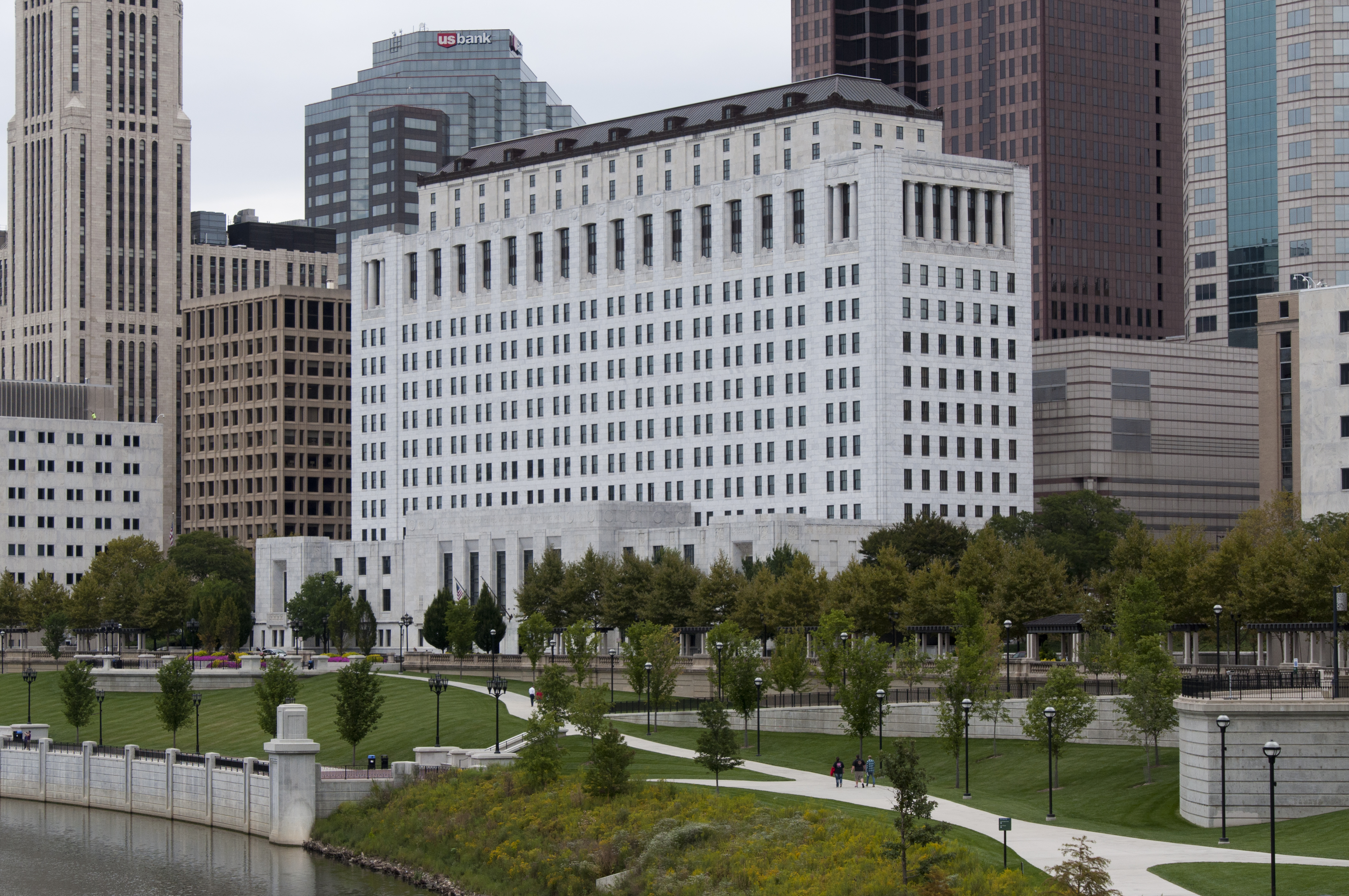
The Thomas J. Moyer Ohio Judicial Center holds the Supreme Court of Ohio.

There are three levels of the Ohio state judiciary. The lowest is the court of common pleas: each county maintains its own constitutionally mandated court of common pleas, which maintain jurisdiction over "all justiciable matters". The intermediate-level court system is the district court system. Twelve courts of appeals exist, each retaining jurisdiction over appeals from common pleas, municipal, and county courts in a set geographical area. A case heard in this system is decided by a three-judge panel, and each judge is elected. The state's highest-ranking court is the Ohio Supreme Court. A seven-justice panel composes the court, which, by its own discretion, hears appeals from the courts of appeals, and retains original jurisdiction over limited matters.

=== Local government ===
There are also several levels of local government in Ohio: counties, municipalities (cities and villages), townships, special districts, and school districts.

Ohio is divided into 88 counties. Ohio law defines a structure for county government, although they may adopt charters for home rule. Summit County and Cuyahoga County have chosen an alternate form of government. The other counties have a government with a three-member board of county commissioners, a sheriff, coroner, auditor, treasurer, clerk of the court of common pleas prosecutor, engineer, and recorder.

There are two kinds of incorporated municipalities, 251 cities and 681 villages. If a municipality has five thousand or more residents as of the last United States Census it is a city, otherwise it is a village. Municipalities have full home rule powers, may adopt a charter, ordinances and resolutions for self-government. Each municipality chooses its own form of government, but most have elected mayors and city councils or city commissions. City governments provide much more extensive services than county governments, such as police forces and paid (as opposed to volunteer) fire departments.

The entire area of the state is encompassed by townships. When the boundaries of a township are coterminous with the boundaries of a city or village, the township ceases to exist as a separate government (called a paper township). Townships are governed by a three-member board of township trustees. Townships may have limited home rule powers.

There are more than 600 city, local, and exempted village school districts providing K-12 education in Ohio, as well as about four dozen joint vocation school districts, which are separate from the K-12 districts. Each city school district, local school district, or exempted village school district is governed by an elected board of education. A school district previously under state supervision (municipal school district) may be governed by a board whose members either are elected or appointed by the mayor of the municipality containing the greatest portion of the district's area.

=== Politics ===
Party affiliation as of May 2024
Party	Registered voters	Percentage
Unaffiliated	5,734,850	71.15%
Republican	1,508,641	18.72%
Democratic	817,063	10.13%
Total	8,060,554	100%

2024 U.S. presidential election results by county in Ohio Democratic Republican

Historian R. Douglas Hurt asserts that not since Virginia "had a state made such a mark on national political affairs" as Ohio. The Economist notes that "This slice of the mid-west contains a bit of everything American—part north-eastern and part southern, part urban and part rural, part hardscrabble poverty and part booming suburb".

Ohio is considered a moderately Republican-leaning state politically. It had been a swing state in the late 20th and early 21st centuries; this status was called into question after the state voted for Republican Donald Trump at larger margins than the nation as a whole in the 2016, 2020 and 2024 presidential elections. It is also considered a bellwether state. Since 1896, Ohio has had only three misses in the general election (1944, 1960, 2020) and had the longest perfect streak of any state, voting for the winning presidential candidate in each election from 1964 to 2016 and in 34 of the 39 held since the American Civil War. No Republican has ever won the presidency without winning Ohio.

As of 2024, there are more than 8 million registered Ohioan voters, of which over 70% are not affiliated with any political party. They are disproportionate in age, with a million more over 65 than there are 18- to 24-year-olds. Since the 2010 midterm elections, Ohio's voter demographic has leaned towards the Republican Party.

The governor, Mike DeWine, is Republican, as are all other non-judicial statewide elected officials. In the Ohio State Senate the Republicans are the majority, 25–8, and in the Ohio House of Representatives the Republicans control the delegation 64–35.

Following the 2020 census, Ohio has 15 seats in the U.S. House of Representatives. As of the 2024 election cycle, ten federal representatives are Republicans while five are Democrats. Marcy Kaptur (D-09) is the most senior member of the Ohio delegation to the U.S. House of Representatives. The senior U.S. senator is Bernie Moreno and the junior is Jon Husted. Both are Republicans.

In 2023, Ohioans approved a constitutional amendment strengthening abortion rights.

=== "Mother of presidents" ===
Six U.S. presidents hailed from Ohio at the time of their elections, giving rise to its nickname "mother of presidents", a sobriquet it shares with Virginia. It is also termed "modern mother of presidents", in contrast to Virginia's status as the origin of presidents earlier in American history. Virginia-born William Henry Harrison lived much of his life in North Bend, Ohio, was elected from the state and is also buried there. The other five presidents are Rutherford B. Hayes, James A. Garfield, William McKinley, William Howard Taft and Warren G. Harding. Seven presidents were born in Ohio, making it second to Virginia's eight; in addition to the aforementioned five, Ulysses S. Grant was elected from Illinois and Benjamin Harrison was elected from Indiana.

=== Allegations of voter suppression ===
In a 2020 study, Ohio was ranked as the 17th hardest state for citizens to vote in. Since 1994, the state has had a policy of purging infrequent voters from its rolls. In April 2016, a lawsuit was filed, challenging this policy on the grounds that it violated the National Voter Registration Act (NVRA) of 1993 and the Help America Vote Act of 2002. In June, the federal district court ruled for the plaintiffs and entered a preliminary injunction applicable only to the November 2016 election. The preliminary injunction was upheld in September by the Court of Appeals for the Sixth Circuit. Had it not been upheld, thousands of voters would have been purged from the rolls just a few weeks before the election.

== Education ==
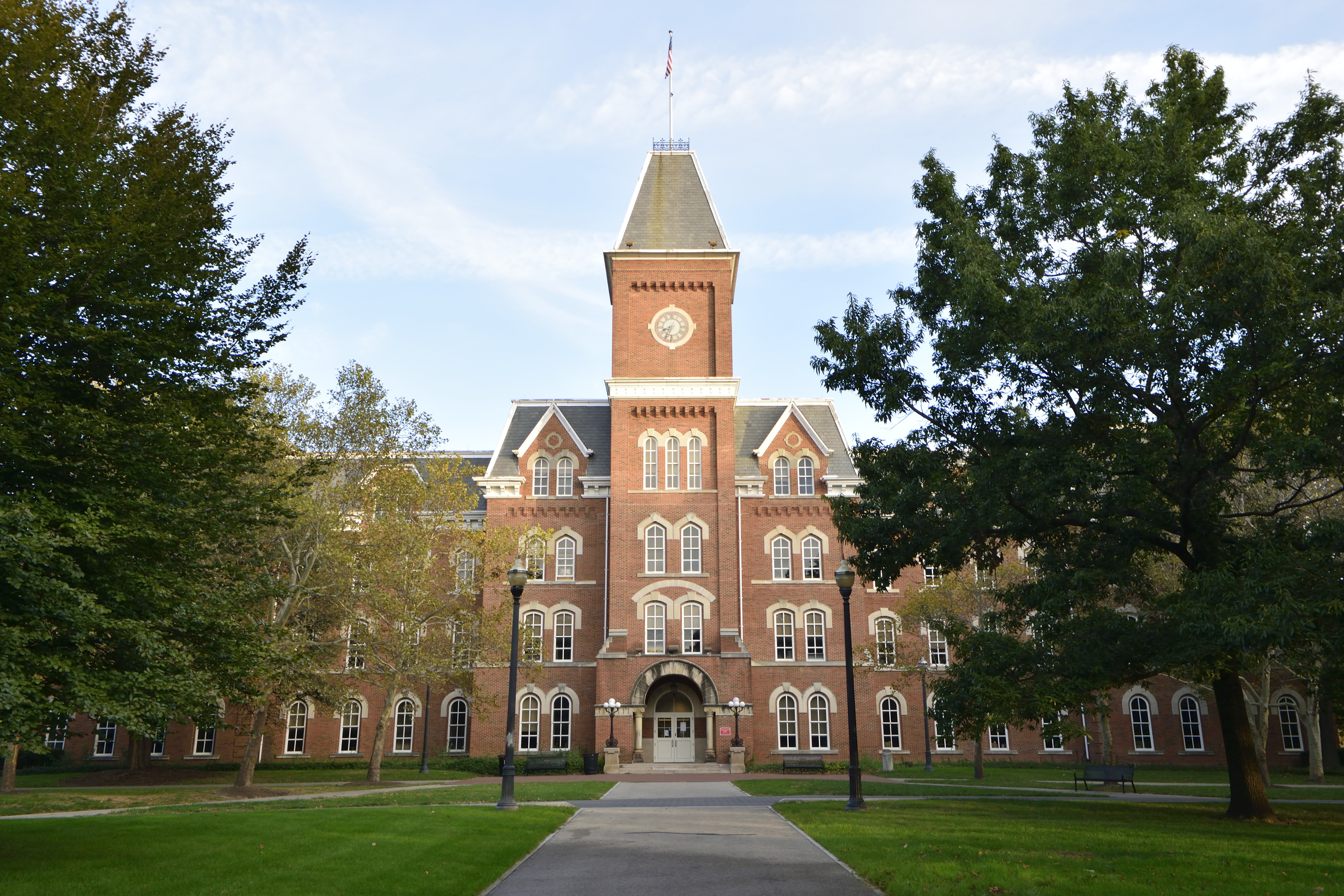
The Ohio State University in Columbus is Ohio's largest university by enrollment.

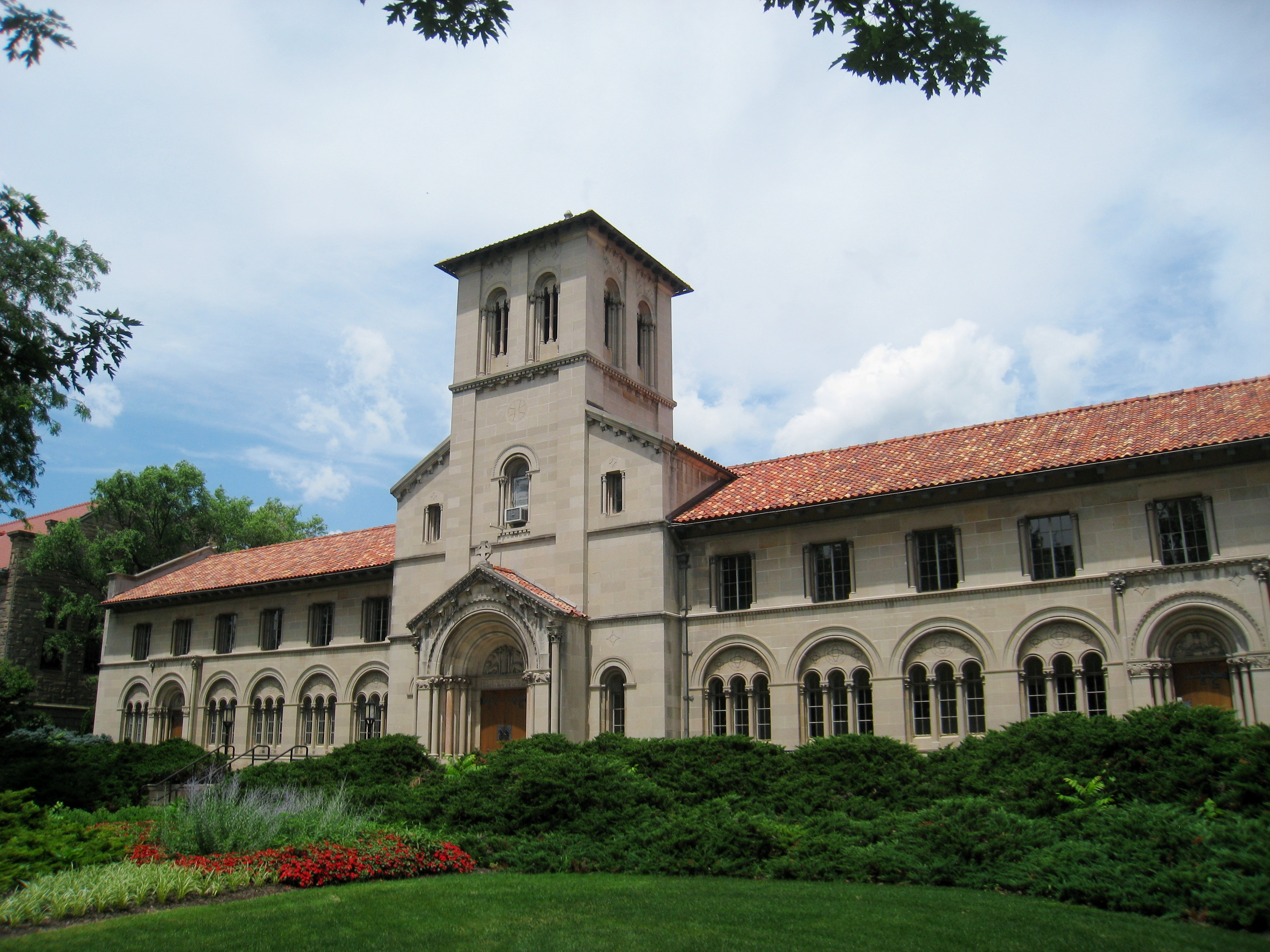
Oberlin College in northeast Ohio was the first college in the US to admit women.

Ohio's system of public education is outlined in Article VI of the state constitution, and in Title XXXIII of the Ohio Revised Code. Substantively, Ohio's system is similar to those found in other states. At the State level, the Ohio Department of Education governs primary and secondary educational institutions. At the municipal level, there are approximately 700 school districts statewide. The Ohio Board of Regents coordinates and assists with Ohio's institutions of higher education.

Ohio is home to several public and private institutions of higher learning. Prior to statehood, the Northwest Ordinance of 1787 included a provision to establish an institution of higher education in the region, resulting in the establishment of Ohio University in 1804 as Ohio's first college. The University System of Ohio includes all of Ohio's public institutions of higher education. It includes 14 four-year research universities, 24 branch and regional campuses, and 23 community colleges and technical colleges. Ohio State University is the largest of the system, with over 60,000 students at its main campus in Columbus.

Kenyon College is the state's oldest private liberal arts college, established in 1824 by an Episcopal bishop to train clergy on the Ohio frontier. Oberlin College, established in 1833, was among the earliest colleges in the US to admit African Americans in 1835, and became the first to admit women in 1837.

The Carnegie Foundation classifies seven of the state's institutions as tier 1 research universities: Case Western Reserve University, University of Cincinnati, University of Dayton, Kent State University, Ohio State University, Ohio University, and University of Toledo.

=== Libraries ===
Ohio is home to some of the nation's highest-ranked public libraries. Major metropolitan public library systems include the Cleveland Public Library, the Cuyahoga County Public Library, the Cincinnati and Hamilton County Public Library, and the Columbus Metropolitan Library. The Ohio Public Library Information Network provides Ohio residents with internet access to their 251 public libraries. It also provides Ohioans with free home access to high-quality, subscription research databases.

The OhioLINK library consortium provides Ohio's college and university libraries with mutual access to their collections. The program allows researchers access to books and other media that might not be otherwise available. CLEVNET, another major library consortium, is based at the Cleveland Public Library and includes 47 public library systems in Northeast Ohio.

== Transportation ==
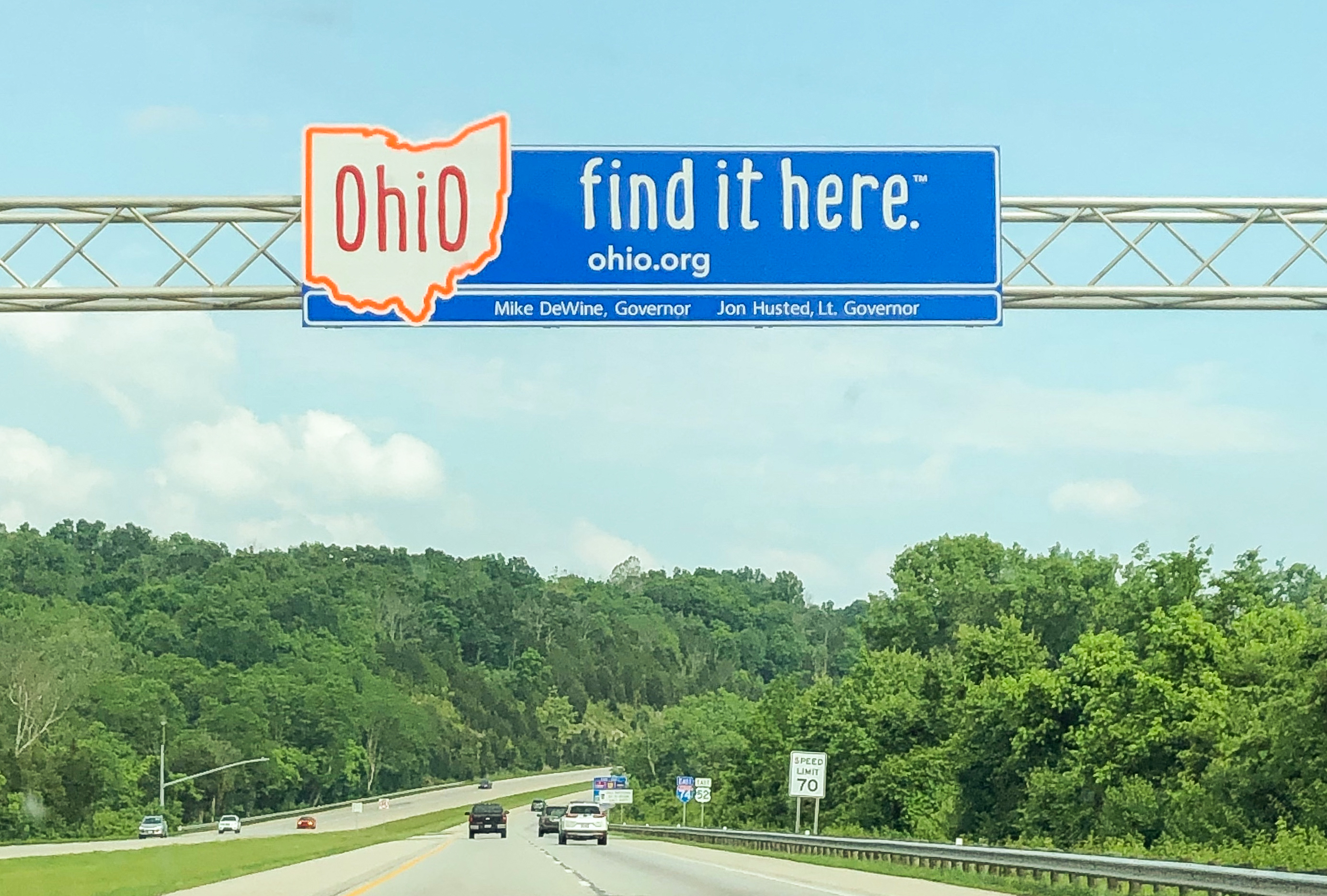
Ohio welcome sign along Interstate 74 in 2019

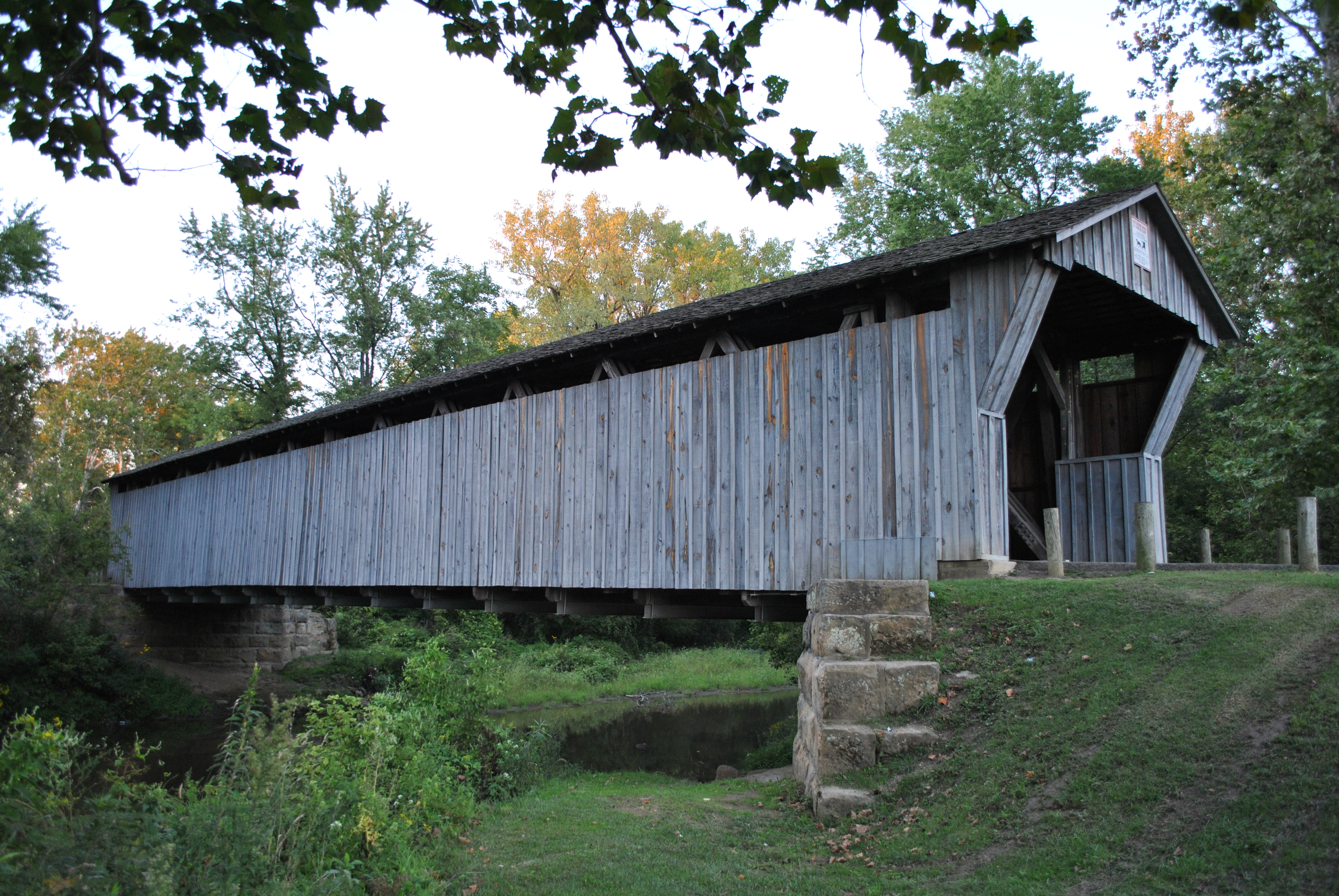
Covered bridges, like the Bergstresser/Dietz Covered Bridge, are common throughout rural Ohio.

=== Roads ===
Many major east–west transportation corridors go through Ohio. One of those pioneer routes, known in the early 20th century as "Main Market Route 3", was chosen in 1913 to become part of the historic Lincoln Highway which was the first road across America, connecting New York City to San Francisco. In Ohio, the Lincoln Highway linked many towns and cities together, including Canton, Mansfield, Wooster, Lima, and Van Wert. The Lincoln Highway's arrival in Ohio was a major influence on the state's development. Upon the advent of the federal numbered highway system in 1926, the Lincoln Highway through Ohio became U.S. Route 30.

Ohio is home to 228 miles (367 km) of the National Road, now U.S. Route 40.

Ohio has a highly developed network of roads and interstate highways. Major east-west through routes include the Ohio Turnpike (I-80/I-90) in the north, I-76 through Akron to Pennsylvania, I-70 through Columbus and Dayton, and the Appalachian Highway (State Route 32) running from West Virginia to Cincinnati. Major north–south routes include I-75 in the west through Toledo, Dayton, and Cincinnati, I-71 through the middle of the state from Cleveland through Columbus and Cincinnati into Kentucky, and I-77 in the eastern part of the state from Cleveland through Akron, Canton, New Philadelphia and Marietta south into West Virginia. Interstate 75 between Cincinnati and Dayton is one of Ohio's most heavily traveled sections of interstate.

=== Trails ===
Ohio has a highly developed network of signed state bicycle routes. Many of them follow rail trails, with conversion ongoing. The Ohio to Erie Trail (route 1) connects Cincinnati, Columbus, and Cleveland. U.S. Bicycle Route 50 traverses Ohio from Steubenville to the Indiana state line outside Richmond.

Ohio has several long-distance hiking trails, the most prominent of which is the Buckeye Trail, which extends 1,444 mi (2,324 km) in a loop around the state. Part of it is on roads and part on wooded trail. Additionally, the North Country Trail (the longest of the 11 National Scenic Trails authorized by Congress) and the American Discovery Trail (a system of recreational trails and roads that collectively form a coast-to-coast route across the mid-tier of the United States) pass through Ohio. Much of these two trails coincide with the Buckeye Trail.

=== Rail ===
Ohio has an extensive rail network, though today most lines carry only freight traffic. Three Class I freight railroads operate in Ohio: CSX Transportation, Norfolk Southern Railway, and Canadian National Railway. Many local freight carriers also exist in the state.

Amtrak, the national passenger railroad, operates three long-distance rail routes through Ohio. The Lake Shore Limited serves Cleveland, Elyria, Toledo, Sandusky, and Bryan. The Capitol Limited stops in those cities as well as in Alliance. The Cardinal serves Cincinnati Union Terminal. From Ohio, passengers can ride directly to Chicago, New York, Boston, Washington, D.C., Indianapolis, Pittsburgh, Buffalo, and dozens of destinations in-between.

Columbus is the largest city in the U.S. with no passenger rail. Its Union Station was last served in 1979 by the National Limited.

Ohio is home to several scenic railways and museums, including the Cuyahoga Valley Scenic Railroad through Cuyahoga Valley National Park, the Age of Steam Roundhouse museum, and the Hocking Valley Scenic Railway near Hocking Hills State Park.

=== Transit ===
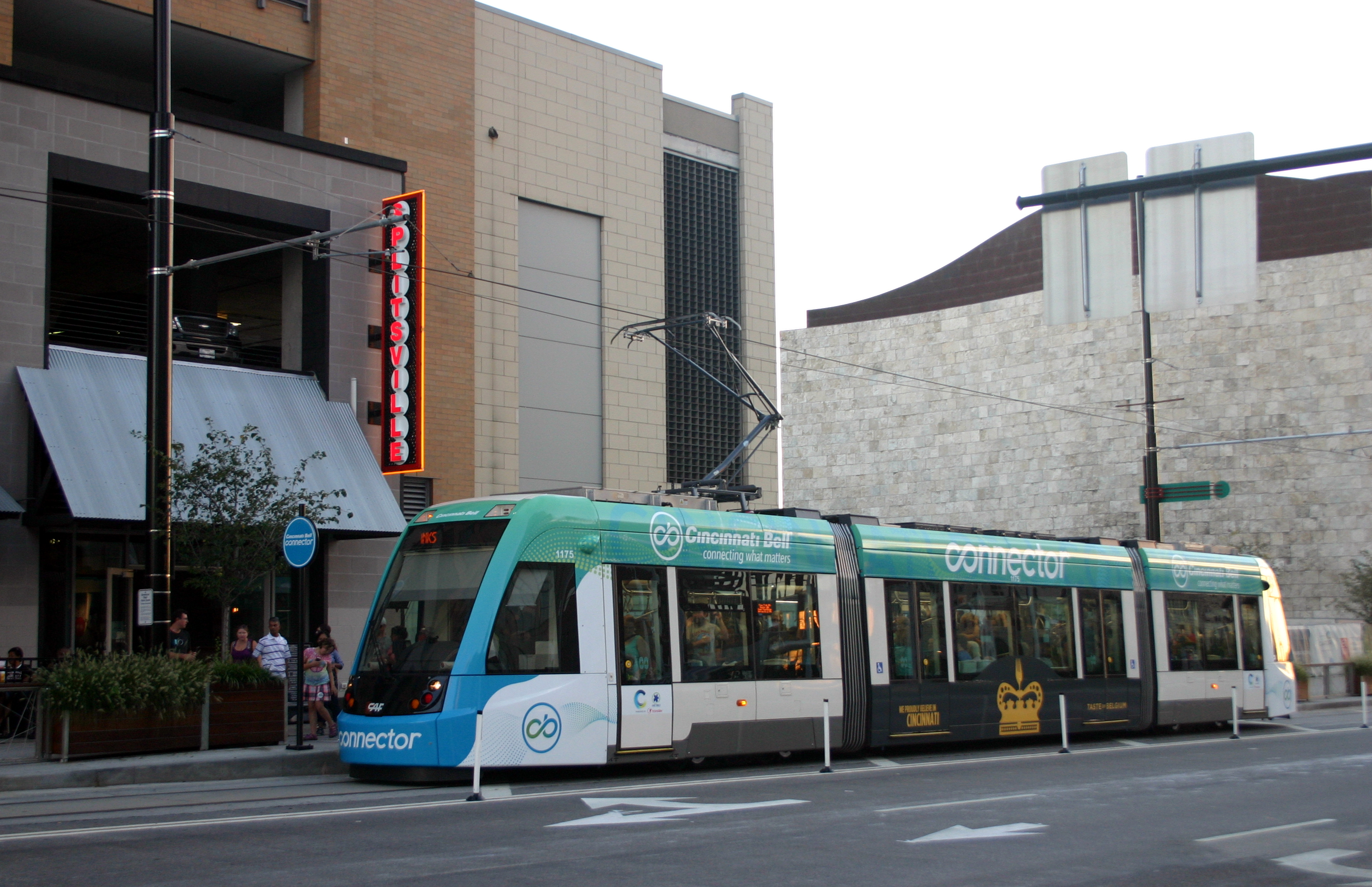
Cincinnati Connector streetcar

Mass transit exists in many forms in Ohio cities, primarily through bus systems. The Greater Cleveland Regional Transit Authority (GCRTA) operates the RTA Rapid Transit system, which consists of one heavy rail line, three light rail lines, and three bus rapid transit lines. Cincinnati is served by the Southwest Ohio Regional Transit Authority (SORTA) bus network as well as a 3.6-mile (5.8 km) streetcar line, the Cincinnati Bell Connector. Other major transit agencies in Ohio include the Central Ohio Transit Authority (COTA) serving Columbus and the Greater Dayton Regional Transit Authority (GDRTA) serving Dayton.

=== Air travel ===
Ohio has four international airports, four commercial, and two military. The four international include Cleveland Hopkins International Airport, John Glenn Columbus International Airport, Dayton International Airport, and Rickenbacker International Airport (one of two military airfields). The other military airfield is Wright Patterson Air Force Base which is one of the largest Air Force bases in the United States. Other major airports are in Toledo and Akron. Cincinnati's main airport, Cincinnati/Northern Kentucky International Airport, is in Hebron, Kentucky, and therefore is not included in Ohio airport lists.

== See also ==
- Index of Ohio-related articles
- Outline of Ohio

== Bibliography ==
- Profiles of Ohio: history, statistics, demographics for all 1,339 populated places in Ohio, with detailed state and government histories, plus comparative statistics & rankings. (6th ed. Grey House Publishing, 2021). 828pp ISBN 1-64265-827-8; covers 88 counties, 248 cities and 689 villages.
- Cayton, Andrew R. L. (2002). Ohio: The History of a People. Columbus, OH: The Ohio State University Press. ISBN 0-8142-0899-1
- Kern, Kevin F., and Gregory S. Wilson. (2013) Ohio: A History of the Buckeye State (Wiley-Blackwell, 2013), 544pp
- Knepper, George W. (1989). Ohio and Its People. Kent, OH: Kent State University Press. ISBN 978-0-87338-791-0
- Holli, Melvin G. (1999). The American Mayor. State College, PA: Pennsylvania State University Press. ISBN 0-271-01876-3
- Roseboom, Eugene H.; Weisenburger, Francis P. (1967). A History of Ohio. Columbus: The Ohio Historical Society.
- Putnam, Melanie K; Schaefgen, Susan M (1997). Ohio Legal Research Guide. William S Hein & Co. ISBN 978-1-57588-087-7.
- Schmidlin, Thomas; Schmidlin, Jeanne Appelhans (1996). Thunder in the Heartland: A Chronicle of Outstanding Weather Events in Ohio. The Kent State university Press. Kent, Ohio. ISBN 978-0-87338-549-7.
