= Flag of Ohio =

U.S. state flag

State of Ohio
- The Ohio Burgee
- Use: Civil and state flag
- Proportion: 8:13
- Adopted: May 9, 1902; 124 years ago
- Design: A guidon constituting five horizontal stripes alternating between red and white. A blue triangle based at the hoist contains a white and red "O" and 17 white stars.
- Designed by: John Eisenmann

The flag of Ohio, also known as the Ohio Burgee, is a red, white, and blue U.S. state flag with a distinctive triangular swallowtail shape. The flag's elements symbolize the state's natural features and order of admission into the Union. A prominent disc at the flag's hoist suggests the letter O, the first letter in Ohio's name.

For nearly a century after statehood, Ohio did not have a legally authorized state flag. John Eisenmann designed Ohio's flag in 1901 for the Pan-American Exposition and the flag was officially adopted the next year.

Ohio has adopted an official salute to its flag as well as an official folding procedure. The Ohio flag has influenced a number of logos and municipal flags within the state. A scarlet-colored gubernatorial flag is based on the state seal.

== Statute ==
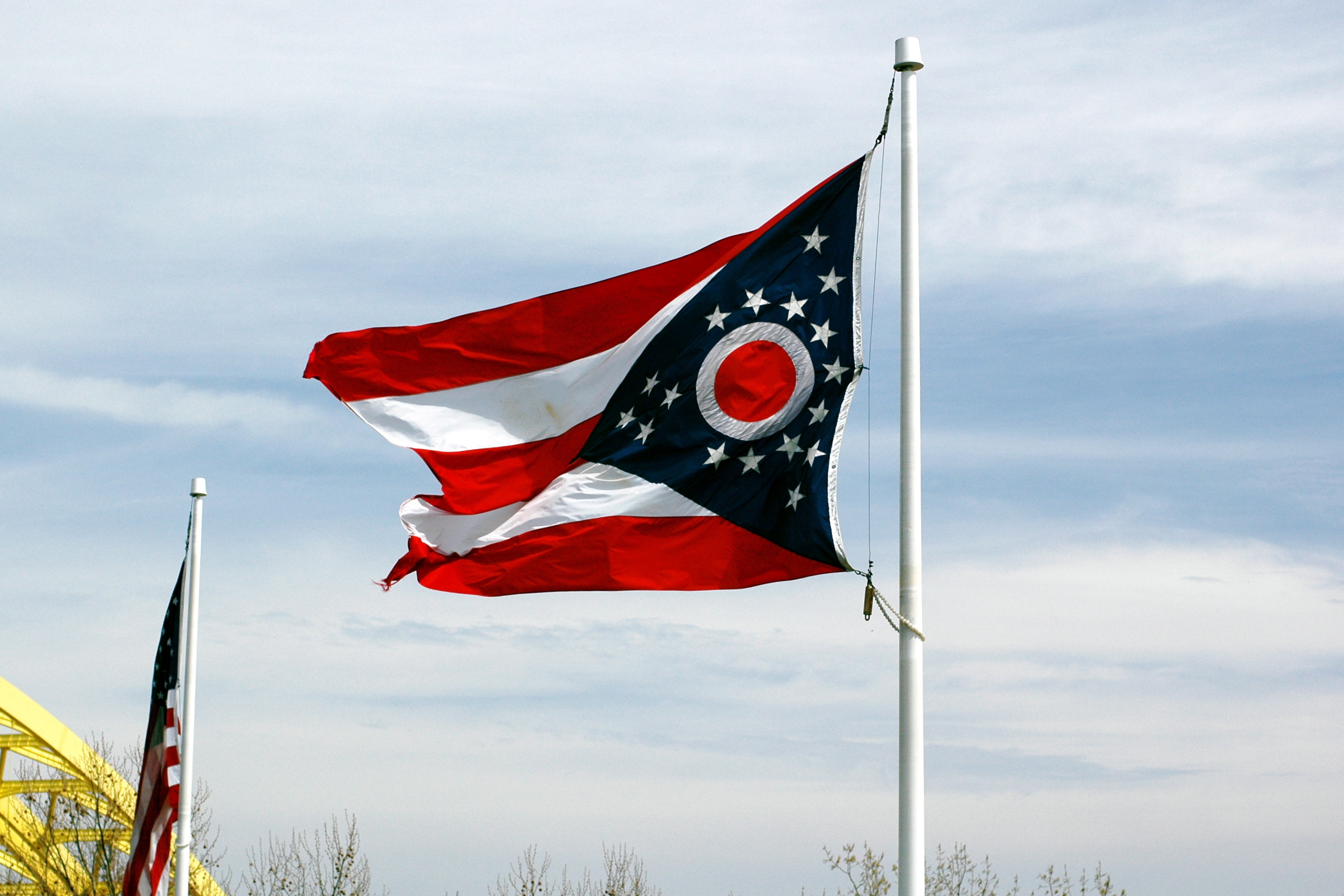
An Ohio flag flies above Sawyer Point in Cincinnati.

The Ohio state flag's design is defined in the Ohio Revised Code, Chapter 5, § 5.01, as:

The flag of the state shall be burgee-shaped. It shall have three red and two white horizontal stripes...The union of the flag shall be seventeen five-pointed stars, white in a blue triangular field...the base of which shall be the staff end or vertical edge of the flag, and the apex of which shall be the center of the middle red stripe. The stars shall be grouped around a red disc superimposed upon a white circular "O."...The proportional dimensions of the flag and of its various parts shall be according to the official design on file in the office of the secretary of state.

== Design and symbolism ==
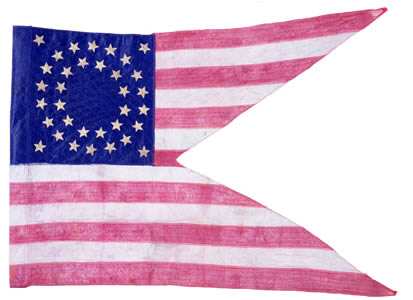
A typical 34-star Union guidon, carried by many Ohio cavalry units during the Civil War.

The law defining the flag's design (OH Rev Code § 5.01) also defines its symbolism. The three red and two white horizontal stripes are stated to represent "the roads and waterways of the state," the blue triangular field represents "the state's hills and valleys," the thirteen stars grouped around the "O" represent "the original states of the United States," the four stars added to the peak of the triangle symbolize "that Ohio was the seventeenth state admitted to the union," and the "O" represents the letter O in "Ohio" and "suggests the state's nickname, the buckeye state."

In addition to resembling the letter O and a buckeye nut, the flag's annulus also represents "the original territory of Ohio" in the Northwest Territory.

Ohio's flag is the only non-rectangular U.S. state flag. It is a rare example of a non-quadrilateral civil flag. According to vexillologist Whitney Smith, it may be loosely based upon cavalry flags of the Civil War and Spanish–American War. The flag has been officially defined as a "burgee" since 2002, even though burgees are typically used as maritime flags. Its shape, lack of text, and mirror symmetry allow it to be flown or hung in various orientations without affecting legibility. On account of the flag's uncommon shape, foreign manufacturers have occasionally set the entire design against a white, rectangular field.

== History ==
=== Pre-official flags (before 1902) ===
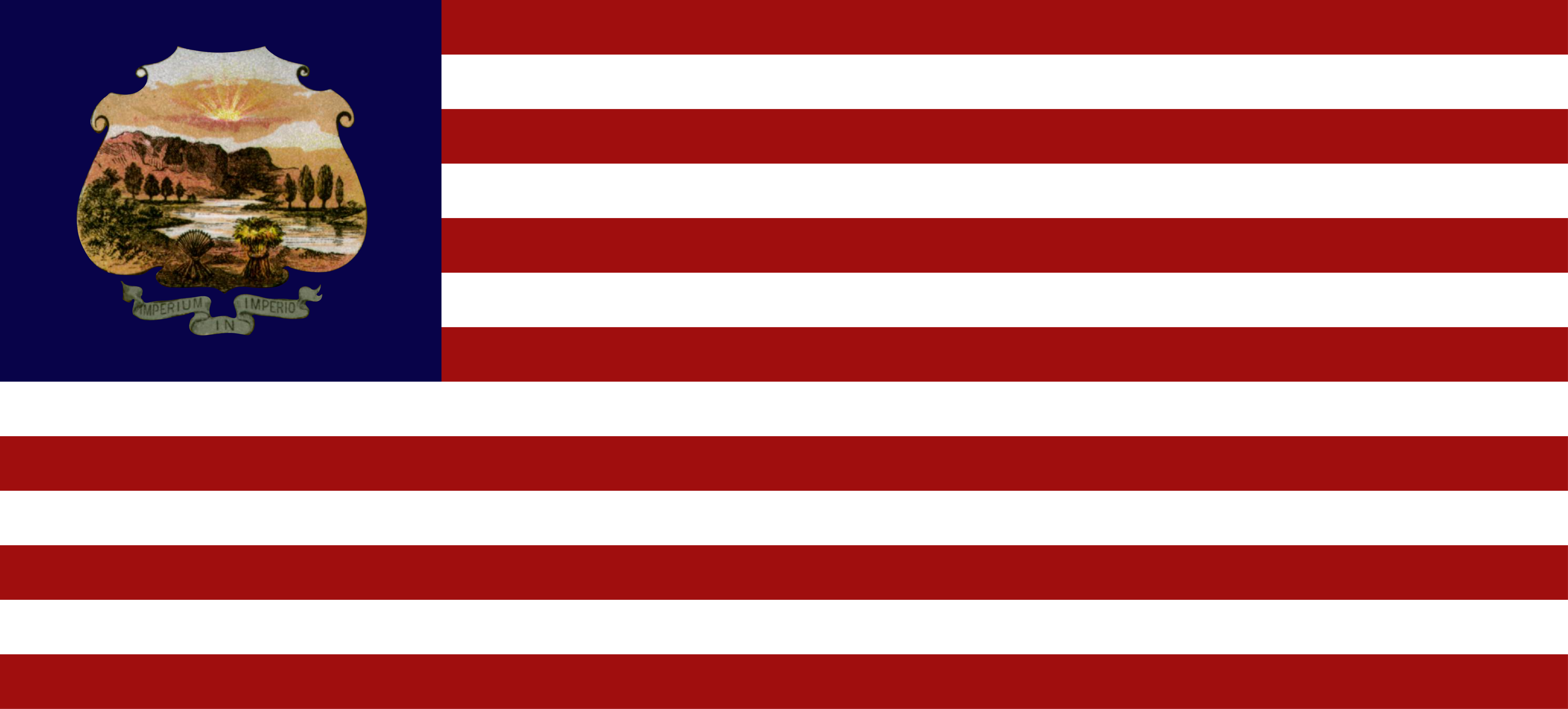
A digital recreation of Mr. Safford's proposed flag, 1859

For nearly a century after statehood, Ohio did not have a legally authorized state flag. The state militia carried regimental colors based on the Stars and Stripes, with the addition of "a large eagle, with the number of the regiment and the prescribed number of stars above".

In May of 1846, a year after Jackson Hall in Washington, D.C. was finished, the owner wanted to procure flags from each of the states to be displayed on July 4th.

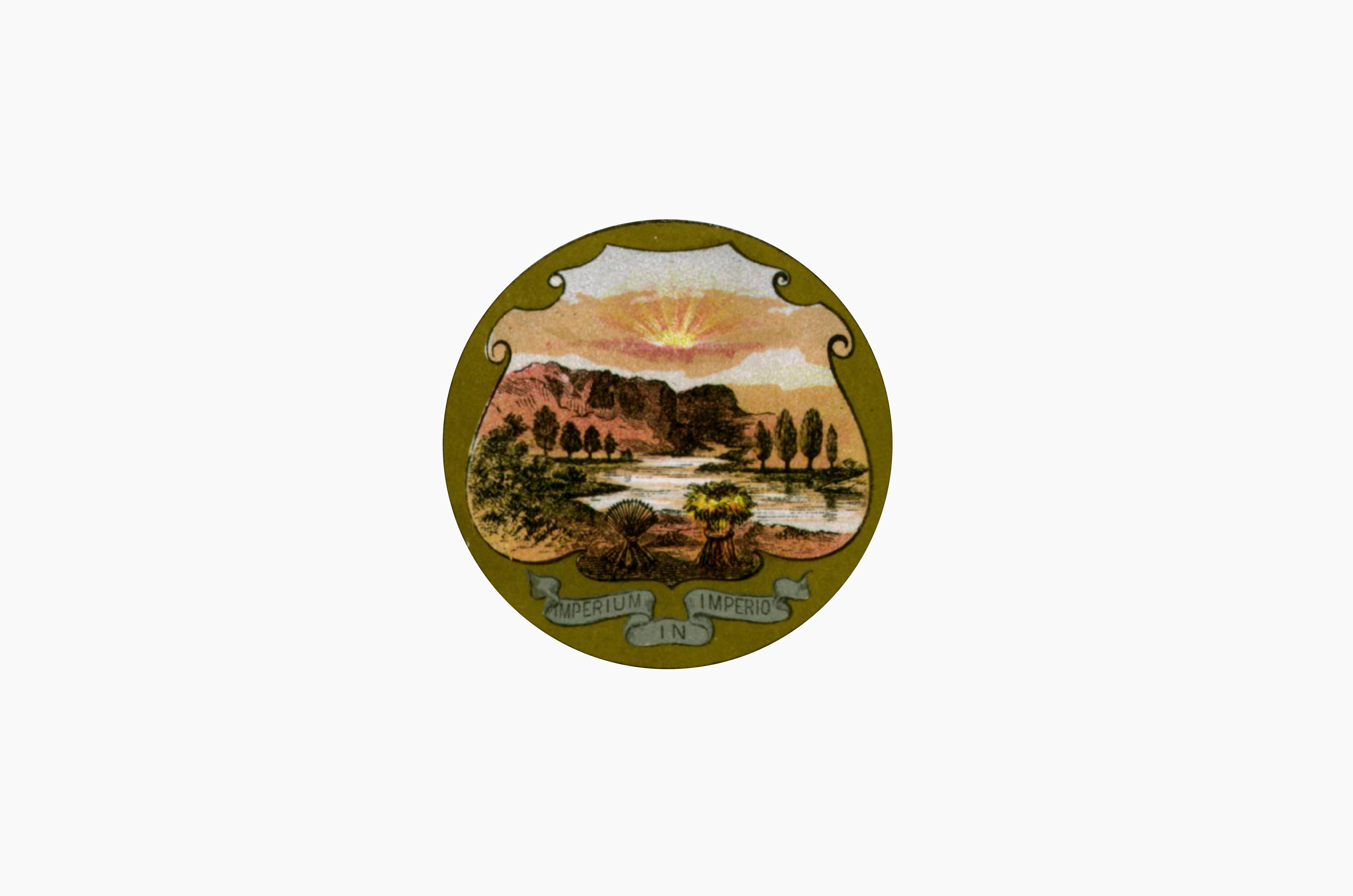
A digital recreation of the Arsenal flag, 1860

By the early 1850s, Ohio expressed interest in adopting a state flag, as several other states had already done. In 1859, Mr. Safford came up with a bill in the state senate for funds to purchased two flags. One was to be displayed over the state house, the other in the senate chamber. The flags were similar to the national flag but with the state's coat of arms on its field. In March the bill passed. The next day, the House added a bill removing the coat of arms from the flag. Continuing disagreements between legislators on its design prevented them from raising funds for the production of these flags.

In late 1860, Quartermaster General David L. Wood and Adjutant General Henry B. Carrington devised a flag consisting of the state seal upon a white field and measured 10 x 12 feet. They had it flown above the Ohio State Arsenal in Columbus, in hopes that it might someday become the state flag. On January 17, 1861, at a banquet organized by the Columbus Typographical Union Local #5, future U.S. President James A. Garfield gave a speech defending the national flag as the only flag Ohio's soldiers would march to battle under. The generals, in attendance, were moved to set aside their proposal and hoist the Stars and Stripes in its place. Later that year, Wood and Carrington joined fellow Ohioans in battle under the 34-star Union flag, which would serve as the inspiration for a state banner decades later.

In June of 1864, state delegates carried a unique flag when they went to the 1864 National Union National Convention. It had a white field with a red, white, and blue border. In the center of the field were the words "Ohio true to the Union."

=== Current flag (1902–present) ===
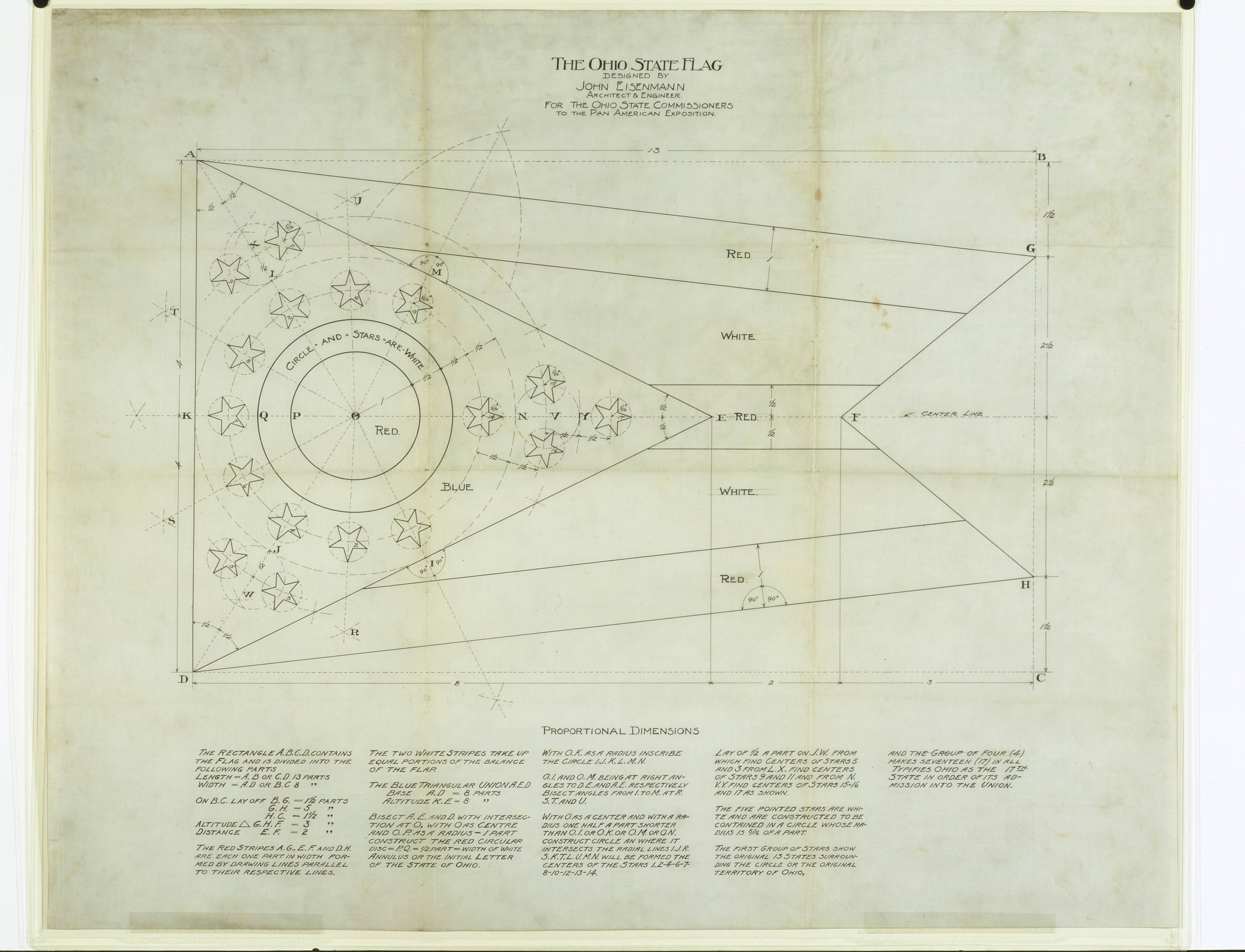
Eisenmann's original specification

In 1901, Cleveland architect John Eisenmann was commissioned to design an exhibition hall for his state at the Pan-American Exposition in Buffalo, New York. He developed a distinctive flag to fly over each corner of the Ohio Building. The wool flags officially represented the Ohio Pan-American Exposition Commission rather than the state. On July 18, Governor George K. Nash visited the exposition, where he was presented with one of the flags, which is now held in the Ohio History Connection collections. Eisenmann secured a U.S. design patent for his design, which he described as "a triangular forked or swallow-tailed flag corresponding to the shape generally known as a 'cavalry-guidon' or 'broad pennant.'"

In 1902, State Representative William S. McKinnon, a member of the Ohio Pan-American Exposition Commission, introduced House Bill 213 designating Eisenmann's design as the official flag. It became law on May 9, making it the 20th U.S. state flag or banner. (Eisenmann had assigned his patent, which had a term of three and a half years, to the State of Ohio on April 24.)

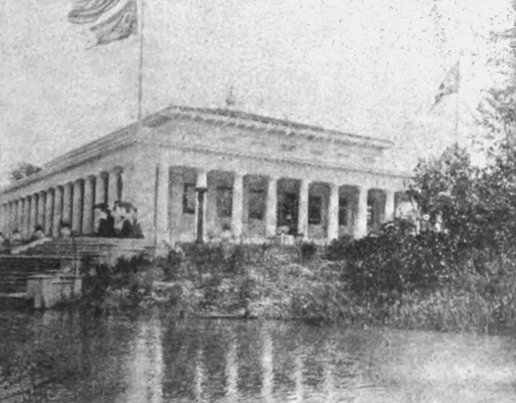
The Ohio Building at the 1901 Pan-American Exposition

Because Eisenmann's design deviated from the "seal on a bedsheet" design then nearly universal among state flags, the press looked overseas for precedents: the layout was likened to either the flag of Cuba or of the Philippines, while the red and white annulus was derided for its similarity to the sun on the Japanese flag.

Initially, Ohio's flag was seldom used, in part due to the prevailing opinion that the Stars and Stripes should hold a monopoly on patriotic displays. Similar sentiment hindered the adoption of municipal flags in Cleveland and Cincinnati, to the extent that both were downplayed as mere "banners" for promotional purposes. In 1903, it was reported that, among state politicians, only Nash displayed the guidon.

In the century following its adoption, the guidon gained significant popularity, being flown not only by the state but frequently also by its residents and businesses.

== Usage ==
=== Salute ===
In 2002, the Ohio General Assembly commemorated the 100th anniversary of the state flag's adoption by adopting a salute to the flag, to be recited after the Pledge of Allegiance:

I salute the flag of the state of Ohio and pledge to the Buckeye State respect and loyalty.

— Ohio Rev. Code §5.013. "Pledge to the state flag".

=== Folding the flag ===
The flag of Ohio is officially folded in 17 steps.

A method of folding the flag of Ohio was created by Alex Weinstock, a Boy Scout from Junction City, for his Eagle Scout service project. It requires two people. The procedure was passed by the 125th Ohio General Assembly as House Bill 552 and signed into law by Governor Bob Taft on February 15, 2005:

The general assembly hereby establishes a recommended procedure for the folding of the state flag by two people. The procedure is as follows:

With the flag unfolded, fold the flag in half lengthwise so that the points of the flag are aligned. Fold the flag in half lengthwise a second time to form a long strip with the red disc facing the ground. Next, fold the pointed end back onto itself to form a rectangle. These steps entail three folds.

Starting on the end formed by the fold of the pointed end back onto itself, fold two inches of the flag onto itself for a flag with a three-foot hoist and a five-foot fly, or another appropriate width of fold for a flag of a different size. Repeat the folds a total of fourteen times, alternating the folds in a fan-like manner.

The result is a total of seventeen folds symbolizing that Ohio was the seventeenth state admitted to the Union. Finally, neatly and snugly wrap the remaining length of flag around the fan-folds to form a compact rectangle.

— Ohio Rev. Code §5.014. "Procedure for folding state flag".

Ohio is not the only state that has designated a folding procedure for its flag; however, Ohio's procedure takes on special importance due to the flag's irregular shape. A flag vendor in Arkansas has described the procedure as "quite a challenge".

=== Derivations ===
Ohio's flag is regularly flown during football games by Ohio State University Marching Band's "JI-Row" as the percussion section's row mascot. The Columbus Blue Jackets logo and Cincinnati Bengals fan flag are both based on the state flag.

A number of municipalities and counties in Ohio have adopted pennants and swallowtails based on the state burgee. Adams County and the cities of Marysville and Mentor have flags that essentially replace the annulus with a seal and modify the pattern of stars in the triangular union. Additionally, the city of Green uses a burgee for the city flag, altering the colors to green and white stripes, as opposed to the original red and white on the Ohio state flag.

== Gallery ==
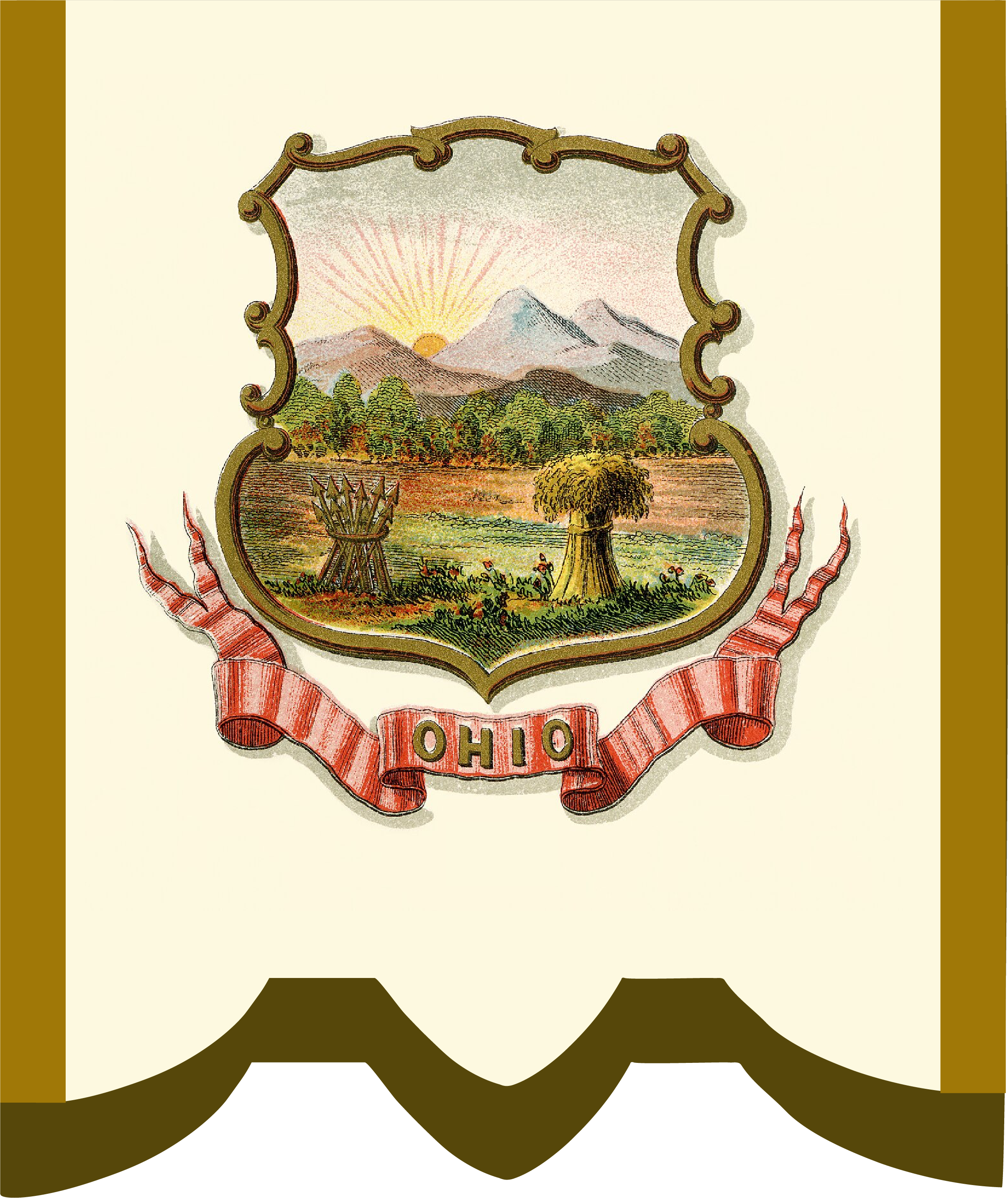
Unofficial state banner used by state delegates at the 1872 Republican National Convention

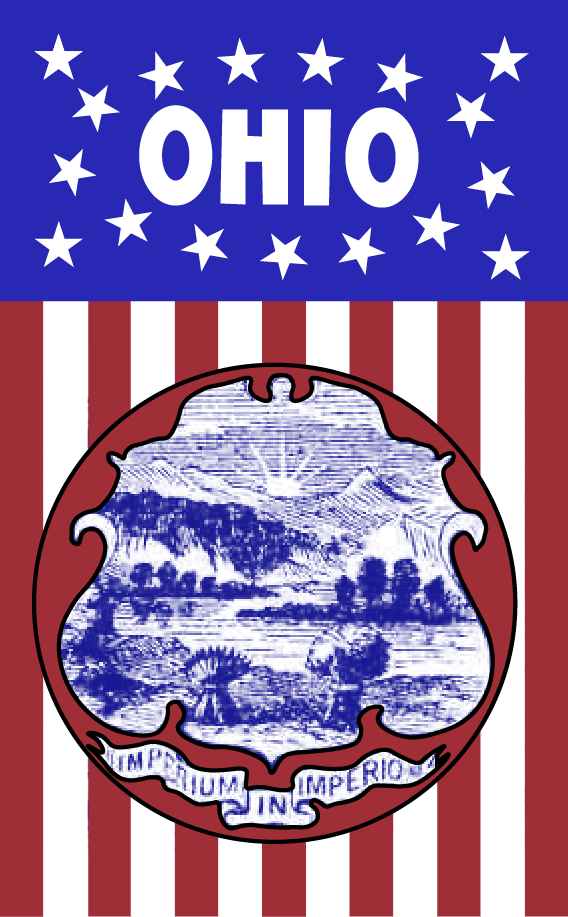
Unofficial state banner c. 1880–1910

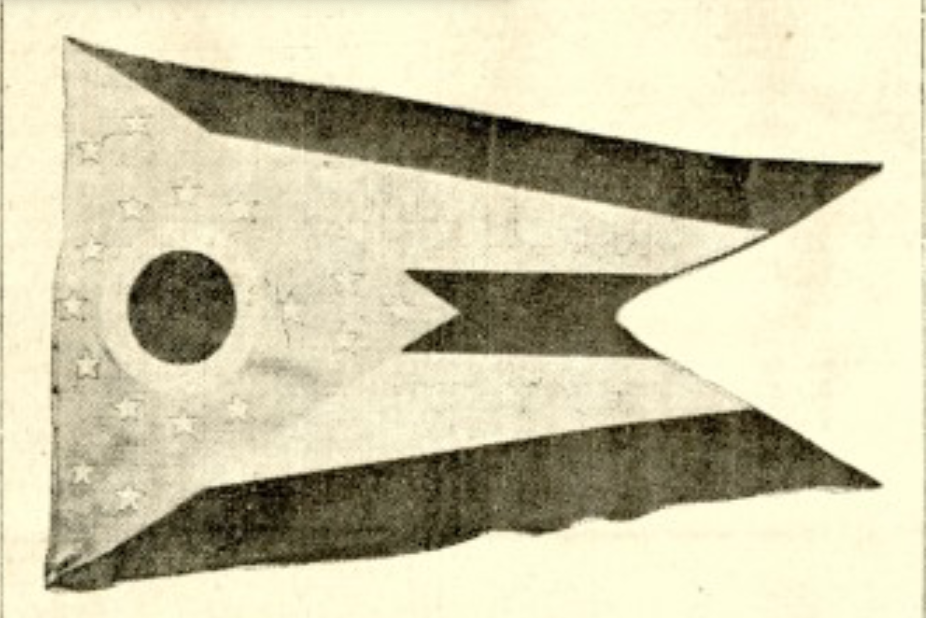
State flag from 1911

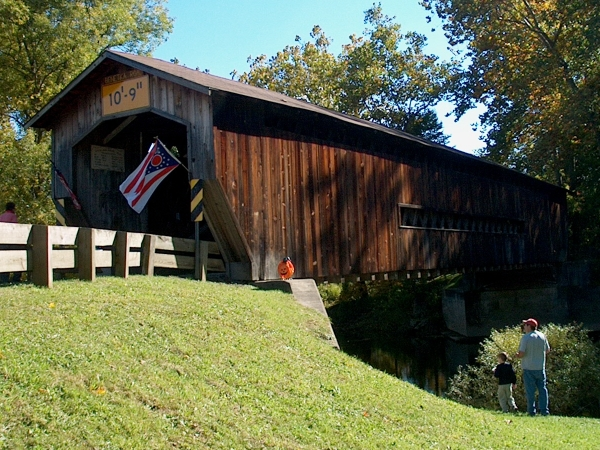
A rectangular Ohio flag flies in front of the Benetka Road Covered Bridge in Ashtabula County.

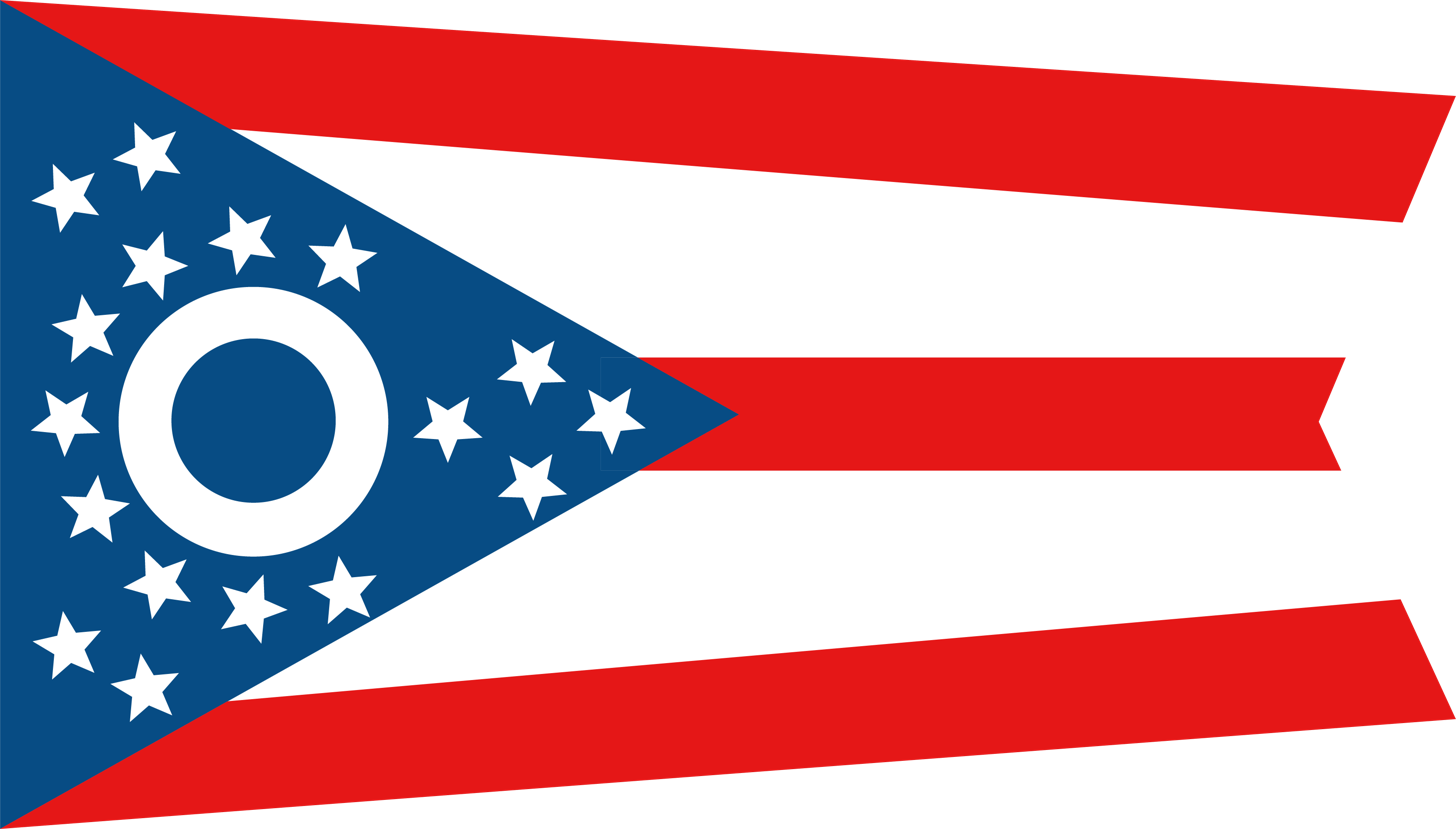
Digital remake of a misprinted guidon with a blue disc c. 1902–1915

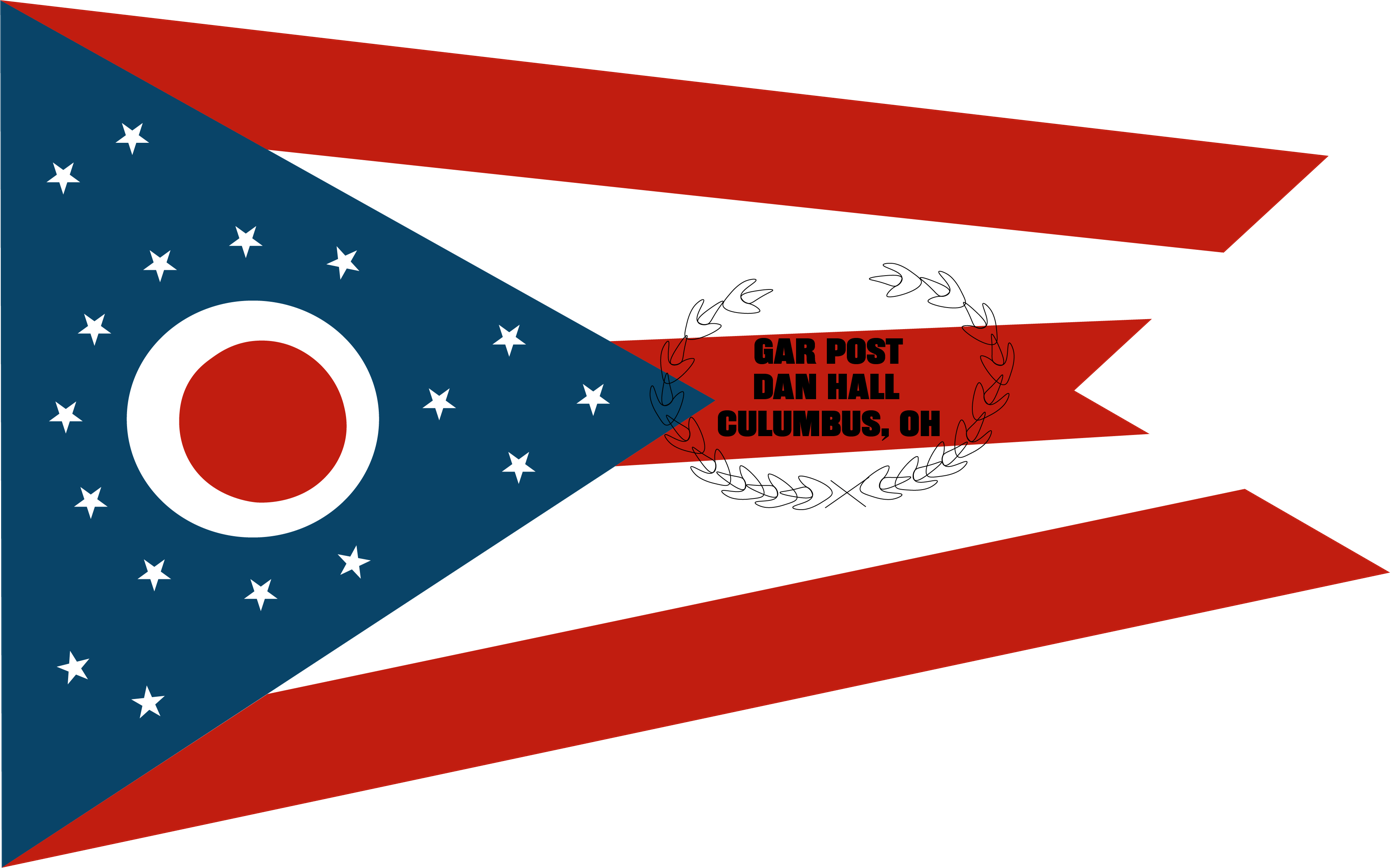
State flag used by Grand Army of the Republic, 1925

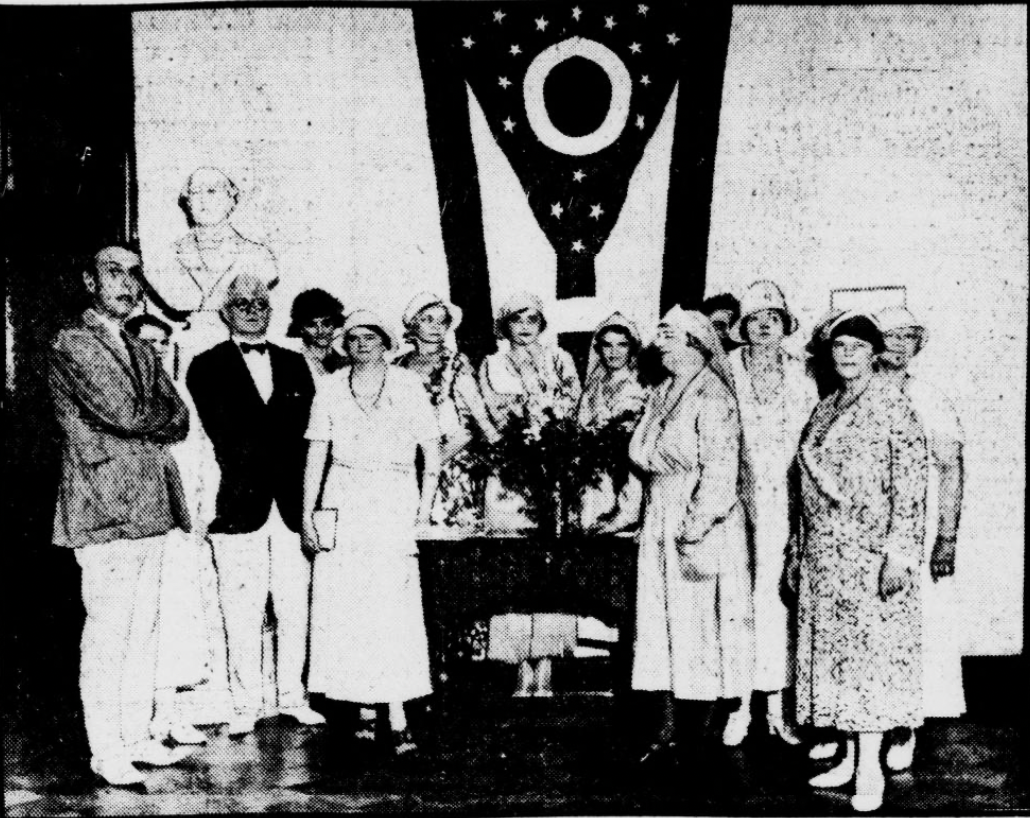
State flag from 1932

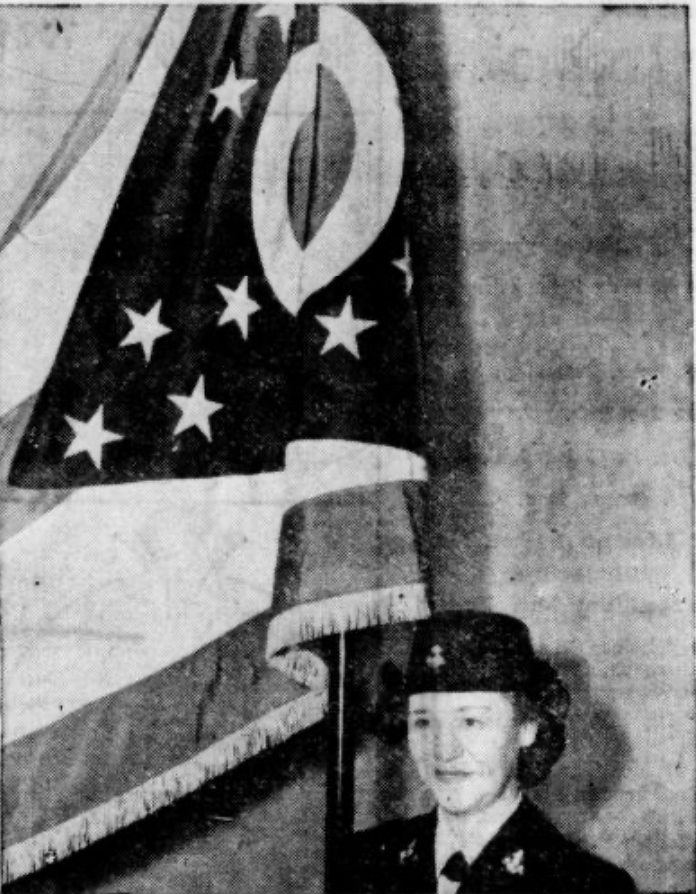
State flag from 1953

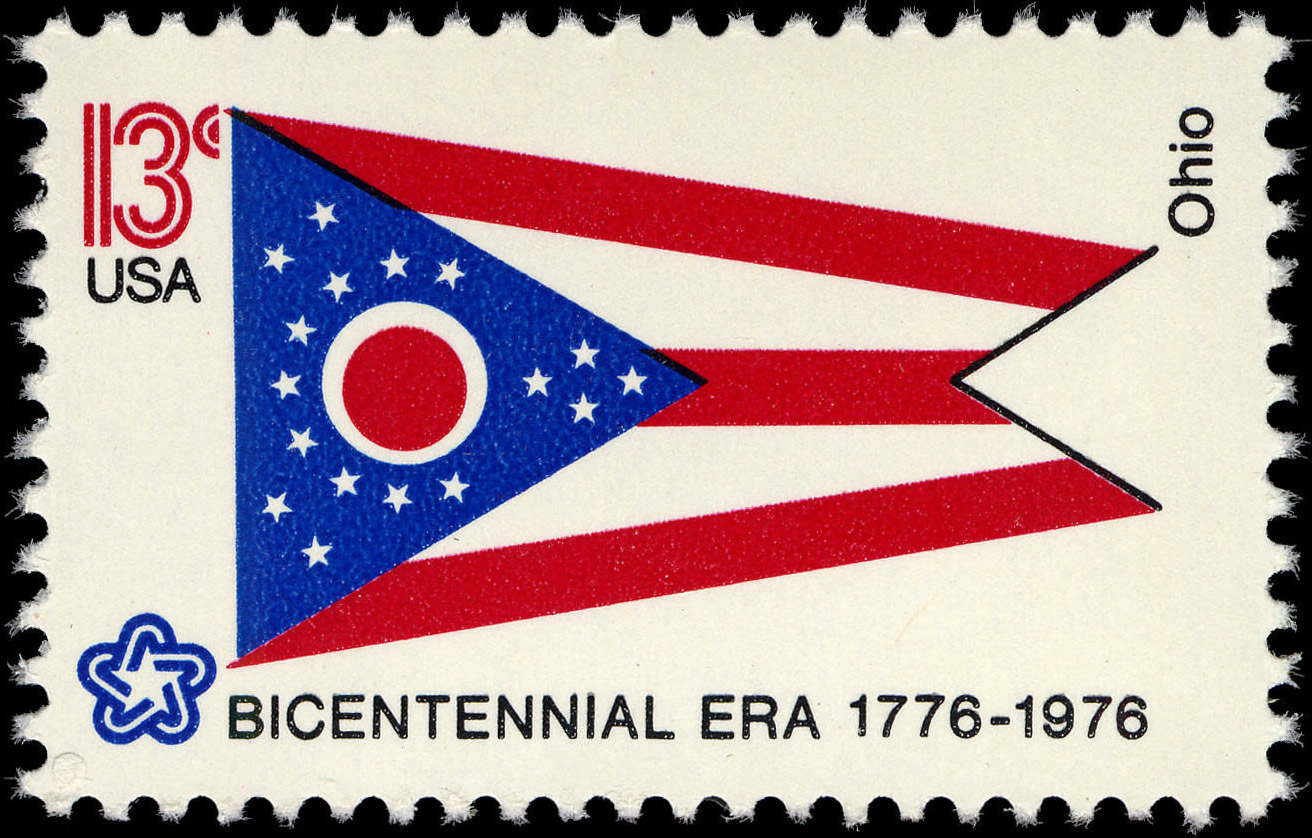
The Ohio state flag as depicted in the 1976 bicentennial postage stamp series.

== Flag of the governor ==
The flag of the governor of Ohio incorporates the 1996 state coat of arms. A physical flag made in the 1950s colors the hills purple and omits the river.

The flag of the governor of Ohio consists of the Great Seal of Ohio encircled with 13 white stars on a scarlet field, with a five-point star in each corner. Like the state flag, it has 17 stars in total.

The adjutant general's office adopted this design in 1905 to represent the governor on official occasions. One such flag hangs in the Rutherford B. Hayes Center Library, a memorial to the 32nd Ohio governor and 19th U.S. president. The design was officially recognized by the 96th General Assembly effective October 3, 1945:

It shall have a white star in each of the four corners on an oblong scarlet background with the official seal of the state of Ohio in the center surrounded by thirteen white stars. The proportional dimensions of the flag and of its various parts shall be according to a design approved by the adjutant general and in accordance with the governor's flag used by the adjutant general's office for over thirty years.

— 96 HJR 49

Since September 30, 1963, the flag has been defined in greater detail:

The flag of the governor of this state will be of scarlet wool bunting, six feet eight inches hoist by ten feet six inches fly. In each of the four corners will be a white five-pointed star with one point upward. The centers of these stars will be twelve inches from the long edges and seventeen inches from the short edges of the flag. In the center of the flag will be a reproduction of the great seal of Ohio in proper colors, three feet in diameter, surrounded by thirteen white stars equally spaced with their centers on an imaginary circle four feet three inches in diameter. All stars shall be of such size that their points would lie on the circumference of an imaginary circle ten inches in diameter.

— Ohio Rev. Code §5.011. "Ohio governor's flag".

The Ohio Revised Code also specifies smaller versions of this design to be used as the governor's naval flag and automobile flag.

== See also ==
- Flag of Cincinnati
- Flag of Cleveland
- Flag of Columbus
- List of Ohio state symbols
- Seal of Ohio
- Flags of the U.S. states
- Flag of Nepal
