= Flag of Columbus, Ohio =

City of Columbus
- Proportion: 10:19
- Adopted: January 28, 1929
- Design: A yellow, white, and red vertical triband with the Seal of Columbus on a blue field in the center

The current city flag of Columbus, Ohio, is a yellow-white-red vertical triband with the city seal on a blue field. Officially, the flag was adopted in 1929, although it is unknown if the flag was ever flown when it was first adopted.

The city's first flag was adopted in 1912. The design consisted of the seal on a blue field. The second and current flag replaced this flag in 1929, but an unofficial flag similar to the one officially defined in legislation rose to higher prominence. Instead of a yellow, white, and red tricolor, it had a red, white, and blue tricolor. It remains unknown how this flag came to be, but after this anomaly was discovered, the city began flying the correct flag.

A redesign of the flag began in 2020. During the George Floyd protests, city mayor Andrew Ginther requested changes to the flag due to its use of imagery related to Christopher Columbus.

== Design and symbolism ==
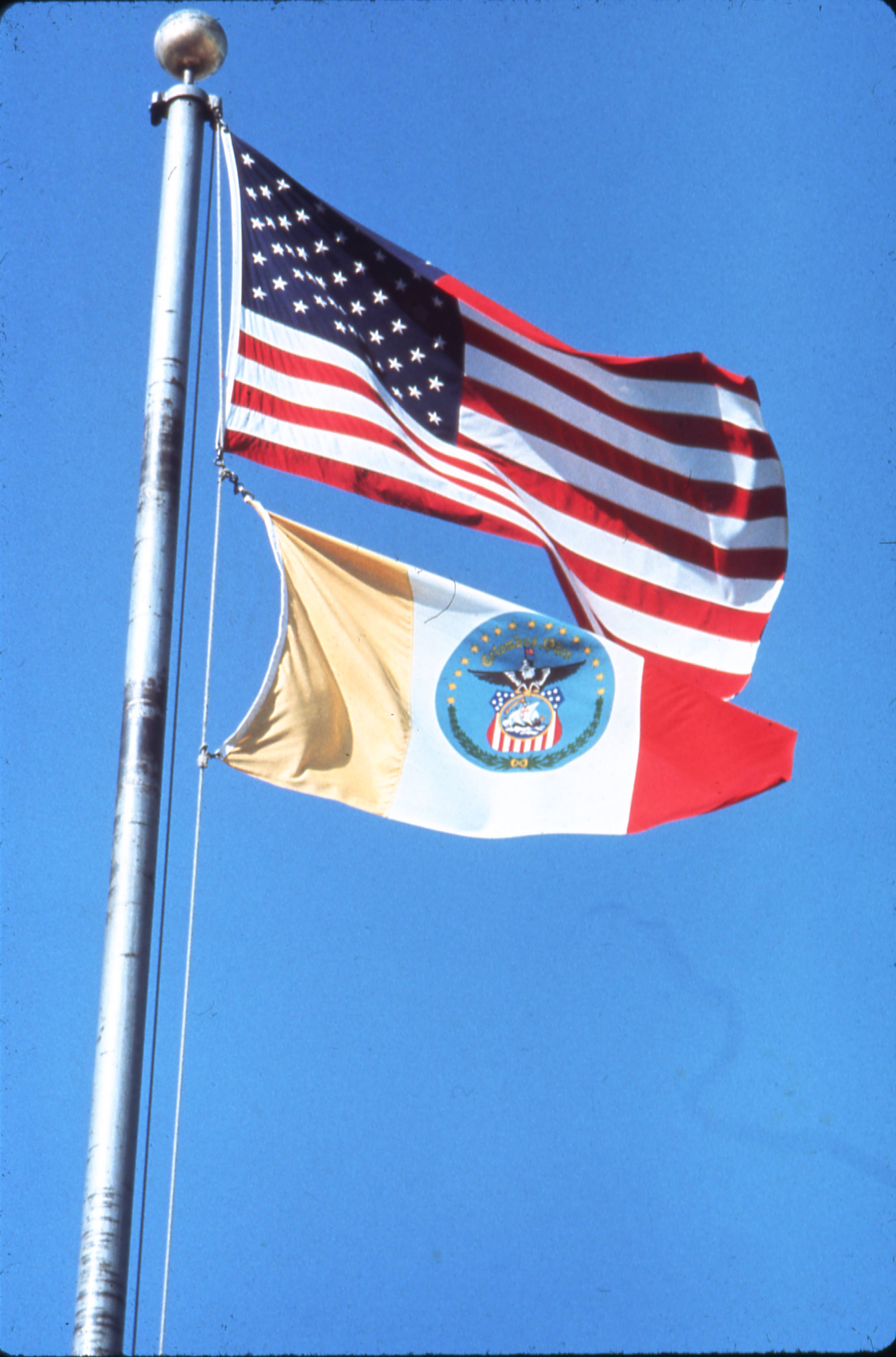
The flag flown alongside the American flag

The chrome yellow, white, and scarlet red triband (officially a 1:1:1 proportion, but is often made as either approximately a 1:2:1 or even a 1:2.3:1 proportion to fit the seal) is a reference to Spain, who funded Christopher Columbus' expeditions to the Americas. Columbus, the namesake of the city, is also referenced near the center of the seal, where a ship of his fleet is depicted. The ship is completely enclosed in a circular yellow border. Surrounding this is a shield modeled on the design of the Flag of the United States, with 13 red and white stripes and 12 white stars (6 on either side of the ship design) on a dark blue background. The city flag's dimensions of 10:19 are also related to the United States flag. Instead of directly stating the proportions, the municipal code of Columbus mandates that the flag be of the same proportions of the United States flag, which was specified to be 20 by 38 (often simplified to 10 by 19) in a 1959 executive order following the admission of Hawaii to the Union. Perched on top of the shield is an eagle with outstretched wings, yet another example of American symbolism. Behind the eagle is the dome of the Ohio State Capitol building, denoting Columbus' importance as Ohio's capital city. Just above the dome is the text "Columbus, Ohio" in yellow old English font. Encircling all the seal's elements mentioned above are 16 yellow five-pointed stars and a half-wreath of buckeye leaves. The eagle is grasping onto a single yellow star, which, with the additional 16 stars, represents Ohio as the seventeenth state to join the Union. The buckeye leaves are another representation of Ohio, as it is the state tree. The seal, adopted in 1912, originally did not contain the blue field. On December 9, 1958, the entire emblem was adopted as the city's seal. Originally, it was only regarded as the coat of arms. The official description of the seal allows for some artistic interpretation, and thus different versions of it have been designed.

The flag's design has been criticized for its celebration of Christopher Columbus, a controversial figure due to his violent tendencies towards natives and colonizers and for his involvement in the Atlantic slave trade. The city has been removing its references to the explorer; following the 2020 George Floyd protests, the city also announced it was looking into changing the city seal and flag, removing its reference to Christopher Columbus.

== History ==
=== First flag ===
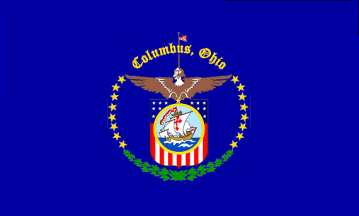
First flag, used from 1912 to 1929

The first flag of Columbus simply consisted of the current seal on a blue field. It was adopted on February 12, 1912, after a committee summoned by the city council chose it. This date is agreed upon by almost all sources regarding the flag, but one 1962 city publication noted the adoption date was September 12, 1912. The resolution adopting the flag read:

On a blue field a half-wreath of buckeye leaves, green, and a half-circle of 16 stars, the whole enclosing a national shield bearing a gilt circle in which appears a galley, or vessel, of the fleet of Christopher Columbus, after whom said city is named, said shield and vessel to be in proper colors, above and clutching the shield to be an eagle, with outspread wings, proper, guarding a gold star, making the seventeenth and representing Ohio. Above and between the wings of the eagle to appear the cupola of the state capitol, surmounted by the lettering "Columbus, Ohio," gilt, in old English letters.

=== Second flag ===
Columbus's second and current flag was adopted by the city council on January 28, 1929, writing an ordinance declaring:

That the official flag of the city of Columbus be as follows:

That the flag be made up of three vertical bars; chrome yellow at the left, scarlet red at the right, and white at the center.

That the seal and coat of arms of the city of Columbus as adopted by resolution of council, February 12, 1912, be placed on the center of the white bar.

That the size of the flag be of the same dimensions as the standard sizes of the flag of the United States.

It is unknown whether this flag saw any use following the resolution. In fact, very little is known about the origin of the flag; even the designer is unknown.

=== Third flag ===
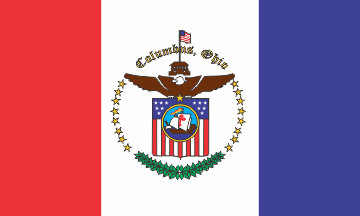
Third flag, used c. 1965–1975

It is unknown when and how the third flag came to be. It featured a red, white, and blue triband, as well as different stripe proportions (officially 1:1:1, 1:1.3:1 was often used). The flag was flown at city council chambers at least as early as 1965, despite the flag never being officially adopted. This version of the flag can be seen in a stained glass window featuring Columbus landmarks, installed in 1965 in Trinity Episcopal Church on Capitol Square in Columbus.

=== Rediscovery and use of second flag ===
Kenneth Huff, a writer from the North American Vexillological Association (NAVA), traveled to Columbus in 1974 to take pictures of the city's flag. Under the impression that the 1929 version of the flag was the one used, he was bewildered to find a red, white, and blue colored flag. He contacted the city clerk's office, who conducted an investigation as to how the flag became the de facto flag of the city. No conclusive reasoning was found. A flag designed by a Columbus Police Department officer that followed the 1929 ordinance was presented to the city council in April 1976, at least 10 years after the incorrect flag was first flown. For the United States Bicentennial in 1976, this design was reinstated with stripe proportions of 1:1.4:1. The current flag proportions of 1:2:1 were adopted around 1985, to fit the seal more comfortably. Also around the time of flag adoption, a new description of the seal gave it a blue field. In a 2004 NAVA survey of 150 American city flags, the Columbus flag ranked 72nd, or 3rd of five Ohio flags (the flags of Cleveland and Cincinnati are higher).

In 2012, the 46th annual NAVA meeting took place in downtown Columbus. As with all annual NAVA meetings, a flag contest was held, which would represent the meeting. These flags usually contain elements that represent the host city. The chosen flag contained a white arc separating blue on the hoist side with red on the fly side. The arc formed the letter "C", standing for Columbus. The color scheme of red, white, and blue is the same scheme for the Flag of Ohio and the Flag of the United States.

=== Proposed redesign ===
Efforts have been made to redesign the flag, perhaps the most notable being "The People's Flag of Columbus", designed by Ohio State University design teacher Paul Nini. It is split into four sections by a white cross in the middle, representing the intersection of Broad and High Street. On the hoist, a light blue semicircle is tucked underneath the white cross, signifying the Scioto River and Franklinton Peninsula. On the fly side, 4 red stripes and 3 white stripes (including one from the white cross) symbolize the Flag of Ohio, as well as the seven city council members that make decisions for the city. In the center is a blue star, representing its status as the capital of Ohio.

The Columbus Art Commission was tasked with redesigning the city flag and seal, following a request from Andrew Ginther during the George Floyd protests. No set deadline was announced for when the design should be finalized.

== Usage ==
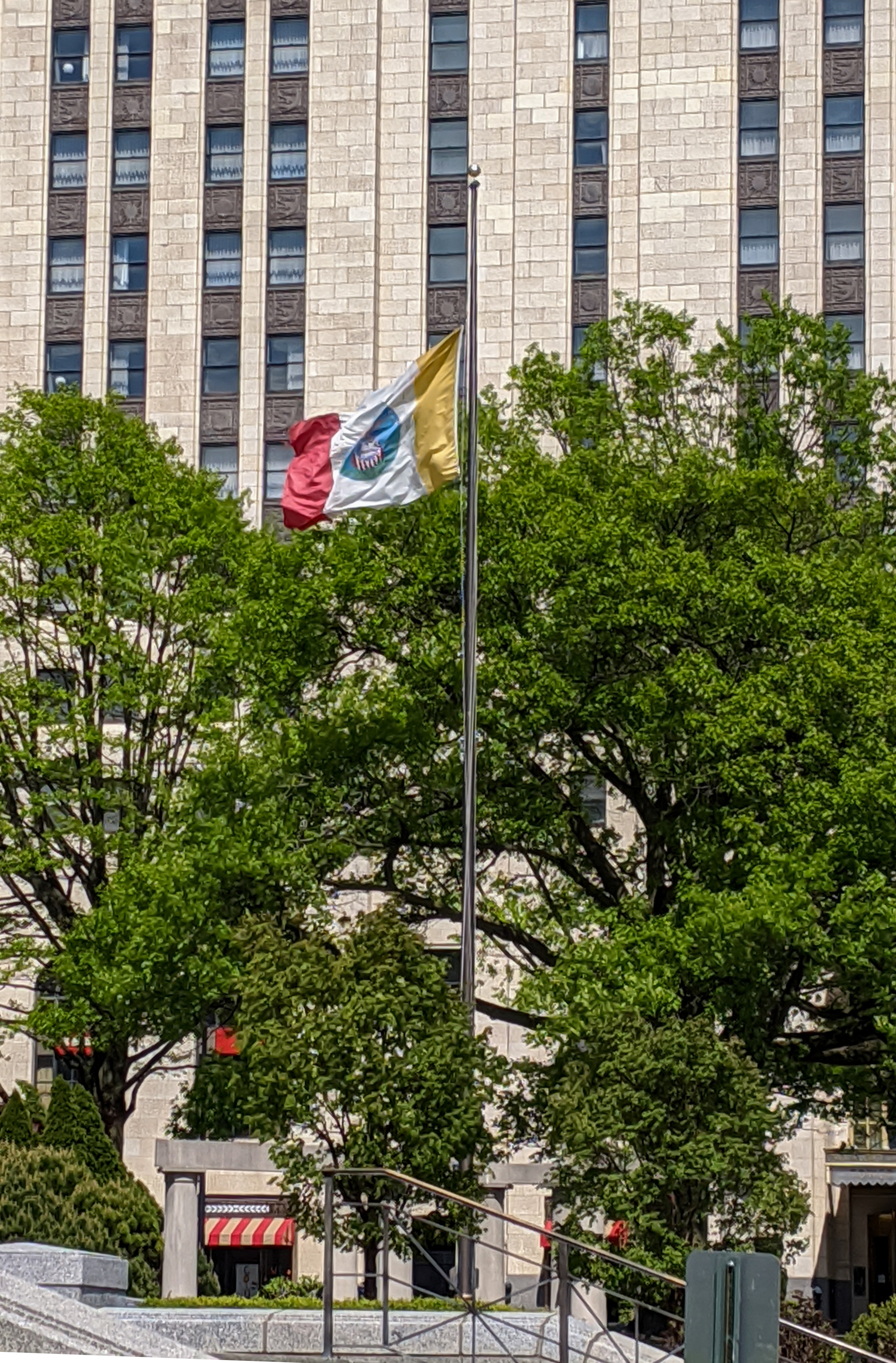
Flag flying outside Columbus City Hall

The municipal code mentioned above also mandated that the flag be flown at Columbus City Hall, always below the Flag of the United States.

Columbus Crew SC's 2016 away kit (known as "For Columbus") was designed using various elements of the flag. It used a yellow, white, and red color scheme, along with seventeen stars on the collar. A miniature version of the flag was also placed in the bottom left of the front side. The city's seal was placed on the inside of the jersey, behind the club's badge and facing the heart.
