= Seal of Ohio =

Versions
- An imitation of the Artist's Version
- Armiger: State of Ohio
- Adopted: 1996 (current form)
- Earlier version(s): Many, starting 1803
- Use: State government offices and letterheads, driver's licenses

The Great Seal of the State of Ohio is the official insignia of the U.S. state of Ohio. All governmental offices, agencies, and courts in Ohio use variations of the state seal. Its primary feature is a circular coat of arms that depicts a sunrise in Chillicothe, Ohio's first capital, along with symbols of the state's origins. The seal sometimes appears with the state motto, "With God, All Things Are Possible".

Shortly after its establishment in 1803, the state adopted a seal based on a sketch by Secretary of State William Creighton, Jr. Except for a brief period during the 1860s, the layout and details were left largely unregulated until a standardized coat of arms, based on the original design, was introduced in 1967. The coat of arms was modified most recently in 1996.

Each of Ohio's 88 counties maintains its own official seal based on the state seal.

== Design ==
Coat of arms of the State of Ohio
- Armiger: State of Ohio
- Adopted: 1953 (current form in 1996)
- Use: State and local government offices, older license plates

The design of the Great Seal of the State of Ohio is defined in Ohio Revised Code section 5.10:

The great seal of the state shall be two and one-half inches in diameter and shall consist of the coat of arms of the state within a circle having a diameter of one and three-fourths inches, surrounded by the words "THE GREAT SEAL OF THE STATE OF OHIO" in news gothic capitals.

— Ohio Rev. Code §5.10

The coat of arms is defined in section 5.04:

The coat of arms of the state shall consist of the following device: a circular shield; in the right foreground of the shield a full sheaf of wheat bound and standing erect; in the left foreground, a cluster of seventeen arrows bound in the center and resembling in form the sheaf of wheat; in the background, a representation of Mount Logan, Ross county, as viewed from Adena state memorial; over the mount, a rising sun three-quarters exposed and radiating thirteen rays to represent the thirteen original colonies shining over the first state in the northwest territory, the exterior extremities of which rays form a semicircle; and uniting the background and foreground, a representation of the Scioto river and cultivated fields.

The coat of arms of the state shall correspond substantially with the following design:

[...]

When the coat of arms of the state is reproduced in color, the colors used shall be substantially the same as the natural color of the terrain and objects shown.

— Ohio Rev. Code §5.04

The hills shown in the seal are managed by the Department of Natural Resources as Great Seal State Park. Ohio was the 17th state admitted to the United States of America, and that is reflected symbolically by the 17 arrows in the foreground of the seal.

== History ==
Ohio's state seal has been redesigned at least ten times in the state's history. From 1805 to 1866, the seal's design was left unspecified, a situation unique among the states.

=== Territorial seal ===
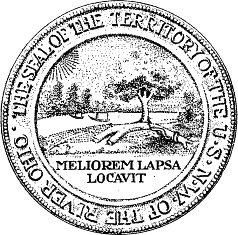
Seal of the Territory of the United States Northwest of the River Ohio Motto: Meliorem lapsa locavit ("He has planted one better than the one fallen")

Before Ohio's statehood, the territorial government of the Northwest Territory had its own seal. The United States Congress passed legislation on May 8, 1792, that directed the U.S. Secretary of State to "provide proper seals for the several and respective public offices in the [Northwest] Territories". A seal was created by the State Department to be used on official papers of the territory. The original seal was maintained by Governor Arthur St. Clair. Its first recorded use was in a proclamation made on July 26, 1788. The seal bears a Latin inscription, Meliorem lapsa locavit, "He has planted one better than the one fallen," commemorating the decline of wilderness to make way for civilization.

=== Rising sun ===
The first Constitution of Ohio, adopted on November 29, 1802, and effective March 1, 1803, provided for a state seal but left the details unspecified:

There shall be a seal of this State, which shall be kept by the Governor and used by him officially, and shall be called "The great Seal of the State of Ohio."

— Ohio Constitution of 1802, Article II, section 14

The first Secretary of State, William Creighton, Jr., initially used his personal seal on official documents.

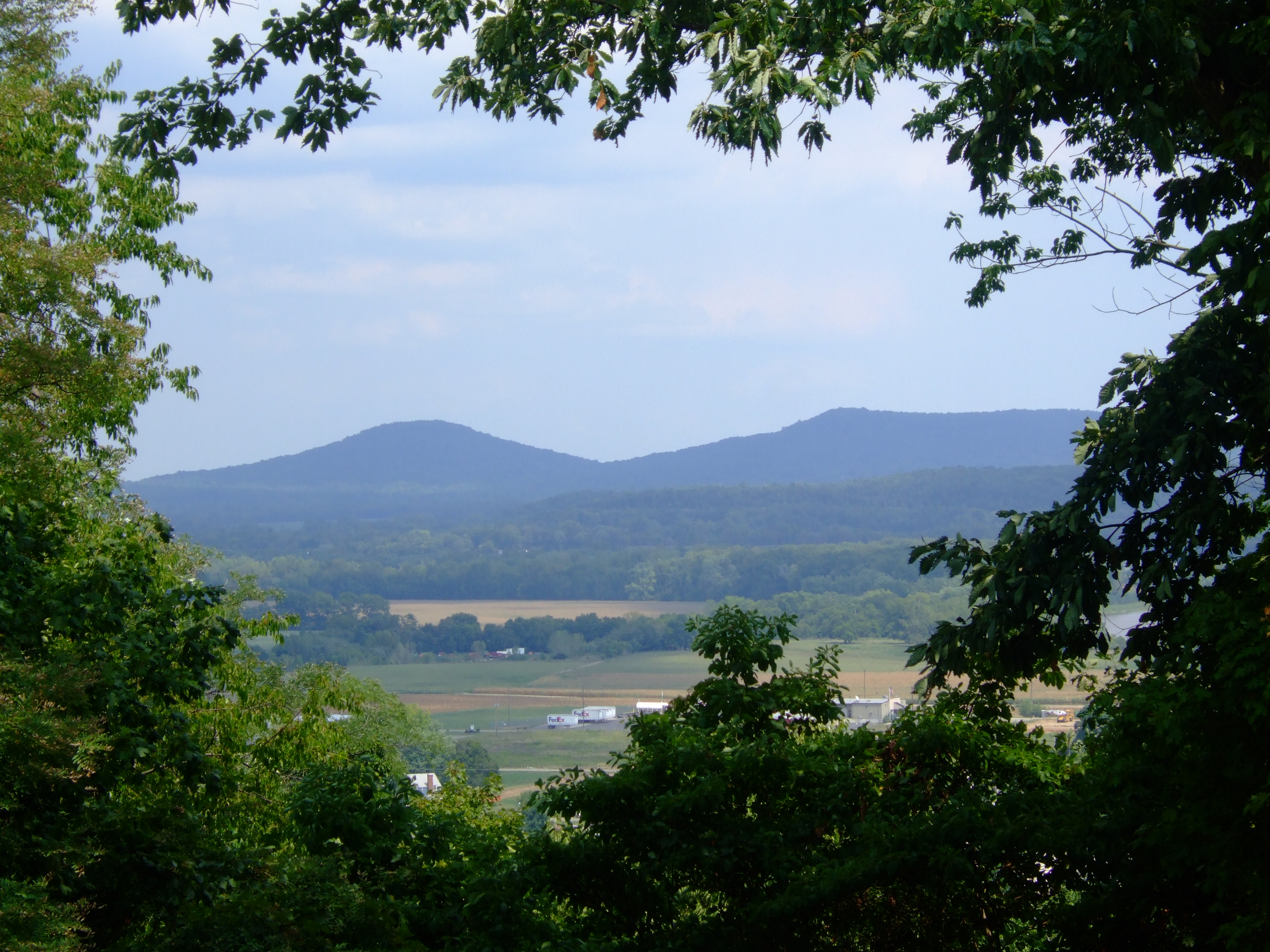
View of Sugarloaf Mountain and Sand Hill from Adena

On March 25, 1803, the General Assembly passed an act concerning the duties of the Secretary of State, introducing the first of many designs for the state seal, based on a sketch by Creighton:

That the secretary of state shall procure a seal, two inches in diameter, for the use of the state; a seal of the supreme court, for each clerk thereof that may be appointed, of one inch and three-fourths in diameter; and also one other seal, one inch and a half diameter, for the use of each and every county now or hereafter to be created; on which seals shall be engraved the following device: On the right side, near the bottom, a sheaf of wheat, and on the left a bundle of seventeen arrows, both standing erect, in the back ground, and rising above the sheaf and arrows a mountain, over which shall appear a rising sun. The state seal to be surrounded with these words, "The great seal of the state of Ohio." The seal of the supreme court, with these words: "The supreme court of the state of Ohio;" and the county seal with these words, "Common pleas of the county of _____," the expense of said seals to be audited by the auditor and paid out of the state treasury.

— Act of 1st General Assembly, March 25, 1803

The design was traditionally said to depict the view from U.S. Senator Thomas Worthington's Chillicothe-area estate, Belle View: in 1803, Creighton emerged from an all-night meeting at the estate and saw "the rising sun of the new state" just beyond Mount Logan. Creighton and Worthington both belonged to the "Chillicothe Junto" that dominated early state politics. However, most historians regard the story to be apocryphal, noting that the sun, mountains, and agricultural implements were common in seals of that era. Regardless, the present seal does represent the view from Worthington's estate, now known as Adena, as a matter of law.

The physical seal of 1803 followed the adopted design loosely: from behind a full mountain range rose a sun with eyes.

=== Deregulation ===
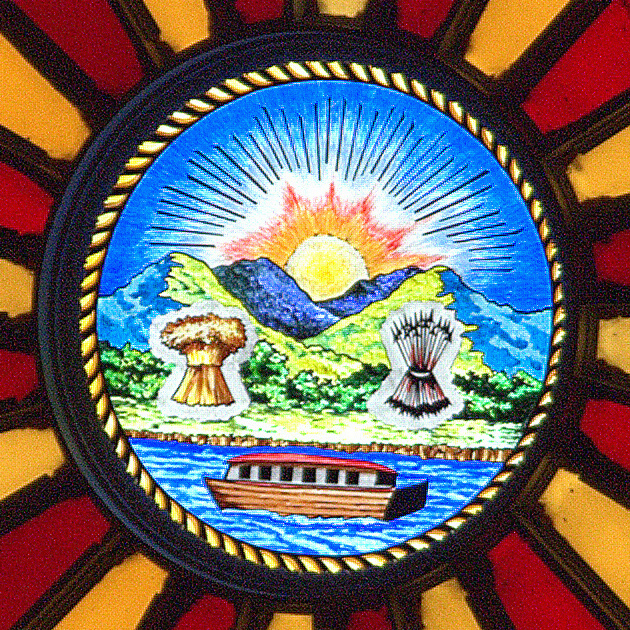
An 1847 seal was placed in the 1861 Ohio Statehouse's rotunda skylight, removed in the 1920s, and restored in 1995.

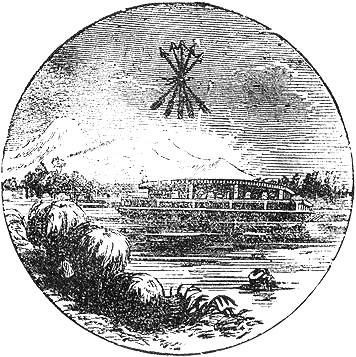
An unofficial 1860s coat of arms shows arrows flying high above the canal.

On February 19, 1805, the 1803 statute was replaced with identical wording, except for the omission of a design for the great seal. The original state seal had long since fallen out of use. Despite the 1805 act being itself repealed on January 31, 1831, no replacement design was specified. Legislators neglected to address the issue even after the Constitution of 1851 left intact the constitutional requirement for a design.

In the meantime, a wide array of designs emerged, particularly on court seals. Common embellishments included a plow and recumbent sheath of wheat, a range of mountains instead of a single peak (as in the Creighton seal), and an "ark" (a broad horn flatboat with a roof) floating on a river (understood to be the Ohio River, quite a distance from Chillicothe). The 1847 seal depicted in the Statehouse rotunda skylight substitutes the Ohio with a canal, replete with a canal boat. In an 1860s version, the arrows levitate among the clouds. Besides artistic liberty, some seals reflected confusion over the state's founding year, which was popularly believed to be 1802, the year the original constitution was adopted.

=== Fleeting empire ===
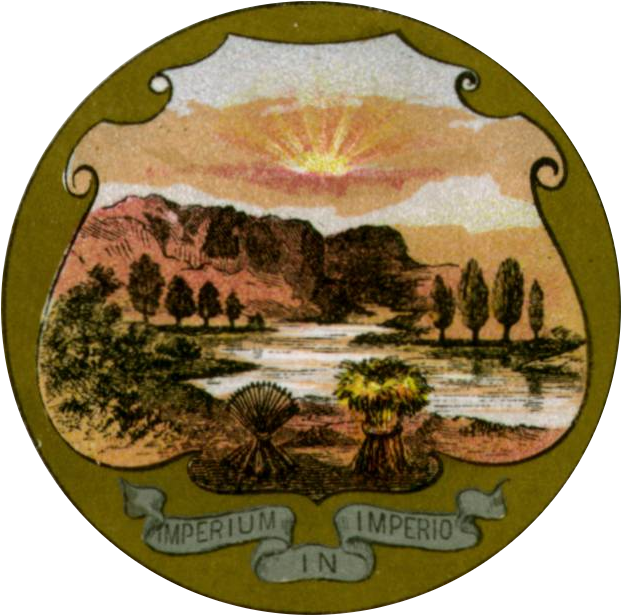
An illustration of the 1866 seal. The engraver omitted many of the embellishments but did include the motto Imperium in imperio.

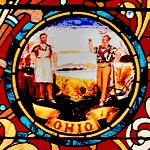
A stained-glass 1866 seal originally hung in 1889 in the San Diego County Superior Courthouse.

In 1865, Secretary of State William Henry Smith issued a report on the need to reign in the seal's design. Though appreciative of the symbolism behind the 1803 design, he found the state's 2-inch (51 mm) seal to compare unfavorably to other states' larger, more ornate seals, which also featured mottoes and obverse designs. On April 6, 1866, a Republican General Assembly responded, calling for an elaborate coat of arms:

That the coat of arms of the state of Ohio shall consist of the following device: A shield, upon which shall be engraved on the left, in the foreground, a bundle of 17 arrows; to the right of the arrows, a sheaf of wheat; both standing erect; in the background, and rising above the sheaf and arrows, a range of mountains and the arrows and sheaf, in the left foreground, a river shall be represented flowing toward the right foreground; supporting the shield, on the right, shall be the figure of a farmer, with implements of agriculture, and sheafs of wheat standing erect and recumbent; and in the distance, a locomotive and train of cars; supporting the shield, on the left, shall be the figure of a smith with anvil and hammer; and in the distance, water, with a steamboat; at the bottom of the shield there shall be a motto, in these words: "Imperium in Imperio."

— 63 Ohio Laws 185

The act increased the size of the great seal to 2 1/2 inches (64 mm) and added mandatory seals for various public officials at the state and county levels. Governor Jacob Dolson Cox issued a proclamation on November 5, 1866, that describes and bears the seal adopted that year.

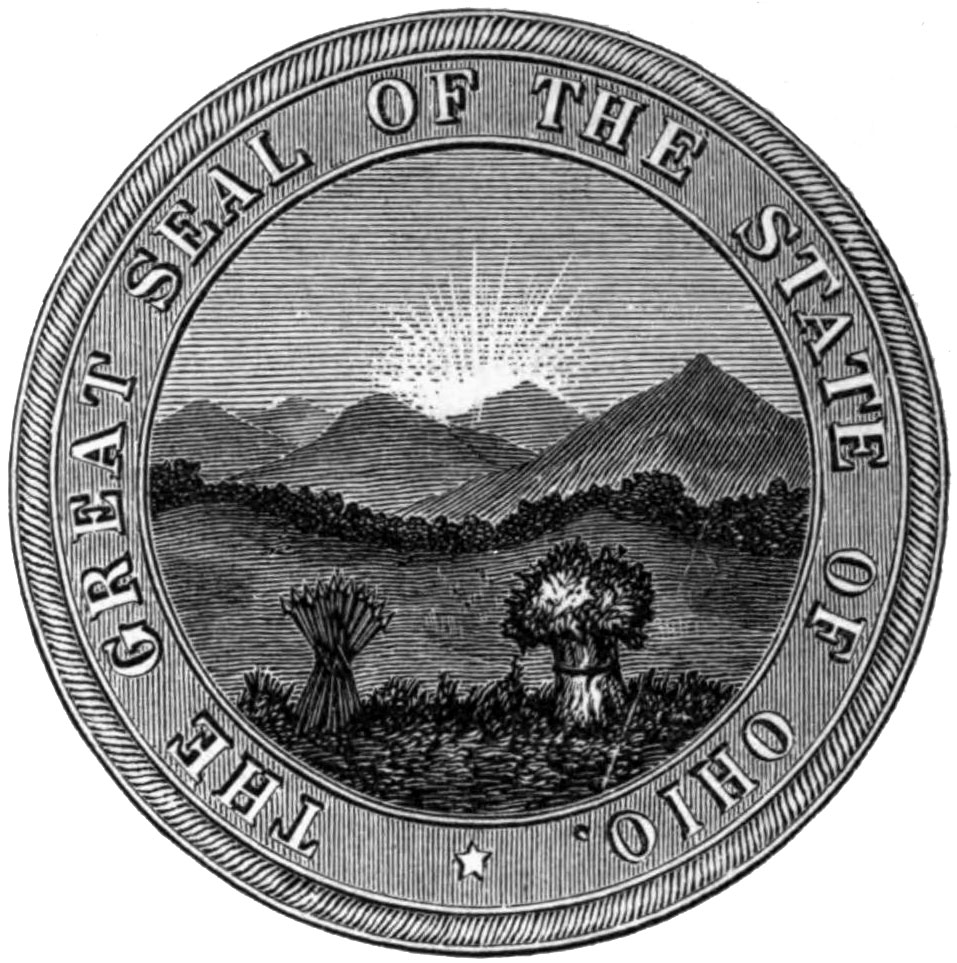
The great seal in 1879. A very similar design was used by the Governor's office in 1902.

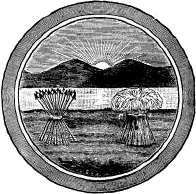
1902 illustration of a state seal.

The Republicans' new motto was problematic, as it ironically recalled states' rights just after the Civil War. Moreover, the increased size, intricate design, and additional seals more than exhausted the $1,000 that had been appropriated to the Secretary of State (equivalent to $16,775 in 2024). An even larger budget overrun would have resulted from an amendment on April 16, 1867.

On May 9, 1868, a newly elected Democratic General Assembly reverted to the 1803 coat of arms and formalized the depiction of a mountain range, present since Creighton's seal. The river remained in contemporary depictions.

Despite the about-face, the 1866 device persisted in various capacities for decades. To the dismay of one historian, the Governor, Secretary of State, and Supreme Court all continued to seal documents with the 1866 device into the 1880s. The State Printer also published books featuring the old seal and motto into the 1900s. In 1889, stained glass seals of 42 states then in existence, including the 1866 Ohio seal, were hung in the Superior Court of San Diego County, California.

=== Standardization ===
A colorized reproduction of the 1967–1996 seal.

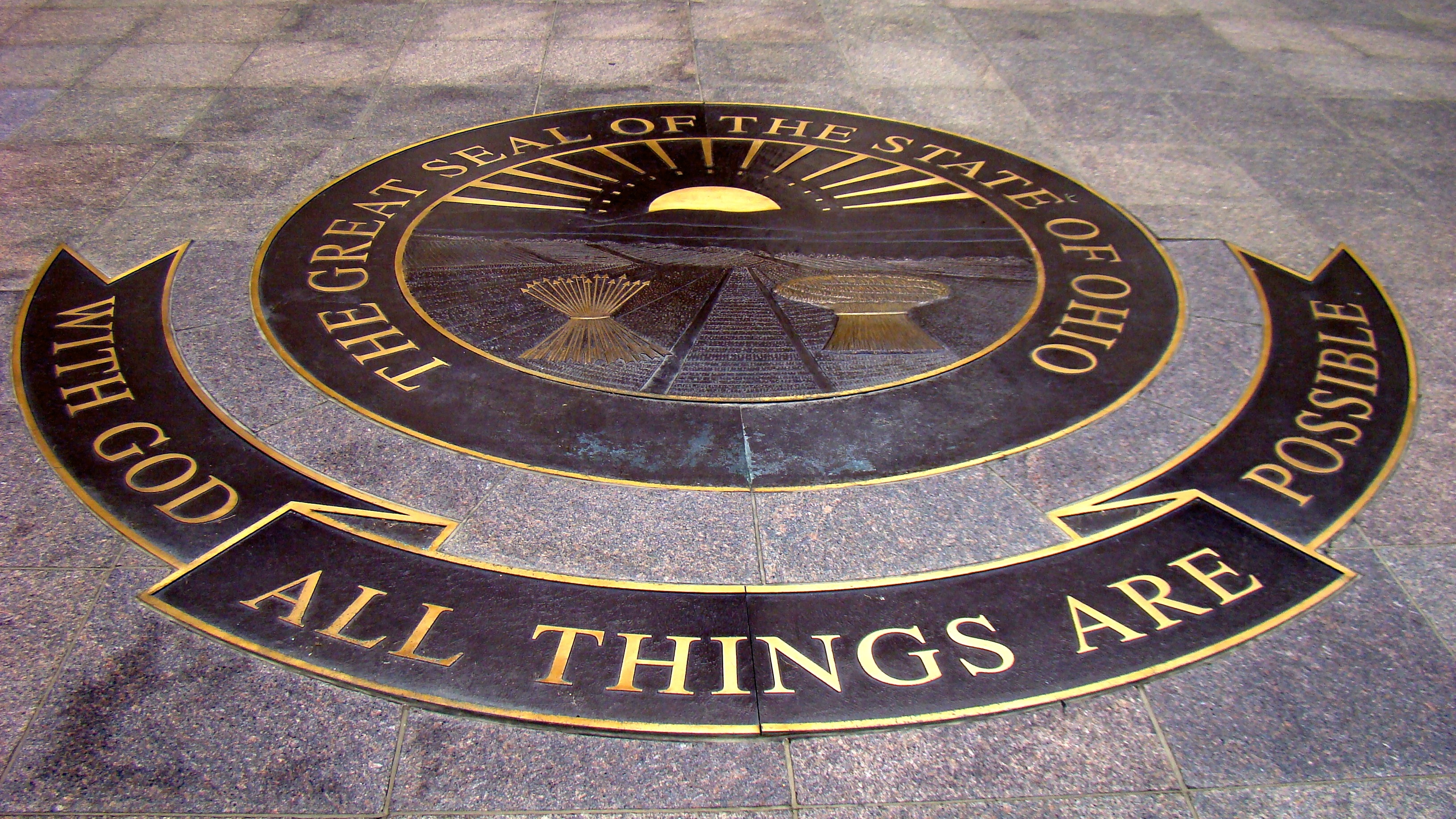
The seal with the motto, "With God, all things are possible", in front of the Ohio Statehouse.

The coat of arms received a substantial revision in December 1967. Cincinnati-based interior decorator Robert Greiwe had been commissioned to paint the Great Seal on the dropped ceiling of the Ohio Statehouse rotunda. His uncertainty over which version to paint led State Representatives Ralph B. Kohnen and Myrl Shoemaker to sponsor 107 HB 164, which standardized a specific design throughout state government. The river was reintroduced to the coat of arms, while seventeen distinct rays of sunlight extended to the perimeter of the coat of arms. Now the scene officially depicted the view from Adena. A reference image was for the first time included in the statute:

The coat of arms of the state shall consist of the following device: a circular shield; in the right foreground of the shield a full sheaf of wheat bound and standing erect; in the left foreground, a cluster of seventeen arrows bound in the center and resembling in form the sheaf of wheat; in the background, a representation of Mount Logan, Ross county, as viewed from Adena state memorial; over the mount, a rising sun three-quarters exposed and radiating seventeen rays, the exterior extremities of which form a semicircle; and uniting the background and foreground, a representation of the Scioto river and cultivated fields. The coat of arms of the state shall correspond substantially with the following design:

[...]

When the coat of arms of the state is reproduced in color, the colors shall be substantially the same as the natural color of the terrain and objects shown.

Under the new legislation, the Governor was given authorization to regulate the seal's use. All new seals acquired after January 1, 1969, were required to bear the new design, and the requirement was extended to county and municipal governments for the first time. Many cities had already adopted seals that bore no relation to the state seal, but they were exempted under a grandfather clause. Though the physical Great Seal was also exempted, the Governor's office eventually replaced it with one that conformed to the new design.

The latest modification, adopted November 20, 1996, reduced the number of rays from 17 to 13, "to represent the thirteen original colonies shining over the first state in the northwest territory". The reference image was also modified to include a small dot at the interior end of each ray. The bill's sponsor, Senator Roy Ray, argued that the number 17 was already present in the bundle of arrows. State agencies were given a deadline of March 1, 2003 – the state bicentennial – to update the seal on all publications. There were unsuccessful attempts in 1997, 1999, 2003, and 2011 to add the Wright Flyer to the seal.

== Usage ==
"Sunburst" featured the upper half of the Ohio coat of arms.

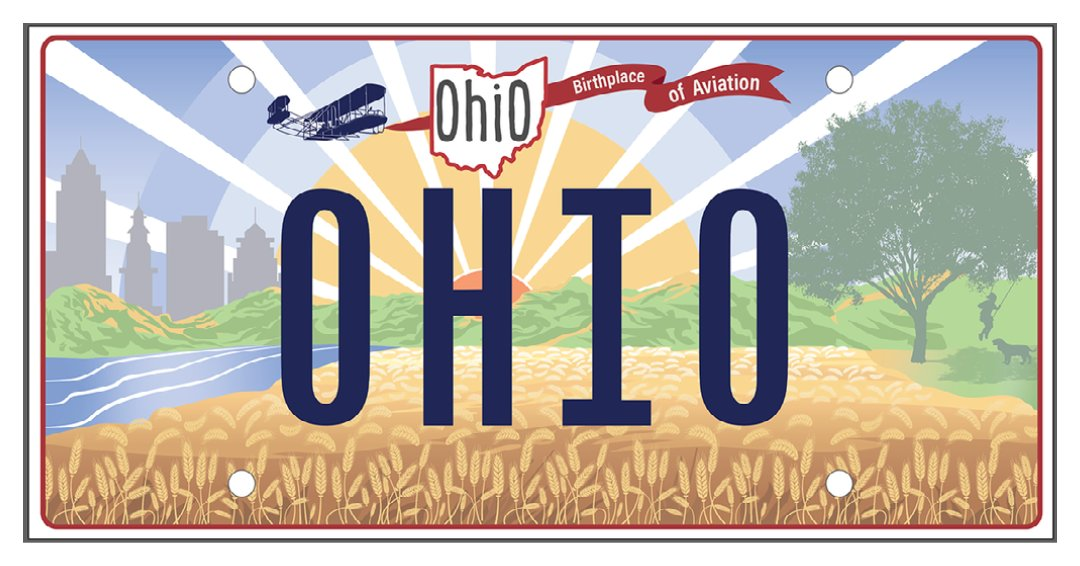
"Sunrise in Ohio" prominently features elements of the Artist's Version.

Section 5.10 of the Ohio Revised Code requires the seals of all "state, county, and municipal agencies, divisions, boards and commissions" to bear the state coat of arms. It also specifies the exact wording of the text surrounding the coat of arms of various courts and statewide elected offices. Notaries public are also required to incorporate the state coat of arms in their seals. Various state agencies, such as the Departments of Transportation and Veterans Services, along with many cities, have developed more distinctive emblems and logos to complement their seals.

The state coat of arms appears in the center of the flag of the governor of Ohio. This design was adopted unofficially in 1905 and officially in 1945. Previously, in 1860, state militia officials unsuccessfully proposed a state flag consisting of the seal upon a white field.

From 2004 to 2010, the state's official coat of arms served as a backdrop for the Bureau of Motor Vehicles' "Sunburst" license plate design, which was issued over a longer period than any other design since the 1980s. Since 2021, the full-color Artist's Version also appears in the background of the "Sunrise in Ohio" license plate design.

=== Variations ===
Seals of state government offices
Seal of the governor of Ohio

Seal of the lieutenant governor of Ohio

Seal of the Ohio House of Representatives

Seal of the Ohio Senate

Seal of the president of the Ohio Senate

Seal of the Supreme Court of Ohio

Seal of the secretary of state of Ohio

Seal of the attorney general of Ohio

Seal of the Ohio state treasurer

Seal of the Ohio state auditor

Seal of the inspector general of Ohio

Seal of the Ohio Department of Agriculture

Seal of the Ohio Bureau of Motor Vehicles

Seal of the Ohio Department of Commerce

Seal of the Ohio Department of Taxation

Seal of the Ohio Commission on Hispanic and Latino Affairs

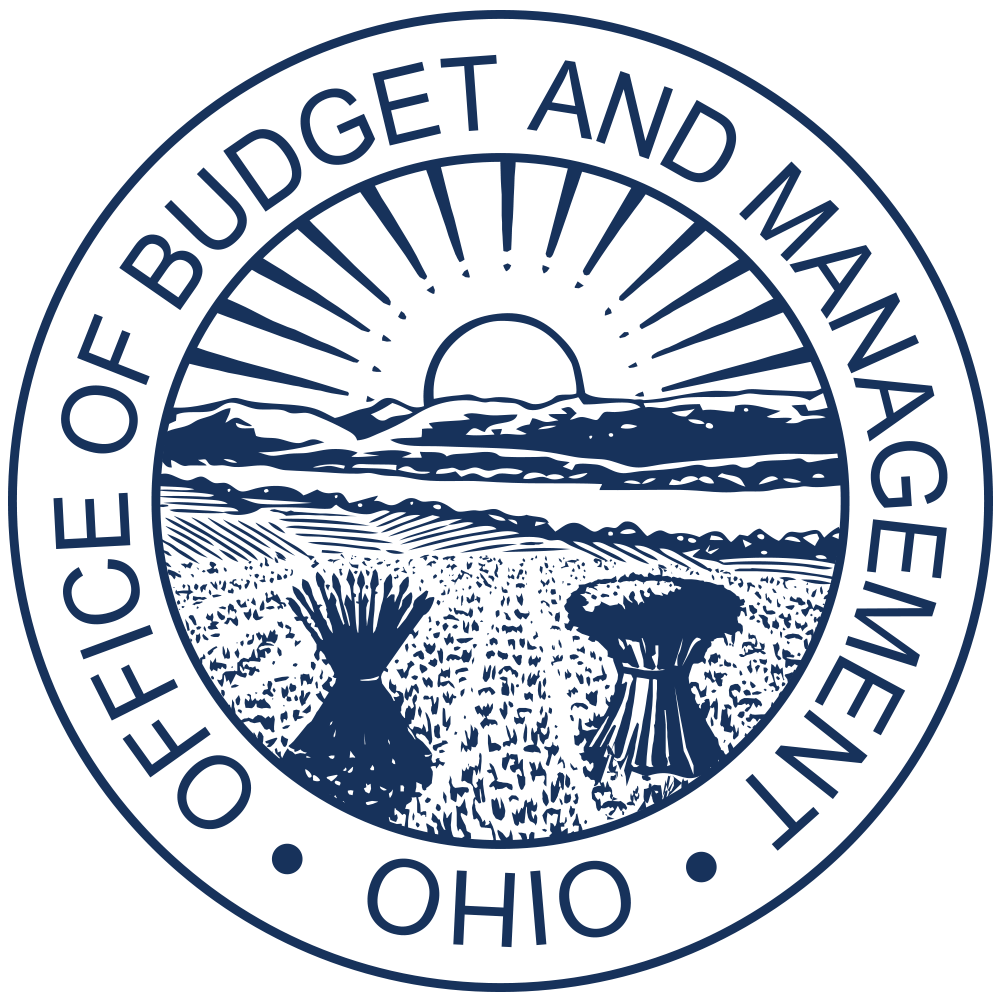
Seal of the Ohio Office of Budget and Management

Seal of the Ohio Elections Commission

Seal of the Ohio Ethics Commission

Seal of the Ohio Civil Rights Commission

Seal of the Ohio consumers' counsel

Seal of the Ohio public defender

Seal of the Ohio Medical Board
Seals of other government associations
Seal of the County Auditors' Association of Ohio

Seal of the County Treasurers Association of Ohio
Seals of local governments
Seal of the City of Hubbard

Seal of the City of Portsmouth

Seal of the City of Youngstown

Seal of Adams County

Seal of Columbiana County

Seal of Fairfield County

Seal of Franklin County

Seal of Guernsey County

Seal of Hamilton County

Seal of Hancock County

Seal of Highland County

Seal of Mahoning County

Seal of Ross County

Seal of Warren County

== See also ==
- List of Ohio state symbols
- Seal of Cincinnati
