= List of flags with Latin-language text =

This is a list of flags inscribed with Latin-language text.

Flag	Dates used	Latin text	English translation
Aguascalientes	?–present	1. BONA TERRA, BONA GENS; 2. AQUA CLARA, CLARUS CŒLUM	1. GOOD EARTH, GOOD PEOPLE; 2. CLEAR WATER, CLEAR SKY
Alabama (reverse)	1861–65	NOLI ME TANGERE	TOUCH ME NOT
Alabama (Governor)	1939–present	AUDEMUS JURA NOSTRA DEFENDERE	WE DARE DEFEND OUR RIGHTS
Alajuela Province	?–present	POR [sic] PATRIA NOSTRA SANGUIS NOSTEA	FOR OUR COUNTRY OUR BLOOD
Alamance County, North Carolina	?–present	PRO BONO PUBLICO	FOR THE PUBLIC GOOD
Albania	1939–43	FERT FERT FERT	disputed; see FERT
Gmina Andrzejewo	2009–present	AC [abbreviation of "Andreas Circius"]	AK [abbreviation of "Andrzej Krzycki"]
Annapolis, Maryland	?–present	VIXI LIBER ET MORIAR	I HAVE LIVED AND I SHALL DIE FREE
Andalusia	1918–present	DOMINATOR HERCULES FUNDATOR	HERCULES RULER AND FOUNDER
Andorra	1971–present	VIRTUS UNITA FORTIOR	VIRTUE UNITED IS STRONGER
Arad, Romania	1990–present	VIA VERITAS VITA	THE WAY THE TRUTH THE LIFE
Atlanta	?–present	RESURGENS	RISING
Augusta County, Virginia	?–present	REDEANT IN AURUM SECULA PRISCUM	LET US RETURN TO THAT FIRST GOLDEN AGE
Badajoz	?–present	PLVS VLTRA	FURTHER BEYOND
Badajoz Province	?–present	PLVS VLTRA	FURTHER BEYOND
Bahamas	1869–1964	1. EXPULSIS PIRATIS; 2. RESTITUTA COMMERCIA	1. PIRATES EXPELLED; 2. COMMERCE RESTORED
Beirut	?–present	BERYTUS NUTRIX LEGUM	BEIRUT MOTHER OF LAWS
Belize	1981–present	SUB UMBRA FLOREO	I FLOURISH IN THE SHADE
Bergen	?–present	SIGILLVM COMMVNITATIS DE CIVITATE BERGENSI	SEAL OF THE TOWN COMMUNITY OF BERGEN
Borgo Maggiore	?–present	LIBERTAS	LIBERTY
Boston	1917–present	1. SICUT PATRIBUS SIT DEUS NOBIS; 2. BOSTONIA; 3. CONDITA AD 1630; 4. CIVITATIS REGIMINE DONATA AD 1822	1. AS GOD WAS WITH OUR FATHERS SO MAY HE BE WITH US; 2. BOSTON; 3. FOUNDED AD 1630; 4. CITY GOVERNMENT ESTABLISHED AD 1822
Bridgeport, Connecticut	?–present	INDUSTRIA CRESCIMUS	BY INDUSTRY WE THRIVE
British Empire (unofficial)	1910–45	EX UNITATE VIRES	UNION IS STRENGTH
British Guiana	1906–66	DAMUS PETIMUSQUE VICISSIM	WE GIVE AND EXPECT IN RETURN
British Virgin Islands	1960–present	VIGILATE	BE WATCHFUL
British Virgin Islands (Civil Ensign)	1960–present	VIGILATE	BE WATCHFUL
British Virgin Islands (Governor)	1960–present	VIGILATE	BE WATCHFUL
British Windward Islands	1886–1953	I PEDE FAUSTO	GO WITH A LUCKY FOOT
British Windward Islands (Governor-in-chief)	1886–1960	I PEDE FAUSTO	GO WITH A LUCKY FOOT
The Bronx	1912–present	NE CEDE MALIS	YIELD NOT TO EVIL
Cádiz Province	?–present	1. HERCVLES FVNDATOR GADIUM DOMINATORQVE; 2. PLVS VLTRA	1. HERCULES FOUNDER AND RULER OF CÁDIZ; 2. FURTHER BEYOND
California (Governor)	?–present	EUREKA	I HAVE FOUND IT
Cape Colony	1876–1910	SPES BONA	GOOD HOPE
Caroline County, Maryland	?–present	TERRA DULCIS VIVENDUM	LAND OF PLEASANT LIVING
Chile (Patria Vieja)	1812–14	1. POST TENEBRAS LUX; 2. AUT CONSILIO [sic] AUT ENSE	1. LIGHT AFTER DARKNESS; 2. EITHER BY MEETING OR BY THE SWORD
Cincinnati	1896–present	JUNCTA JUVANT	UNITY ASSISTS
Colorado	1907–11	NIL SINE NUMINE	NOTHING WITHOUT PROVIDENCE
Connecticut	1897–present	QUI TRANSTULIT SUSTINET	HE WHO TRANSPLANTED STILL SUSTAINS
Czech and Slovak Federative Republic (President)	1990–92	VERITAS VINCIT	TRUTH PREVAILS
Detroit	1948–present	1. SPERAMUS MELIORA; 2. RESURGET CINERIBUS	1. WE HOPE FOR BETTER THINGS; 2. IT WILL RISE FROM THE ASHES
Dollard-des-Ormeaux	?–present	VIRIBUS UNITAS	UNITED FORCE
Drogheda	?–present	Deus praesidium mercatura decus	God our strength, merchandise our glory
Extremadura	1983–present	PLVS VLTRA	FURTHER BEYOND
Fairfax County, Virginia	?–present	FARE FAC	FAIRFAX
Flores Department	?–present	LABOR IMPROBA OMNIA VINCIT	STEADY WORK OVERCAME ALL THINGS
Gabon (President)	1963–present	UNITI PROGREDIEMUR	WE SHALL GO FORWARD UNITED
Gibraltar (civil ensign)	1996–present	MONTIS INSIGNIA CALPE	BADGE OF THE ROCK OF GIBRALTAR
Gibraltar (government ensign)	1875–present	MONTIS INSIGNIA CALPE	BADGE OF THE ROCK OF GIBRALTAR
Gibraltar (governor)	1837–1982	MONTIS INSIGNIA CALPE	BADGE OF THE ROCK OF GIBRALTAR
Gipuzkoa	?–present	FIDELISSIMA BARDULIA NUMQUAM SUPERATA	NOBLE BARDULIA NEVER CONQUERED
Gran Colombia	1820–21	VIXIT ET VINCET AMORE PATRIAE	
Grenada	1875–1903	HAE TIBI ERUNT ARTES	THESE SHALL BE YOUR ARTS
Grenada	1903–67	CLARIOR E TENEBIS	LIGHT OUT OF DARKNESS
Guatemala (state flag)	1858–71	1. GUATIMALÆ RESPUBLICA; 2. PROTECTIONE SUB D.O.M.; [abbreviation of "Deus Optimus Maximus"]	1. REPUBLIC OF GUATEMALA; 2. UNDER THE PROTECTION OF ALMIGHTY GOD
Kingdom of Haiti	1811–20	EX CINERVBVS NASCITVR	THE EMPIRE SHALL RISE FROM ITS ASHES
Huelva Province	?–present	PROTUS MARIS ET TERRE CUSTODIA	PROTECTOR OF SEAPORTS AND LAND
Huelva	?–present	PROTUS MARIS ET TERRE CUSTODIA	PROTECTOR OF SEAPORTS AND LAND
Huesca Province	?–present	V.V. OSCA [abbreviation of "VRBS VICTRIX OSCA]	VICTORIOUS CITY OF HUESCA
Huesca	?–present	V.V. OSCA [abbreviation of "VRBS VICTRIX OSCA]	VICTORIOUS CITY OF HUESCA
Idaho	1897–present	ESTO PERPETUA	LET IT BE ETERNAL
Iquitos	?–present	CARPENT TUA POMA NEPOTES	YOUR CHILDREN WILL HARVEST YOUR FRUITS
Jamaica	1906–62	INDVS VTERQVE SERVIET VNI	BOTH INDIES SHALL SERVE AS ONE
Jamaica	1906–62	INDVS VTERQVE SERVIET VNI	BOTH INDIES SHALL SERVE AS ONE
Kansas	1961–present	AD ASTRA PER ASPERA	TO THE STARS THROUGH DIFFICULTIES
Kansas (Governor)	1961–present	AD ASTRA PER ASPERA	TO THE STARS THROUGH DIFFICULTIES
Kosovo (President)	1992–2007	DARDANIA	DARDANIA
Lancaster, Pennsylvania	?–present	Lan-castra, Britannia	Lancaster, Britain
Lazio	?–present	S P Q S [abbreviation of "Senatus Populusqus Sabinus"]	[abbreviation of "The Senate and the Sabine People"]
Lima	?–present	1. I K; [abbreviation of "Ioanna" and "Karolus"]: 2. HOC SIGNUM VERE REGUM EST	1. J C; [abbreviation of "Joanna" and "Charles"]: 2. THIS IS THE REAL SIGN OF THE KINGS
Maine	1909–present	DIRIGO	I LEAD
Malabo	Until 1968	1. FIDES; 2. BIAFRA	1. FAITH; 2. BIAFRA
Marondera	?–present	FLOREAT MARONDERA	LET MARONDERA FLOURISH
Massachusetts	1971–present	ENSE PETIT PLACIDAM SVB LIBERATE QVIETEM	BY THE SWORD WE SEEK PEACE BUT PEACE ONLY UNDER LIBERTY
Massachusetts (Governor)	1971–present	ENSE PETIT PLACIDAM SVB LIBERATE QVIETEM	BY THE SWORD WE SEEK PEACE BUT PEACE ONLY UNDER LIBERTY
Mauritius	1869–1968	STELLA CLAVISQUE MARIS INDICI	STAR AND KEY OF THE INDIAN OCEAN
Mauritius (civil ensign)	1968–present	STELLA CLAVISQUE MARIS INDICI	STAR AND KEY OF THE INDIAN OCEAN
Mauritius (state ensign)	1968–present	STELLA CLAVISQUE MARIS INDICI	STAR AND KEY OF THE INDIAN OCEAN
Mauritius (President)	1968–present	STELLA CLAVISQUE MARIS INDICI	STAR AND KEY OF THE INDIAN OCEAN
Melilla	?–present	1. PRÆFERRE PATRIAM LIBERIS PARENTEM DECET; 2. NON PLVS VLTRA	1. IT IS SEEMLY FOR A PARENT TO PUT HIS FATHERLAND BEFORE HIS CHILDREN; 2. NOTHING FARTHER BEYOND
Michigan	1911–present	1. E PLURIBUS UNUM; 2. TUEBOR; 3. SI QUÆRIS PENINSULAM AMŒNAM CIRCUMSPICE	1. OUT OF MANY, ONE; 2. I WILL DEFEND; 3. IF YOU SEEK A PLEASANT PENINSULA LOOK AROUND YOU
Michigan (Governor)	1911–present	1. E PLURIBUS UNUM; 2. TUEBOR; 3. SI QUÆRIS PENINSULAM AMŒNAM CIRCUMSPICE	1. OUT OF MANY, ONE; 2. I WILL DEFEND; 3. IF YOU SEEK A PLEASANT PENINSULA LOOK AROUND YOU
Missouri	1913	1. SALUS POPULI SUPREME LEX ESTO; 2. MDCCCXX	1. LET THE WELFARE OF THE PEOPLE BE THE SUPREME LAW; 2. 1820
Newfoundland	1870–1904	1. TERRA NOVA	1. NEW LAND
Newfoundland (civil ensign)	1870–1931	1. TERRA NOVA; 2. HÆC TIBI DONA FERO	1. NEW LAND; 2. THESE GIFTS I BRING THEE
Newfoundland	1907–31	1. TERRA NOVA; 2. HÆC TIBI DONA FERO	1. NEW LAND; 2. THESE GIFTS I BRING THEE
New York	1788–present	EXCELSIOR	HIGHER [or EVER UPWARD]
New York (Governor)	?–present	EXCELSIOR	HIGHER [or EVER UPWARD]
New York City	1977–present	SIGILLUM CIVITATIS NOVI EBORACI	SEAL OF THE CITY OF NEW YORK
Nuevo León	?–present	SEMPER ASCENDENS	ALWAYS ASCENDING
North Dakota	1943–present	E PLURIBUS UNUM	OUT OF MANY, ONE
Olomouc Region	?–present	S P Q O [abbreviation of "Senatus Populusqus Olomucium"]	[abbreviation of "The Senate and the Olomouc People"]
Oslo	?–present	UNANIMETER ET CONSTANTER	UNITED AND CONSTANT
Osorno, Chile	?–present	1. PRO PATRIA NEC ASPERA TERRENT; 2. FIDE ET AMORE	1. FOR COUNTRY FRIGHTENED BY NO DIFFICULTIES; 2. FAITH AND LOVE
Palencia Province	?–present	AVE MARIA	HAIL MARY
Philadelphia	1874–present	PHILADELPHIA MANETO	LET BROTHERLY LOVE ENDURE
Prince George's County, Maryland	1963–present	SEMPER EADEM	ALWAYS THE SAME
Puerto Rico (Governor)	?–present	JOANNES EST NOMEN EJVS	JOHN IS HIS NAME
Rhodesia	1968–79	SIT NOMINE DIGNA	MAY SHE BE WORTHY OF THE NAME
Rhodesia (President)	1968–79	SIT NOMINE DIGNA	MAY SHE BE WORTHY OF THE NAME
Rio de Janeiro	?–present	RECTE REM PUBLICAM GERERE	CONDUCT THE AFFAIRS OF THE PUBLIC WITH RIGHTEOUSNESS
Recife	?–present	VIRTUS ET FIDES	STRENGTH AND COURAGE
Roman Republic (military flag)	1849	GUARDIA CIVICA ROMANA	GUARD OF THE ROMAN REPUBLIC
Saint-Lambert, Quebec	?–present	Maximus in minimis	The greatest in the smallest detail
Saint Vincent	1979–85	PAX ET JUSITITIA	PEACE AND JUSTICE
Saint Vincent	1907–79	PAX ET JUSITITIA	PEACE AND JUSTICE
Samogitia	?–present	PATRIA UNA	ONE NATION
San Diego	1934–present	SEMPER VIGILANS	EVER VIGILANT
San Marino	1465–present	LIBERTAS	LIBERTY
City of San Marino	?–present	LIBERTAS	LIBERTY
São Paulo	?–present	NON DVCOR DVCO	I AM NOT LED I LEAD
Gmina Secemin	?–present	IN PRINCIPIO	IN THE BEGINNING
Seychelles	1903–76	FINIT CORONAT OPVS	THE END CROWNS THE WORK
Seychelles (Governor)	1903–76	FINIT CORONAT OPVS	THE END CROWNS THE WORK
Seychelles (President)	1977–present	FINIT CORONAT OPVS	THE END CROWNS THE WORK
Shanghai International Settlement	c. 1917 – 1943	OMNIA JUNCTA IN UNO	ALL JOINED IN ONE
Sierra Leone	1916–61	AUSPICE BRITTANIA LIBER	FREE UNDER THE PROTECTION OF BRITAIN
Sint Maarten	1985–present	SEMPER PRO GREDIENS	ALWAYS PROGRESSING
Soacha	?–present	SOL OMNIBUS LUCET	THE SUN SHINES ON ALL
South Georgia and the South Sandwich Islands	1985–present	LEO TERRAM PROPRIAM PROTEGAT	LET THE LION PROTECT HIS OWN LAND
South Georgia and the South Sandwich Islands (Commissioner)	1999–present	LEO TERRAM PROPRIAM PROTEGAT	LET THE LION PROTECT HIS OWN LAND
Spain	1981–present	PLVS VLTRA	FURTHER BEYOND
Spain	1939–81	PLVS VLTRA	FURTHER BEYOND
Spain	1931–39	PLVS VLTRA	FURTHER BEYOND
Spain (President)	1931–36	PLVS VLTRA	FURTHER BEYOND
Spain (President)	1936–39	PLVS VLTRA	FURTHER BEYOND
Municipality of Štip	?–present	АСТІВО	ACTIBO [Latin place name for the Štip region]
Subotica	?–present	SIGILLUM LIBERÆ ET REGIÆ CIVITATIS MARIA THERESIOPOLIS	SEAL OF THE FREE AND ROYAL CITY OF MARIA THERESIOPOLIS
Suriname (President)	1975–present	JUSTICIA PIETAS FIDES	JUSTICE PIETY TRUST
Suriname (Prime Minister)	1975–88	JUSTICIA PIETAS FIDES	JUSTICE PIETY TRUST
Swaziland (royal standard)	1986–present	MIIIR [abbreviation of "Mswati III Rex"]	MIIIK [abbreviation of "Mswati III King"]
Tangier International Zone	1923–56	TINGIS	TANGIER
Tlaxcala	?–present	K [abbreviation of "Karolus"]	C [abbreviation of "Charles"]
Toledo Province	?–present	PLVS VLTRA	FURTHER BEYOND
Tongatapu	1858–62	A M [abbreviation of "Ave Maria"]	H M [abbreviation of "Hail Mary"]
Trinidad	1889–1962	MISCERIQUE PROBAT POPULOS ET FŒDERA JUNGI	SHE IS CONTENT TO MAKE TREATIES AND UNITE PEOPLES
Trujillo, Peru	?–present	K [abbreviation of "Karolus"]	C [abbreviation of "Charles"]
Gmina Tuczępy	?–present	ECCE AGNUS DEI	BEHOLD THE LAMB OF GOD
Tumbes, Peru	?–present	KAROLI CESARIS AVSPITIO ET LABORE INGENIO AC IMPENSA DUCIS PIZARRO INVENTA ET PACATA	UNDER THE AUSPICES OF EMPEROR CHARLES CAPTAIN PIZARRO USED HIS LABOUR AND TALENT TO DISCOVER AND PACIFY
United States (President)	1882–present	E PLURIBUS UNUM	OUT OF MANY, ONE
United States (Vice President)	1915–present	E PLURIBUS UNUM	OUT OF MANY, ONE
Kingdom of Uvea	1842–60	A M [abbreviation of "Ave Maria"]	H M [abbreviation of "Hail Mary"]
Republic of Venice	?–1797	PAX TIBI MARCE EVANGELISTA MEUS	PEACE TO YOU MARK MY EVANGELIST
Veneto	1975–present	PAX TIBI MARCE EVANGELISTA MEUS	PEACE TO YOU MARK MY EVANGELIST
Italy (civil ensign)	1947–present	PAX TIBI MARCE EVANGELISTA MEUS	PEACE TO YOU MARK MY EVANGELIST
Virginia	1861–present	SIC SEMPER TYRANNIS	THUS ALWAYS TO TYRANTS
West Vancouver	?–present	CONSILIO ET ANIMIS	BY WISDOM AND COURAGE
West Virginia	1929–present	MONTANI SEMPER LIBERI	MOUNTAINEERS ARE ALWAYS FREE
Winnipeg	1975–present	UNUM CUM VIRTUTE MULTORUM	ONE WITH THE STRENGTH OF MANY
Zacatecas	?–present	LABOR VINCIT OMNIA	WORK CONQUERS ALL

== See also ==
- List of inscribed flags
