= Seal of Cincinnati =

Seal of Cincinnati, Ohio
- Armiger: City of Cincinnati
- Adopted: May 19, 1819
- Crest: Weighing scales, sword, caduceus
- Supporter: None
- Motto: Juncta Juvant
- Use: Municipal flag, official correspondence, insignia of city agencies and institutions

The seal of Cincinnati is the official insignia of the city of Cincinnati, Ohio, in the United States. Adopted in 1819, the seal incorporates scales, a sword, and a caduceus. The seal is featured prominently in the flag of Cincinnati and the insignia of city agencies and institutions.

== Design ==
The seal's design is defined by city ordinance:

The municipal corporation of Cincinnati, in Hamilton county, shall have a seal which shall consist of a center disc, within a circle. The outer circle shall contain the words "City of Cincinnati" above the disc and the word "Ohio" beneath the disc. At a point immediately above the center of the disc, there shall appear the numerals "1788," surmounted by the scales of justice and the words "Juncta Juvant." Below the numerals shall be a representation of a winged rod entwined by two serpents crossed by a sword. The proportional dimensions of the seal shall be according to the official design on file in the council chamber of the city of Cincinnati.

— C.M.C. §104-1

1788 is the year that Mathias Denman, Colonel Robert Patterson, and Israel Ludlow settled present-day Cincinnati. The year is a relatively recent addition; several insignia based on this seal omit the year, including the flag of Cincinnati and the seal of the mayor of Cincinnati, as seen on mayoral proclamations.

The motto Juncta Juvant is a Latin phrase variously translated as "unity assists", "strength in unity", "together we assist", "united they aid each other", or "together they strive". It derives from the legal principle, quae non valeant singula, juncta juvant ("What is without value on its own, helps when joined"). Two of the elements in the seal are associated with Lady Justice: the scales represent justice, while the sword represents authority and power. The caduceus is the traditional symbol of commerce; its serpents represent wisdom.

Though the city ordinance defining the seal does not specify any colors, the seal is traditionally colored blue and white, and a separate ordinance defining the city flag specifies these colors as well.

== History ==
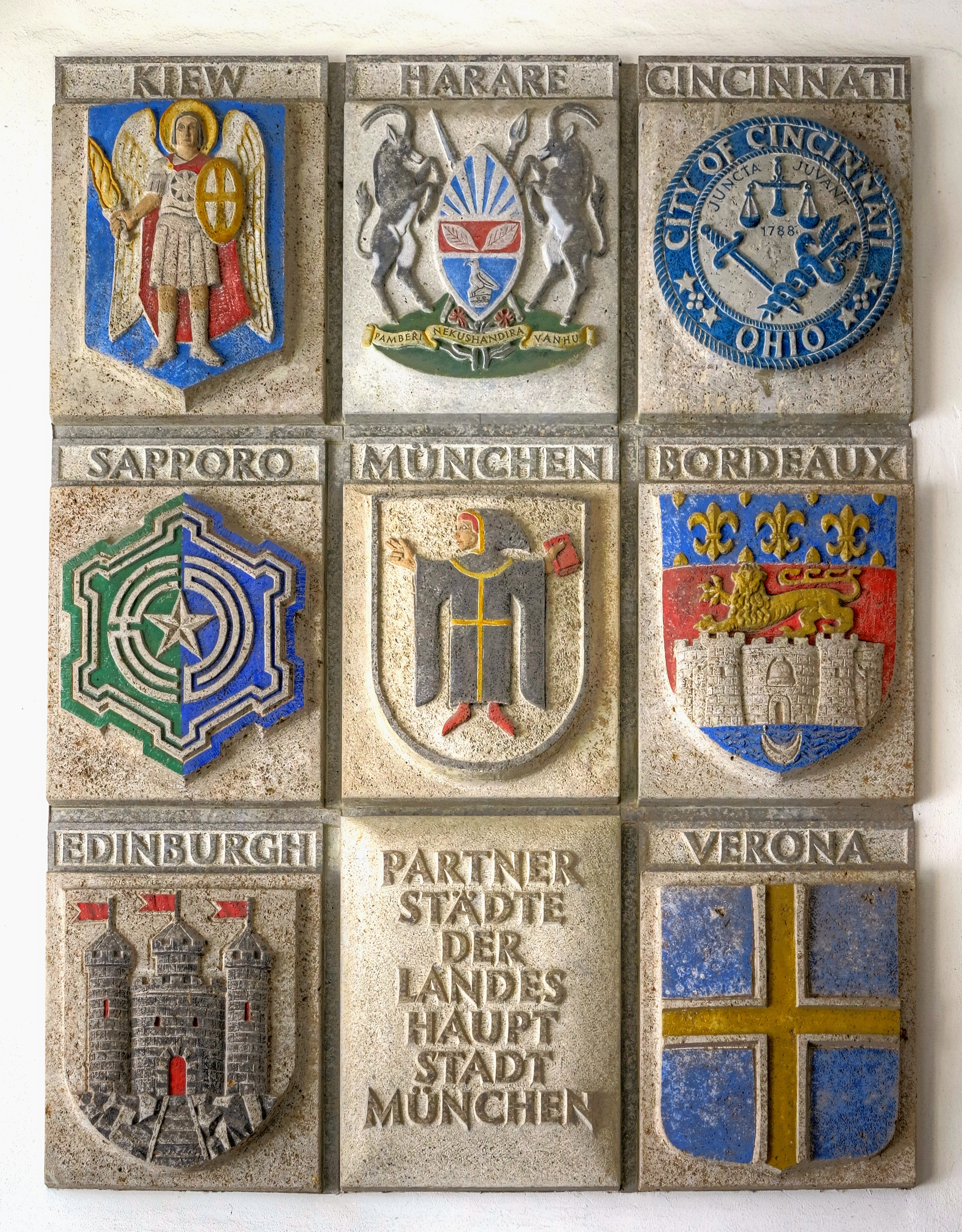
The seal of Cincinnati is on display in the New Town Hall of Munich, one of Cincinnati's sister cities.

The 1802 act granting Cincinnati its first town charter included a provision for a corporate seal. The first town seal was adopted in a town council meeting on July 17, 1802. It was made of copper and bore the following design:

Cincinnatus, with the word engraved above his head in a circular manner; a plow, sheaf of wheat, bee-hive, and rising sun, with an inscription around the edge, and near the extremity thereof these words, to wit: Corporation of the town of Cincinnati, and with the numeral letters, MDCCCII.

The sun and agricultural implements were common in seals around the time of Ohio's statehood. After Cincinnati received its second town charter in 1815, the town council readopted the 1802 seal. On April 10, 1815, the town council adopted the recommendation of Oliver M. Spencer, Jacob Burnet, and Joseph Warren, adopting the council's seal as the town's corporate seal, replacing "1802" with "1815".

On May 19, 1819, shortly after being reincorporated as a city, Cincinnati adopted the current seal with minor differences. (Note: The Cincinnati Enquirer in 1936 credited "a committee appointed by Mayor Nicholas Longworth" with preparing the seal. However, while Longworth was a member of the town council, he never served as council president or mayor.) A flag by Emil Rothengatter that incorporates the seal was adopted as Cincinnati's municipal flag unofficially in 1896 and officially in 1940. The year of settlement "1788" was added sometime between 1945 and 1983. It does not appear on the municipal flag.

On December 15, 1967, state law for the first time required all municipalities in the state to adopt the state seal as their own corporate seal. However, the act contained a grandfather clause exempting existing seals, including Cincinnati's.

== Usage ==
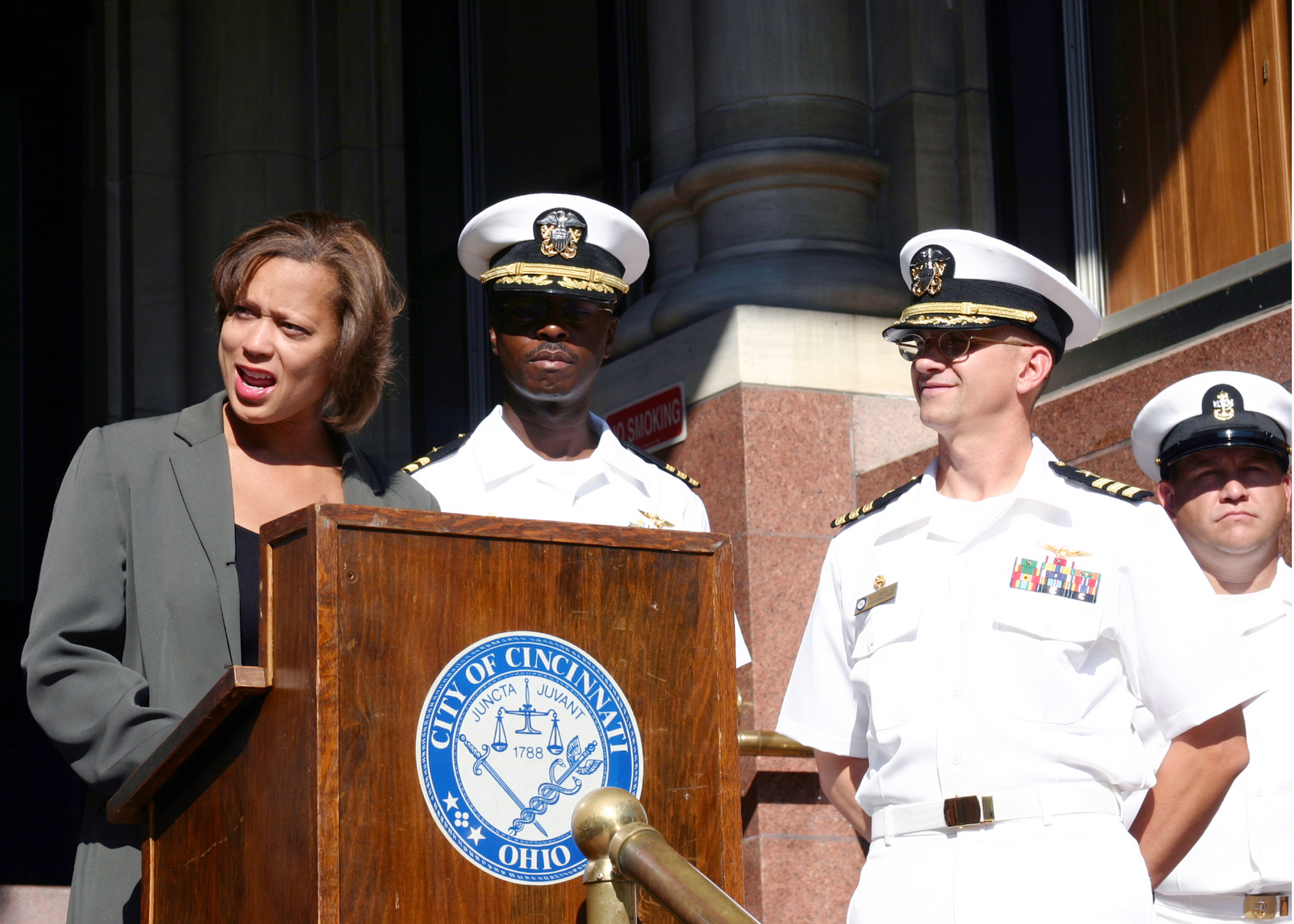
Councilmember Laketa Cole and Navy officers at a ceremony in front of City Hall. The city seal is used in formal contexts, such as on lecterns.

The seal appeared on most city vehicles, signs, and letterheads until 2009, when the city adopted a distinct logo by Cincinnati-based Libby, Perszyk, Kathman. The city continues to use the seal on some official documents. The seal appears above the entrances to several historic public buildings, including City Hall and the old Water Works building.

The coat of arms is found on the flag of Cincinnati. It has also been incorporated into the University of Cincinnati's seal and the Cincinnati Police Department's badge, as well as the police department's unofficial flag. The original seal of the Cincinnati Public Library incorporated the municipal seal, surmounted by two hands exchanging a candle.

Fort Wayne, Indiana, adopted a nearly identical seal, designed by mayor Franklin P. Randall, in 1858. Instead of "1788" and the motto Juncta Juvant, this seal bears the name "Ke-ki-on-ga", a reference to the former Miami capital that was located at present-day Fort Wayne.

Flag of Cincinnati

Seal of the University of Cincinnati

Seal of Fort Wayne, Indiana
