= Benetka Road Covered Bridge =

Benetka Road Bridge
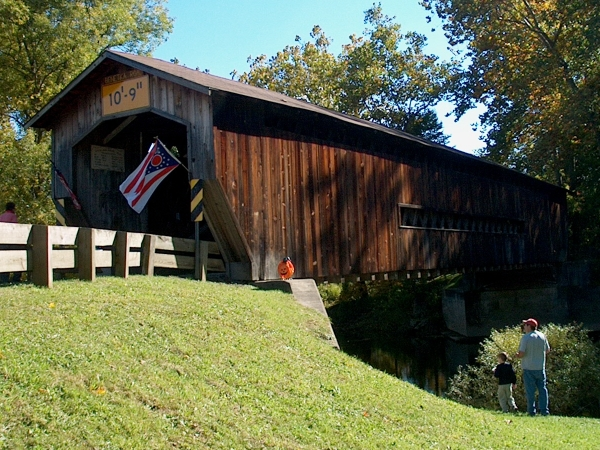
- Coordinates: 41°50′55″N 80°41′21″W
- Locale: Ashtabula County, Ohio, United States

Characteristics
- Design: single span, Town truss with arch
- Total length: 115 feet (35.1 m)

History
- Construction start: ca 1900

Location
- Interactive map of Benetka Road Bridge

Benetka Road Bridge is a covered bridge spanning the Ashtabula River in Ashtabula County, Ohio, United States. The bridge, one of currently 17 drivable bridges in the county, is a single span Town truss design, with laminated arches being added during its renovation in 1985. The bridge’s WGCB number is 35-04-12, and it is located approximately 4 mi (6.4 km) south of North Kingsville.

== History ==
- ca 1900 – Bridge constructed.
- 1985 – Bridge rehabilitated; laminated arches added.

The bridge is located in Sheffield and was first known as East Matherson, named after Samuel Mather. John Greggs, the first Justice of the Peace, gave it the name of Sheffield. In the mid-19th century a water powered saw, grist and flour mill was located by this site.

== Dimensions ==
- Length: 115 feet (35.1 m)
- Overhead clearance: 10 feet 9 inches (3.3 m)

== See also ==
- List of Ashtabula County covered bridges
