= Ohio Revised Code =

Reference of current statutes of the Ohio General Assembly

The Ohio Revised Code (ORC) contains all current statutes of the Ohio General Assembly of a permanent and general nature, consolidated into provisions, titles, chapters and sections. However, the only official publication of the enactments of the General Assembly is the Laws of Ohio; the Ohio Revised Code is only a reference.

The Ohio Revised Code is not officially printed, but there are several unofficial but certified (by the Ohio Secretary of State) commercial publications: Baldwin's Ohio Revised Code Annotated and Page's Ohio Revised Code Annotated are annotated, while Anderson's Ohio Revised Code Unannotated is not. Baldwin's is available online from Westlaw and Page's is available online from LexisNexis. The state also publishes the full contents of the ORC online. Users can request a real-time, certified download of any particular page: a PDF generates with a seal certifying its authenticity.

== History ==
The Ohio Revised Code replaced the Ohio General Code in 1953. However the current organization and form of the Ohio Revised Code Title 29 (Crimes) was completely re-written and issued into law by the General Assembly in 1974.

== Ohio law ==
The Constitution of Ohio is the foremost source of state law. Legislation is enacted by the Ohio General Assembly, published in the Laws of Ohio, and codified in the Ohio Revised Code. State agencies promulgate rules and regulations (sometimes called administrative law) in the Register of Ohio, which are in turn codified in the Ohio Administrative Code (OAC). Ohio's legal system is based on common law, which is interpreted by case law through the decisions of the Ohio Supreme Court, Ohio District Courts of Appeals, and trial courts, which are published in the Ohio Official Reports. Counties, townships, and municipalities may also promulgate local ordinances or resolutions.

== Organization ==
OHIO REVISED CODE GENERAL PROVISIONS
TITLE I STATE GOVERNMENT
TITLE III COUNTIES
TITLE V TOWNSHIPS
TITLE VII MUNICIPAL CORPORATIONS
TITLE IX AGRICULTURE - ANIMALS - FENCES
TITLE XI FINANCIAL INSTITUTIONS
TITLE XIII COMMERCIAL TRANSACTIONS - OHIO UNIFORM COMMERCIAL CODE
TITLE XV CONSERVATION OF NATURAL RESOURCES
TITLE XVII CORPORATIONS - PARTNERSHIPS
TITLE XIX COURTS - MUNICIPAL - MAYOR'S - COUNTY
TITLE XXI COURTS - PROBATE - JUVENILE
TITLE XXIII COURTS - COMMON PLEAS
TITLE XXV COURTS - APPELLATE
TITLE XXVII COURTS - GENERAL PROVISIONS - SPECIAL REMEDIES
TITLE XXIX CRIMES - PROCEDURE
TITLE XXXI DOMESTIC RELATIONS - CHILDREN
TITLE XXXIII EDUCATION - LIBRARIES
TITLE XXXV ELECTIONS
TITLE XXXVII HEALTH - SAFETY - MORALS
TITLE XXXIX INSURANCE
TITLE XLI LABOR AND INDUSTRY
TITLE XLIII LIQUOR
TITLE XLV MOTOR VEHICLES - AERONAUTICS - WATERCRAFT
TITLE XLVII OCCUPATIONS - PROFESSIONS
TITLE XLIX PUBLIC UTILITIES
TITLE LI PUBLIC WELFARE
TITLE LIII REAL PROPERTY
TITLE LV ROADS - HIGHWAYS - BRIDGES
TITLE LVII TAXATION
TITLE LIX VETERANS - MILITARY AFFAIRS
TITLE LXI WATER SUPPLY - SANITATION - DITCHES
TITLE LXIII WORKFORCE DEVELOPMENT

== See also ==
- United States Code
