= Flag of Cincinnati =

Cincinnati, Ohio
- Use: Civil flag
- Proportion: 2:3
- Adopted: 1940 (unofficially in 1896)
- Designed by: Emil Rothengatter

The flag of Cincinnati, Ohio, was selected in an 1896 contest. It was formally adopted on June 15, 1940.

== Design ==
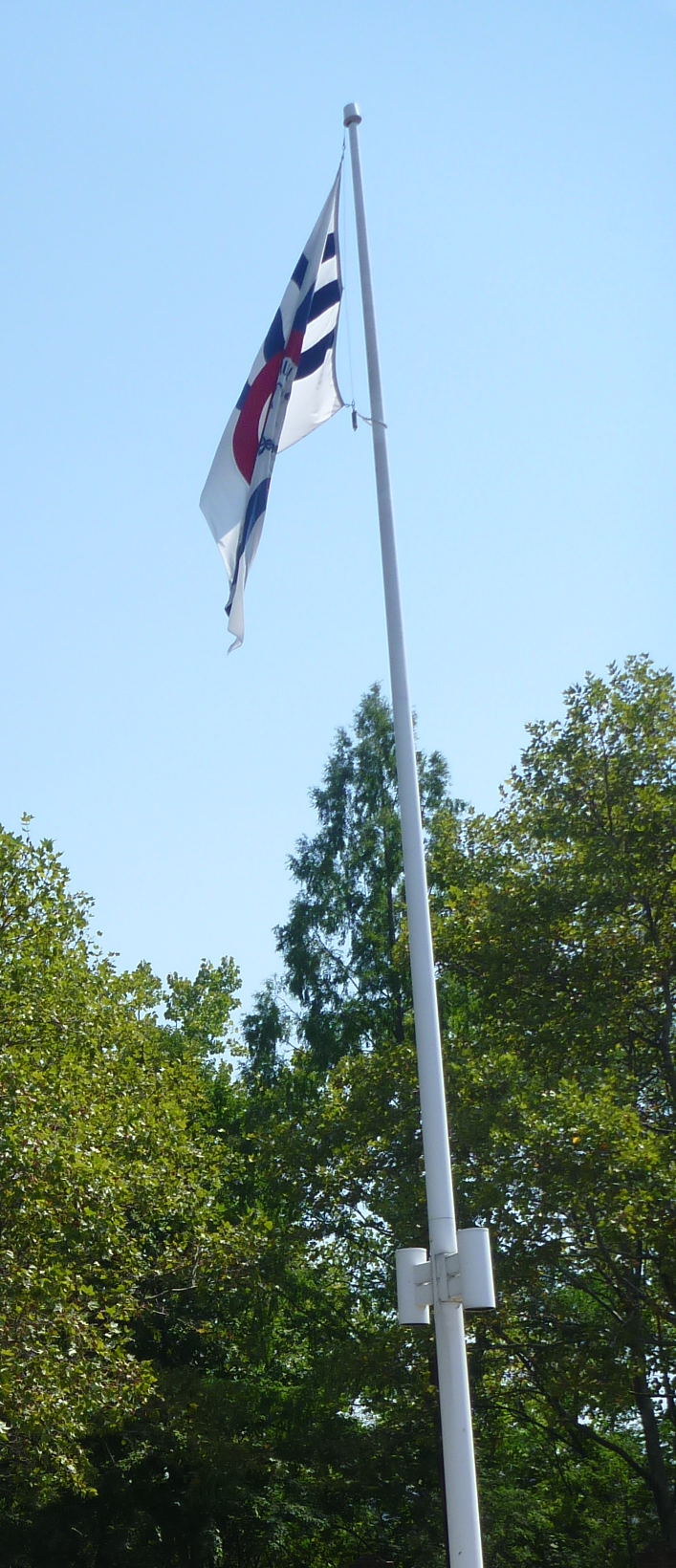
A Cincinnati flag flies above Sawyer Point.

The Cincinnati city flag is defined by city ordinance:

The flag of Cincinnati shall be rectangular in shape. It shall have a white groundwork. In the center shall be a red letter "C". Extending horizontally from either side of the letter "C" shall be three wavy parallel lines of navy blue. Within the letter "C" shall be the seal of the city of Cincinnati in blue. Extending upward from a point at the top of the letter "C" and spaced equally from its center line shall be a cluster of five buckeye leaves in red. The proportional dimensions of the flag and of its various parts shall be according to the official design thereof on file in the council chamber of the city of Cincinnati.

— C.M.C. §104-3

The blue waves represent the Ohio River, upon which the city was founded. The red "C" in the center stands for Cincinnati and a red buckeye leaf rests atop the letter to symbolize the State of Ohio. The center of the C features the seal of Cincinnati as it was at the flag's introduction in 1896.

== History ==
On November 23, 1895, The Cincinnati Times-Star ran an editorial proposing a contest to choose a flag for the city, offering a $50 prize (equivalent to $1,935 in 2025). Mayor John A. Caldwell appointed a Flag Commission to judge submissions. At least 50 designs were submitted by local artists, but only four won conditional approval. Many designs were rejected for being too elaborate or for symbolizing the Queen City with a crown, a device the mayor considered inappropriate for a U.S. city. On January 24, 1896, the commission awarded the $50 to "Zero of Burnet Woods", Emil Rothengatter (1848–1939), for the design that is in use today. A German immigrant, Rothengatter was a foreman at Russell Morgan Lithographing Company and an influential designer of circus posters during the heyday of that genre.

The Enquirer, the Times-Star's commercial and political rival, registered vehement opposition to the proposed flag. Editorials and interviewees protested that any local flag would compete with the Stars and Stripes and even replace it in some contexts. However, Mayor Caldwell was careful to describe the flag as a mere logo to advertise the city. There was also concern that Cincinnati would be unable to protect the flag's design from misuse. Cleveland had recently adopted a municipal flag, only to see it immediately trademarked by a cigar manufacturer; the Enquirer warned that a brewery intended to do likewise in Cincinnati. It was unknown whether a municipal government could secure a copyright for its flag. For its part, the Cleveland Plain Dealer dismissed the flag as a "garter".

A fact that went unreported in the Enquirer was that, on the day of the flag's selection, the Times-Star editor, Rep. Charles Phelps Taft, had Congress grant the city exclusive rights to the design. Nevertheless, the city council (known then as the Board of Legislature) voted down a measure that would have made the flag official. There was still some measure of support for the flag: within the month, Reds manager Frank Bancroft ordered a set for League Park. By 1902, one author noted that the flag had in fact become quite popular. The Cincinnati Chamber of Commerce adopted a resolution calling upon the city to adopt the flag officially. However, city officials contended that the 1896 Congressional resolution made any city ordinance unnecessary. In 1926, they discovered with embarrassment that they had no replicas of the Queen City's flag on hand as they prepared for a visit from Marie of Romania. In 1936, the city erected two flag poles on either end of Fountain Square and originally planned to fly an American flag from each. However, the double flag display was considered a violation of flag etiquette, so the city's flag was flown from one of the flagpoles. On days that a traffic fatality occurred within the city, a "black flag of death" took the place of the city flag.

A variant of the flag featuring the colors of FC Cincinnati

The municipal flag would not be formally adopted until June 15, 1940, as City Ordinance 181-1940, upon the suggestion of Mayor James Garfield Stewart. The ordinance was originally codified as C.O. 104-2, then renumbered as C.M.C. 104-3 on January 1, 1972.

In a 2004 poll on the North American Vexillological Association website, Cincinnati's flag was voted the 22nd best design among 150 U.S. city flags and the best city flag in Ohio. In 2016, fans of the soccer club FC Cincinnati began using blue and orange variants of the flag to show support for the team.

== See also ==
- List of flags with Latin-language text
- Flag of the Roman Catholic Archdiocese of Cincinnati
