= Flag of Cleveland =

City of Cleveland
- Use: Civil flag
- Proportion: 2:3
- Adopted: October 21, 1895; 131 years ago
- Design: A vertical triband of red (left), white (middle), and blue (right), with a shield in the center with the name "Cleveland" breaking through near the top. The bottom portion of the shield is outlined in red and consists of the year "1796" surrounded by a laurel wreath. The top portion is outlined in blue with symbols representing the city's association with industry and maritime interests. At the bottom is the municipal motto "Progress & Prosperity".
- Designed by: Susan Hepburn

The flag of Cleveland serves as the representative banner of the city of Cleveland, Ohio, United States. Ohio's oldest city flag, it was designed by local art school graduate, Susan Hepburn. The flag was officially adopted as the municipal banner by Cleveland City Council on October 21, 1895, with the ordinance on the flag adopted on February 24, 1896.

== Design and symbolism ==
Cleveland's municipal charter, adopted in 1913, describes the flag as follows:

The Municipal emblem of the City shall be a banner of the following description and design: the banner shall consist of three (3) vertical stripes, of equal width, in color red, white and blue respectively, the red being nearest the standard and the white in the center. The middle stripe shall bear the American shield with the word 'Cleveland,' in blue, across its center, and the figures '1796' in red, at its base, encircled by a laurel wreath. The outline of the lower half of the shield shall be in red and of the upper in blue. In the upper left-hand corner of the shield shall stand an anvil, hammer and wheel, and in the upper right-hand corner an anchor, windlass and oars. Under the shield, in black letters, shall be placed the words 'Progress and Prosperity.'

Both the colors and the use of the American shield represent patriotism. 1796 is the year in which Cleveland was founded by General Moses Cleaveland. The anvil, hammer, and wheel represent industry and manufacturing, while the anchor, windlass (alternatively, capstan), and oars represent the city's status as a major port on the Great Lakes. The municipal motto, "Progress and Prosperity", refers to the rapid growth that Cleveland experienced in the period of the flag's adoption.

== History ==
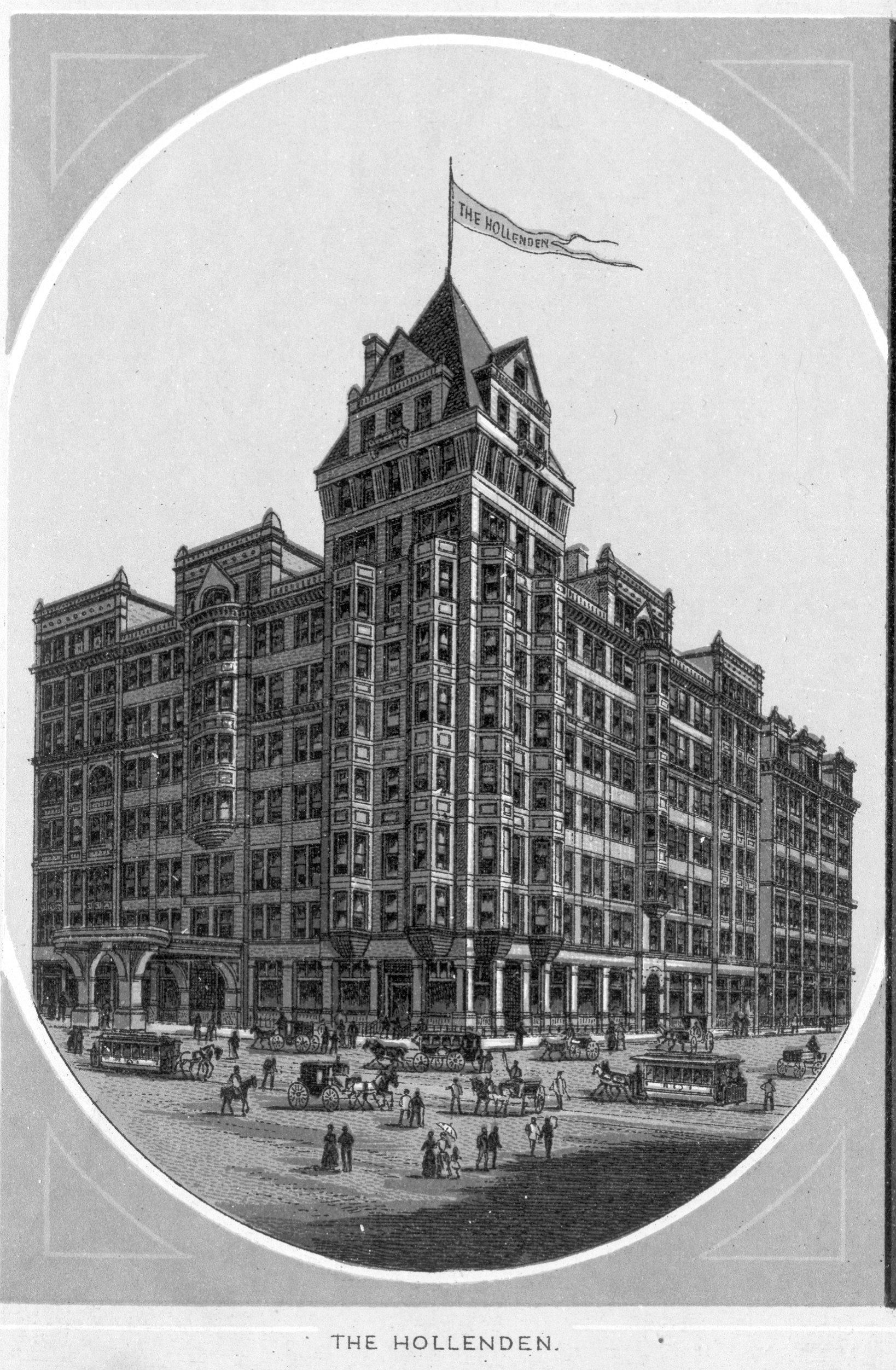
Hollenden Hotel, Cleveland

The idea for a Cleveland flag was first proposed by New York journalist Julian Ralph in an interview at the Hollenden Hotel with Plain Dealer reporter William Stokely Lloydon on April 24, 1895. Elaborating on the idea, Ralph stated:

Let us make our citizens proud of the virtues of our cities. Let us make them jealous of the political reputation of our cities. Let us cause them to be intent upon good government and upon maintaining it. One way to do this is to fly the city flag over their heads.

The proposal was positively received by both city leaders and the public, and it sparked a contest to design a new flag in advance of the city's centenary sponsored by The Plain Dealer. The selection committee was chaired by Ohio artist Archibald Willard, best known for the famous Spirit of '76. More than two dozen entries were submitted, and several were published in The Plain Dealer. These included proposals with municipal seals featuring the Columbia-like goddess of liberty in classical Greek dress, accompanied by Latin mottos.

The contest winner was Susan Hepburn, an 18-year-old art school graduate and a descendant of American settlers of the Connecticut Western Reserve. The selection committee praised her design for its "power and simplicity." Robert Beach, the Plain Dealer reporter who delivered the prize to Hepburn, later became her husband. Some Clevelanders opposed the adoption of any municipal flag, fearing that it would compete with the flag of the United States.

There was some confusion about what "official adoption" meant in practice, since at the time there was no legal precedent on the matter, and the only city in the United States to officially adopt the flag was Philadelphia. A Cleveland cigar manufacturer tried to take advantage of this uncertainty to quickly register the design as its own trademark.

On October 21, 1895, the flag was approved by Cleveland City Council. The city's flag committee later resolved to add a municipal motto to the design on October 25. Although the Latin motto "Major et Melior" (Greater and Better) was originally favored by city leaders, Mayor Robert McKisson instead advocated the English motto "Unity and Progress", which eventually became "Progress and Prosperity". Mayor McKisson announced that it would be added to the flag on November 13, 1895. An ordinance was put in place on the banner on February 24, 1896, the year in which Cleveland celebrated its centennial. The adoption of the Cleveland flag inspired Cincinnati to adopt a flag of its own.

== People's Flag ==
People's Flag of Cleveland

On March 7, 2025, a local group adopted a People's Flag of Cleveland. The People's Flag originated in an unsuccessful effort to redesign the official city flag in 2024. After the idea of changing the official flag was declined by Cleveland City Council, the design was launched as an unofficial People's Flag of Cleveland. The design selections were reviewed by a committee and their top three designs were opened to an online vote. Shan Rodich of Aurora, Ohio was the creator of the winning design.

=== Symbolism ===
The prominent "C" represents Cleveland at the heart of the design and the blue color of the "C" represents the Cuyahoga River. The red stripe, created by the curve of the "C" and inset of the six-pointed star, nods to Cleveland's Sixth City nickname. The swallowtail shape reflects Ohio's flag shape and progress. The blue field symbolizes Lake Erie. The six-pointed star is a nod to the six images on the original flag referring the city's industry, manufacturing, and its position as a major port of the Great Lakes.

=== Finalists ===
Option 1 - The winning design

Option 2

Option 3

Option 4 - The official municipal flag

== Works cited ==
- Rose, William Ganson (1990). Cleveland: The Making of a City. Kent, OH: Kent State University Press. ISBN 978-0873384285.
