= Index of Ohio-related articles =

The location of the state of Ohio in the United States of America

The following is an alphabetical list of articles related to the U.S. state of Ohio.

== 0–9 ==
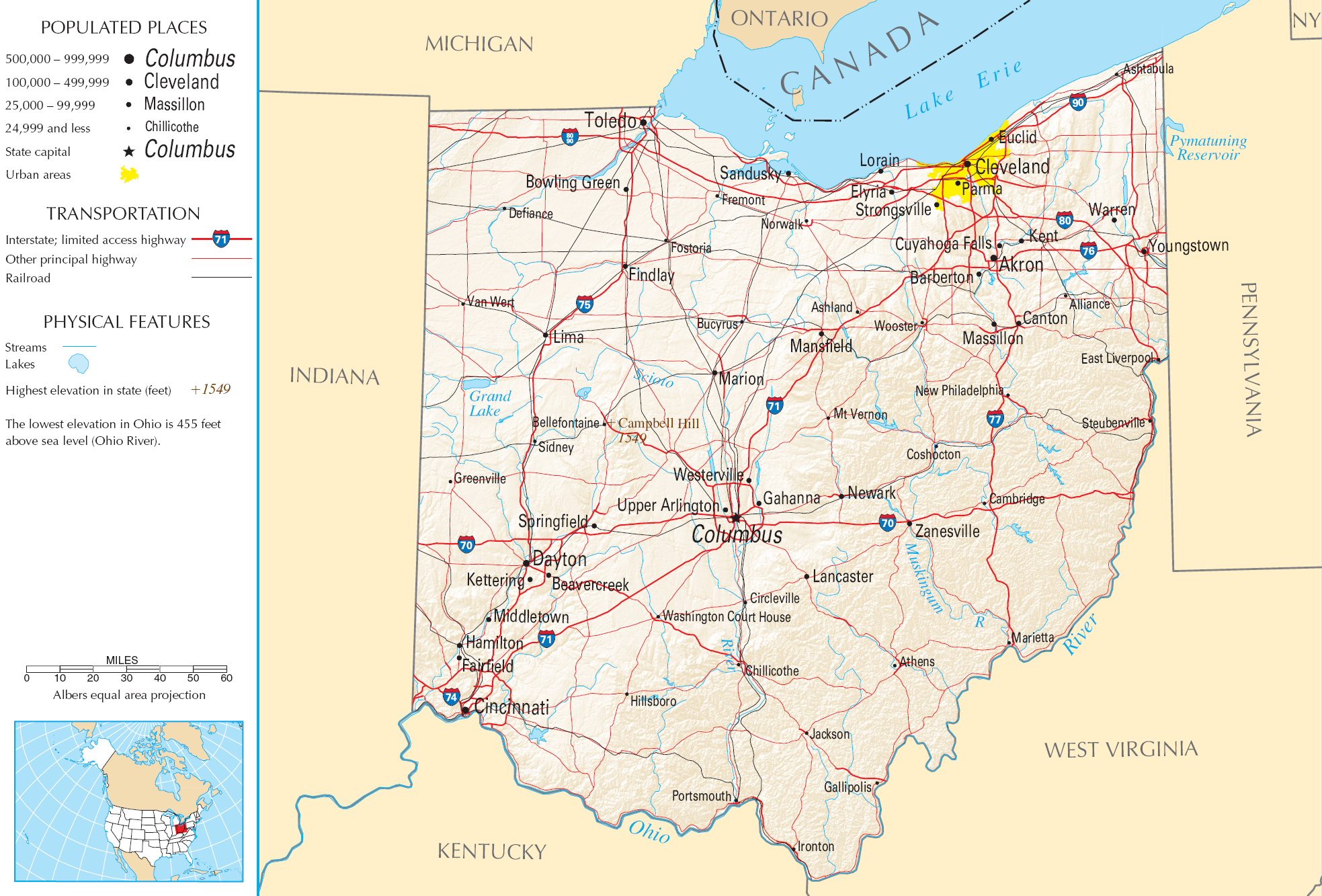
An enlargeable map of the state of Ohio

- .oh.us – Internet second-level domain for the state of Ohio
- 17th state to join the United States of America

== A ==
- Adjacent states:
  - Commonwealth of Kentucky
  - Commonwealth of Pennsylvania
  - Province of Ontario
  - State of Indiana
  - State of Michigan
  - State of West Virginia
- Agriculture in Ohio
- Airports in Ohio
- Amusement parks in Ohio
  - Category:Amusement parks in Ohio
- Appalachia
- Arboreta in Ohio
  - commons:Category:Arboreta in Ohio
- Archaeology of Ohio
  - Category:Archaeological sites in Ohio
    - commons:Category:Archaeological sites in Ohio
- Architecture of Ohio
- Art museums and galleries in Ohio
  - commons:Category:Art museums and galleries in Ohio
- Astronomical observatories in Ohio
  - commons:Category:Astronomical observatories in Ohio
- Attorney General of the State of Ohio

== B ==
- Battle of Buffington Island
- Battle of Chillicothe
- Battle of the Cumberland Gap (1863)
- Battle of Fort Stephenson
- Battle of Lake Erie
- Battle of Piqua
- Battle of Salineville
- Botanical gardens in Ohio
  - commons:Category:Botanical gardens in Ohio
- Buildings and structures in Ohio
  - commons:Category:Buildings and structures in Ohio

== C ==
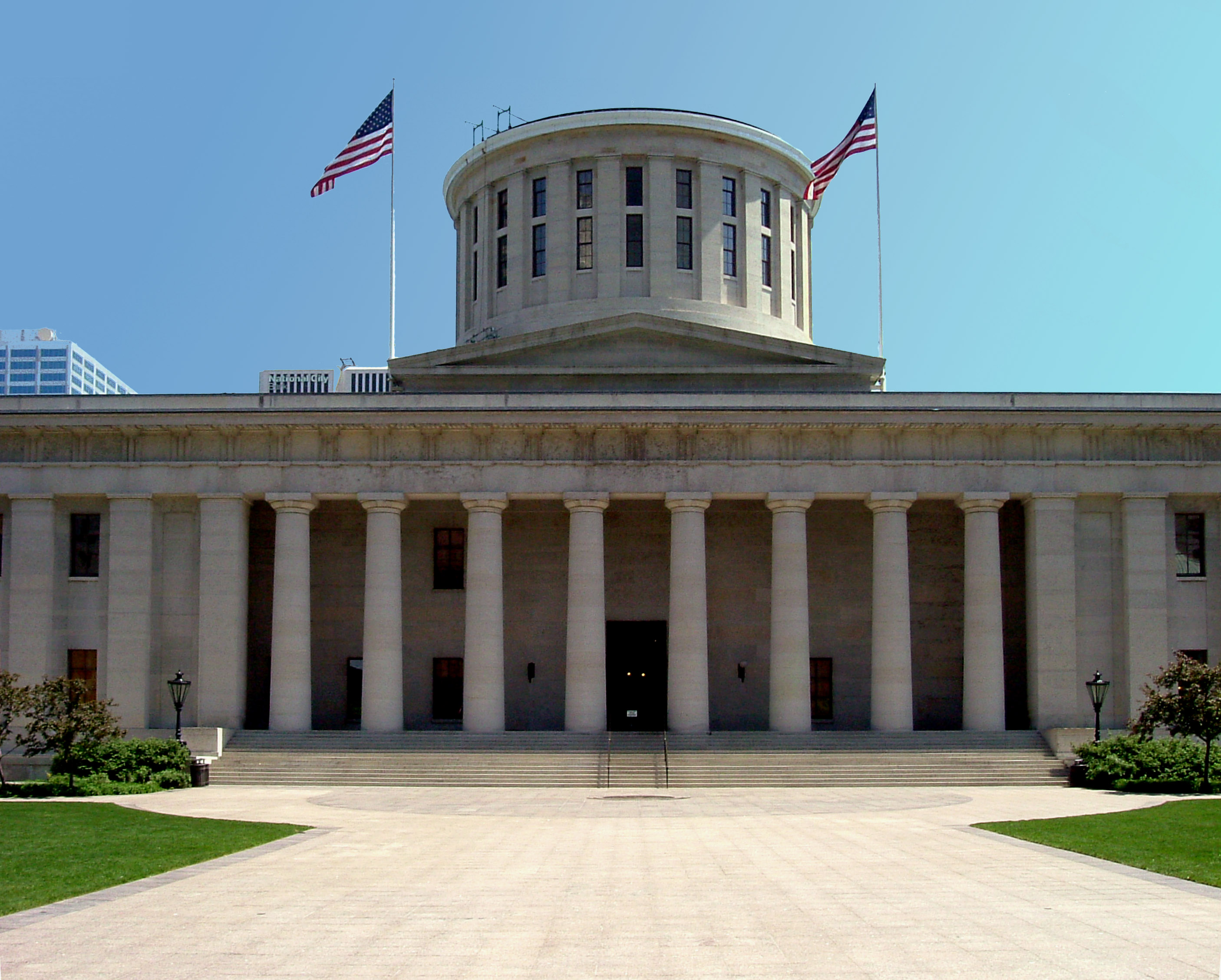
The Ohio Statehouse in Columbus

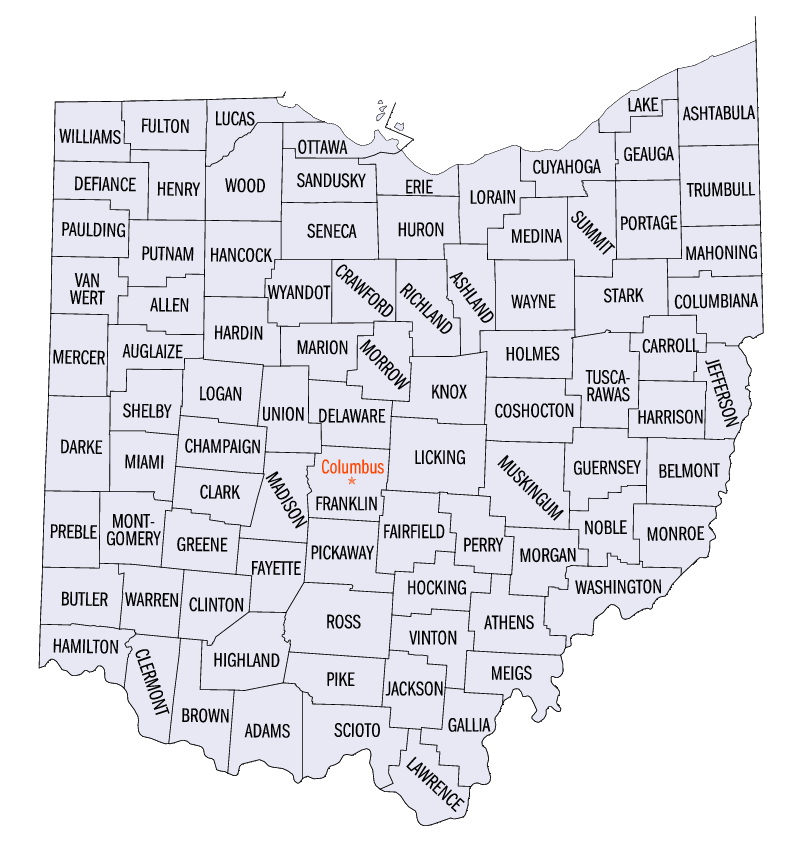
An enlargeable map of the 88 counties of the State of Ohio

- Capital of the State of Ohio
- Capitol of the State of Ohio
  - commons:Category:Ohio State Capitol
- Caves of Ohio
  - commons:Category:Caves of Ohio*Census statistical areas of Ohio
- Cedar Point
- Charlotina
- Carroll Meadows Golf Course
- Chillicothe, capital of the Territory Northwest of the River Ohio 1800–1803, capital of the State of Ohio 1803–1810 and 1812–1816
- Cincinnati, Ohio
- Cities in Ohio
  - commons:Category:Cities in Ohio
- Citizens for Sunshine
- Civil War Ohio
  - Civil War generals from Ohio
  - Civil War units from Ohio
  - Cincinnati in the Civil War
  - Cleveland in the Civil War
- Cleveland, Ohio
- Climate of Ohio
  - Category:Climate of Ohio
    - commons:Category:Climate of Ohio
- Colleges and universities in Ohio
  - commons:Category:Universities and colleges in Ohio
- Columbus, Ohio, state capital since 1816
- Communications in Ohio
  - commons:Category:Communications in Ohio
- Companies in Ohio
- Congressional districts of Ohio
- Constitution of the State of Ohio
- Convention centers in Ohio
  - commons:Category:Convention centers in Ohio
- Counties of the State of Ohio
  - commons:Category:Counties in Ohio
- Covered bridges
- Crescent Machine Company
- Culture of Ohio
  - commons:Category:Ohio culture

== D ==
- Demographics of Ohio
- Dayton, Ohio

== E ==
- Economy of Ohio
  - Category:Economy of Ohio
    - commons:Category:Economy of Ohio
- Education in Ohio
  - Category:Education in Ohio
    - commons:Category:Education in Ohio
- Elections in Ohio
  - Category:Elections in Ohio
    - commons:Category:Elections in Ohio
- Electoral reform in Ohio
- Category:Environment of Ohio
  - commons:Category:Environment of Ohio

== F ==
The Flag of the State of Ohio

- Festivals in Ohio
  - commons:Category:Festivals in Ohio
- Flag of the State of Ohio
- Forts in Ohio
  - Category:Forts in Ohio
  - commons:Category:Forts in Ohio

== G ==
The Great Seal of the State of Ohio

- Gardens in Ohio
  - commons:Category:Gardens in Ohio
- Geography of Ohio
  - Category:Geography of Ohio
    - commons:Category:Geography of Ohio
- Geology of Ohio
  - commons:Category:Geology of Ohio
- Ghost towns in Ohio
  - Category:Ghost towns in Ohio
    - commons:Category:Ghost towns in Ohio
- Golf clubs and courses in Ohio
- Government of the State of Ohio website
  - Category:Government of Ohio
    - commons:Category:Government of Ohio
- Governor of the State of Ohio
  - List of governors of Ohio
- Great Seal of the State of Ohio

== H ==
- High schools of Ohio
- Higher education in Ohio
- Highway routes in Ohio
- Hiking trails in Ohio
  - commons:Category:Hiking trails in Ohio
- History of Ohio
  - Indigenous peoples
  - French colony of la Louisiane, 1699–1763
    - French and Indian War, 1754–1763
      - Treaty of Paris of 1763
  - British (though predominantly Francophone) Province of Quebec, (1763–1783)-1791
  - American Revolutionary War, 1775–1783
    - United States Declaration of Independence of 1776
    - Treaty of Paris of 1783
  - Unorganized territory of the United States, 1783–1787
    - Northwest Indian War, 1785–1795
      - Battle of Fallen Timbers, 1794
      - Treaty of Greenville, 1795
  - Territory Northwest of the River Ohio, 1787–1803
    - Connecticut Western Reserve, 1776–1800
  - State of Ohio, since 1803
    - War of 1812, 1812–1815
      - Battle of Lake Erie, 1813
    - Ohio in the American Civil War, 1861–1865
  - Category:History of Ohio
    - commons:Category:History of Ohio
- Hospitals in Ohio
- House of Representatives of the State of Ohio

== I ==
- Images of Ohio
  - commons:Category:Ohio
- Income inequality in Ohio
- Interstate highway routes in Ohio
- Islands of Ohio

== J ==
- Jefferson County, Ohio
- Jefferson, Ohio
- Jefferson, Wayne County, Ohio
- Jeffersonville, Ohio
- Joshua Reed Giddings
- Joshua Reed Giddings Law Office

== K ==
- Kings Island

== L ==
- Lakes in Ohio
  - Lake Erie
  - Category:Lakes of Ohio
    - commons:Category:Lakes of Ohio
- Landmarks in Ohio
  - commons:Category:Landmarks in Ohio
- Lieutenant Governor of the State of Ohio
- Lists related to the State of Ohio:
  - List of airports in Ohio
  - List of census statistical areas in Ohio
  - List of cities in Ohio
  - List of colleges and universities in Ohio
  - List of counties in Ohio
  - List of covered bridges in Ohio
  - List of forts in Ohio
  - List of ghost towns in Ohio
  - List of governors of Ohio
  - List of high schools in Ohio
  - List of highway routes in Ohio
  - List of hospitals in Ohio
  - List of individuals executed in Ohio
  - List of Interstate highway routes in Ohio
  - List of islands of Ohio
  - List of lakes in Ohio
  - List of law enforcement agencies in Ohio
  - List of museums in Ohio
  - List of National Historic Landmarks in Ohio
  - List of newspapers in Ohio
  - List of people from Ohio
  - List of radio stations in Ohio
  - List of railroads in Ohio
  - List of Registered Historic Places in Ohio
  - List of rivers of Ohio
  - List of school districts in Ohio
  - List of state forests in Ohio
  - List of state highway routes in Ohio
  - List of state parks in Ohio
  - List of state prisons in Ohio
  - List of symbols of the State of Ohio
  - List of television stations in Ohio
  - List of Ohio's congressional delegations
  - List of United States congressional districts in Ohio
  - List of United States representatives from Ohio
  - List of United States senators from Ohio
  - List of U.S. highway routes in Ohio

== M ==
- Maps of Ohio
  - commons:Category:Maps of Ohio
- Marietta, capital of the Territory Northwest of the River Ohio 1788–1800
- Mass media in Ohio
- Monuments and memorials in Ohio
  - commons:Category:Monuments and memorials in Ohio
- Mountains of Ohio
  - commons:Category:Mountains of Ohio
- Museums in Ohio
  - Category:Museums in Ohio
  - commons:Category:Museums in Ohio
- Music of Ohio
  - commons:Category:Music of Ohio
  - Category:Musical groups from Ohio
  - Category:Musicians from Ohio

== N ==
- National forests of Ohio
  - commons:Category:National Forests of Ohio
- Natural arches of Ohio
  - commons:Category:Natural arches of Ohio
- Natural history of Ohio
  - commons:Category:Natural history of Ohio
- Nature centers in Ohio
  - commons:Category:Nature centers in Ohio
- Newspapers of Ohio
- Northwest Territory

== O ==
- OH – United States Postal Service postal code for the State of Ohio
- Ohio website
  - Category:Ohio
    - commons:Category:Ohio
      - commons:Category:Maps of Ohio
- Ohio Alliance for Public Charter Schools
- Ohio Automated Rx Reporting System
- Ohio Business Development Coalition
- Ohio Commission on Dispute Resolution and Conflict Management
- Ohio estate tax
- Ohio House (Philadelphia)
- Ohio in the Civil War
- Ohio National Organization for Women
- Ohio River
- Ohio State Highway Patrol
- Ohio Statehouse
- Ohio Youth Problems, Functioning and Satisfaction Scales (Ohio scales)
- Outdoor sculptures in Ohio
  - commons:Category:Outdoor sculptures in Ohio

== P ==
- People from Ohio
  - Category:People from Ohio
    - commons:Category:People from Ohio
    - Category:People from Ohio by populated place
    - Category:People from Ohio by county
    - Category:People from Ohio by occupation*Politics of Ohio
- Politics of Ohio
  - Category:Politics of Ohio
    - commons:Category:Politics of Ohio
- Protected areas of Ohio
  - Category:Protected areas of Ohio

== Q ==
- Quaker Oats Company

== R ==
- Radio stations in Ohio
- Railroad museums in Ohio
  - commons:Category:Railroad museums in Ohio
- Railroads in Ohio
- Ravenna, Ohio
- Registered historic places in Ohio
  - commons:Category:Registered Historic Places in Ohio
  - Religion in Ohio
    - commons:Category:Religion in Ohio
- Rivers of Ohio
  - Ohio River
  - commons:Category:Rivers of Ohio
- Roller coasters in Ohio
  - commons:Category:Roller coasters in Ohio

== S ==
- The Safety Council of Northwest Ohio
- School districts of Ohio
- Scouting in Ohio
- Secretary of the State of Ohio
- Senate of the State of Ohio
- Settlements in Ohio
  - Cities in Ohio
  - Villages in Ohio
  - Townships in Ohio
  - Census Designated Places in Ohio
  - Other unincorporated communities in Ohio
  - List of ghost towns in Ohio
- Siege of Fort Meigs
- Ski areas and resorts in Ohio
  - commons:Category:Ski areas and resorts in Ohio
- Sports in Ohio
  - Category:Sports in Ohio
    - commons:Category:Sports in Ohio
  - Category:Sports venues in Ohio
    - commons:Category:Sports venues in Ohio
- State highway routes in Ohio
- State of Ohio website
  - Constitution of the State of Ohio
  - Government of the State of Ohio
    - Category:Government of Ohio
      - commons:Category:Government of Ohio
  - Executive branch of the government of the State of Ohio
    - Governor of the State of Ohio
  - Legislative branch of the government of the State of Ohio
    - Legislature of the State of Ohio
      - Senate of the State of Ohio
      - House of Representatives of the State of Ohio
  - Judicial branch of the government of the State of Ohio
    - Supreme Court of the State of Ohio
- State parks of Ohio
  - commons:Category:State parks of Ohio
- State prisons of Ohio
- Structures in Ohio
  - commons:Category:Buildings and structures in Ohio
- Supreme Court of the State of Ohio
- Symbols of the State of Ohio
  - Category:Symbols of Ohio
    - commons:Category:Symbols of Ohio

== T ==
- Telecommunications in Ohio
  - commons:Category:Communications in Ohio
- Telephone area codes in Ohio
- Television shows set in Ohio
- Television stations in Ohio
- Territory Northwest of the River Ohio
- Theatres in Ohio
  - commons:Category:Theatres in Ohio
- Tourism in Ohio website
  - commons:Category:Tourism in Ohio
- Transportation in Ohio
  - Category:Transportation in Ohio
    - commons:Category:Transport in Ohio
- Treasurer of the State of Ohio
- Tri-Rivers Educational Computer Association

== U ==
- United States of America
  - States of the United States of America
  - United States census statistical areas of Ohio
  - Ohio's congressional delegations
  - United States congressional districts in Ohio
  - United States Court of Appeals for the Sixth Circuit
  - United States District Court for the Northern District of Ohio
  - United States District Court for the Southern District of Ohio
  - United States representatives from Ohio
  - United States senators from Ohio
- Universities and colleges in Ohio
  - commons:Category:Universities and colleges in Ohio
- U.S. highway routes in Ohio
- US-OH – ISO 3166-2:US region code for the State of Ohio

== V ==
Vienna Center, Ohio

== W ==
- Water parks in Ohio
  Wikimedia
  - Wikimedia Commons:Category:Ohio
    - commons:Category:Maps of Ohio
  - Wikinews:Category:Ohio
    - Wikinews:Portal:Ohio
  - Wikipedia Category:Ohio
    - Wikipedia Portal:Ohio
    - Wikipedia:WikiProject Ohio
      - Category:WikiProject Ohio articles
      - Category:WikiProject Ohio participants
- Wind power in Ohio

== X ==
- Xavier University

== Y ==
- Yellow Creek, Ohio
- Yellow Creek Township, Columbiana County, Ohio
- Youngstown, Ohio

== Z ==
- Zanesville, Ohio, state capital 1810–1812
- Zoos in Ohio
  - commons:Category:Zoos in Ohio

== See also ==
- Topic overview:
  - Ohio
  - Outline of Ohio
