= Outline of Ohio =

Overview of and topical guide to Ohio

The flag of Ohio

The seal of Ohio

The location of the state of Ohio in the United States of America

The following outline is provided as an overview of and topical guide to the U.S. state of Ohio:

Ohio – seventh most populous of the 50 states of the United States of America. Ohio lies between the Ohio River and Lake Erie in the Midwestern United States.

The United States created the Territory Northwest of the River Ohio on July 13, 1787. Ohio joined the Union as the 17th state effective as of March 1, 1803.

== General reference ==
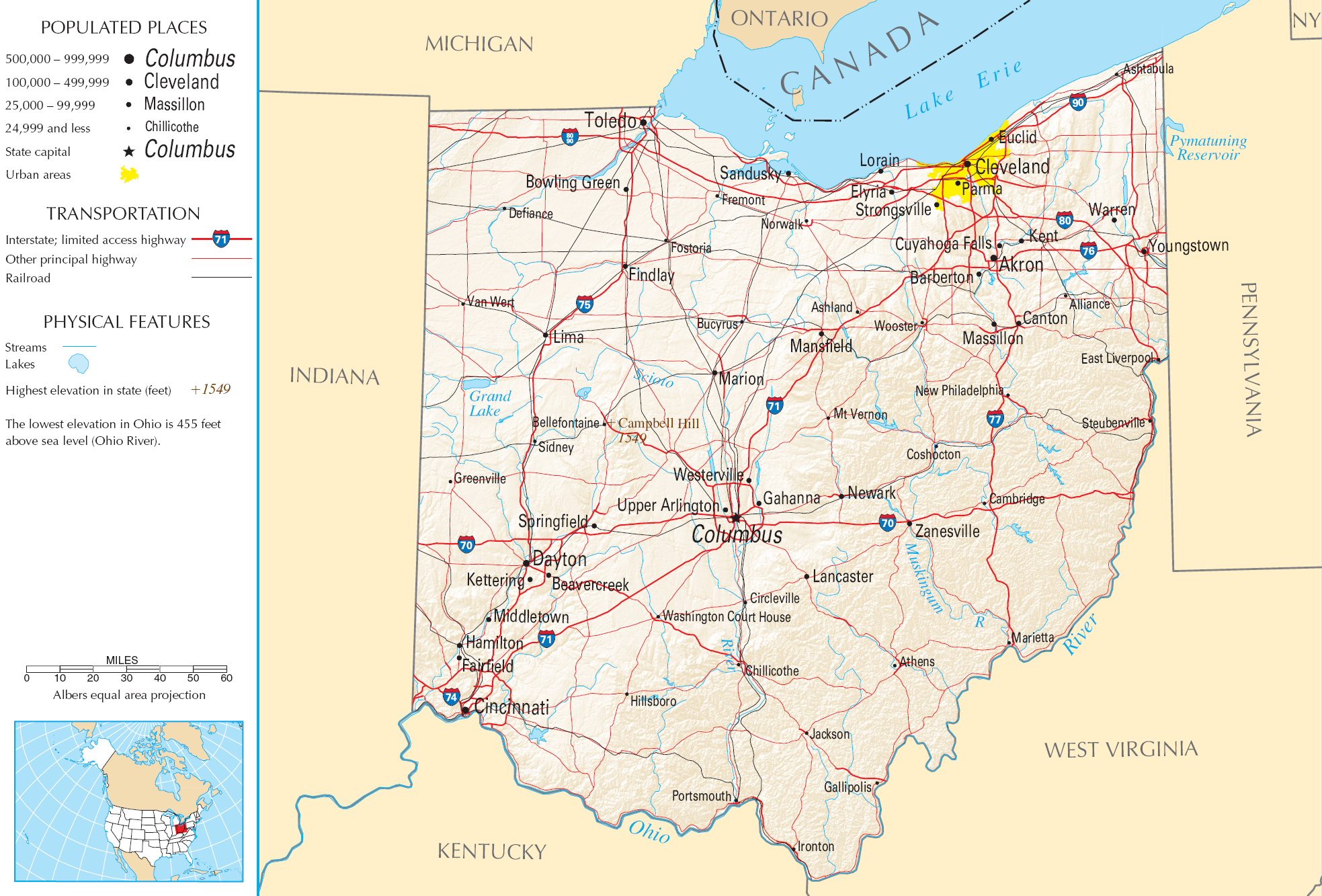
An enlargeable map of the state of Ohio

- Names
  - Common name: Ohio
    - Pronunciation: /oʊˈhaɪ.oʊ/
  - Official name: State of Ohio
  - Abbreviations and name codes
    - Postal symbol: OH
    - ISO 3166-2 code: US-OH
    - Internet second-level domain: .oh.us
  - Nicknames
    - Buckeye State
    - Birthplace of Aviation (currently used on license plates)
    - Mother of Modern Presidents
- Adjectival: Ohio
- Demonyms: Ohioan, Buckeye

== Geography of Ohio ==
Geography of Ohio

- Ohio is: a U.S. state, a federal state of the United States of America
- Location
  - Northern Hemisphere
  - Western Hemisphere
    - Americas
      - North America
        - Anglo America
        - Northern America
          - United States of America
            - Contiguous United States
              - Central United States
                - East North Central States
              - Midwestern United States
          - Great Lakes Region
- Population of Ohio: 11,536,504 (2010 U.S. Census)
- Area of Ohio: 44,825 sq mi (116,100 km^{2})
- Atlas of Ohio

=== Places in Ohio ===
- Historic places in Ohio
  - National Historic Landmarks in Ohio
  - National Register of Historic Places listings in Ohio
    - Bridges on the National Register of Historic Places in Ohio
- National Natural Landmarks in Ohio
- National parks in Ohio
- State parks in Ohio

=== Environment of Ohio ===
- Climate of Ohio
- Protected areas in Ohio
  - State forests of Ohio
- Superfund sites in Ohio
- Wildlife of Ohio
  - Flora of Ohio
  - Fauna of Ohio
    - Birds of Ohio
    - Mammals of Ohio

==== Natural geographic features of Ohio ====
- Lakes of Ohio
- Rivers of Ohio

=== Regions of Ohio ===
- Northwestern Ohio
- Southern Ohio
  - Southeastern Ohio

==== Administrative divisions of Ohio ====
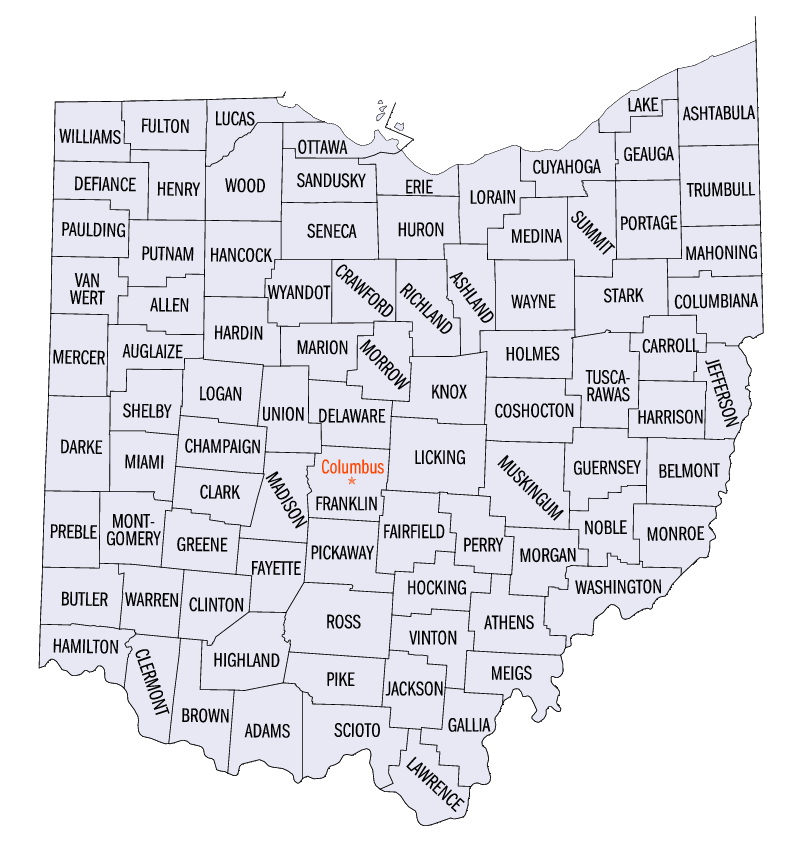
An enlargeable map of the 88 counties of the state of Ohio.

- The 88 counties of the state of Ohio
  - Municipalities in Ohio
    - Cities in Ohio
      - State capital of Ohio: Columbus
      - City nicknames in Ohio
      - Sister cities in Ohio
    - Villages in Ohio
  - Unincorporated communities in Ohio
    - Townships in Ohio

=== Demography of Ohio ===
Demographics of Ohio

== Government and politics of Ohio ==
Politics of Ohio

- Form of government: U.S. state government
- Ohio's congressional delegations
- Ohio State Capitol
- Elections in Ohio
  - Electoral reform in Ohio
- Political party strength in Ohio

=== Branches of the government of Ohio ===
Government of Ohio

==== Executive branch of the government of Ohio ====
- Governor of Ohio
  - Lieutenant Governor of Ohio
  - Secretary of State of Ohio
  - State Treasurer of Ohio
- State departments
  - Ohio Department of Transportation

==== Legislative branch of the government of Ohio ====
- Ohio General Assembly (bicameral)
  - Upper house: Ohio Senate
  - Lower house: Ohio House of Representatives

==== Judicial branch of the government of Ohio ====
Courts of Ohio

- Supreme Court of Ohio

=== Law and order in Ohio ===
Law of Ohio

- Cannabis in Ohio
- Capital punishment in Ohio
  - Individuals executed in Ohio
- Constitution of Ohio
- Crime in Ohio
- Gun laws in Ohio
- Law enforcement in Ohio
  - Law enforcement agencies in Ohio
- Same-sex marriage in Ohio

=== Military in Ohio ===
- Ohio Air National Guard
- Ohio Army National Guard

== History of Ohio ==
History of Ohio

=== History of Ohio, by period ===
- Prehistory of Ohio
- Indigenous peoples
- French colony of la Louisiane, 1699–1763
  - French and Indian War, 1754–1763
    - Treaty of Paris of 1763
- British (though predominantly Francophone) Province of Quebec, (1763–1783)-1791
- American Revolutionary War, April 19, 1775 – September 3, 1783
  - United States Declaration of Independence, July 4, 1776
  - Treaty of Paris, September 3, 1783
  - Unorganized territory of the United States, 1783–1787
  - Northwest Indian War, 1785–1795
    - Battle of Fallen Timbers, 1794
    - Treaty of Greenville, 1795
- Territory Northwest of the River Ohio, 1787–1803
  - The "first forty-eight" found Marietta as the first permanent settlement of the new United States in the Northwest Territory, April 7, 1788
  - Connecticut Western Reserve, 1776–1800
- State of Ohio becomes 17th state admitted to the United States of America on March 1, 1803
  - War of 1812, June 18, 1812 – March 23, 1815
    - Battle of Lake Erie, 1813
    - Treaty of Ghent, December 24, 1814
  - William Henry Harrison becomes ninth President of the United States on March 4, 1841
  - American Civil War, April 12, 1861 – May 13, 1865
    - Ohio in the American Civil War
      - Morgan's Raid, June 11 – July 26, 1863
  - Ulysses S. Grant becomes 18th President of the United States on March 4, 1869
  - Rutherford B. Hayes becomes 19th President of the United States on March 4, 1877
  - James A. Garfield becomes 20th President of the United States on March 4, 1881
  - Benjamin Harrison becomes 23rd President of the United States on March 4, 1889
  - William McKinley becomes 25th President of the United States on March 4, 1897
  - William Howard Taft becomes 27th President of the United States on March 4, 1909
  - Warren G. Harding becomes 29th President of the United States on March 4, 1921
  - Cuyahoga Valley National Park established on October 11, 2000

=== History of Ohio, by region ===
==== By municipality ====
- History of Cincinnati
- History of Cleveland
- History of Columbus, Ohio
- History of Kent, Ohio

==== By county ====
- History of Allen County
- History of Belmont County
- History of Butler County
- History of Carroll County
- History of Clermont County
- History of Clinton County
- History of Columbiana County
- History of Cuyahoga County

=== History of Ohio, by subject ===
- History of the Jews in Ohio
- List of Ohio state legislatures
- History of the Ohio State University
  - History of Ohio State Buckeyes football
- History of Ohio Wesleyan University
- Ohio Academy of History

== Culture of Ohio ==
- Cuisine of Ohio
- Museums in Ohio
- Religion in Ohio
  - Episcopal Diocese of Ohio
- Scouting in Ohio
- State symbols of Ohio
  - Flag of the state of Ohio
  - Great Seal of the State of Ohio

=== Arts in Ohio ===
- Music of Ohio
- Theater in Ohio

=== Sports in Ohio ===
Sports in Ohio

== Economy and infrastructure of Ohio ==
Economy of Ohio

- Communications in Ohio
  - Newspapers in Ohio
  - Radio stations in Ohio
  - Television stations in Ohio
- Energy in Ohio
  - Wind power in Ohio
- Health care in Ohio
  - Hospitals in Ohio
- Transportation in Ohio
  - Airports in Ohio
  - Roads in Ohio
    - U.S. Highways in Ohio
    - Interstate Highways in Ohio
    - State highways in Ohio
  - Rail Stations in Ohio
    - Cleveland's Rail Transit System

== Education in Ohio ==
Education in Ohio

- Schools in Ohio
  - School districts in Ohio
    - High schools in Ohio
  - Colleges and universities in Ohio
    - Case Western Reserve University
    - Kent State University
    - Miami University
    - Ohio University
    - Ohio State University
    - Bowling Green State University
    - The University of Toledo
    - University of Cincinnati
    - Wright State University

== See also ==
- Topic overview:
  - Ohio
  - Index of Ohio-related articles
