= Ohio estate tax =

As of January 1, 2013, the state of Ohio no longer imposes an estate tax on the transfer of assets from resident decedents (or on Ohio assets of nonresidents). In previous years the rates and amounts varied. The 2012 tax rates are shown in the table below. Because of tax credits, the effective lower limit on taxable estates was $338,333. Ohio also allowed a "marital deduction" equal to the net value of any asset passing to the surviving spouse.

In 2005, another inheritance-related tax, called the Ohio additional estate tax or "pick-up tax", was eliminated (see entry at "sponge tax").

The state enforced the tax (through its administrative officers in the counties) and received the tax revenues but retained only 20% of the tax and passed the rest on to the townships or municipalities associated with the resident decedent or the resident decedent's real property.

An attempt to end the Ohio estate tax was blocked in 2001 when state revenues began to drop and intense lobbying from a league of suburban municipalities lobbied for a continuation of the tax. In 2007, the Ohio estate tax was again proposed for amendment or repeal. A repealing the estate tax of Ohio was enacted by its general assembly during its 2011-2012 session, to take effect on "individuals dying on or after January 1, 2013."

For dates of death on or after January 1, 2002:

Taxable Estate Bracket	Tax Rate
Over $338,333 but not over $500,000	$13,900 plus 6% of the excess over $338,333
Over $500,000	23,600 plus 7% of the excess over $500,000

== See also ==
- Estate tax in the United States
