= Sponge tax =

The sponge tax was a US state-level estate tax linked to the calculation of the federal estate tax. States with this tax collected the amount allowable as a tax credit to the federal estate tax if paid in state estate taxes. In practice, this additional estate tax was levied directly at the state level but generated a tax credit against the federal tax up to a specified amount.

== History ==
Under a sponge tax regime, the estate will pay no more in total federal and state estate taxes than it would have paid if there were no state estate tax. This meant that estate planning that produced the best federal estate tax result would automatically produce the best state estate tax result. The state estate tax gets its name because the state is "sponging" off the federal tax.

The 2001 Federal Tax Act phased out the federal credit, completely eliminating it in 2005. (The federal estate tax law did replace the credit with a much lower deduction for state estate taxes paid.) The effect of the elimination of the federal credit has generally been the creation of state-level estate taxes to replace the lost revenue.
