= List of Ohio state symbols =

Location of the state of Ohio in the United States of America

This is a list of state symbols for the US state of Ohio. The majority of these items are officially recognized by state law, having been ratified by an act of the Ohio General Assembly and executed by the governor's signature. These items can be found in the Ohio Revised Code, General Provisions, Chapter 5. Two of Ohio's official symbols have not been officially signed into law, but were made official through resolution.

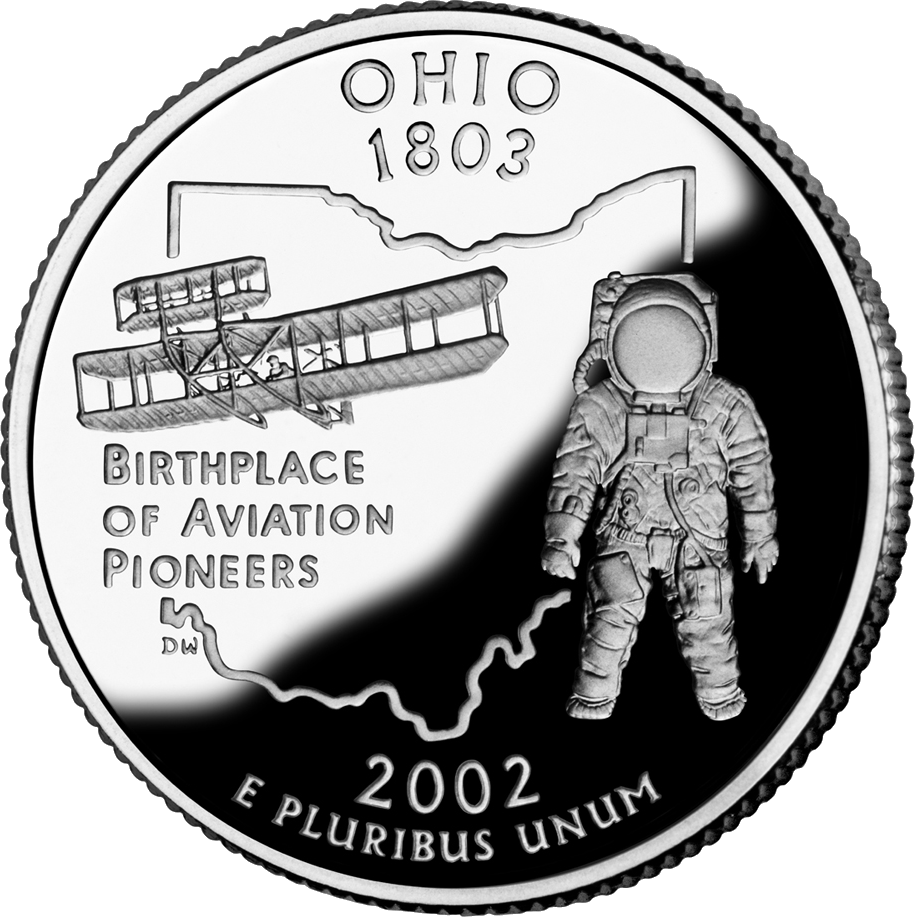
Ohio's commemorative quarter.

== State motto ==
Adopted in 1959, the Ohio motto, With God, all things are possible, is a quotation taken from Matthew, 19:26. From 1865 until 1867, however, the motto was: Imperium in Imperio (Latin for "Empire within an Empire"). Too controversial for a post-Civil War society, it was repealed after two years.

== State slogan ==
On Ohio's 2013 license plate design, "Birthplace of Aviation" is given prominent placement among 45 other slogans and factoids.

The current official marketing slogan (as of 2008) is: Ohio—Birthplace of Aviation, in reference to Orville and Wilbur Wright, the inventing duo from Dayton who are credited with building the first successful airplane. A similar version of the slogan appears on Ohio's commemorative state quarter. In the case of the quarter, it reads: Birthplace of aviation pioneers. The addition of pioneers on the quarter's version, denotes space as well as air travel, as Ohio has been the birthplace of 24 NASA astronauts.

== State symbols ==
State flag

Main article: Flag of Ohio

Since 1902, Ohio has had a flag unique in design amongst its domestic counterparts. The Ohio swallowtail flag was designed by Cleveland architect John Eisenmann. The flag was first unveiled at the 1901 Pan-American Exposition in Buffalo, a year before it was officially adopted by the Ohio General Assembly. Eisenmann explained the flag's symbolism:

"The triangles formed by the main lines of the flag represent the hills and valleys as typified in the State Seal, and the stripes the roads and waterways. The stars, indicating the thirteen original states of the Union, are grouped about the circle which represents the Northwest Territory; and that Ohio was the seventeenth state admitted into the Union is shown by adding four more stars. The white circle with its red center, not only represents the initial letter of Ohio, but is suggestive of its being the Buckeye State."

To commemorate the centennial of the flag In 2002, the General Assembly adopted The Pledge of Allegiance to the Flag of Ohio: I salute the flag of the state of Ohio and pledge to the Buckeye State respect and loyalty. The pledge was designed to be given by Ohio residents following the Pledge of Allegiance.

State seal

Main article: Great Seal of Ohio

While it has been revised several times over the centuries, the Great Seal of Ohio currently features the following device, which closely resembles the design passed into law on March 25, 1803, by the first session of the General Assembly:

In the right foreground of the shield a full sheaf of wheat bound and standing erect; in the left foreground, a cluster of seventeen arrows bound in the center and resembling in form the sheaf of wheat; in the background, a representation of Mount Logan, Ross county, as viewed from Adena state memorial; over the mount, a rising sun three-quarters exposed and radiating thirteen rays to represent the thirteen original colonies shining over the first state in the northwest territory, the exterior extremities of which rays form a semicircle; and uniting the background and foreground, a representation of the Scioto river and cultivated fields.

— ORC §5.04

The sheaf of wheat represents Ohio's agriculture; the seventeen arrows for Ohio being the seventeenth state admitted into the Union; the Sun portrayed as rising is an allusion to coming wealth and prosperity; the mountains, over which the Sun is depicted, are symbolic of Ohio being the first state west of the Allegheny range. The Great Seal was inspired by the view of the Scioto River Valley from the Adena Mansion, the Chillicothe-area home of Ohio's sixth governor.

State tree

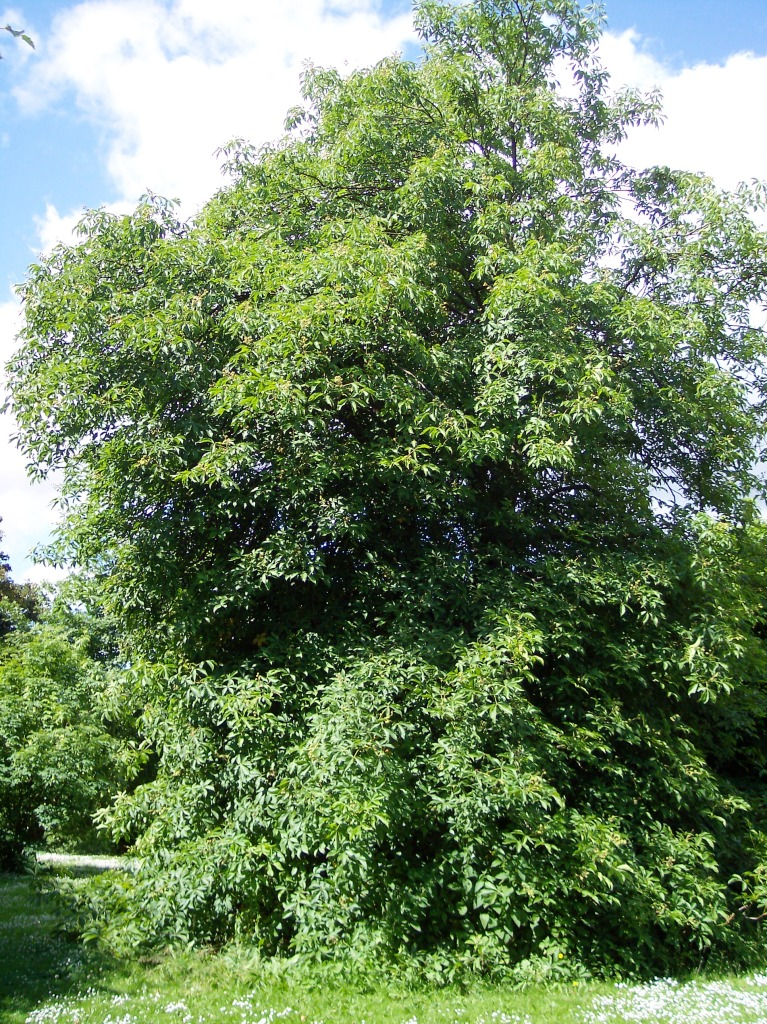

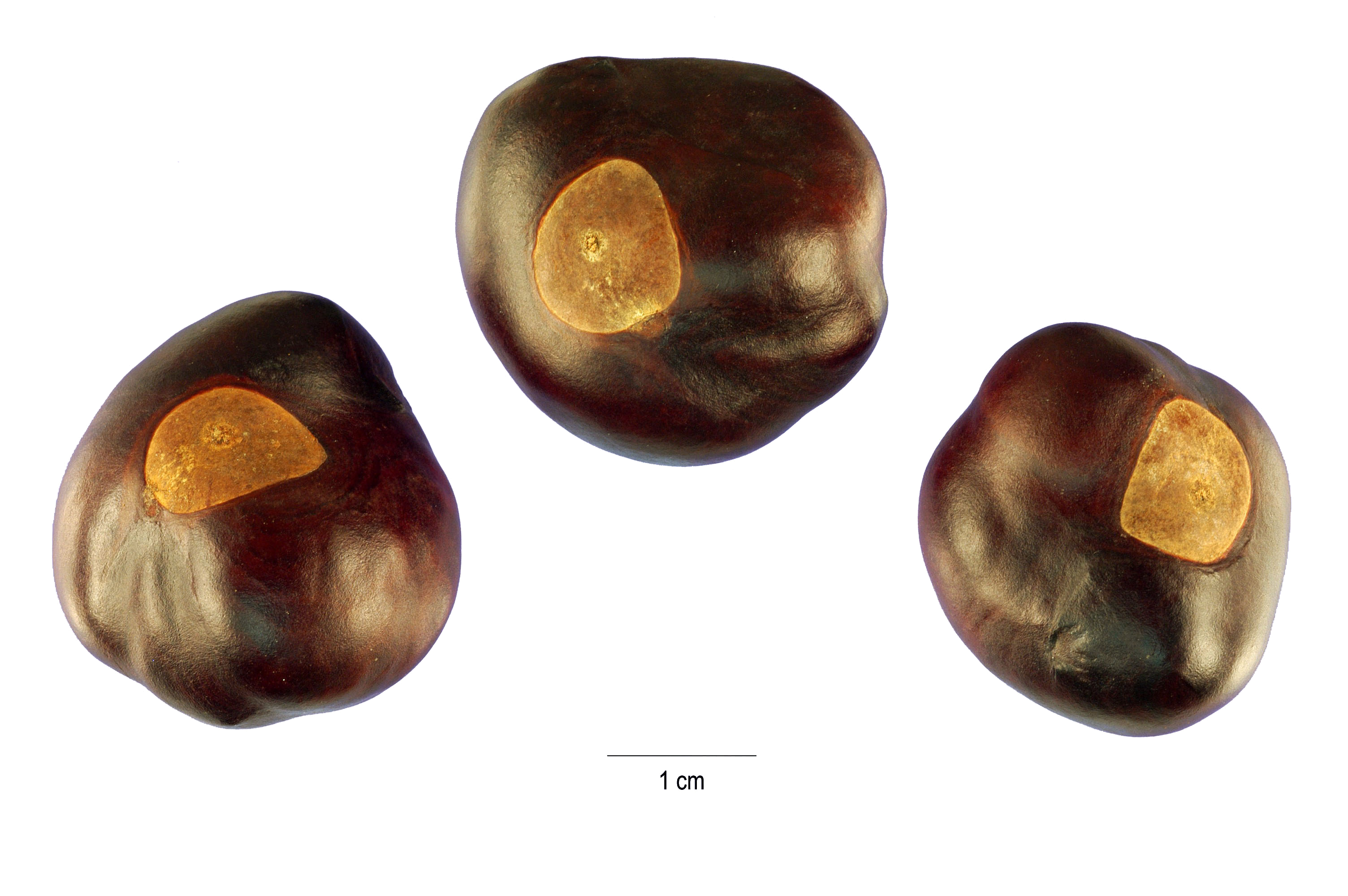

Main article: Ohio buckeye

The official state tree of Ohio is the Ohio buckeye (Aesculus glabra). Perhaps the earliest example of what can be included as an official state symbol of Ohio was, at least until the mid-20th century, unofficial.

Ohio natives have long been referred to as Buckeyes, although the debate on when this exactly began is inconclusive. Historical sources point to at least two instances: the first of these involves Col. Ebenezer Sproat, the first sheriff in the Northwest Territory and Ohio Country in 1788. Sproat was dubbed hetuck (trans: buckeye) by the local Indians, whom he met with in Marietta and was ever after known as buckeye. The second notable occurrence—and arguably the more documented—began around the 1840 election of the one time army commander and eventual ill-fated 9th President of the United States, William Henry Harrison. Whig convention delegates for Harrison adorned themselves with various buckeye paraphernalia, which Harrison had chosen as his symbol.

The buckeye had also been the athletic nickname of the state's largest public university for decades before a 1953 act of the Ohio General Assembly recognized the Ohio buckeye as the official state tree.

State flower

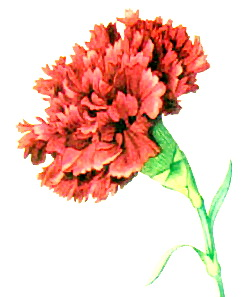

Cultivated flower
The state flower of Ohio is the scarlet carnation. On February 3, 1904, the Ohio General Assembly passed a resolution providing for a state flower to be chosen. The act naming the Carnation as the state flower specified the scarlet carnation for the memory of William McKinley. McKinley, who was assassinated in 1901, was one of seven presidents born in Ohio. He was reported to have always worn a scarlet carnation in his lapel for good luck, after having received one—from his opponent—during his campaign for the U.S. House of Representatives. He won the election, and wore a carnation thereafter.

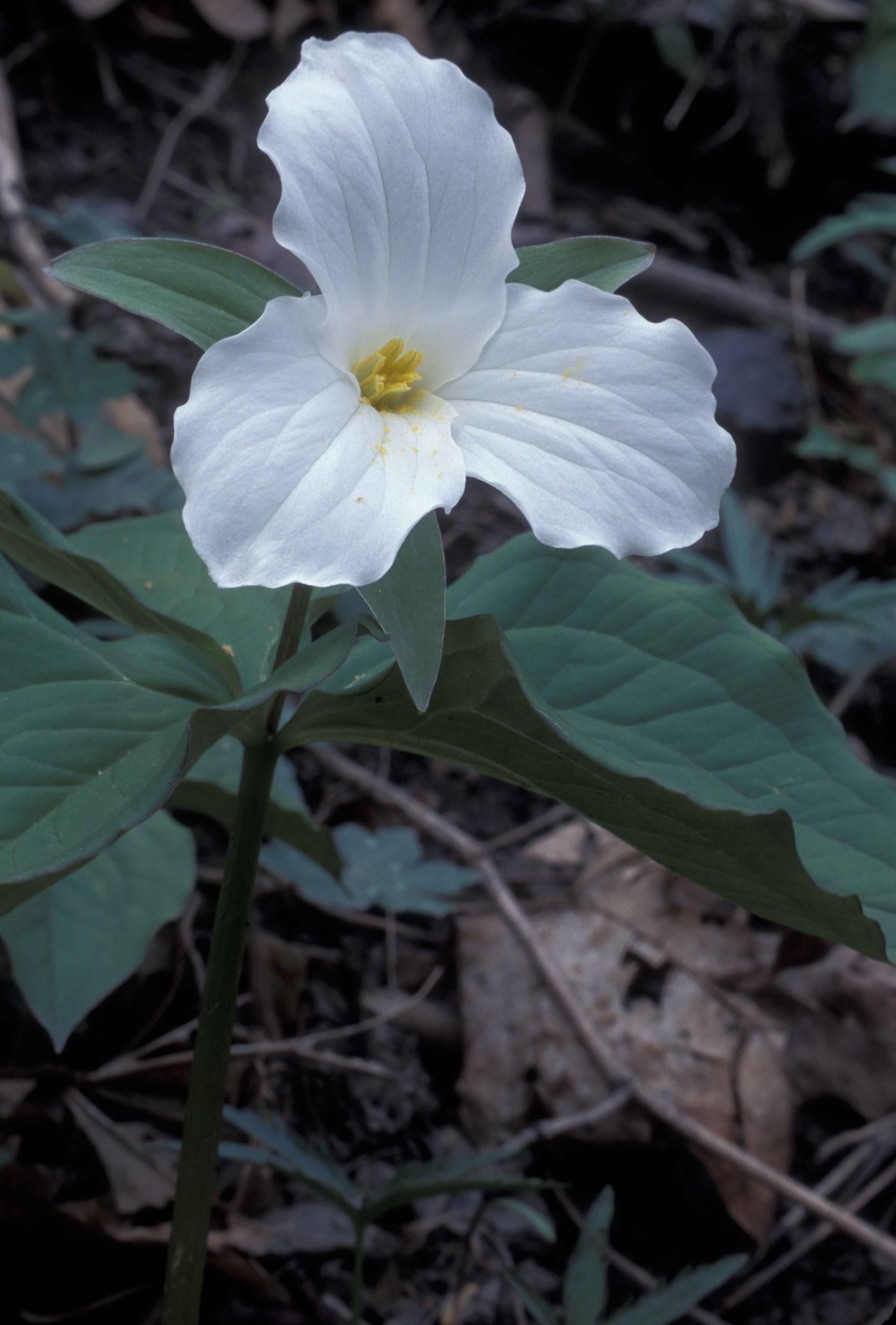
Large white trillium (Trillium grandiflorum)

Wildflower

The state wildflower of Ohio is the large white trillium (Trillium grandiflorum). In 1982, the Native Plant Society of Northeastern Ohio assembled with a goal of nominating and selecting a flower that was "native" to Ohio to unseat the scarlet carnation. On April 26, 1983, the group selected the large white trillium to take on the role as state wildflower, which they brought to state representatives in 1984. A year later, State Representative Bob Clark, a member of the House Natural Resources Committee, sponsored a bill to name the large white trillium the official state wildflower of Ohio, leading the scarlet carnation as state flower.

Trillium was chosen by the Society because it was present in all 88 counties of Ohio, could be easily recognized, and was not endangered.

State bird

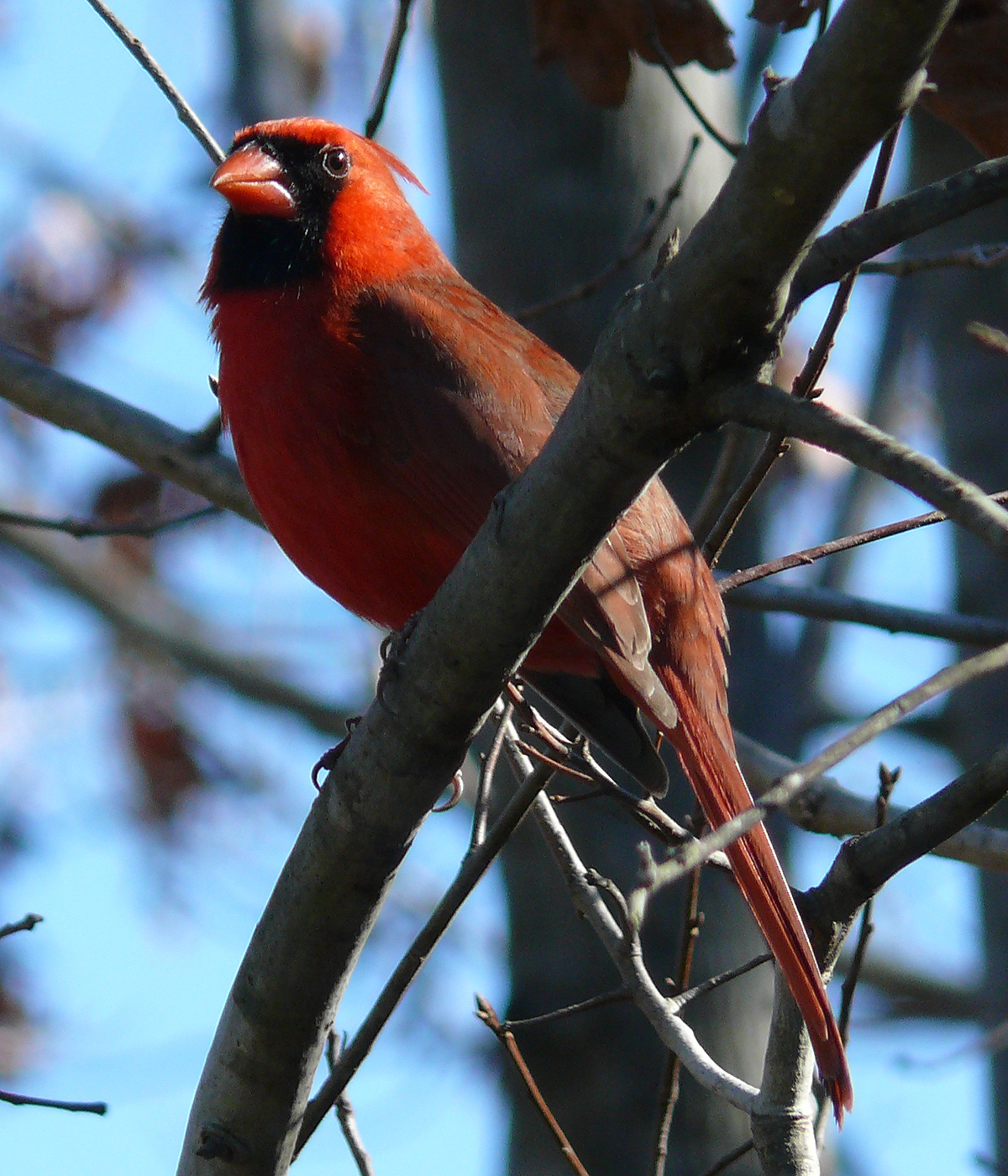
Cardinal (C. cardinalis)
Ohio's state bird, the cardinal (C. cardinalis), was designated the state bird by the General Assembly in 1933. It was then listed as effective in the Ohio Revised Code in 1953.
State animal

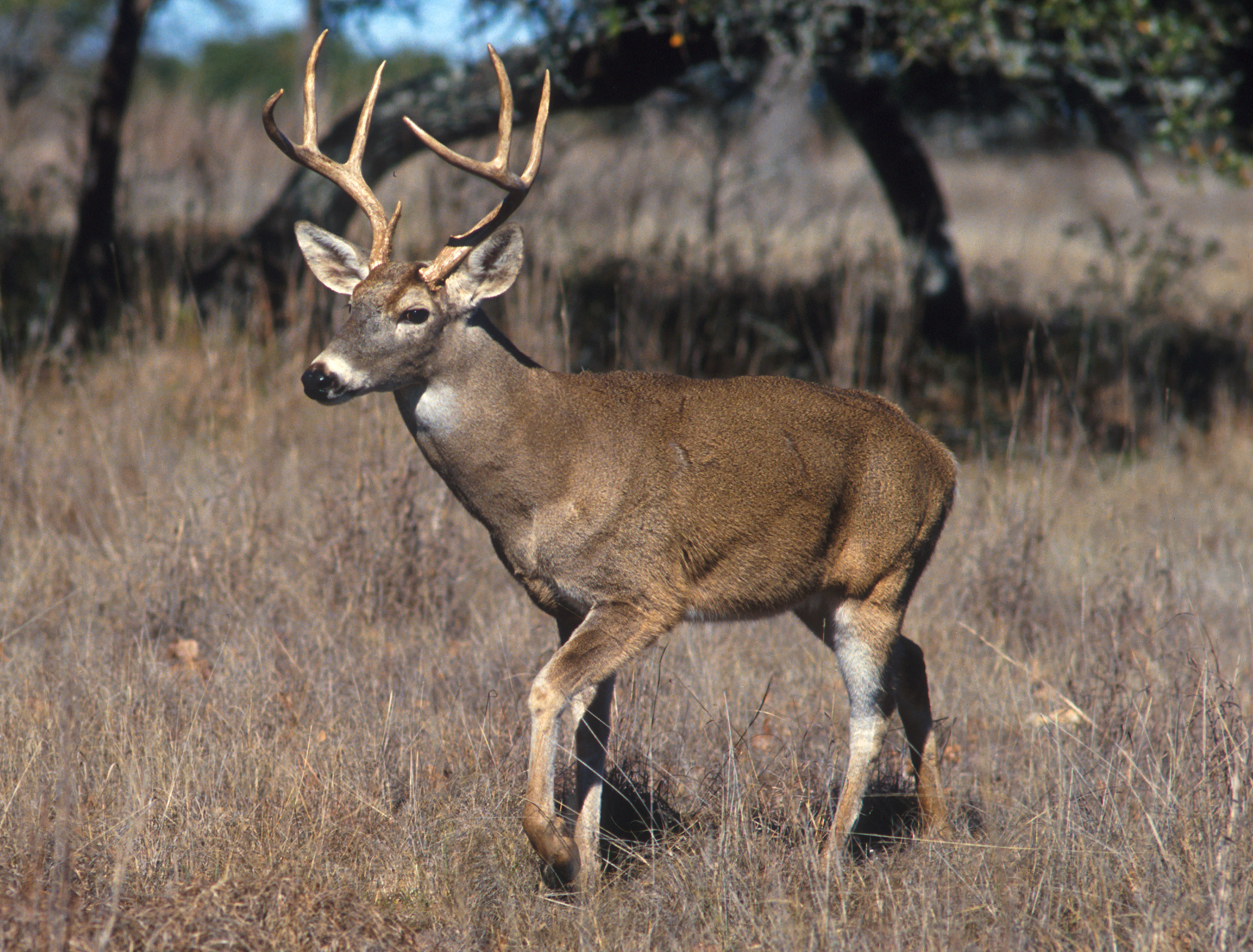
State animal – white-tailed deer
The white-tailed deer (O. virginianus) became the official state animal in 1988.
State reptile

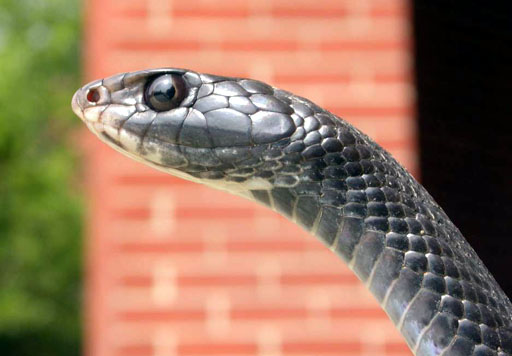
The black racer became the state reptile in 1995.
State amphibian

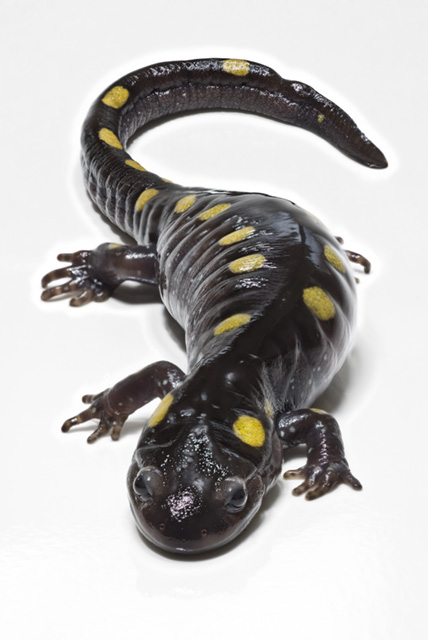
The spotted salamander was made the state amphibian in 2010.
State frog

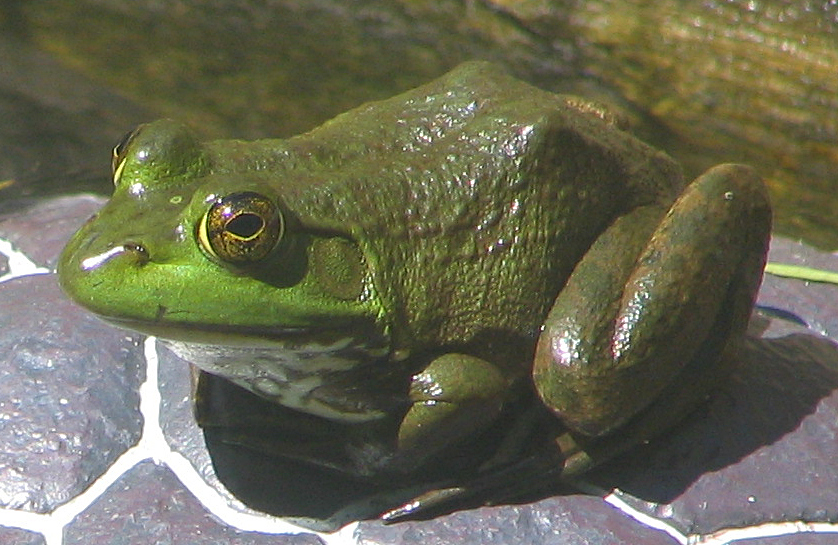
The American bullfrog was made the state frog in 2010.
State insect

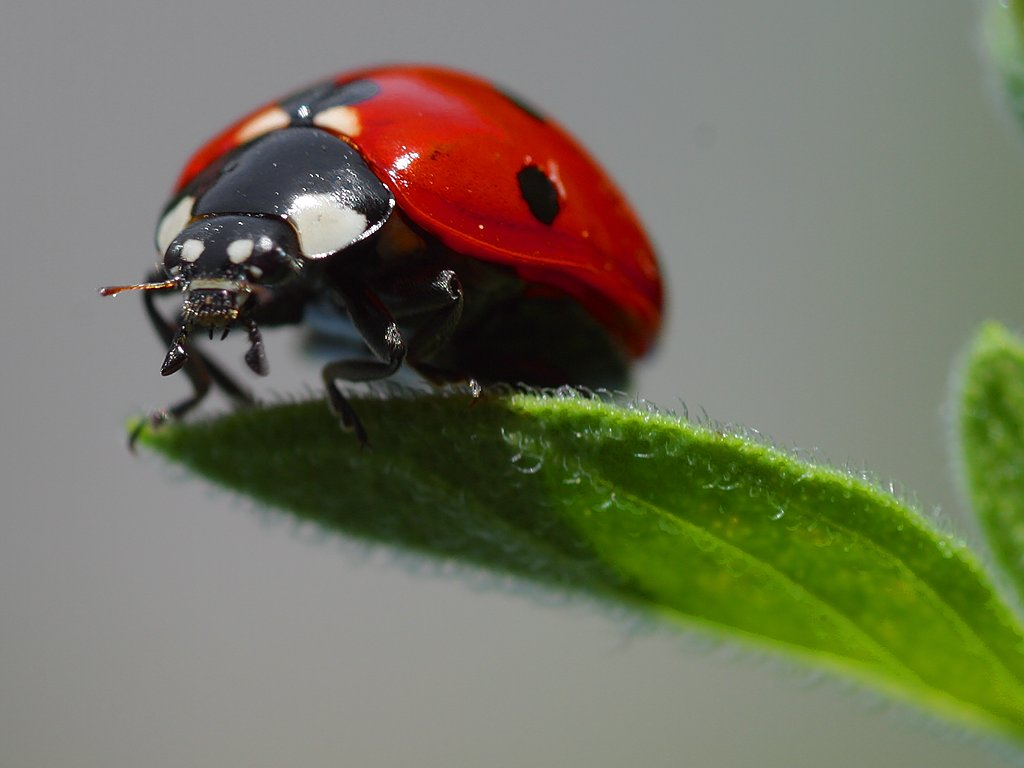
The Ladybug was designated as the official state insect by Senate Concurrent Resolution 14, 111th General Assembly, 1975–1976 Session. It was designated Ohio's official insect by Public Chapter 896 of the 99th General Assembly. A specific species of the Family Coccinellidae was never designated Though some sources erroneously claimed the state insect was the 7-spotted ladybeetle, that is inaccurate. The Ohio Governor's page lists that the state insect is a ladybeetle indigenous to Ohio, therefore ruling out the possibility of the state insect being the 7-Spot, which is an invasive species in Ohio native to Europe.

State fossil or
State invertebrate fossil

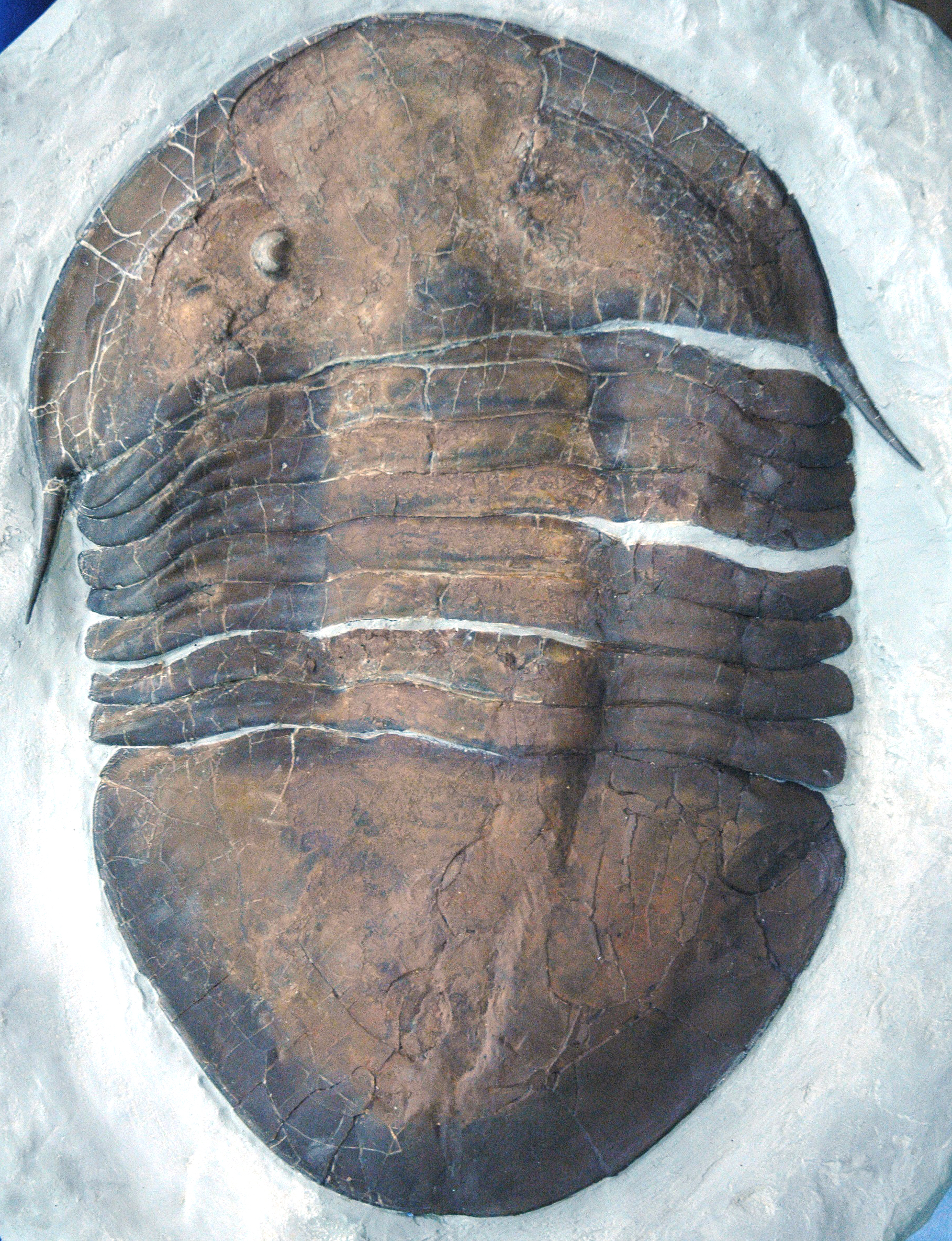
The Isotelus maximus trilobite became the official state invertebrate fossil in 1985.

State vertebrate fossil or
State fossil fish

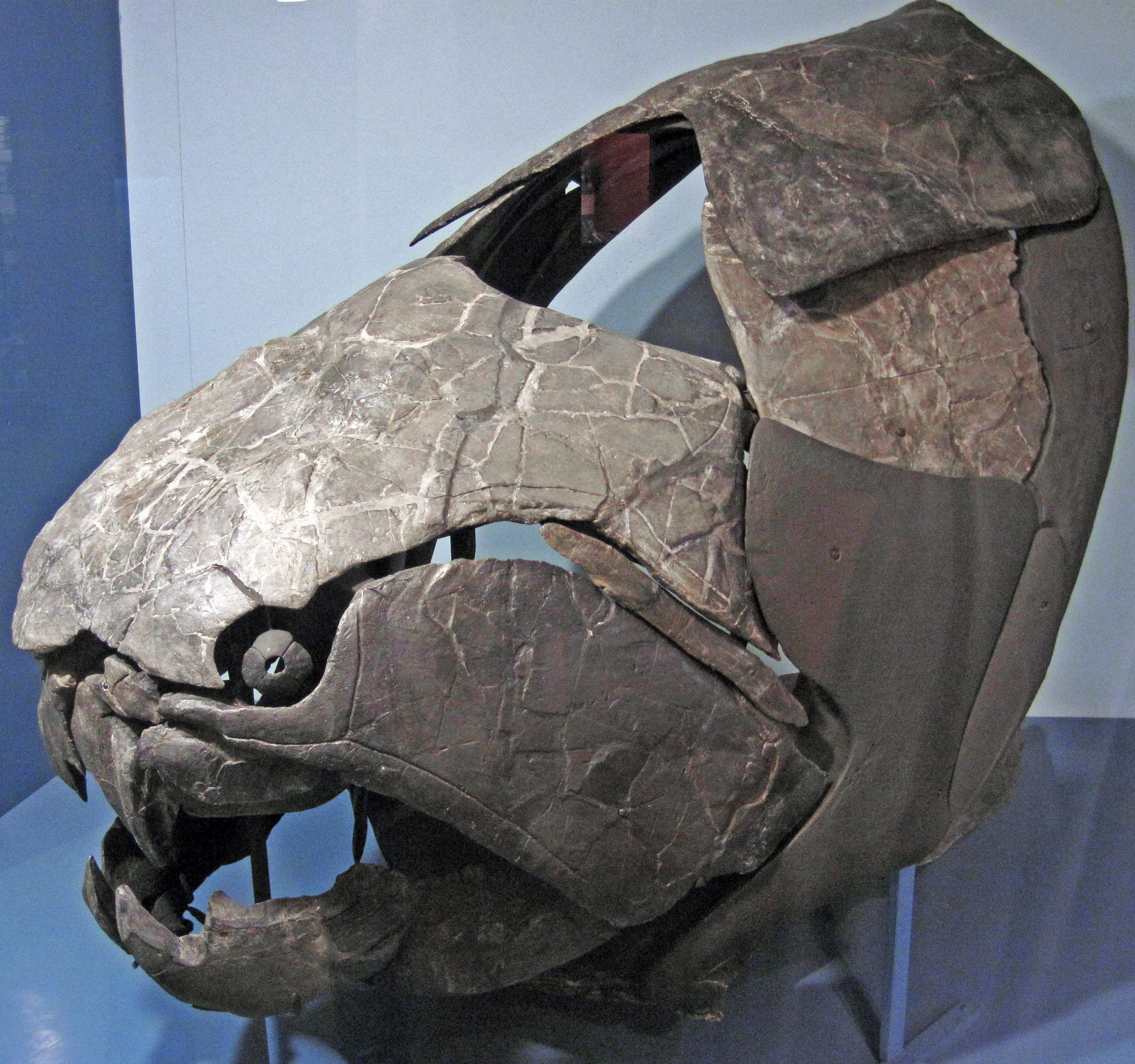
The Dunkleosteus maximus placoderm fish became the official state fossil in 2021.

State gemstone

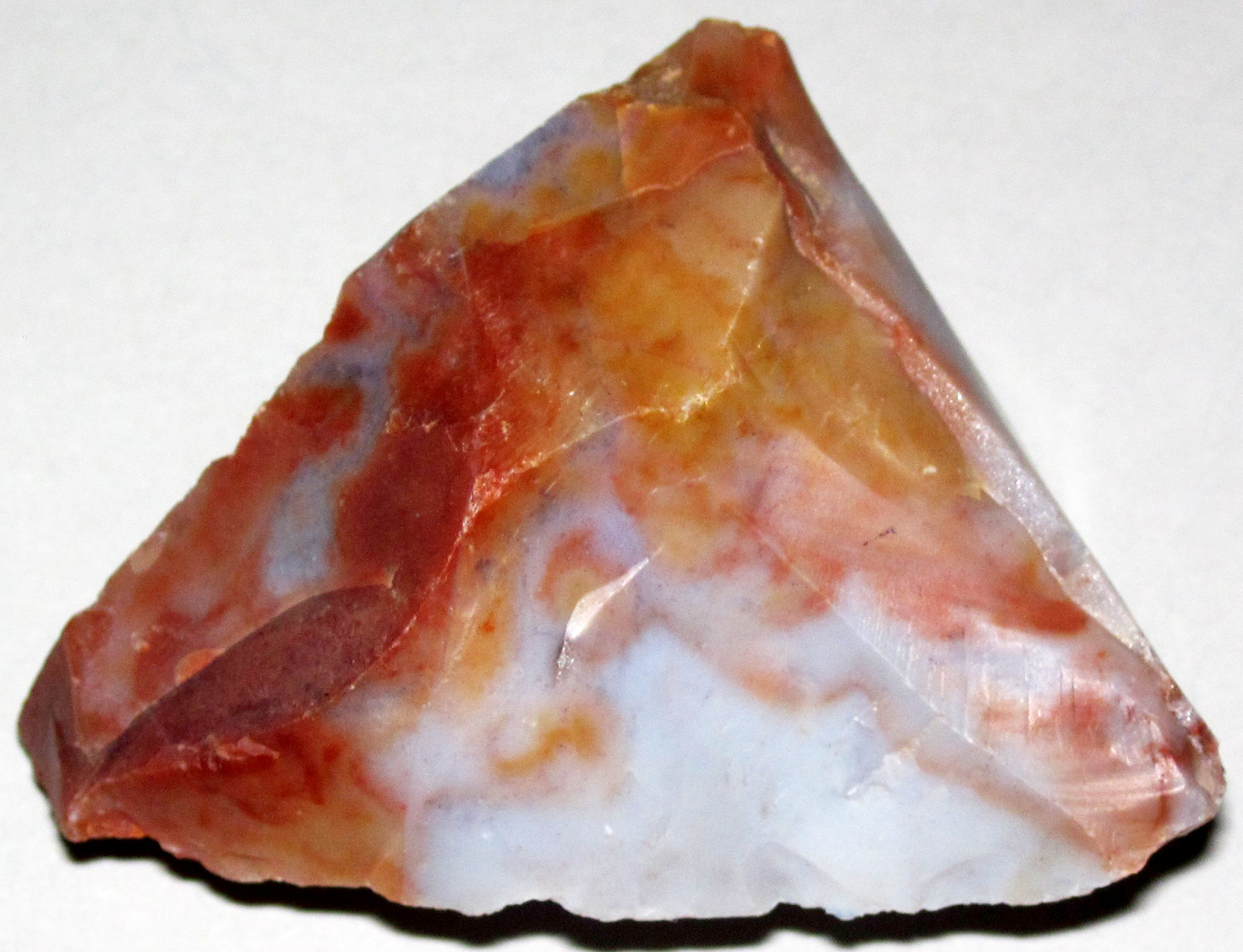
Ohio flint became the official state gem stone in 1965.

State Historical Architectural Structure

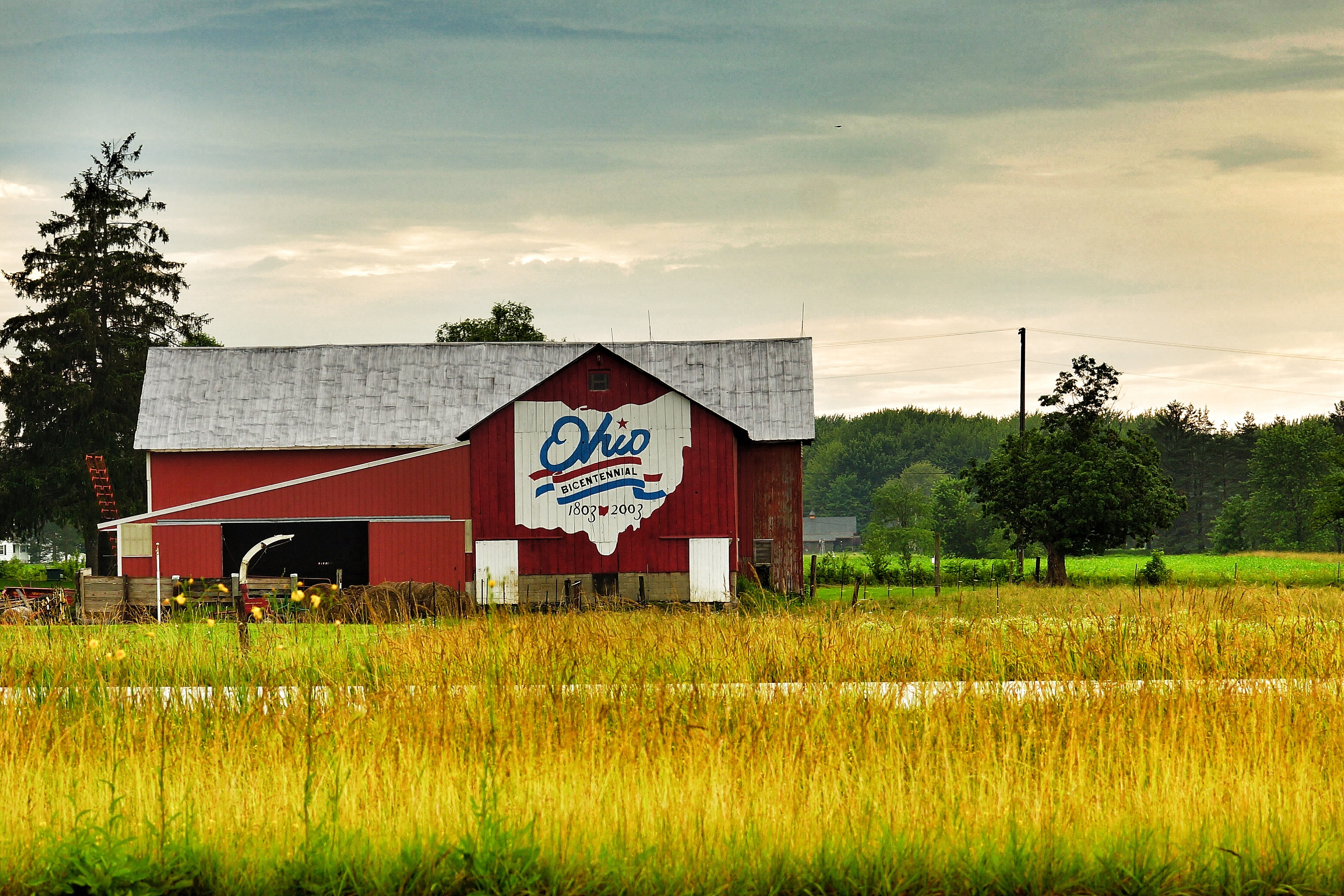
The barn, an agricultural building located on farms and used for many purposes, was designated the official historical architectural structure of the State of Ohio on March 20, 2019. Enacted by Senate Bill 86, 132nd General Assembly. The bill started as a middle school project by 4 Westerville teenagers that worked for 4 years to get the bill passed.

State prehistoric monument

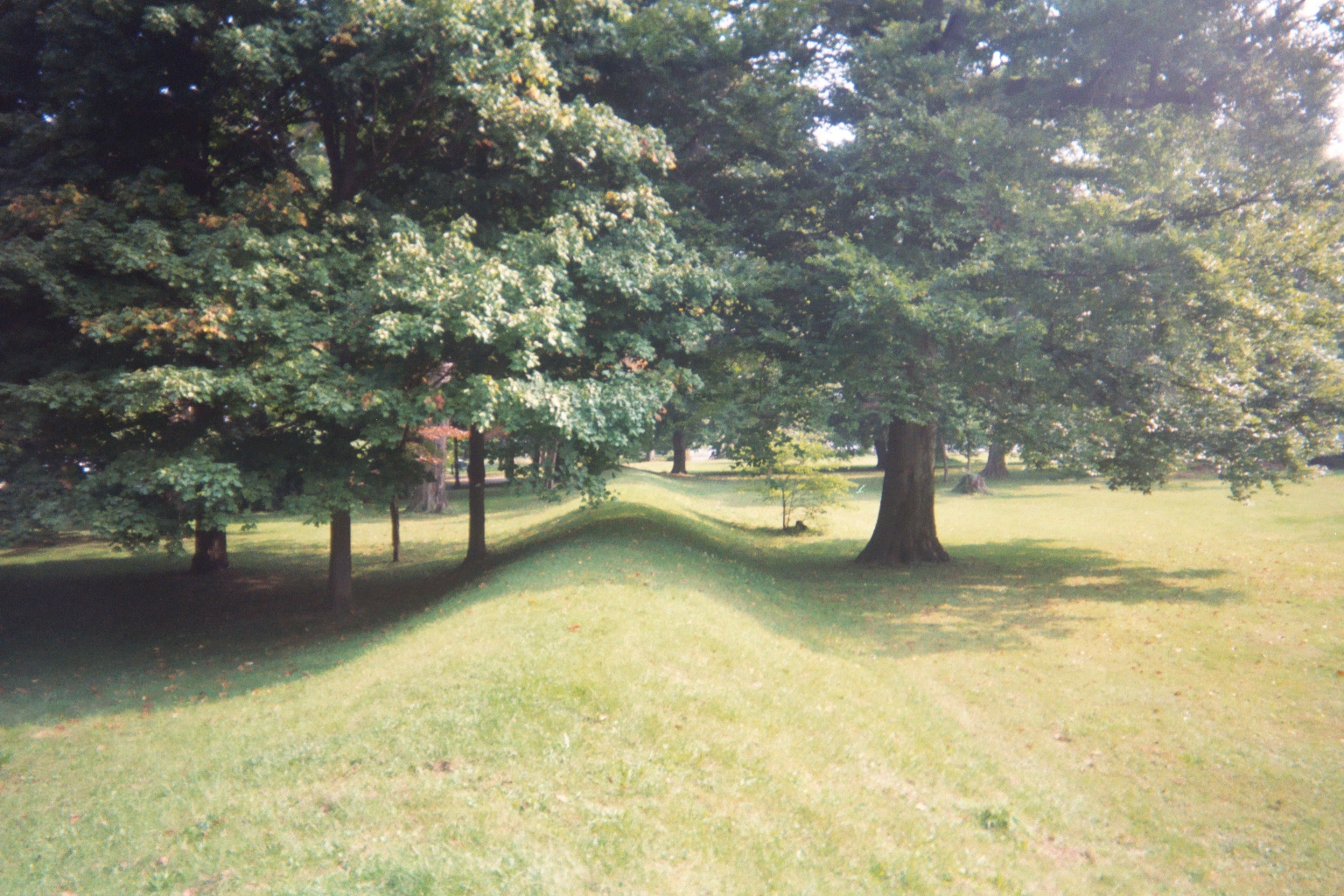
Main article: Newark Earthworks

The Newark Earthworks became the official state prehistoric monument in 2006 by §5.073 of the Ohio Revised code.

State fruits

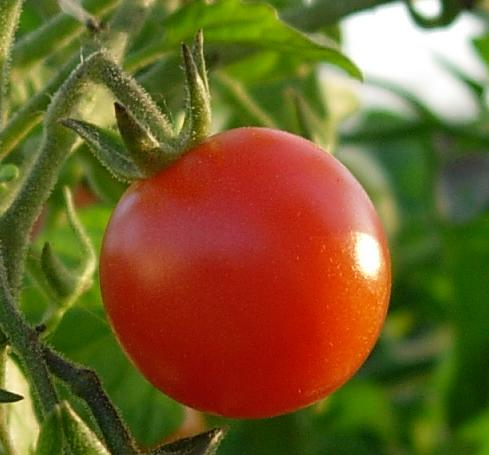

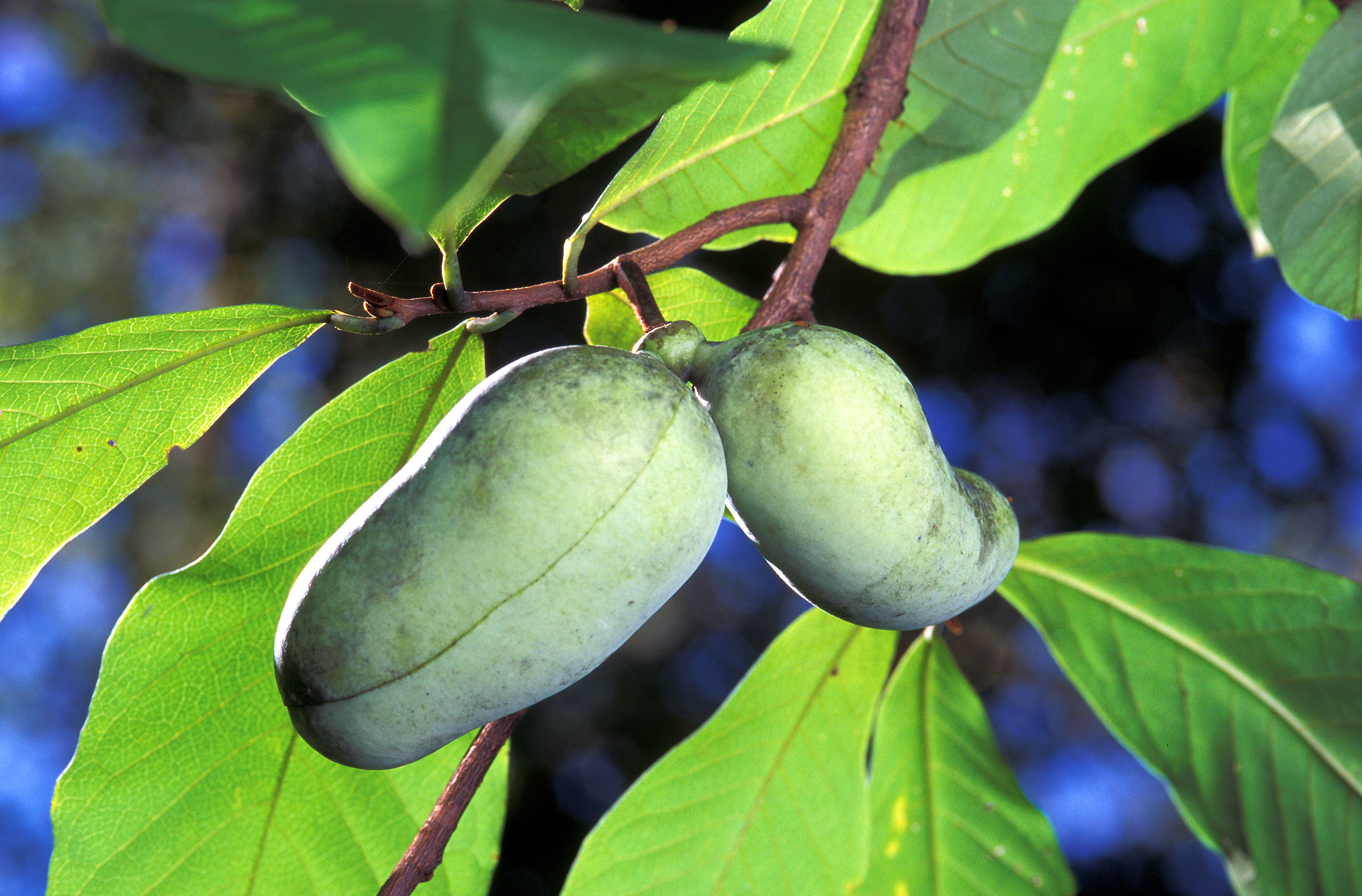

Fruit
Tomatoes became the state fruit in 2009.

Native fruit
The pawpaw became the state native fruit in 2009 as well.

State beverage

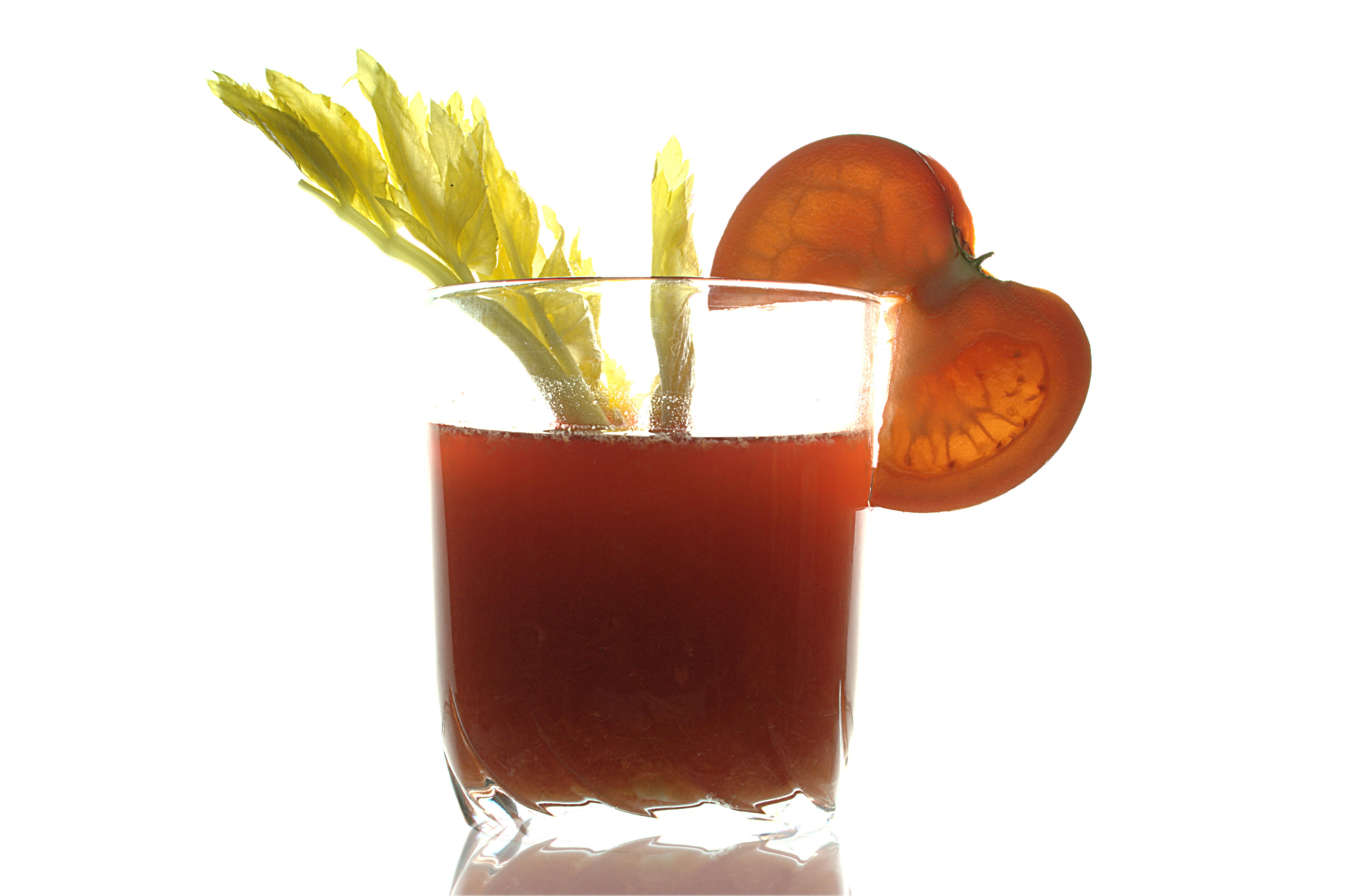
Tomato juice became the state beverage through a bill passed in 1965.

Groundhog

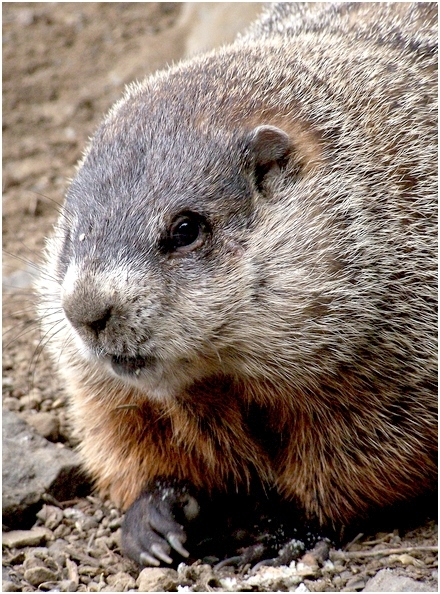
Ohio's official groundhog is named Buckeye Chuck.

U.S. ship

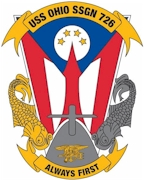
The USS Ohio is a ballistic missile submarine, which is not only the name of the ship, but the official name of the class of submarine as well.

== State songs ==
Ohio's official songs include:

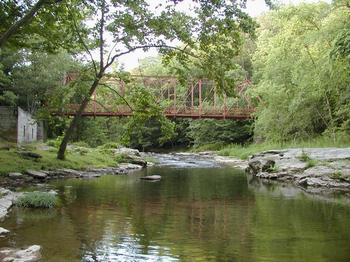
"Beautiful Ohio", by Ballard MacDonald (lyrics) and Robert A. King under the pen name Mary Earl (music), was adopted as the official state song in 1969. In 1989, the Ohio Legislature gave Wilbert B. McBride permission to update the lyrics.

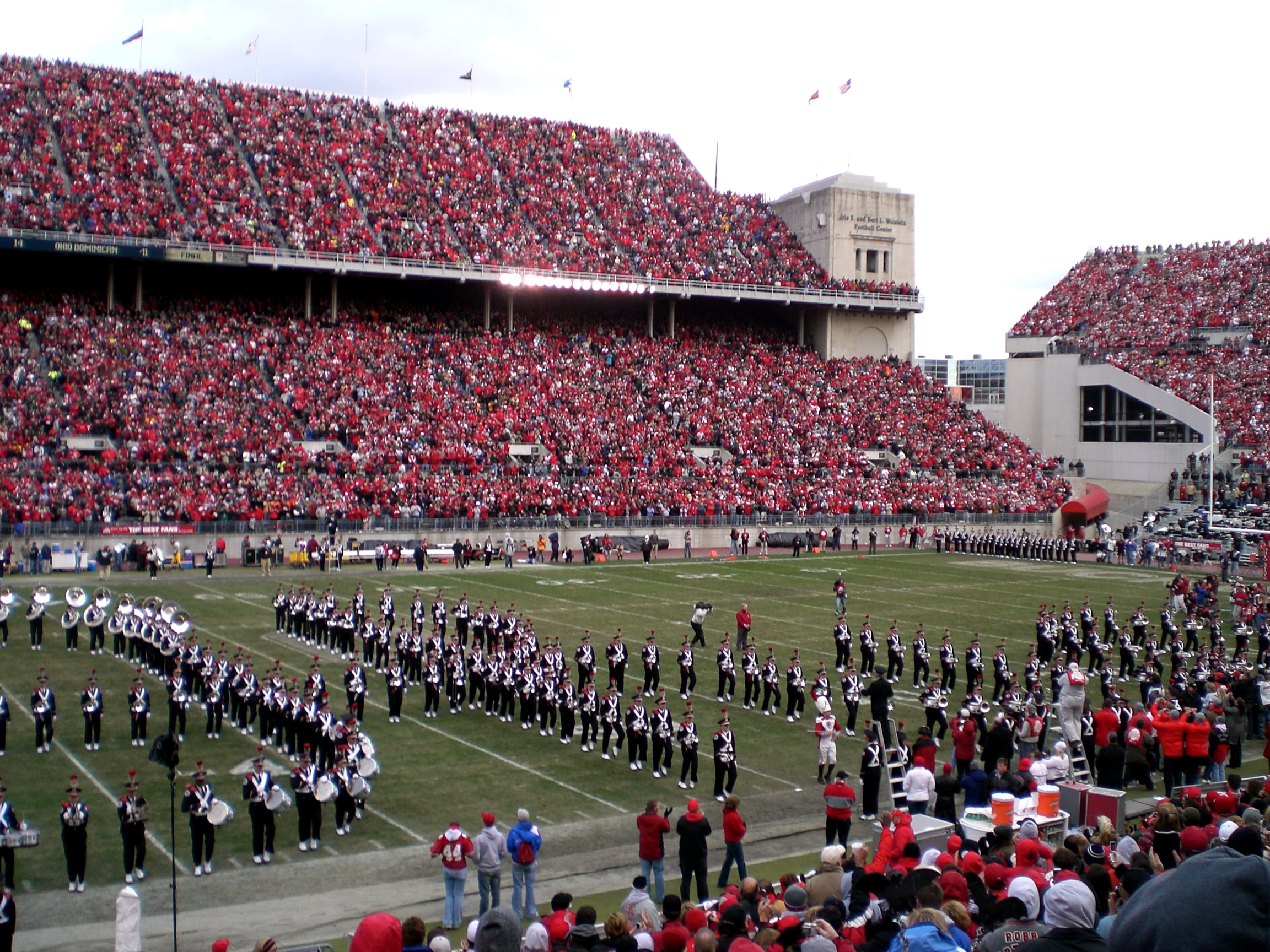
"Hang on Sloopy", by Wes Farrell and Bert Russell, is the state's official rock song, adopted by the General Assembly in 1985. The song's status was never signed into law, but rather was enacted through House Concurrent Resolution 16, 116th General Assembly, 1985–1986 Session.

== Miscellaneous symbols ==
Carnation City

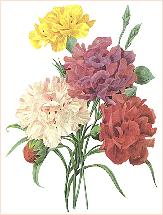
Main article: Alliance, Ohio

In 1959, the General Assembly named Alliance the "Carnation City" of Ohio.

Bicentennial Bridge

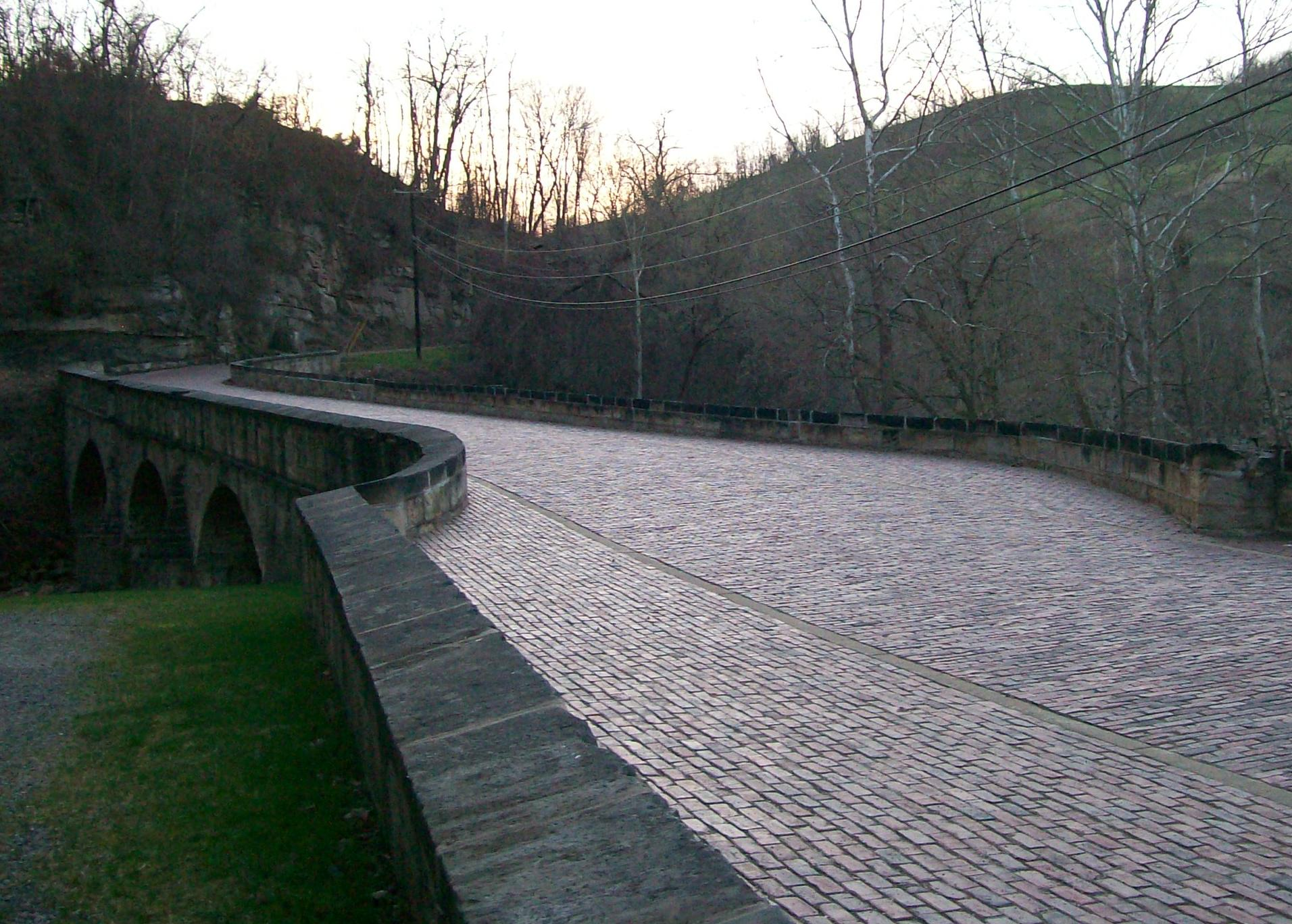
Main article: Blaine Hill "S" Bridge

The Blaine Hill Bridge in Belmont County, which was constructed in 1828 as part of the National Road, is the oldest bridge in the state. It was named the state bicentennial bridge in 2002.

== See also ==
- List of Ohio-related topics
- Lists of United States state insignia
- State of Ohio

== Citations & references ==
- All listed codes (§) are from the General Provisions of the Ohio Revised Code unless otherwise stated. Retrieved in March 2008.
