= Tri-Rivers Educational Computer Association =

Technology support center for Ohio school districts

Coordinates: 40.57149°N 83.124962°W

Tri-Rivers Educational Computer Association (TRECA)
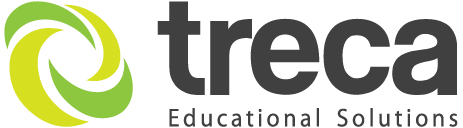
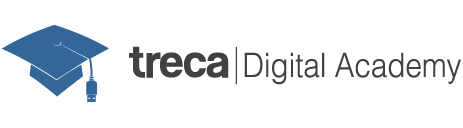
- Industry: Education
- Headquarters: Marion, OH, US
- Key people: Mike Carder, CEO/Superintendent; Tim Hilborn, CIO; Scott Armstrong, CFO/Treasurer
- Website: treca.org

Tri-Rivers Educational Computer Association (TRECA) in an information technology center (ITC) serving the state of Ohio and founded in 1979. It serves a consortium of local school districts across the state of Ohio, providing technology and educational support. TRECA provides services in the areas of student information systems, state reporting, fiscal services, instructional services, professional development training and information technology support.

TRECA also operates TRECA Digital Academy, an online public school for Ohio students in grades K-12 headquartered in Marion, Ohio. Operated by TRECA, the school provides students in many school districts in Ohio with distance learning options. The program serves nearly 3000 students and is particularly targeted at students who are at-risk, ill, or home-schooled. Students work from home on school-supplied computers; they correspond with teachers and send in assignments electronically. The Akron school district has the largest such program in Ohio. Students who complete the program through 12th grade graduate with a regular high school diploma and even a cap-and-gown graduation ceremony.

In 2018, TRECA Digital Academy began offering students an opportunity to learn workplace skills, earn college credit, and pursue industry credentials through a career technical education program called TRECA Tech. The courses in the program currently include cybersecurity, marketing, computer and web programming, business and administrative services, interactive media, finance, accounting, and Cisco networking.
