= Ohio National Organization for Women =

The Ohio National Organization for Women (Ohio NOW) was formed in April 1972 in order to more easily connect the Ohio chapters to the National Organization. Ohio NOW has 9 total chapters located in Akron, Ashtabula, Cincinnati, Cleveland, Columbus, Dayton, Oberlin, Port Clinton, and Toledo. The National Organization for Women is a non-partisan, non-profit organization funded by private donations and membership dues.

== Goals ==
The Ohio NOW chapter focuses on six main issues: reproductive rights, ending sex discrimination/constitutional equality, promoting diversity and ending racism, economic justice, stopping violence against women, and lesbian rights including marriage equality.

== Priorities ==
Specific issues that have been or are currently a focus of the Ohio National Organization for Women.

=== Abortion ===
Access to safe abortions in Ohio is becoming increasingly difficult due to Ohio abortion laws and the attempts to close many of Ohio's abortion clinics.

Ohio NOW is working towards keeping the Center for Choice abortion clinic open in Toledo by attempting to find a transfer clinic for the center's patients.

=== Campus Sexual Assault ===
The organization works with Changing Campus Culture, an initiative started by the Ohio Department of Higher Education, to help prevent and respond to sexual violence occurring on state campuses. The initiative received $2 million from the state budget to focus on individual campus needs, training programs, and individual grants. The initiative seeks to prevent sexual violence based on received input from campus presidents, advocacy groups, and community experts in order to create recommended practices.

==== Recommendations ====
1. Use data to guide action.
2. Empower staff, faculty, campus law enforcement and students to prevent and respond to sexual violence through evidence-based training.
3. Communicate a culture of shared respect and responsibility.
4. Develop a comprehensive response policy.
5. Adopt a survivor-centered response.

=== Equal Pay ===
Ohio NOW and the National branch work with the Department of Labor to decrease the pay gap between men and women. On average, full-time working women earn just 78 cents for every dollar a man earns.

==== Ohio Equal Pay Act ====
Ohio State Rep. Kathleen Clyde (D-Kent) and Rep. Stephanie Howse (D-Cleveland) introduced House Bill 330 in September, aiming to eliminate pay disparities for women. The Bill addresses causes of the pay gap and is divided into three components:

1. Requires state and local governments to determine the value of comparable work across job categories and to eliminate lower pay that is sometimes associated with "women work." Value of the work is measured across job categories as a composite of the skill, effort, responsibility, and working conditions normally required in the performance of the work.
2. Requires businesses that receive state contracts or state economic incentive funds to be certified with an Equal Pay Certificate indicating that women employees at the company have access to the same opportunities and pay as their male counterparts as well as information from the company about how their salaries compare with male employees.
3. Prohibits retaliation against employees in any employment actions—such as hiring, firing and promotion decisions for sharing salary information amongst themselves.

=== Steubenville High School ===
The Ohio NOW organization was on the forefront of the Steubenville High School rape case. Ohio NOW collected signatures to continue the investigation to bring justice to the student who was raped, and protested in Columbus for charges to be brought against the individuals responsible for the rape

== NOW Equality PAC ==
NOW Equality PAC (NEP) works at a more local level, as many state and local NOW chapters have political action committees that can support candidates for state, county and city offices, from governors to school board members.

== Presidents ==
Ronnie Rosen 1972

Janet Burnside 1973

Judith Sidwell 1973-1974

Lana Moresky 1974-1975

Debra Hart 1975-1976

Eva Janecek 1976-1977

Maryann Barrett Baker 1977-1979

Linda Furney 1979-1981

Joan Rourke 1981-1983

Kathy Helmbock 1983-1985

Phyllis Carlson-Riehm 1985-1988,1990-1992

Joyce Barolak 1988-1990

Betsy Marshall 1992-1996

Jacqueline Hillyer 1996-2000, 2010-2013

Diane Dodge 2000-2004, 2006-2010

Susan Bader 2004-2006, 2014-2014

Anita Rios 2013-2014, 2014–present
