= List of sister cities in Ohio =

This is a list of sister cities in the United States state of Ohio. Sister cities, known in Europe as twin towns, are cities which partner with each other to promote human contact and cultural links, although this partnering is not limited to cities and often includes counties, regions, states and other sub-national entities.

Many Ohio jurisdictions work with foreign cities through Sister Cities International, an organization whose goal is to "promote peace through mutual respect, understanding, and cooperation."

== A ==
Akron

- Chemnitz, Germany
- Kiryat Ekron, Israel

Athens

- Ostroh, Ukraine

== B ==
Bellefontaine

- Suzuka, Japan

Blue Ash

- Ilmenau, Germany

Bowling Green

- Protvino, Russia
- St. Thomas, Canada

== C ==
Celina

- Minamiawaji, Japan

Centerville

- Bad Zwischenahn, Germany
- Waterloo, Canada

Chillicothe

- Azov, Russia
- Córdoba, Mexico

Cincinnati

- Amman, Jordan
- Gifu, Japan
- Harare, Zimbabwe
- Kharkiv, Ukraine
- Liuzhou, China
- Munich, Germany
- Mysore, India
- Nancy, France
- New Taipei, Taiwan

Cleveland

- Alexandria, Egypt
- Bahir Dar, Ethiopia
- Beit She'an, Israel
- Bengaluru, India
- Brașov, Romania
- Bratislava, Slovakia
- Cape Town, South Africa
- Conakry, Guinea
- Fier, Albania
- Gdańsk, Poland
- Holon, Israel
- Ibadan, Nigeria
- Kigali, Rwanda
- Klaipėda, Lithuania
- Lima, Peru
- Ljubljana, Slovenia
- (Republic of Ireland) County Mayo, Ireland
- Miskolc, Hungary
- Novi Sad, Serbia
- Rouen, France
- Segundo Montes, El Salvador
- Taipei, Taiwan
- Tema, Ghana
- Vicenza, Italy
- Volgograd, Russia

Cleveland Heights

- Volzhsky, Russia

Columbus

- Accra, Ghana
- Ahmedabad, India
- Curitiba, Brazil
- Dresden, Germany
- Genoa, Italy
- Hefei, China
- Herzliya, Israel
- Odense, Denmark
- Seville, Spain
- Tainan, Taiwan

== D ==
Dayton

- Augsburg, Germany
- Holon, Israel
- Monrovia, Liberia
- Ōiso, Japan
- Rushmoor, England, United Kingdom
- Salfit, Palestine
- Sarajevo, Bosnia and Herzegovina

Delaware

- Baumholder, Germany
- Omutninsk, Russia
- Sakata, Japan

Delphos

- Verl, Germany

== E ==
East Liverpool

- Stoke-on-Trent, England, United Kingdom

Englewood

- Billerbeck, Germany

Euclid

- Naraha, Japan

== F ==
Fremont

- Villa Hayes, Paraguay

== G ==
Green

- Beiuș, Romania

Grove City

- Lübtheen, Germany

== H ==
Huber Heights

- Rheinsberg, Germany

Hudson

- Landsberg am Lech, Germany

== K ==
Kent

- Dudince, Slovakia

Kettering

- Kettering, England, United Kingdom
- Steyr, Austria

== L ==
Lima

- Harima, Japan

== M ==
Mansfield

- Mansfield, England, United Kingdom
- Tamura, Japan

Marysville

- Yorii, Japan

Miamisburg

- Owen Sound, Canada

Middletown

- Ōsaki, Japan

Milan

- Yawata, Japan

Montgomery

- Neuilly-Plaisance, France

== N ==
New Knoxville

- Ladbergen, Germany

== O ==
Oakwood

- Outremont (Montreal), Canada
- Le Vésinet, France

Oberlin

- Ifẹ, Nigeria

Oxford

- Differdange, Luxembourg

== P ==
Portsmouth

- Great Corby, England, United Kingdom
- Orizaba, Mexico
- Zittau, Germany

== R ==
Richfield

- Wolfach, Germany

Russells Point

- Ourém, Portugal

== S ==
Shaker Heights

- Volzhsky, Russia

South Euclid

- Kraljevo, Serbia

Springfield

- Casey, Australia
- Kragujevac, Serbia
- Pitești, Romania
- Wittenberg, Germany

St. Marys

- Awaji, Japan
- Lienen, Germany

Sylvania

- Woodstock, Canada

== T ==
Toledo

- Coburg, Germany
- Coimbatore, India
- Ferrara, Italy
- Hyderabad, Pakistan
- Londrina, Brazil
- Nanchong, China
- Poznań, Poland
- Qinhuangdao, China
- Szeged, Hungary
- Tanga, Tanzania
- Toledo, Spain
- Toyohashi, Japan

Troy

- Takahashi, Japan

== V ==
Van Wert

- Sumoto, Japan

Vandalia

- Lichtenfels, Germany
- Prestwick, Scotland, United Kingdom

Vermilion

- Paimpol, France

== W ==
Wapakoneta

- Lengerich, Germany

Warren

- Acre, Israel

Wellington

- Crieff, Scotland, United Kingdom

West Carrollton

- Vidin, Bulgaria

Westlake

- Kingsville, Canada
- (Republic of Ireland) Tralee, Ireland

Worthington

- Sayama, Japan

Wooster

- Collepietro, Italy

== Y ==
Yellow Springs

- El Jícaro, Nicaragua

Youngstown

- Acre, Israel
- Spišská Nová Ves, Slovakia
