= Ohio Youth Problems, Functioning and Satisfaction Scales (Ohio scales) =

Questionnaires to assess the improvement of child mental health patients

The Ohio Youth Problems, Functioning, Satisfaction Scales (Ohio Scales) are a set of parent-reported and self-reported questionnaires, consisting of four scales used to assess the improvement and outcomes of children and adolescents who have received mental health services.

The assessment takes approximately 15 minutes to complete, and is designed to assess children between the ages of 5 and 18.

The Ohio scales have been shown to be a valid and reliable predictor of a child's response to treatment.

== See also ==
- Mental health
