= Ohio Alliance for Public Charter Schools =

Defunct education advocacy group

- Formation: 2006; 20 years ago
- Dissolved: December 31, 2016; 9 years ago
- Headquarters: Columbus, Ohio
- Members: 200 (2016)

The Ohio Alliance for Public Charter Schools was a nonprofit membership association based in Columbus, Ohio that was formed in 2006. It was composed of more than 200 charter school and related organizational members. It provides advocacy and technical support services for member schools.

The organization was founded with initial grants from the Walton Family Foundation, the Bill and Melinda Gates Foundation, the Fisher Fund and the National Alliance for Public Charter Schools Bill Sims was its founding president and CEO from 2006 to 2014. The current president and CEO is RaShaun Holliman.

The Ohio Alliance for Public Charter Schools purported to focus on improving the quality of charter schools in Ohio through its technical support and performance management programs. The Alliance organized a national conference in 2010, funded by the Bill and Melinda Gates Foundation, to exhibit promising cooperative programs between traditional school districts and charter schools and it remains a repository for such collaborative practices throughout the United States.

The organization was disbanded at the end of 2016.
