= Crescent Machine Company =

Crescent Machine

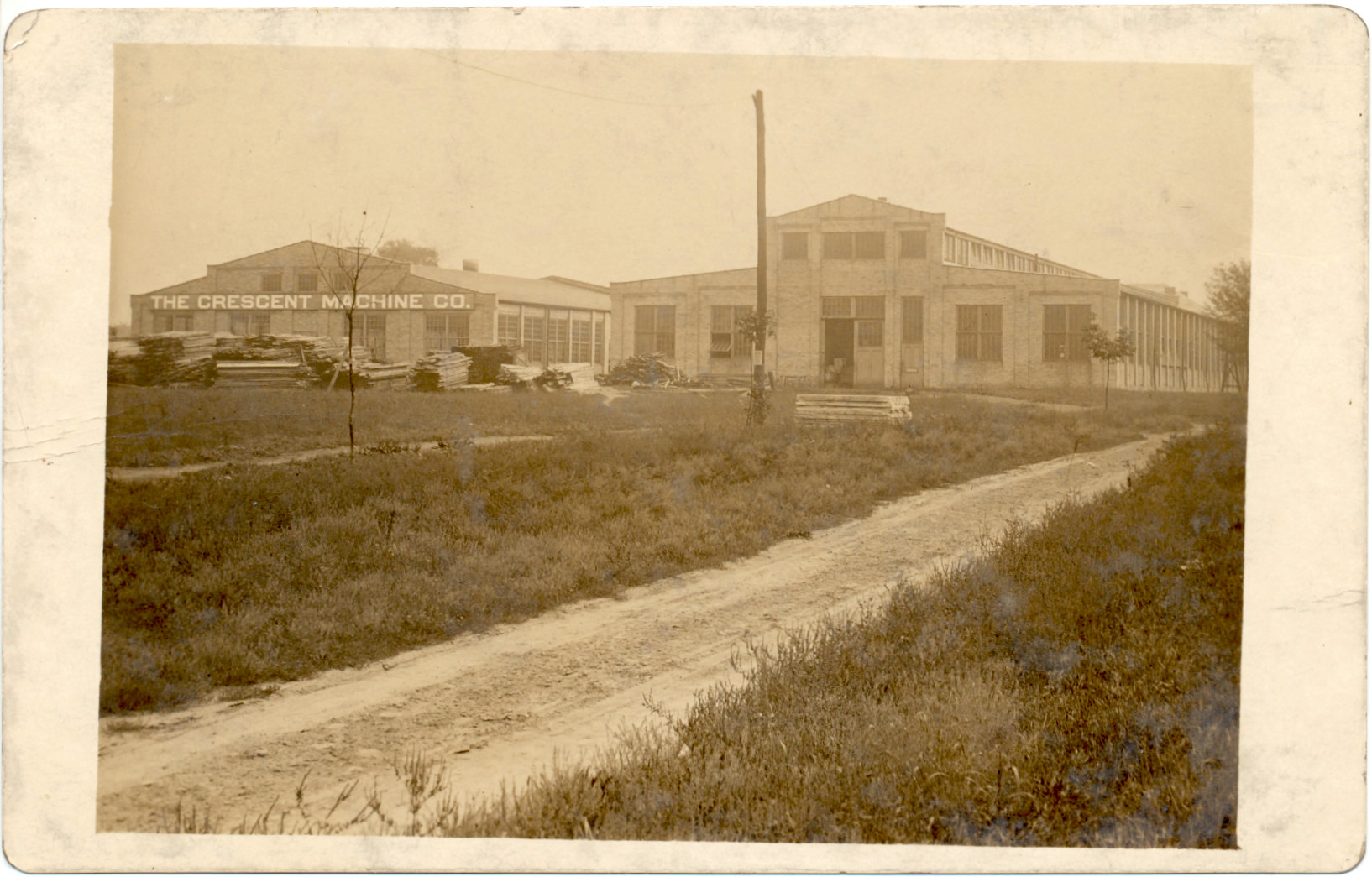
Postcard of Crescent Machine Company.

Crescent Machine Company was founded in Leetonia, Ohio in 1893. It manufactured a line of industrial woodworking machinery, particularly band saws. In 1940, it was bought by Pittsburgh Equitable Meter and Manufacturing Company, which became the Rockwell Manufacturing Company in 1946.

Third party website: http://wiki.vintagemachinery.org/CrescentHistory.ashx
