= List of mammals of Ohio =

This is a list of mammals of Ohio.

== Native species ==
There are 66 native mammal species of Ohio.

Native mammal species of Ohio
Common name	Binomial name	Status	Picture
Virginia opossum	Didelphis virginiana	Extant	
Northern short-tailed shrew	Blarina brevicauda	Extant	
North American least shrew	Cryptotis parva	Extant	
Masked shrew	Sorex cinereus	Extant	
Smoky shrew	Sorex fumeus	Extant	
American pygmy shrew	Sorex hoyi	Extant	[data missing]
Star-nosed mole	Condylura cristata	Extant	
Hairy-tailed mole	Parascalops breweri	Extant	
Eastern mole	Scalopus aquaticus	Extant	
Rafinesque's big-eared bat	Corynorhinus rafinesquii	Extant	
Big brown bat	Eptesicus fuscus	Extant	
Silver-haired bat	Lasionycteris noctivagans	Extant	
Eastern red bat	Lasiurus borealis	Extant	
Hoary bat	Lasiurus cinereus	Extant	
Eastern small-footed bat	Myotis leibii	Extant	
Little brown bat	Myotis lucifugus	Extant	
Northern long-eared bat	Myotis septentrionalis	Extant	
Indiana bat	Myotis sodalis	Extant	
Evening bat	Nycticeius humeralis	Extant	
Tricolored bat	Perimyotis subflavus	Extant	
Snowshoe hare	Lepus americanus	Locally extinct	Summer coat Winter coat
Eastern cottontail	Sylvilagus floridanus	Extant	
Southern flying squirrel	Glaucomys volans	Extant	
Thirteen-lined ground squirrel	Ictidomys tridecemlineatus	Extant	
Woodchuck / groundhog	Marmota monax	Extant	
Eastern gray squirrel	Sciurus carolinensis	Extant	
Fox squirrel	Sciurus niger	Extant	
Eastern chipmunk	Tamias striatus	Extant	
American red squirrel	Tamiasciurus hudsonicus	Extant	
North American beaver	Castor canadensis	Extant	
Woodland jumping mouse	Napaeozapus insignis	Extant	
Meadow jumping mouse	Zapus hudsonius	Extant	
Prairie vole	Microtus ochrogaster	Extant	
Eastern meadow vole	Microtus pennsylvanicus	Extant	
Woodland vole	Microtus pinetorum	Extant	
Southern red-backed vole	Clethrionomys gapperi	Extant	
Allegheny woodrat	Neotoma magister	Locally extinct	
Muskrat	Ondatra zibethicus	Extant	
Marsh rice rat	Oryzomys palustris	Locally extinct	
White-footed mouse	Peromyscus leucopus	Extant	
Eastern deer mouse	Peromyscus maniculatus	Extant	
Eastern harvest mouse	Reithrodontomys humulis	Extant	
Southern bog lemming	Synaptomys cooperi	Extant	
North American porcupine	Erethizon dorsatum	Extant	
Eastern wolf	Canis lycaon	Locally extinct	
Red wolf	Canis rufus	Locally extinct	Captive male red wolf - 6189897794
Gray fox	Urocyon cinereoargenteus	Extant	
Red fox	Vulpes vulpes	Extant	
American black bear	Ursus americanus	Extant	
Raccoon	Procyon lotor	Extant	
North American river otter	Lontra canadensis	Extant	
American marten	Martes americana	Locally extinct	
Wolverine	Gulo gulo	Locally extinct	Rosomák sibiřský (Gulo gulo)
Least weasel	Mustela nivalis	Extant	
American ermine	Mustela richardsonii	Extant	
Long-tailed weasel	Neogale frenata	Extant	
American mink	Neogale vison	Extant	
Fisher	Pekania pennanti	Extant	
American badger	Taxidea taxus	Extant	
Striped skunk	Mephitis mephitis	Extant	
Bobcat	Lynx rufus	Extant	
Canada lynx	Lynx canadensis	Locally extinct	
Eastern cougar	Puma concolor couguar	Globally extinct	
Plains bison	Bison bison bison	Locally extinct	
Eastern elk	Cervus canadensis canadensis	Globally extinct	
Northern white-tailed deer	Odocoileus virginianus borealis	Extant	Male (buck or stag) Female (doe) with juveniles (fawns)

== Non-native species ==
There are 5 non-native mammal species in Ohio.

Non-native mammal species in Ohio
Common name	Binomial name	Picture
Coyote (Note: While coyotes are native to the contiguous United States as a whole, they only first appeared in Ohio in 1919. The eastward expansion of coyotes out of their native range was caused by the human-driven extinction of local apex predators (gray wolves, eastern wolves, and cougars) and the conversion of previously forested areas into farmland.)	Canis latrans	
Wild boar	Sus scrofa	
House mouse	Mus musculus	
Brown rat	Rattus norvegicus	
Black rat	Rattus rattus	

== See also ==
- Lists of mammals by region
- List of U.S. state mammals
- List of birds of Ohio
