= Electoral reform in Ohio =

Electoral reform in Ohio refers to efforts to change the voting laws in Ohio. The official in charge of voting procedures in the state of Ohio is the Secretary of State.

With regard to the disenfranchisement of African-Americans, the State Assembly first allowed challenges at polling places in 1831. By 1859, persons possessing a "visible admixture of African blood" could possibly be denied the right to vote.

Representative Dennis Kucinich also declared that there were issues with voter suppression in Ohio during the 2004 United States presidential election:

Dirty tricks occurred across the state, including phony letters from Boards of Elections telling people that their registration through some Democratic activist groups were invalid and that Kerry voters were to report on Wednesday because of massive voter turnout. Phone calls to voters giving them erroneous polling information were also common.
