= Cuisine of Ohio =

Food from the state of Ohio, US

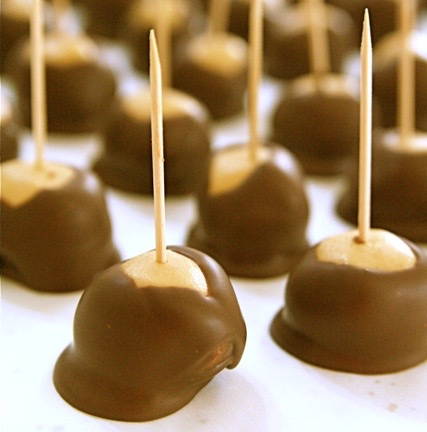
Buckeye candy

The cuisine of Ohio is part of the broader regional cuisine of the Midwestern United States and reflects the influence of German, Italian, Eastern European, and other communities. Some foods are associated with specific cities of Ohio; for example, sauerkraut balls in Akron, Polish Boy sandwiches in Cleveland, Johnny Marzetti casserole in Columbus, and Cincinnati chili. Other local specialties include fried bologna sandwiches, buckeye candies, and at least four regional pizza styles. Annual festivals include the Ohio State Fair, Oktoberfest Zinzinnati, and the Circleville Pumpkin Show. In addition to local restaurants like Schmidt's Sausage Haus and Swenson's drive-in, Ohio hosts the headquarters of nationwide companies like Smucker's, Wendy's, and White Castle.

== History ==
=== Indigenous history ===
Northeastern Ohio was originally inhabited by nomadic paleo-Indians who hunted animals like deer, wild turkeys, and bears and gathered plants like nuts and berries. Between the year 1000 and 1600 CE, the indigenous people in the area increasingly lived in villages where they grew plants like corn, squash, and beans. They also consumed river mollusks, beaver, elk, ducks, nuts, and berries.

By the mid-19th century, European settlers had forced most indigenous people to leave, and today there are no federally recognized tribes in Ohio.

=== 18th century ===
In the late 18th century, European settlers began moving into the area where they ate salt pork, corn, and whatever they could hunt, especially deer and wild turkey. Settlers planted beans, pumpkins, and melons but initially struggled to grow wheat. Hogs were slaughtered in December and the pork was preserved to eat throughout the year, most commonly through brining in a pork barrel.

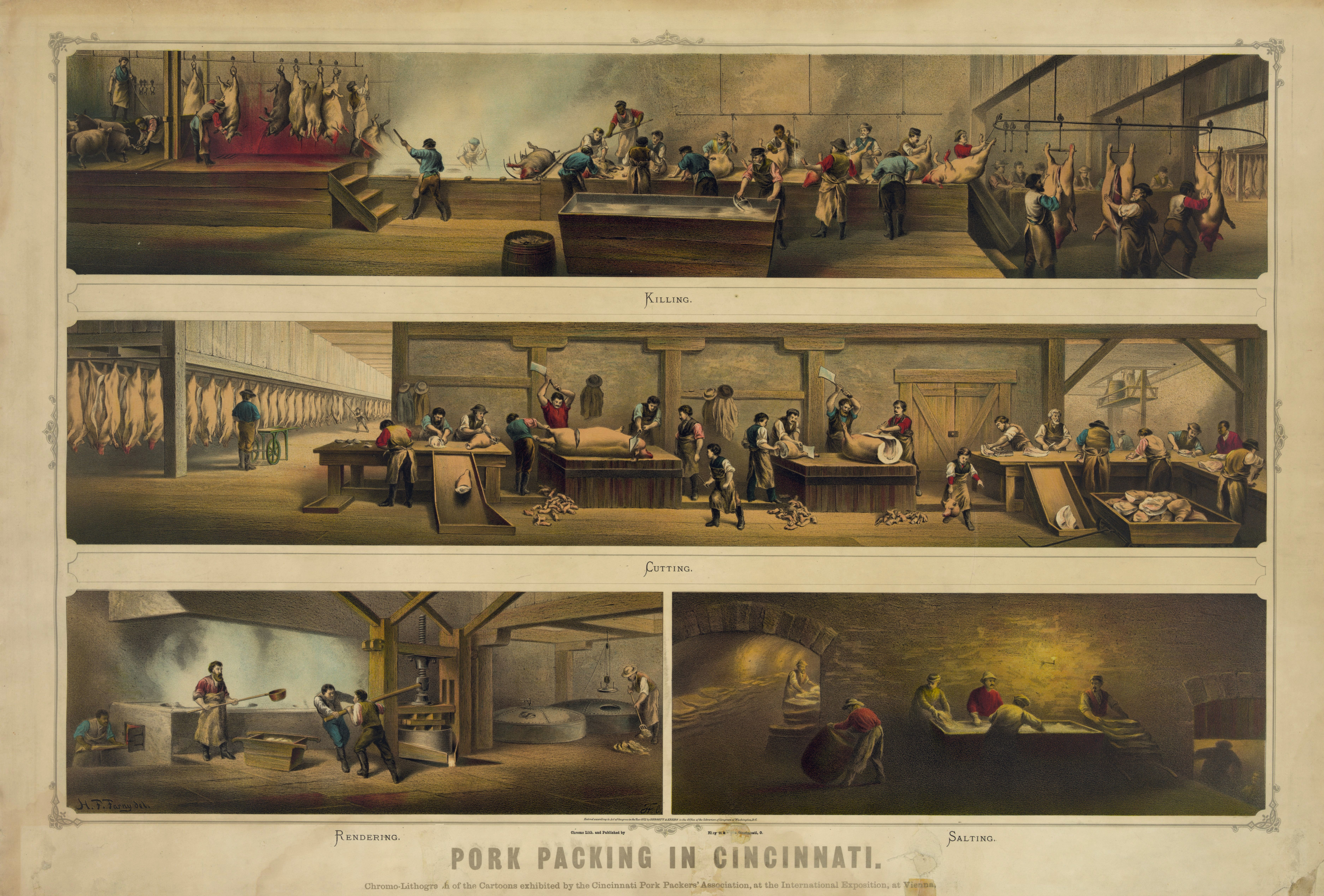
Pork packing in Cincinnati. Print from 1873 showing four scenes in a packing house: "Killing, Cutting, Rendering, [and] Salting."

=== 19th century ===
By the mid-19th century, Cincinnati had become the center of pork production in the US and was dubbed "Porkopolis". Thousands of pigs were brought from farms into the city by foot, train, and boat. Due to the lack of refrigeration, they were slaughtered and packed in winter. In 1860, at the height of the pork industry in Cincinnati, it was estimated that 2,400 workers killed 450,000 pigs. After the completion of the transcontinental railroad in 1868, the pork industry became dominated by Chicago, which was more accessible to pig farmers, especially those in the Great Plains. The flying pig has since become a symbol of Cincinnati.

Ohio is the birthplace of the modern tomato. In 1870, after years of selective breeding, Alexander W. Livingston developed the Paragon tomato, which became the first widely sold tomato variety in the US. Before the Paragon, tomatoes were "small, ribbed, hard cored, and almost hollow". His seed company, located in Columbus, eventually developed over 30 tomato varieties, which accounted for about half of major tomato varieties grown in the US by 1910.

== Dishes by city ==
=== Akron ===
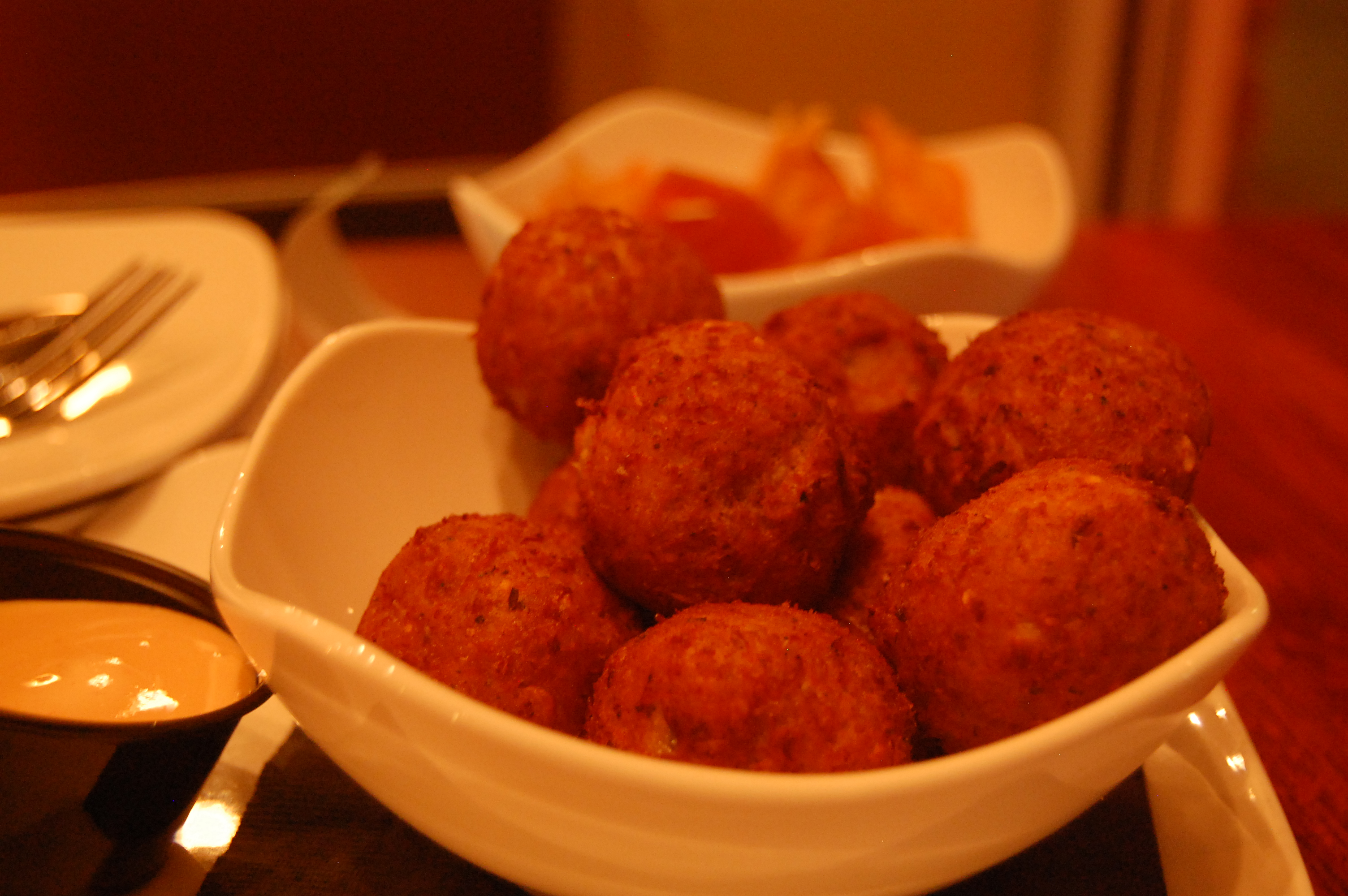
Sauerkraut balls

Sauerkraut balls were voted Akron's official dish in 1996. One local manufacturer has compared Akron's relationship to sauerkraut balls to Buffalo's relationship to buffalo wings or Philadelphia's relationship to Philly cheese steaks. In general, they are fritters containing sauerkraut, ground meat, and a binder such as cream cheese; they may have other ingredients mixed in or be accompanied with dipping sauces. According to multiple sources, German or Polish immigrants originally created sauerkraut balls in Akron. However, the book Akron Family Recipes states that the dish was first served in the 1940s at a German restaurant in Cleveland. Typically an appetizer or a holiday food, sauerkraut balls are also eaten in other Ohio cities like Cincinnati.

In the 1960s, two Lebanese immigrants developed a recipe for pressure cooking seasoned potato wedges which they dubbed JoJo's. Today, JoJo's are still sold at their restaurant, Fiesta Pizza and Chicken, and other chicken restaurants across Akron. The origin of JoJo's is unclear as cooks from elsewhere in the US have also taken credit for creating them.

White French is a creamy salad dressing distinct from French dressing and considered to be "uniquely Akron". White French is often mayonnaise-based and made with mustard, onion, white vinegar, and sugar. Some versions have a mild garlic flavor. Sold at longstanding local restaurants like Ken Stewart's Grille and Papa Joe's, it is often served on a wedge salad.

Barberton chicken was brought to the greater Akron area in the 1930s by a family of Serbian immigrants who opened a restaurant in Barberton called Belgrade Gardens. Seasoned primarily with salt, the chicken is breaded, chilled overnight, and then deep fried in lard at a low temperature. The chicken is typically served with a dish called hot rice or hot sauce, which consists of rice, tomato, hot peppers, and onions. Coleslaw and french fries are often included as well. Based on the pohovana piletina dish from Vojvodina, Barberton chicken is still sold at Belgrade Gardens and a few other Serbian restaurants in the area. The dish has been featured in the shows Food Feuds and Roadfood as well as the book Fried Chicken: An American Story by John T. Edge.

In 2012, the Akron Beacon Journal included sauerkraut balls and white French on its Taste of Akron Top 20 list. As part of its "Only in Akron" promotional series, the Akron RubberDucks baseball team has temporarily rebranded as the Akron JoJo's, the Akron Sauerkraut Balls, the Akron White French, and the Barberton Fried Chicken and Hot Rice.

=== Cincinnati ===
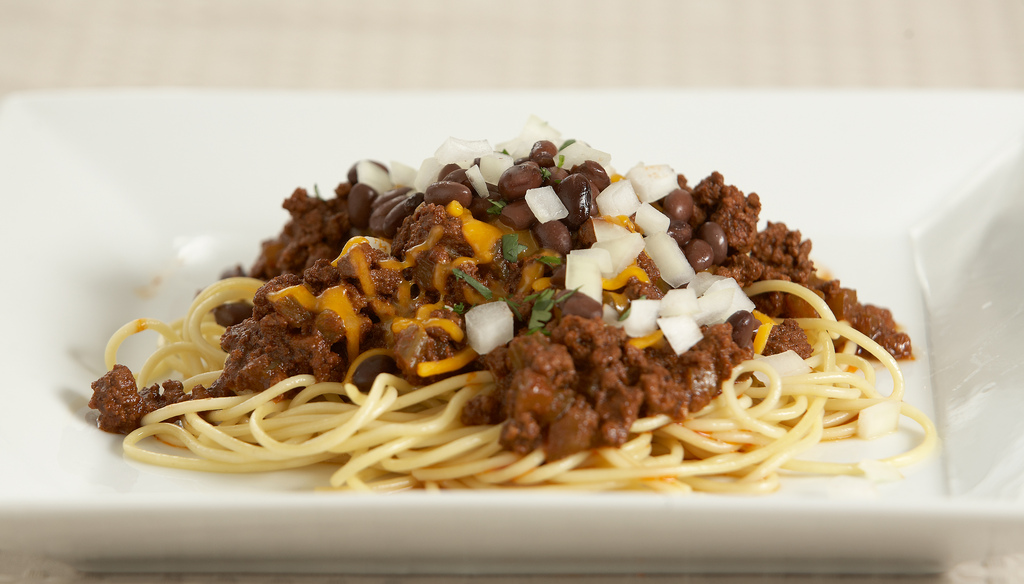
Cincinnati chili served over pasta

Local food historian Dann Woellert has referred to the "holy trinity" of Cincinnati cuisine, which consists of Cincinnati chili, mock turtle soup, and goetta.

Cincinnati chili is a Greek-inspired, seasoned meat sauce that is used as a topping for spaghetti or hot dogs. Additionally, red beans, chopped onions, and shredded cheese are offered as extra toppings referred to as "ways."

Once popular throughout the US, mock turtle soup is still eaten in Cincinnati. Cincinnati's mock turtle soup typically consists of lean beef, hard boiled eggs, ketchup, and lemon or vinegar. It has a similar texture to Cincinnati chili and has a sweet and sour flavor. Historically, the soup was especially popular with German immigrants and eaten in saloons in Over-the-Rhine. Local company Worthmore, founded in 1920, has sold canned mock turtle soup for decades.

German immigrants in Cincinnati invented goetta, a breakfast sausage made of meat scraps, spices, and oats. It is typically eaten fried.

Cottage ham, a regional term for smoked pork shoulder butt, is traditionally served with boiled potatoes and green beans. It is related to schäufele which German immigrants brought to Cincinnati in the 19th century. Local company Stehlin's Meats has been curing and smoking pork over hickory wood to make cottage ham with the same recipe since 1918.

=== Cleveland ===
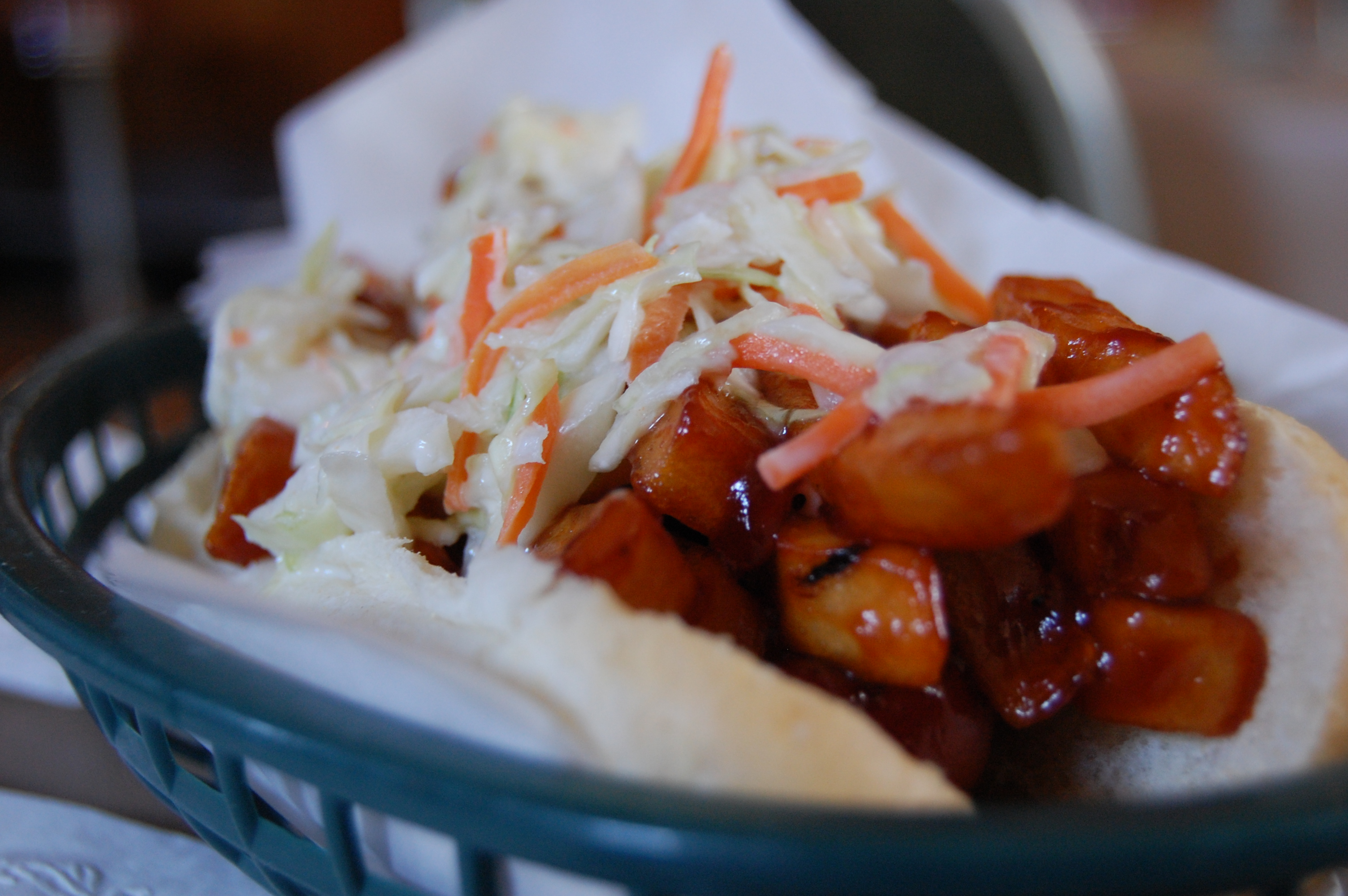
Polish Boy from Happy Dog in Cleveland

The Polish Boy, "the signature sandwich of Cleveland", is a kielbasa sausage topped with coleslaw, French fries, and barbecue sauce and served on a bun. Cleveland native and chef Michael Symon talked about the Polish Boy on the Food Network show "The best thing I ever ate".

Eastern European immigrants in the early 20th century introduced pierogi to Ohio, which have since become an essential part of Cleveland cuisine. According to some sources, the first known sale of pierogi in the US happened in 1928 to unemployed steel workers at the Marton House Tavern in Cleveland. Pierogi are dumplings traditionally stuffed with sauerkraut or potato and cheese, but Cleveland restaurants have developed new fillings like buffalo chickpeas, short ribs, and cottage cheese.

Clambakes are very popular in Northeast Ohio. A typical Northeast Ohio clam bake typically includes clams, chicken, sweet potatoes, corn, and other side dishes. Unlike in New England, seaweed is not used and the clams, chicken, and sweet potatoes are all steamed together in a large pot. John D. Rockefeller started the tradition in Ohio.

City chicken consists of cubes of meat, typically pork, which have been breaded, placed on a wooden skewer, fashioned into a drumstick shape, and then fried. It was created by Polish and Ukrainian communities during the Great Depression as a more affordable alternative to chicken. Other cities who historically had Eastern European communities also make this dish, although it has decreased in popularity due in part to the affordability of real chicken.

=== Columbus ===
Johnny Marzetti is a casserole dish thought to have originated from Columbus and consisting of some variation of noodles, ground beef, tomatoes, and cheese. According to local legend, it was originally created by the now-closed Marzetti's Restaurant in Columbus and named after the proprietor's brother in law. However, the T. Marzetti Company, which still sells food products developed by the restaurant, has said there is no evidence this origin story is true.

Wor sue gai is an American Chinese dish that two restaurants in Columbus claim to have invented. However, the dish may have been developed in Detroit.

== Other foods ==
=== Pizza ===
Ohio is home to several regional styles of pizza including Cleveland, Columbus, Dayton, Brier Hill, and Ohio Valley.

=== Bologna and ham ===
Restaurants across Ohio sell fried bologna sandwiches, leading Serious Eats to refer to the state as "the epicenter of the signature bologna sandwich". The sandwich is sold most famously at the G&R Tavern, located in Waldo, Ohio. Their sandwich features a thick slice of bologna produced by a meatpacking company in Columbus according to the G&R Tavern's secret recipe. The bologna is fried and then topped with sweet pickles, raw onion, and Monterey Jack cheese. The "Sure to be Famous" sold at Harmar's Tavern in Marietta, features similar ingredients with the addition of iceberg lettuce and tomatoes.

Troyer's trail bologna is a wood-smoked all-beef ring bologna that has been produced in Trail, Ohio, by the Troyer family since 1912. Inspired by German sausages, it is often eaten in slices by itself or with cheese. Flavors include cheddar cheese and hot pepper.

Popularized by Isaly's, chipped chopped ham is a lunchmeat made by combining finely chopped ham, seasoning, and pork trimmings into a loaf. The loaf is often thin-sliced, cooked with barbecue sauce, and piled on a bun. The dish is also associated with Pittsburgh.

=== Other ===
The shredded chicken sandwich consists of shredded chicken and cream of chicken soup cooked for several hours, often in a slow cooker, and thickened with ingredients like potato chips, flour, or crackers. The resulting mixture is served on a bun. A uniquely Ohioan dish, it was created as a way to make the tough meat of older chickens more palatable. It is also known as the sloppy bird, creamed chicken, and pressed chicken.

Buckeyes are a candy similar to peanut butter cups. Coated in chocolate, with a partially exposed center of peanut butter fudge, the candy resembles the nut that grows on the state tree, the Ohio buckeye. According to one story, the buckeye was first created by a reporter for a Columbus newspaper who was trying to recreate the chocolate-covered peanut balls her mother-in-law had made for Christmas. When one of the balls she made was left partially uncovered by the chocolate dipping sauce, she observed that it looked like a buckeye nut. The term Buckeye is also used to refer to desserts featuring both chocolate and peanut butter, e.g. Buckeye Donuts or Buckeye Brownies.

== Events and festivals ==
The Ohio State Fair has occurred almost every year since 1850, with breaks for World War II and COVID-19. It was held in various locations across Ohio until 1886 when it permanently moved to the Ohio Expo Center & State Fairgrounds in Columbus. According to fair records, the fair sold 139,553 slices of pizza; 96,657 corn dogs; and 37,335 ears of roasted corn in 2016. In 2023, over a million people attended the fair.

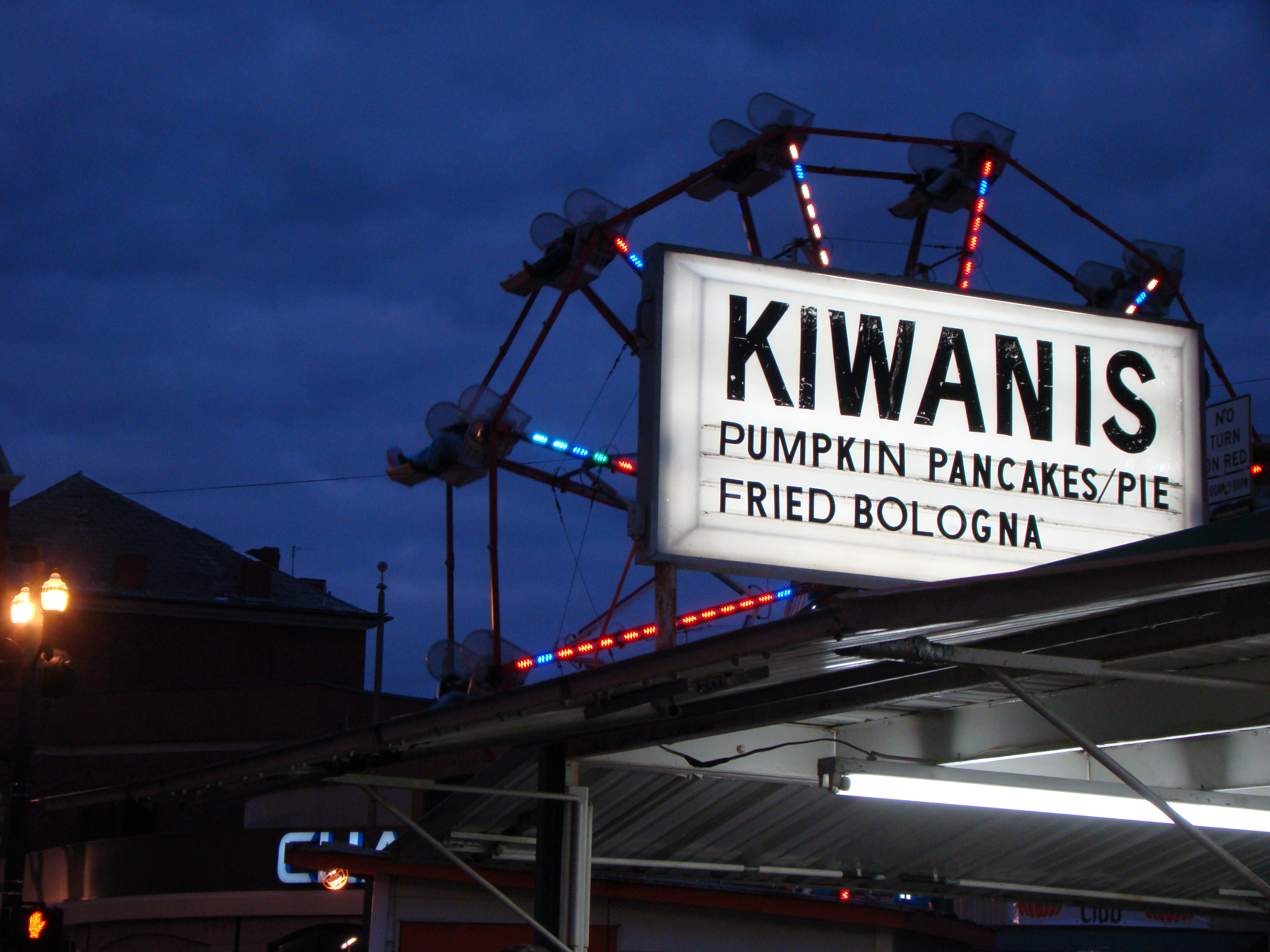
Circleville Pumpkin Show, 2011

Between 1970 and 2023, the annual Sauerkraut Festival in Waynesville has expanded from 528 pounds of sauerkraut and 1500 attendees to over 11,000 pounds of sauerkraut and more than 350,000 attendees. Reubens, brownies, bratwurst, pizza, and other foods featuring sauerkraut are sold. One especially popular food is the "German sundae", a dish of mashed potatoes loaded with cheese, bacon, sour cream, and sauerkraut and topped with an olive in place of a Maraschino cherry.

Oktoberfest Zinzinnati, the largest Oktoberfest celebration in the US and Taste of Cincinnati, the longest running culinary arts festival in the US, were both founded in the 1970s. Goettafest is held annually in Newport, Kentucky, across the Ohio River from Cincinnati. The event sells pizza, nachos, burgers, and other foods featuring goetta.

The annual Pawpaw Festival in Albany celebrates the native state fruit. The Circleville Pumpkin Show, founded in 1903, sells foods featuring pumpkin including chili, waffles, ice cream, burgers, and pie. Since 2022, an annual Pierogi Week has been held in Cleveland.

== Ethnic enclaves ==
- Asiatown in Cleveland
- German Village in Columbus
- Over-the-Rhine in Cincinnati

== Businesses ==
=== Local restaurants ===
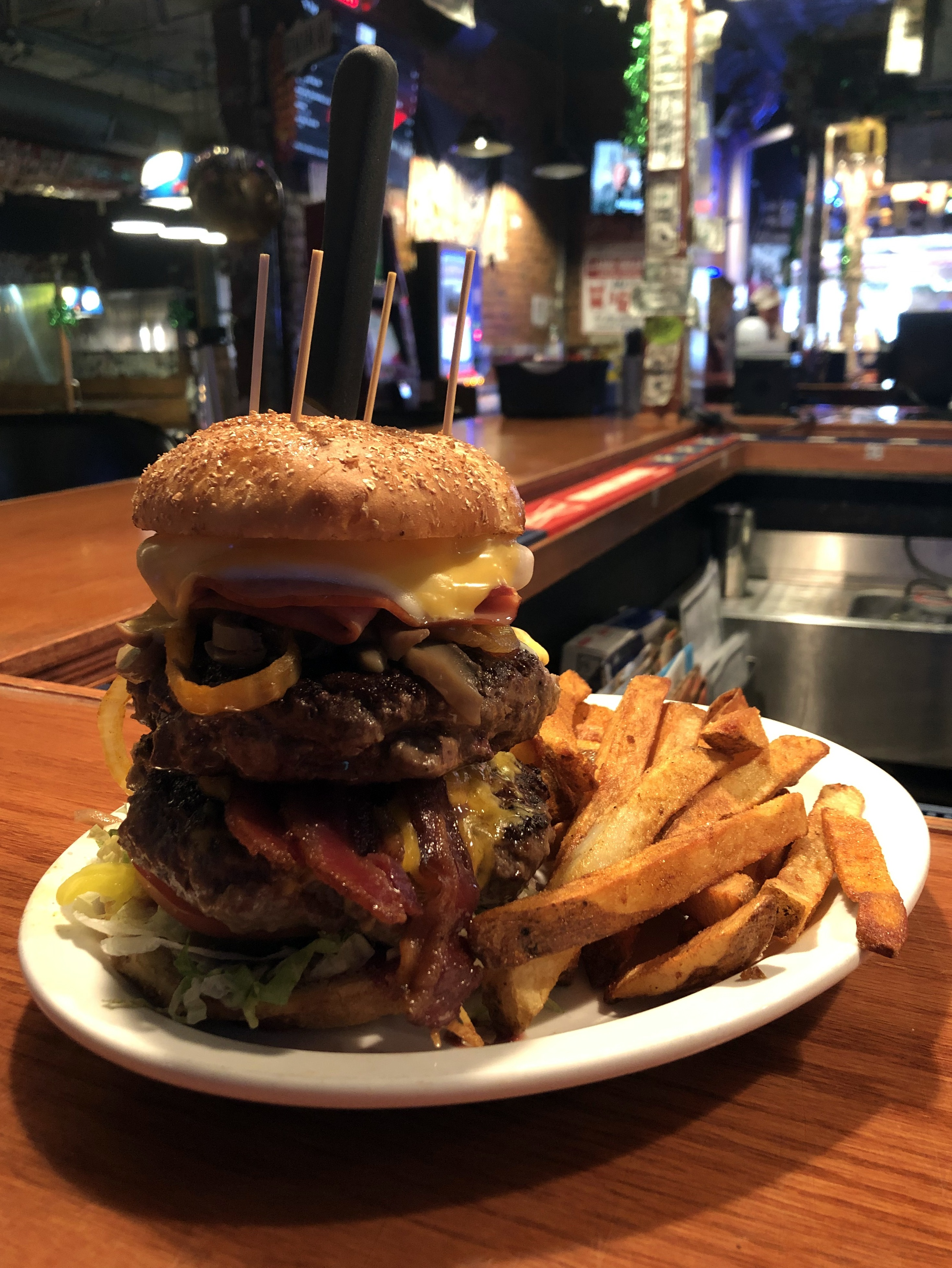
Thurmanator served at Son of Thurman in Delaware, Ohio.

Schmidt's Sausage Haus, in Columbus, has sold German-American cuisine since 1967. They are famous for their cream puffs, which they also sell at the Ohio State Fair.

Skyline Chili and Gold Star Chili are regional restaurant chains that make Cincinnati chili.

Founded in Akron in 1934, Swensons is a drive-in restaurant chain selling food like burgers, shakes, fried bologna sandwiches, and sloppy joes. Their Galley Boy is a double cheeseburger with two special sauces similar to tartar sauce and barbecue sauce. Reader's Digest has designated it the best hamburger in Ohio, and it was included in Business Insider's list of "The 50 best burger joints in America".

Thurman Cafe in Columbus is also known for its hamburgers. The Thurmanator, consists of two 12 oz beef patties, topped with bacon, ham, tomato, onions, pickles, banana peppers, mushrooms, and three cheeses. The family-owned restaurant was featured on Man v. Food. In 2014, a fourth-generation descendant of the founder opened a similar restaurant called Son of Thurman in Delaware, Ohio.

One of Cleveland's oldest restaurants, Guarino's has been serving Italian food like chicken picatta, lasagna, braciole, and veal saltimbocca for over a hundred years. Dean Martin was a frequent customer in the 1940s.

=== Nationwide companies ===
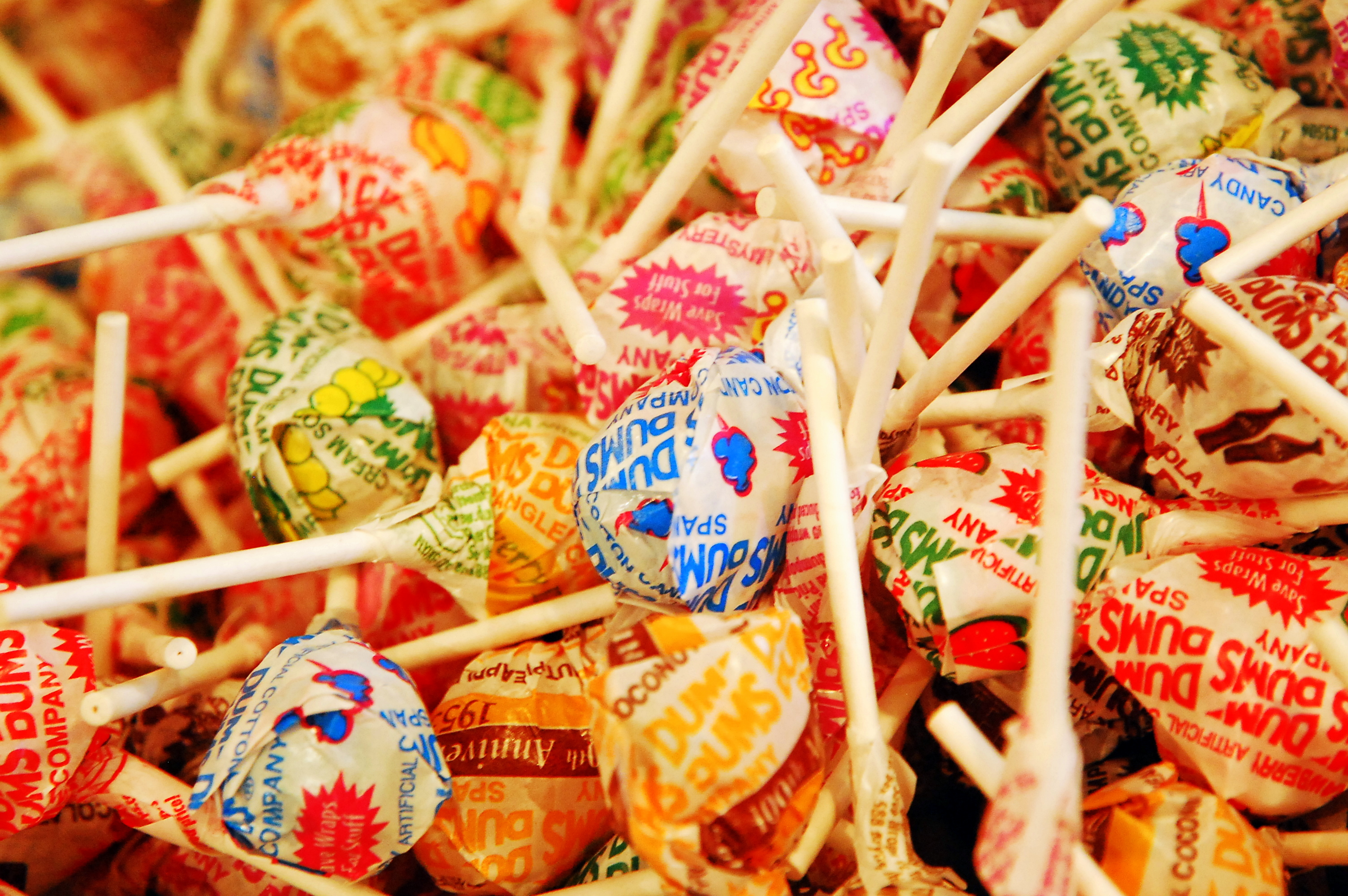
Dum Dums.

Ohio has hosted a number of nationwide food companies. Smucker's, founded in 1897, is still headquartered in Orville. In 1924, the first Stewart's opened in Mansfield. Ten years later, White Castle moved its headquarters from Wichita to Columbus. Between 1964 and 1982, Ohio saw the first Arby's, Wendy's, and Buffalo Wild Wings.

In 1902, Isaly Dairy Company began selling milk in Mansfield, soon expanding their product line to include ice cream. The company started selling Klondike bars in 1922. Originally hand-dipped in chocolate, the Klondike bar was priced at 10 cents to be affordable to the working class. Over the years Isaly expanded sales and production of the Klondike bar, eventually rolling out nationwide distribution in the 1980s and selling it to Unilever in 1993.

In 1924, the Akron Candy Co. began making Dum Dums lollipops in Bellevue. The lollipops were named for and designed to look like dum dum bullets. Since 1953, the lollipops have been made by Spangler in Bryan.
