= Chocolate balls =

Spherical confections made of or dipped into chocolate

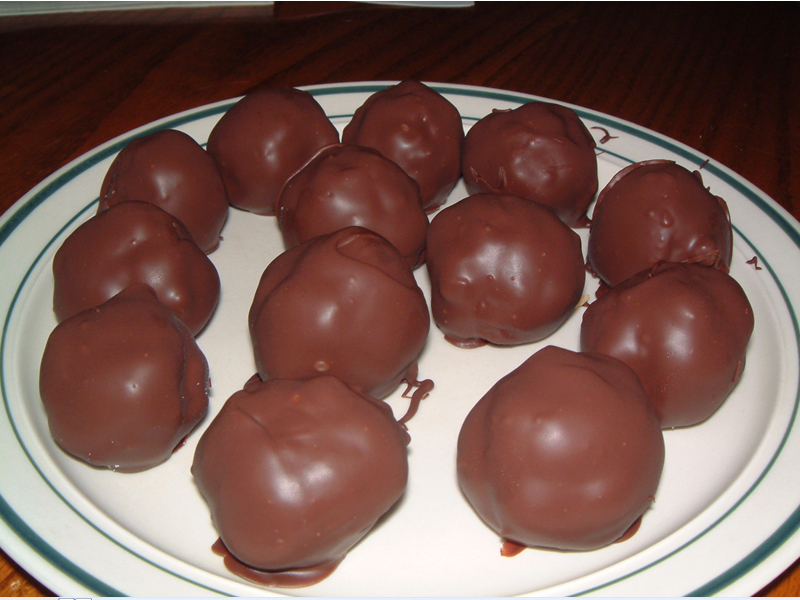
- Type: Confectionery
- Main ingredients: Chocolate

Chocolate balls are a spherical confection made of or dipped into chocolate. Other ingredients may include peanut butter or marzipan.

In Nordic countries, most notably Sweden, Denmark, Finland and Iceland, chokladboll or kokosbollar are chocolate balls mostly covered in desiccated coconut. They can also be covered in for example sprinkles and nuts.

== See also ==
- Bossche bol
- Brigadeiro
- Buckeye candy
