= Buckeye (candy) =

Chocolate-covered peanut butter candy

Buckeyes
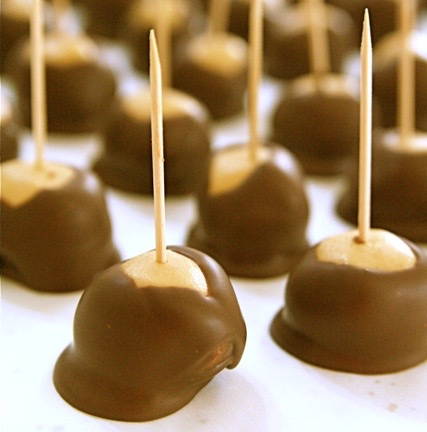
- Buckeye
- Type: Confectionery
- Place of origin: United States
- Region or state: Ohio
- Main ingredients: Peanut butter, chocolate
- Food energy (per serving): 100 kcal (420 kJ)

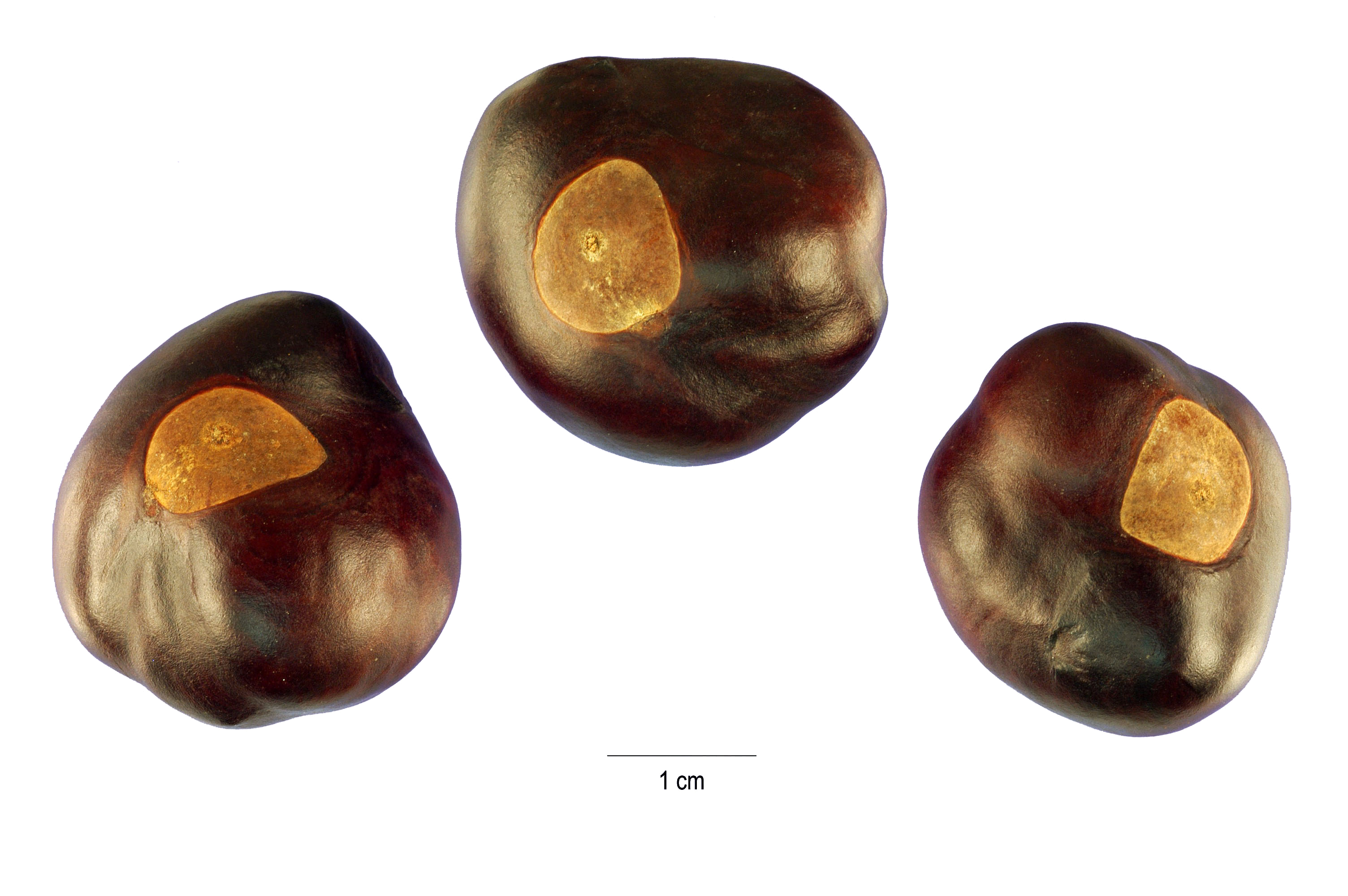
Dried buckeye nuts

Buckeyes are confections made from a peanut butter fudge partially dipped in chocolate to leave a circle of peanut butter visible. Buckeyes are similar to peanut butter balls (or peanut-butter-filled chocolate balls), which are completely covered in chocolate. While similar to the more widely known Reese's cup, the buckeye has a higher ratio of peanut butter to chocolate and a smoother texture due to the use of powdered sugar to make the peanut butter into a fudge. Buckeye candies are also often stored in the fridge or freezer giving a snap to the chocolate coating.

Named for their resemblance to the poisonous nut of the Ohio buckeye tree, the state tree of Ohio, this candy is particularly popular in Ohio and neighboring states.

It is common for Ohioans to make buckeyes at home, but they are also available in mail-order catalogs and candy shops.

The dessert is not known prior to the 1960s or 1970s, originally being prepared by home cooks in their kitchens. One recipe included butter, crunchy or creamy peanut butter, powdered sugar, and chocolate chips. Peanut butter and butter are blended and powdered sugar is added gradually before it is rolled into small balls and dipped in melted chocolate.

In 2025, the Ohio State Legislature passed a bill that would make the buckeye Ohio's official state candy.

== History ==
Despite recipes for chocolate-covered peanut butter confections dating back to the early 20th century, Ohio resident Gail Tabor is widely credited with the creation of candy as it is recognized today. In 1964, Tabor was making candy from her mother's recipe for chocolate-covered peanut butter candies. When dipping the candy into the chocolate, the candy did not cover the peanut butter ball completely; her husband commented that it looked like the buckeye nut. She continued to make the candies this way for years for the annual OSU–Michigan football game in support of the OSU Buckeyes. Despite Tabor's refusal to share the recipe, the recipe appeared in the Ohio State Alumni Magazine in 1973 with the recipe attributed to a friend. In 1983, Tabor wrote an article for the Arizona Republic newspaper to re-claim her authorship of the recipe, outline the backstory, and share her recipe for the candies, Buckeye Balls.

== Popularity ==
Over 6 million pieces of the buckeye candy are produced and sold each year in addition to those made at home, and it regularly tops polls for favorite candies among its residents.

At the Anthony-Thomas Candy Company in Columbus, Ohio, buckeyes are their best selling candy, with over 24 million pieces sold in 2024, and their plant can produce up to 147,000 buckeyes per day. Showcasing the buckeye's wider appeal, the buckeye candies from Anthony-Thomas have been featured on multiple outlets, including Good Morning America, Fox Sports, and QVC, where they sold out. In 2023, the Anthony-Thomas Factory made the current world's largest buckeye, weighing in at 339 pounds (154 kg). The company keeps a 235-pound (107 kg) buckeye on display and for sale in their headquarters shop.

In 2019, USA Today's reader poll voted Marsha's Homemade Buckeyes as the Best Buckeye in Ohio. The company's buckeye candies are available in multiple grocery stores as well as Dollar General and Cracker Barrel stores across the United States.

Many stores carry the buckeye candies in Ohio and there are self-guided routes around the state to visit the many stores and sample the different buckeye options. In 2018, TourismOhio partnered with the Miami County Visitors Bureau to create an official map of over 30 shops throughout Ohio that produced and sold the buckeye candy. More buckeye candy themed trails have been created since, with the original trail from the Ohio tourism website now boasting over 40 stops in 2026.

In 2025, the Ohio State Legislature passed a bill to make the buckeye candy the official state candy. The legislation pointed to the candy's historical and cultural significance to the state, as well as the candy's association with regional pride.

== Variations ==
The traditional buckeye candy is composed of milk chocolate and peanut butter, but there are many variations to this standard recipe. One variation that is gaining popularity is adding ingredients to the center of the peanut butter ball. A shop in Columbus called The Buckeye Lady has gained local acclaim for her stuffed buckeye candies, with over 75 different flavors on offer. These stuffed buckeye variations are also sold at the OSU stadium during football games.

In 2022, a vendor at the Ohio State Fair offered a deep-fried buckeye that was offered wrapped in bacon and dusted with powdered sugar.

The candy has also inspired other treats flavored with the peanut butter and chocolate combination. Local Ohio ice creameries like Graeter's and Jeni's Spendid Ice Creams have both produced an ice cream homage to the buckeye. Throughout the state, stores offer buckeye-flavored coffee, pies, donuts, waffles, and granola, among others. The buckeye candy itself is also often added to milkshakes, cupcakes, sundaes, and even snack mixes.

There are also dog-safe options available using carob instead of dog-toxic chocolate and minimal sugar for dogs to enjoy.

== See also ==
- Chocolate balls
- Cuisine of the Midwestern United States
- Peanut butter cup
- List of peanut dishes
