= Isaly's =

American food processing company

- Industry: Food processing
- Founded: Mansfield, Ohio
- Founders: William Isaly
- Headquarters: Pittsburgh, Pennsylvania, United States
- Products: Deli & Dairy
- Website: Website

Isaly advertising art in the mid-1960s featured the Swiss Lad, a skyscraper cone and the tag line "Peak of Quality" as an allusion to the family-operated company's Swiss heritage.

Isaly's (/ˈaɪzliːz/) was a chain of family-owned dairies and restaurants started in Mansfield, Ohio, with locations throughout the American Midwest from the early 20th century until the 1970s. It is known today for its chipped chopped ham and for creating the Klondike Bar ice cream treat, popularized by the slogan "What would you do for a Klondike Bar?"

== History ==
The company was founded by William Isaly, grandson of Swiss immigrants who settled in Monroe County, Ohio, in the 19th century. By the early 1960s, the company boasted retail outlets that stretched from Pennsylvania to Iowa.

Isaly's early success was attributed to its loose company structure, which allowed for easy expansion without corporate overhead. William Isaly's first dairy was established in Mansfield, Ohio, where he acquired the Mansfield Pure Milk Company. Isaly expanded the core business from processing milk for sale to other grocers, to operating his own retail stores with milk, ice cream, bread and lunch counter service. Isaly also pioneered the idea of the modern convenience store by opening at least one outlet that also sold gasoline to motorists.

The first expansion of the business took the company to Marion, Ohio, after acquiring the Marion Pure Milk Company in 1914. Operated by Charles Isaly, the Marion operation was quickly modernized, and business grew accordingly. From Marion, the company expanded to Youngstown, Ohio, and by 1918 had a dairy and new headquarters on Mahoning Ave. The Youngstown area was the largest Isaly's market, boasting at one time almost 130 stores. In 1929 they expanded to Pittsburgh, Pennsylvania, (on the Blvd. of the Allies). Expansion continued through the 1930s and 1940s with additional dairies built from Columbus, Ohio (at North High Street and Arcadia Avenue) west to Iowa and 310 stores. Pittsburgh residents regarded Isaly's so highly that the company was and still is mistakenly considered a Pittsburgh original.

In its advertising, the dairies used the mnemonic phrase "I Shall Always Love You Sweetheart" to help with the spelling of the Isaly's name. In Marion, Ohio, Isaly's fielded an amateur basketball team that played against the Buffalo Silents – a team composed of deaf/mute players and LaRue, Ohio-based World-Famous Indians with Jim Thorpe.

In the 1930s, Isaly's began a commercial building program that employed high style Art Deco / Art Moderne designed production facilities and retail outlets, most of which were designed by architect Vincent (Shooey) Schoeneman. The Youngstown dairy facility represented the apex of this project, with the streamlined building (with exterior by architect Charles F. Owsley) dominated by a five-story glass block tower.

In addition to the Klondike Bar, the dairies were also known for their Skyscraper Cones, created in Youngstown by plant supervisor Sam Jennings which eschewed round ice cream scoops, instead using a patented design that resulted in a long, inverse-cone-shaped dip.

The company also had great success in selling chipped chopped ham, sliced (shaved) razor-thin for sandwiches. The sandwich was featured on the PBS special Sandwiches That You Will Like. The company also marketed "immunized milk for infants, supplied by special isolated herds of cattle".

Shifting consumer demands, declining sales for home-delivered milk, as well as corporate consolidation led to the closing of Isaly facilities beginning in the 1960s. According to Brian Butko, author of Klondikes, Chipped Ham, & Skyscraper Cones: The Story of Isaly's, it was the loose company structure – in an era of growing corporate homogeneity – that left Isaly's unable to compete on the wholesale and retail levels, leading to the closure of its dairies beginning in the mid-1960s.

Several members of the Isaly family attempted to continue to operate food-service operations. In Pittsburgh, Isaly outlets were converted to the "Sweet William" brand. In Ohio, restaurants operated under the "Isaly Shoppe" name until the mid-1990s when the final outlet closed in Marion, Ohio.

Since 1984, the Isaly's name has enjoyed a comeback of sorts, but one not overseen by members of the Isaly family. Delicatessen Distributing Incorporated of Evans City, Pennsylvania purchased the Isaly trademark name and markets luncheon meats, cheeses and sauces under the Isaly name in western Pennsylvania and eastern Ohio. The concern also distributes Isaly brand ice cream (except Klondikes) to stores in Western Pennsylvania. The Klondike Bar product line is now owned by Unilever.

There are at least three Isaly's still in operation in southwestern Pennsylvania in the areas of West View, Turtle Creek, and East Allegheny (city neighborhood of Pittsburgh), all retaining most of the classic interior. In June 2012, ownership of the West View Isaly's changed hands. The new owners have kept everything in the store intact but slightly changed the name to "I Shall Always Love You Sweetie", reflecting on Isaly's acronym. To punctuate this, periods have been added after each letter in the Isaly's storefront. The Isaly's in Turtle Creek was recently renamed Turtle Creek Market, but still retains the Isaly's name on the front facade and most of the interior motif. A former Isaly's franchise in New Brighton, Pennsylvania, which operated under the name "Bricker's Restaurant" after its Isaly's contract ended and continued to serve much of the Isaly's menu, closed in 2012 but reopened in late 2016 under new ownership as a convenience store and cafe, Main Street Market.

== Sources ==
- Butko, Brian. Klondikes, Chipped Ham, & Skyscraper Cones: The Story of Isaly's. Stackpole Books (July 2001). Mechanicsburg, Pennsylvania. 112 pp. ISBN 0-8117-2844-7.
- Koblentz, Stuart. "We Remember Isaly's". In, Marion (Images of America Series). Arcadia Publishing (November 2004). Mount Pleasant, South Carolina. 128 pp. ISBN 0-7385-3324-6.
