= Choc ice =

Frozen dessert

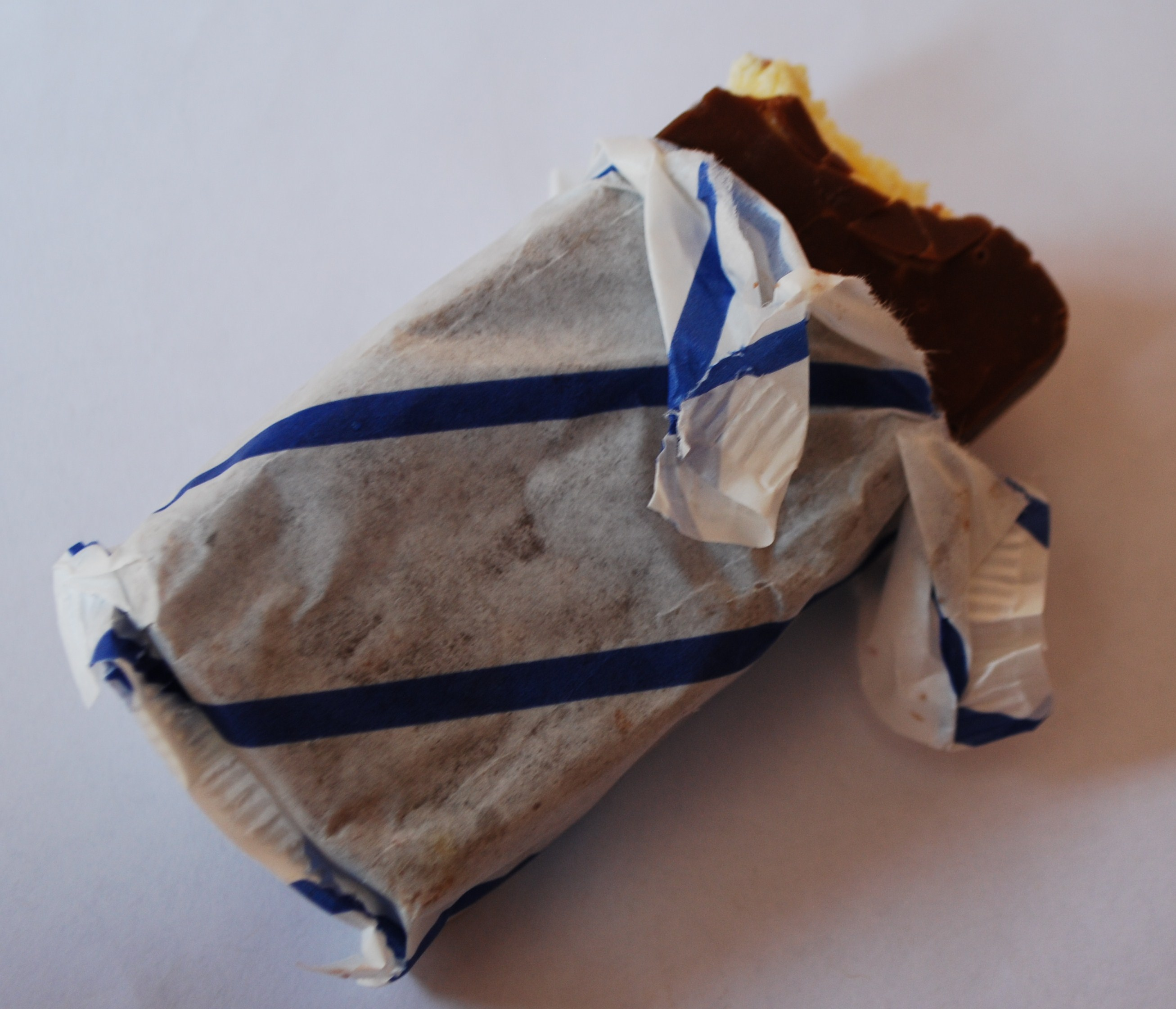
- Course: Dessert
- Serving temperature: Cold
- Main ingredients: Ice cream (typically vanilla flavour) chocolate

A choc ice (British English) or ice cream bar (American English) is a frozen dessert generally consisting of a rectangular block of ice cream—typically vanilla flavour, which is thinly coated with chocolate. Related products may also include other fillings with the ice cream and be styled similar to candy bars. The term has also been used as a racial slur.

== Description ==
A choc ice is a generic frozen dessert generally consisting of a rectangular block of ice cream—typically vanilla flavour—which is thinly coated with chocolate.

== History ==
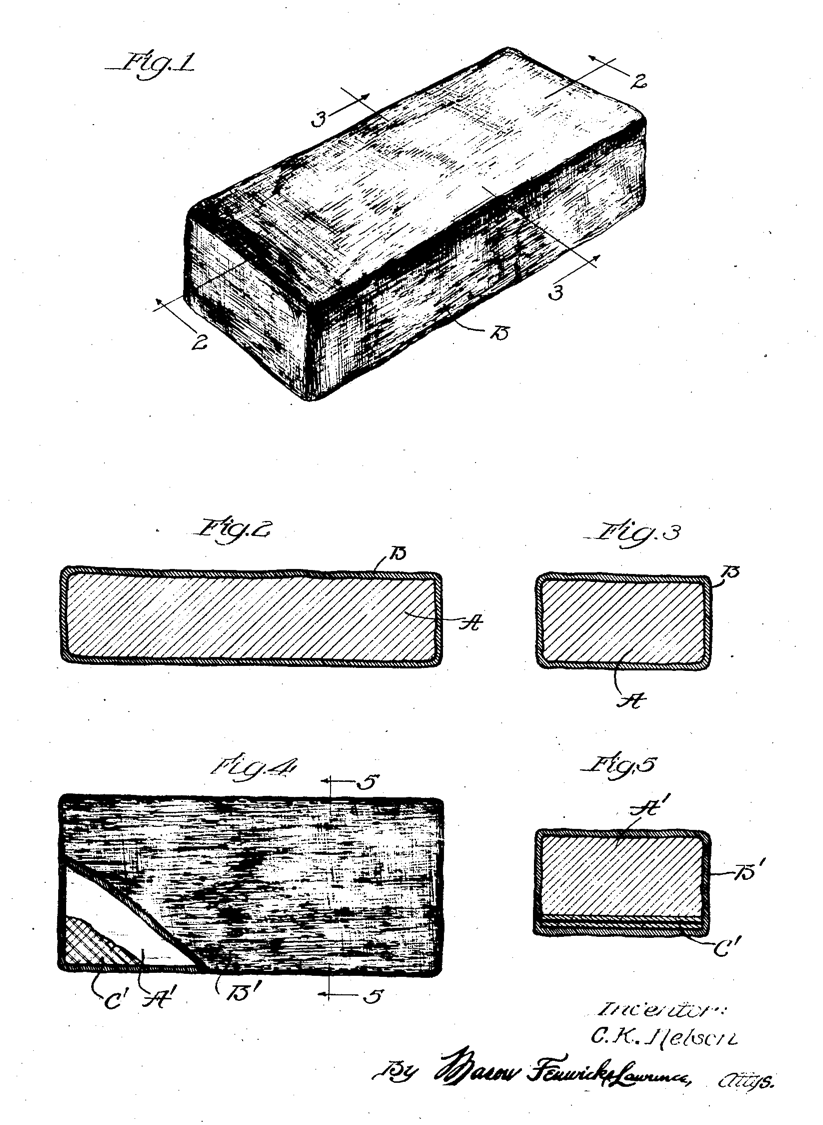
Nelson's drawing from his patent

Ice cream enrobed in chocolate was invented in the 1920s. Confectioner Harry Burt invented the chocolate-enrobed ice cream on a stick in 1920, and was granted a patent in 1923. In 1921, the Eskimo Pie chocolate bar was invented in Iowa by a pharmacy owner named Chris Nelson, who was inspired by a boy named Douglas Ressenden who could not decide between candy and ice cream; a patent was awarded in 1922, but invalidated in 1928. The Klondike bar was also invented in 1922. In Britain in the 1970s and 1980s choc ices were often jokingly referred to as the cheaper working class alternative to buying more expensive ice creams from ice cream vans.

== Brands ==
In many countries, there are numerous versions of this dessert which are produced under many different brand names.

A notable American brand is Klondike, which introduced its Klondike bar in the United States in 1922. Related products include frozen confections that enrobe fillings with the ice cream and appear similar to candy bars (e.g., Snickers ice cream bars).

== Slang ==
The term choc ice has also become a racial slur used to describe any person who is figuratively "black on the outside, white on the inside".
