= Guarino's =

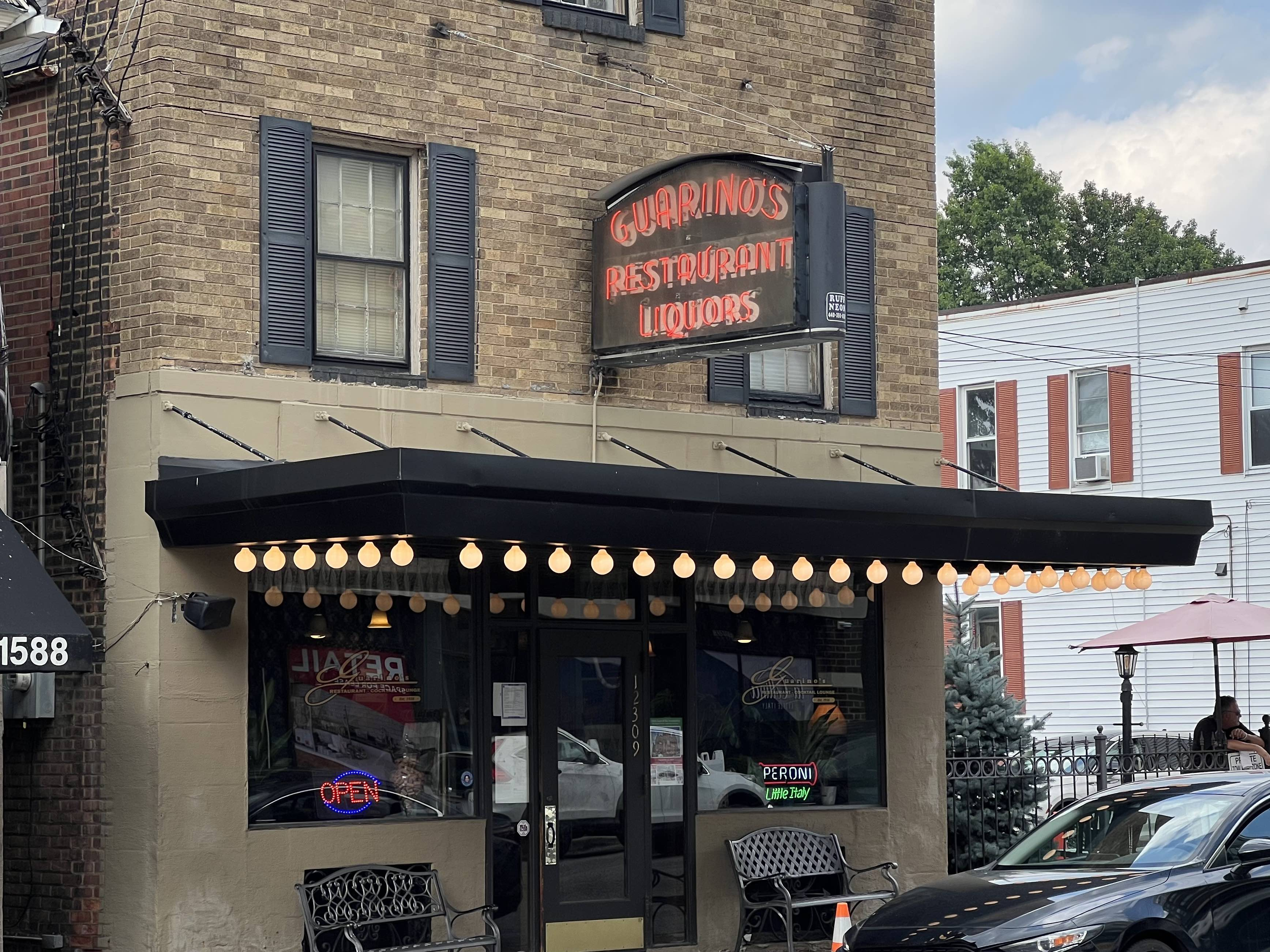
- Interactive map of Guarino's

Restaurant information
- Location: 12309 Mayfield Road, Cleveland, Ohio, 44106, United States
- Coordinates: 41°30′32″N 81°35′49″W
- Website: guarinoscleveland.com

Guarino's Restaurant is a restaurant in the Little Italy section of Cleveland, Ohio and is the oldest restaurant in Cleveland, founded in 1918 by Vincenzo Guarino.

People who have enjoyed the restaurant include Dean Martin and Frank Sinatra.

Founded as a speak-easy during Prohibition, Vincenzo and his wife raised their family on the second floor of the building located at 12309 Mayfield Road and operated the first floor as a restaurant and pool-room. Floor-to-ceiling beads were hung around the bar area to shield the illegal drinking practices from the windows and neighborhood authorities.

In 1954, Vincenzo Guarino passed away and the restaurant was run by his son Salvatore (Sam.) Sam's biggest contribution to the restaurant legacy was opening "The Garden" which is the outdoor patio in the rear of the restaurant. Trumpet vines and Grape vines grew from pergolas along the northern wall and the Trumpet vine still grows in every year.

In 1987, Sam Guarino died and left the restaurant to be run by his widow, Marilyn, and family friend Nancy Phillips. Nancy and Marilyn turned the restaurant into a private catering destination and grew the garden into a local landmark as one of Cleveland's best patios.

As Nancy and Marilyn grew into their respective twilight years, the business was sold unto the next generation, and is currently owned by Scott Phillips Jr (Nancy's grandson), Scott Phillips Sr (Nancy's son) and Rachel Phillips (Nancy's daughter.) The three owners still operate the business today and celebrated the milestone of crossing 100 years of business in one location in 2018.

Employees of the restaurant have been said to work there for as many as fifty years including Mary "Suzy" Pacifico.
