= Brier Hill–style pizza =

Style of pizza

Brier Hill-style pizza
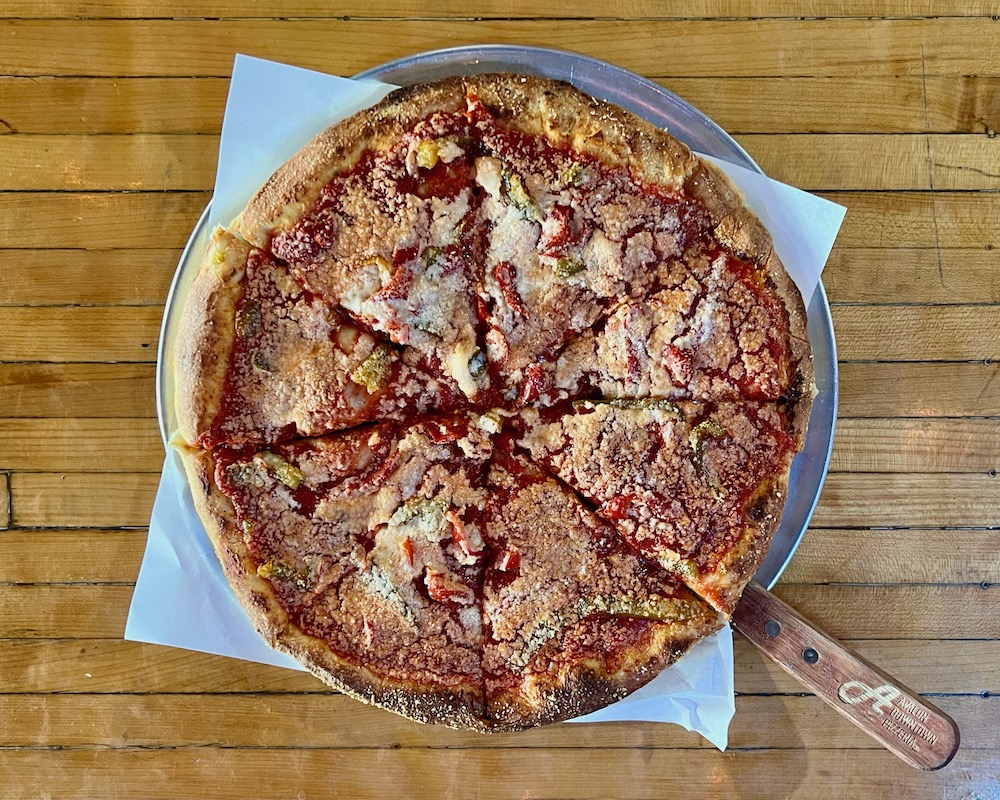
- Type: Pizza
- Place of origin: Youngstown, Ohio
- Created by: Italian Immigrants
- Main ingredients: tomato pizza sauce, red and green peppers, Romano cheese

Brier Hill–style pizza was developed by Italian immigrants in the Brier Hill neighborhood of Youngstown, Ohio. It is Youngstown's best-known style of pizza.

== History ==
The pizza was developed in the Brier Hill neighborhood of Youngstown, Ohio. The neighborhood takes its name from the nearby Brier Hill Farm estate of Ohio judge George Tod and former Ohio governor David Tod and the family's Brier Hill Iron & Coal Company. The area was where Youngstown's first Italian immigrants settled in the late 1800s to find work in the steel mills.

They developed the style during the Great Depression as a use for extra bread dough. It was originally baked in communal brick ovens.

== Description ==
Brier Hill pizza is characterized by a breadlike dough, thick tomato sauce, bell peppers and Romano cheese rather than the more-typical mozzarella. The traditional toppings were used because home-canned tomatoes and peppers were common items in many Italian homes and Romano cheese can be stored without refrigeration.

== Popularity ==
Brier Hill is Youngstown's best-known style of pizza. It is not well-known outside of the area, but examples exist in Cleveland, Pittsburgh, and Columbus.
