= Swensons =

American drive-in restaurant chain

Swensons Drive-In Restaurants
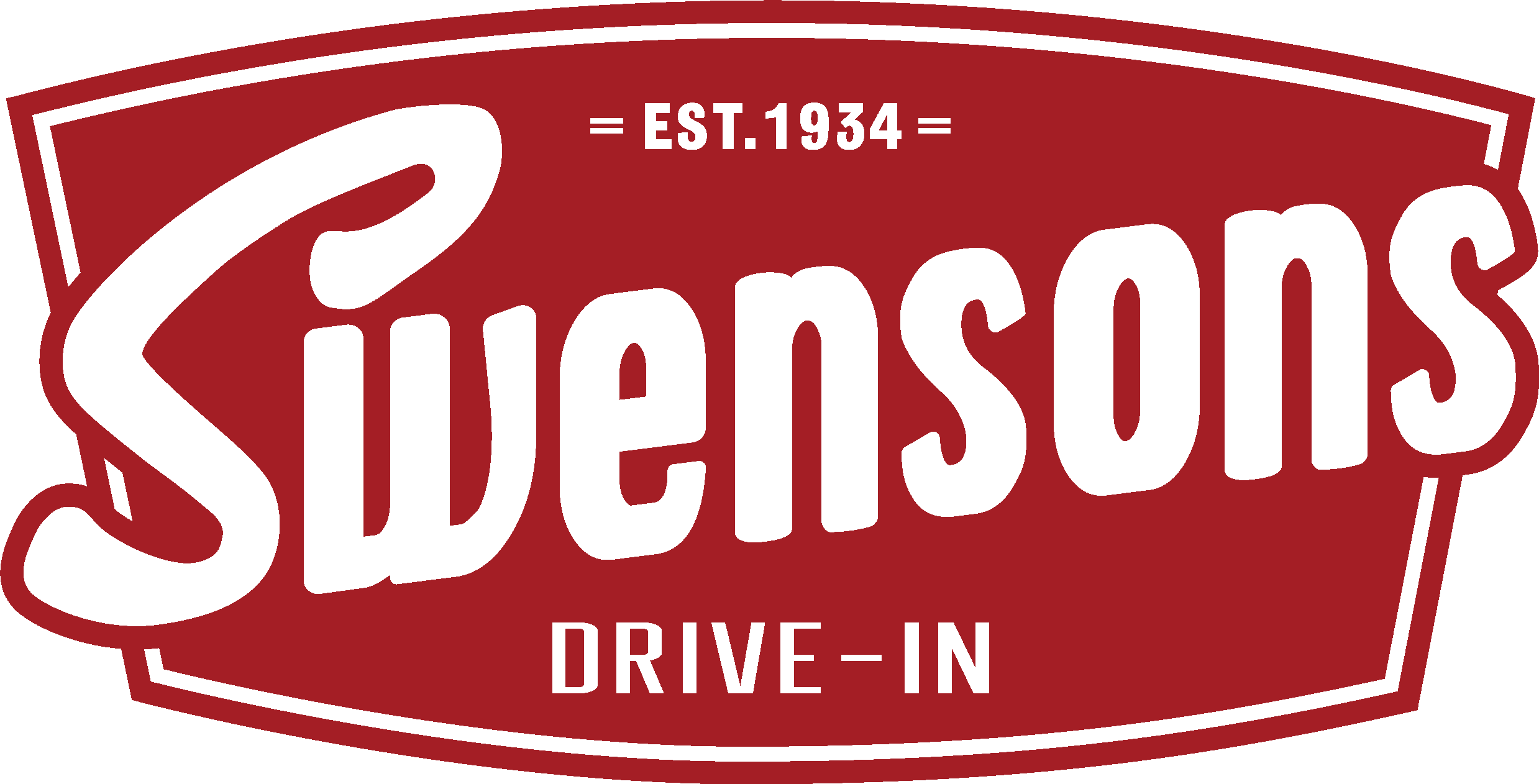
- Type: Private
- Industry: Fast food
- Founded: 1934; 92 years ago
- Founder: Wesley T. "Pop" Swenson
- Headquarters: Akron, Ohio, United States
- Number of locations: 20 (2023)
- Areas served: Greater Akron, Canton, Cleveland, Cincinnati, Columbus and Youngstown, Ohio, as well as Greater Indianapolis, Indiana
- Products: Burgers
- Number of employees: 800
- Website: swensonsdriveins.com

Swensons Drive-In is an Ohio and Indiana drive-in restaurant chain with locations in the Akron, Canton, Cleveland, Columbus, Cincinnati and Youngstown areas, along with the Indianapolis area. Swensons' signature hamburger is the Galley Boy, a double cheeseburger prepared using two sauces, and the restaurant also purveys 18 different milkshakes.

== History ==
Wesley T. "Pop" Swenson started selling hamburgers at Buchtel High School out of a station wagon in 1933. In 1934, he opened a restaurant on South Hawkins Avenue in Akron, near West Market Street. Swenson sold the restaurant in 1949 to Robert Phillips, who began expansion in 1952 with a second location in North Akron on East Cuyahoga Falls Avenue. Other locations include Stow (1987), Montrose (1995), Jackson Township (1996), Seven Hills (2001), North Canton (2003), University Heights (2017), North Olmsted (2018), Avon (2018), Willoughby (July 2021), and Boardman (2022). Expansion of the chain into the Columbus area is complete with locations in Dublin, New Albany, Columbus, and Hilliard. Swensons expanded to Indiana, opening in Avon in February 2023.

== Reception ==
- Forbes noted Swensons as "America's Best Burger" in 1999.

== In popular culture ==
On an episode of The Food Network's series Food Feuds entitled Beef Feuds, Swensons was pitted against the Skyway drive-in in the Akron suburb of Fairlawn for best double cheeseburger in the Akron area. Celebrity fans include Black Keys drummer Patrick Carney, actor Matt Lanter, and basketball player LeBron James.
