= Taste of Cincinnati =

Longest running culinary arts festival in the United States

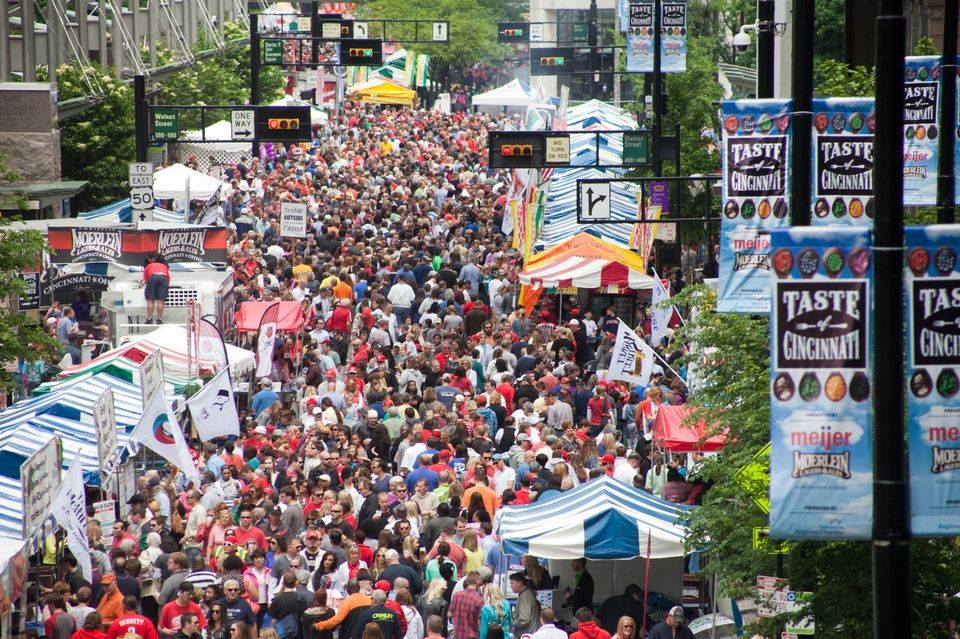
Crowds enjoy regional cuisine on Fifth Street at Taste of Cincinnati 2014.

Taste of Cincinnati is the longest running culinary arts festival in the United States. Starting in 1979, the festival has been held annually on Memorial Day weekend in Downtown Cincinnati, Ohio. More than 40 fine restaurants are featured at the festival, and "Best of Taste" awards are given out each year. In addition to food, the festival highlights local musical talent. The four stages for performances feature country, rock, pop, and jazz music. Approximately 500,000 people attend Taste of Cincinnati each year, making it one of the nation's largest street festivals.

== History ==
The idea of Taste of Cincinnati derived from Taste of the Big Apple News, which Karen Maier, then Frisch's vice president of marketing, came across in the Nation's Restaurant News, a publication that covers the American foodservice industry.

Taste of Cincinnati started in 1979 as a daylong festival in Piatt Park, previously known as Garfield Park. About 5,000 people were in attendance. In 1981, another day was added to the festivities, and in 1988, one more day was added, totaling three days (the number of days currently reserved for the event). At this time, the festivities were also moved from Piatt Park to Central Parkway in Downtown Cincinnati.

Upon the completion of the $42-million renovation of the Tyler Davidson Fountain Square in 2007, the Taste was again relocated, this time to Fifth Street, taking up six blocks, from Race to Broadway, near Downtown Cincinnati's cluster of hotels, including The Cincinnatian, the Garfield Suites Hotel, the Hyatt Regency Cincinnati, the Millennium Hotel Cincinnati, The Terrace Hotel, and the Westin Hotel Cincinnati.

In 1997, Taste of Cincinnati was selected from over 40,000 special events across the United States as the Food Event of the Year by Events Business News.

In recent years, the Taste has been held over five blocks along Fifth Street, spanning from Vine Street to Sycamore Street.

There was no festival in 2020, but a virtual one was held in its place.

== Best of Taste ==
Each year, restaurateurs are able to enter their restaurants' dishes into the Best of Taste competition as part of the Taste of Cincinnati. There are several categories for which the food entry can be classified: Appetizers, Soups and Salads, Seafood, Entrees, Vegetarian Entree, Desserts, and the coined "Best Damned Dish". The Best Damn Dish is the overall winner of the Best of Taste competition. Aside from the Best Damned Dish, with only grand prize winner, each of the other categories award three dishes: Best of Taste, Award of Excellence, and Award of Merit. Restaurants who win these awards often proudly display their certificate within their facility.

== Recent Taste Winners ==
2015:

Best Appetizer

- 1st Place: The 'wich on Sycamore - Coconut & Rice Soup
- 2nd Place: Thai Taste - Crab Rangoon
- 3rd Place: Alfio's Buon Cibo - Roasted Red Pepper and Prosciutto Empanada

Best Entrée

- 1st Place: The Melting Pot - Teriyaki Sirlon
- 2nd Place: Via Vite - Penne alla Bolognese
- 3rd Place: Alfio's Buon Cibo - Steak Ravioli with Roasted Red Pepper & Arugula Cream Sauce

Best Dessert

- 1st Place: Market Street Grille - Creme Brulee
- 2nd Place: Remezo Greek Cuisine - Baklava
- 3rd Place: Alfio's Buon Cibo - Goat Cheese & Brown Sugar Cheese Cake

Best Vegetarian

- 1st Place: Bangkok Bistro - Vegetable Sukiyaki
- 2nd Place: Silver Ladle - Silver Ladle Salad
- 3rd Place: Market Street Grille - Black & Bleu Tuna

Best Go Vibrant Healthy Dining option

- 1st Place: Market Street Grille - Spicy Chicken Wrap
- 2nd Place: Silver Ladle - Cuban Black Bean Soup
- 3rd Place: Thai Taste - Wonton Soup

2012:
Appetizers:

- Best of Taste: Strasse Haus, Fried Peanut Butter & Jelly
- Award of Excellence: LaRosa's, Spinach Rondo
- Award of Merit: Market Street Grille, Stuffed Chicken Amore

Soups/Salads:

- Best of Taste: du jours/Courtyard Cafe, Hunter's Home Turkey Chili
- Award of Excellence: ZZ's Pizza Company, Caprese Salad
- Award of Merit: City Barbeque, Gumbo

Seafood:

- Best of Taste: Arloi Dee Thai Bistro, Crab & Shrimp Dumpling with Noodle
- Award of Excellence: ZZ's Pizza Company, Seafood Pizza

Entrees:

- Best of Taste: Andy's Mediterranean Grille, Gyro Wrap
- Award of Excellence: Claddagh Irish Pub, Jameson Burger
- Award of Merit: Lazlo's Iron Skillet, Walking Chicken Saltimbocca

Vegetarian Entree:

- Best of Taste: du jours/Courtyard Cafe, Black Bean Burrito
- Award of Excellence: J Gumbo’s, Bumblebee Stew
- Award of Merit: LaRosa's, Skinny Wheat Pizza

Desserts:

- Best of Taste: ZZ's Pizza Company, Banana Cream pie
- Award of Excellence: du jours/Courtyard Cafe, Raspberry Cloud Pie
- Award of Merit: Claddaugh Irish Pub, Bread Pudding

Best Damn Dish 2012:

- Arloi Dee Thai Bistro, Crab & Shrimp Dumpling with Noodle

2011:
Appetizers:

- Best of Taste: Bella Luna, Prime Rib Cannelloni
- Award of Excellence: Mac’s Pizza Pub, Mini Reuben Mac-over
- Award of Merit: Habanero Latin America, Chicken Taco

Soups/Salads:

- Best of Taste: City BBQ, Gumbo
- Award of Excellence: Arloi Dee Thai Bistro, Chicken Lettuce Wraps
- Award of Merit: Courtyard Café, Baked Potato Soup

Seafood:

- Best of Taste: Bella Luca, Lobster Ravioli
- Award of Excellence: Washington Platform, Southern Fried Oysters
- Award of Merit: Habanero Latin America, Baja Fish Taco Platter

Entrees:

- Best of Taste: Claddagh Irish Pub, Jameson Burger
- Award of Excellence: Bella Luna, Pulled Pork Shank
- Award of Merit: Krimmer’s Italianette Pizzeria, Lasagna

Vegetarian Entree:

- Best of Taste: Taz Restaurant, Falafel Sandwich
- Award of Excellence: J Gumbo's, Bumblebee Stew
- Award of Merit: Courtyard Café, Black Bean Burrito

Desserts:

- Best of Taste: Bella Luna, Bread Pudding
- Award of Excellence: Claddagh Irish Pub, Bread Pudding
- Award of Merit: Pizza Tower, Funnel Cake Fries

Best Damn Dish:

- Bella Luna, Prime Rib Cannelloni
