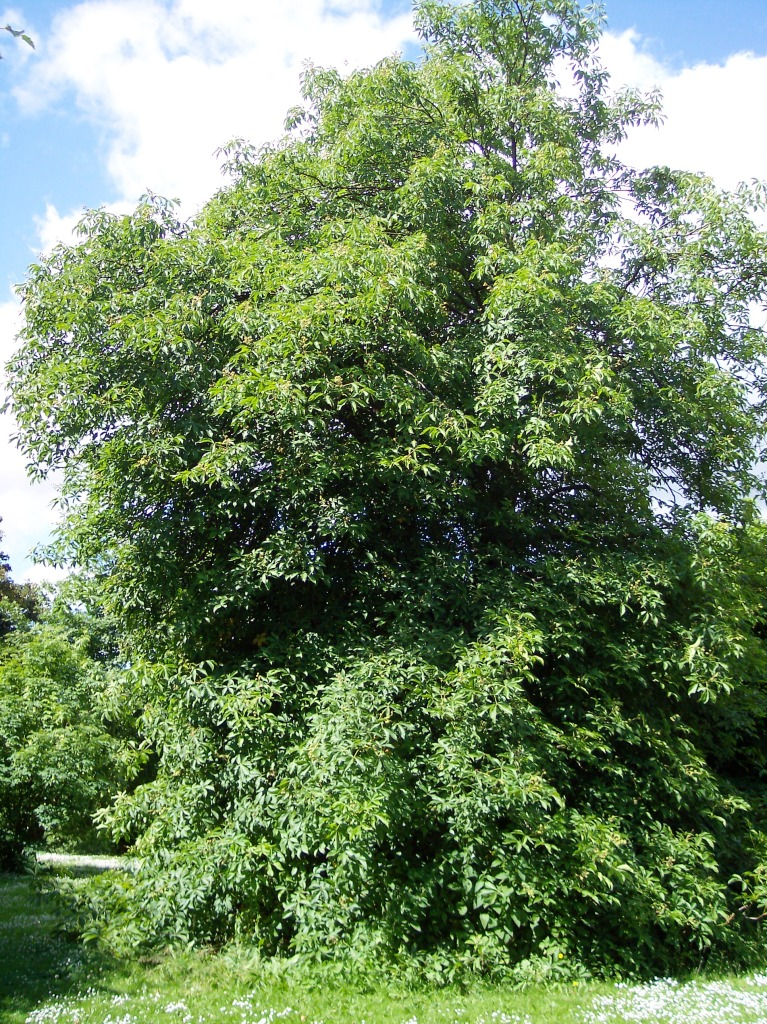

Conservation status
- Least Concern (IUCN 3.1)

Scientific classification
- Kingdom: Plantae
- Clade: Embryophytes
- Clade: Tracheophytes
- Clade: Angiosperms
- Clade: Eudicots
- Clade: Rosids
- Order: Sapindales
- Family: Sapindaceae
- Genus: Aesculus
- Species: A. glabra

Binomial name
- Aesculus glabra Willd.
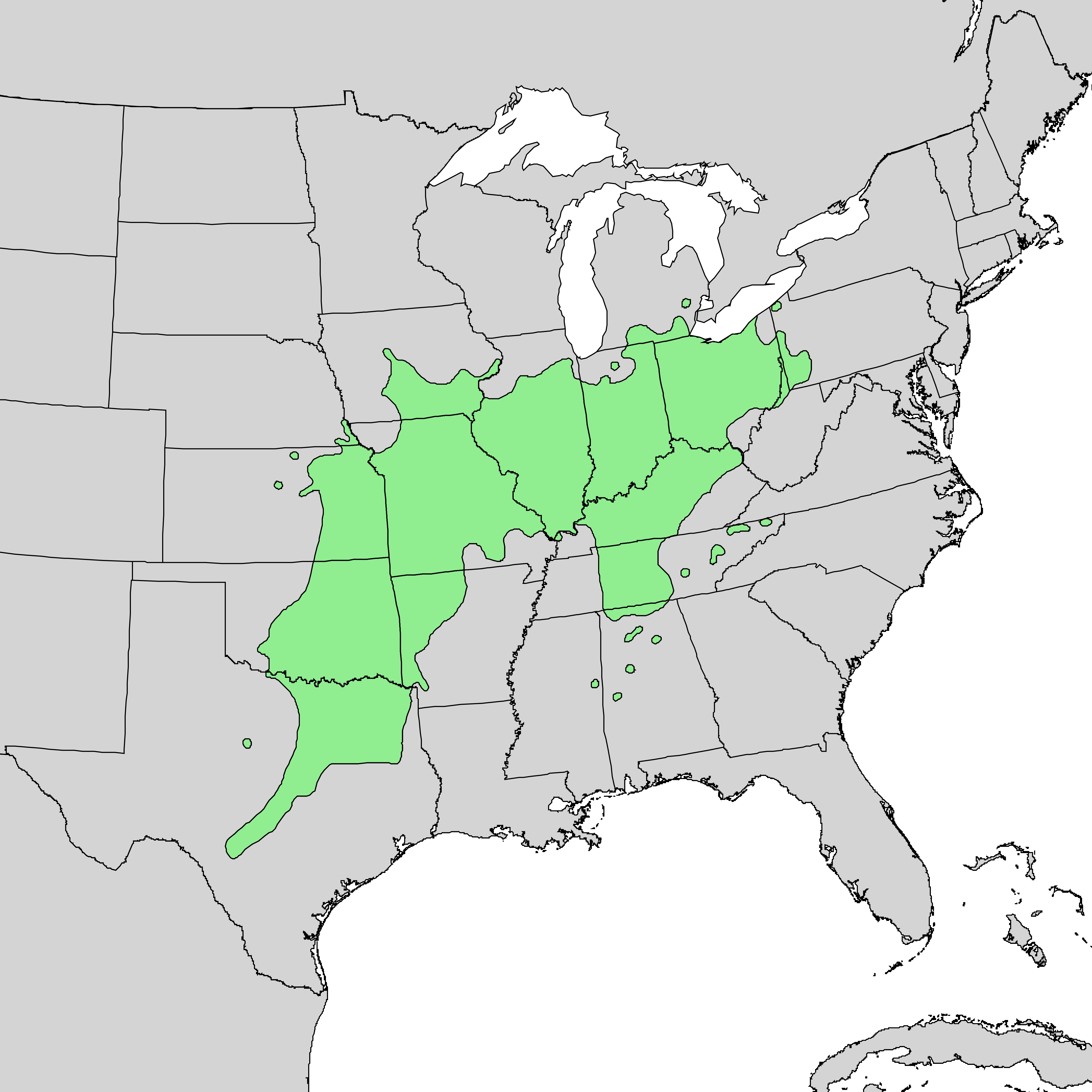
- Generalized natural range

= Aesculus glabra =

Ohio buckeye

Species of tree

Aesculus glabra, commonly known as Ohio buckeye, Texas buckeye, or fetid buckeye, is a species of tree in the soapberry family (Sapindaceae) native to North America.

Its natural range is primarily in the Midwestern and lower Great Plains regions of the United States, extending southeast into the geological Black Belt of Alabama and Mississippi. It is also found locally in the extreme southwest of Ontario, on Walpole Island in Lake St. Clair.

It is found in a variety of natural habitats, including streambanks, upland mesic forests, and along the margins of old fields. It is typically found in calcareous areas.

== Description ==
The leaves are palmately compound with five leaflets 8–16 cm (3–6 1/2 in) long and broad. The flowers are produced in panicles in spring, red, yellow to yellow-green, each flower 2–3 cm (3/4–1 1/4 in) long with the stamens longer than the petals (unlike the related yellow buckeye, where the stamens are shorter than the petals). The fruit is a round capsule 4–5 cm (1 1/2–2 in) diameter, containing one nut-like seed, 2–3 cm (3/4–1 1/4 in) in diameter, brown with a whitish basal scar.

The inedible seeds contain tannic acid and are poisonous to cattle and humans. The young foliage, shoots, and bark are also poisonous to some degree. However, Native Americans reportedly did eat buckeye fruit after boiling it to extract tannin.

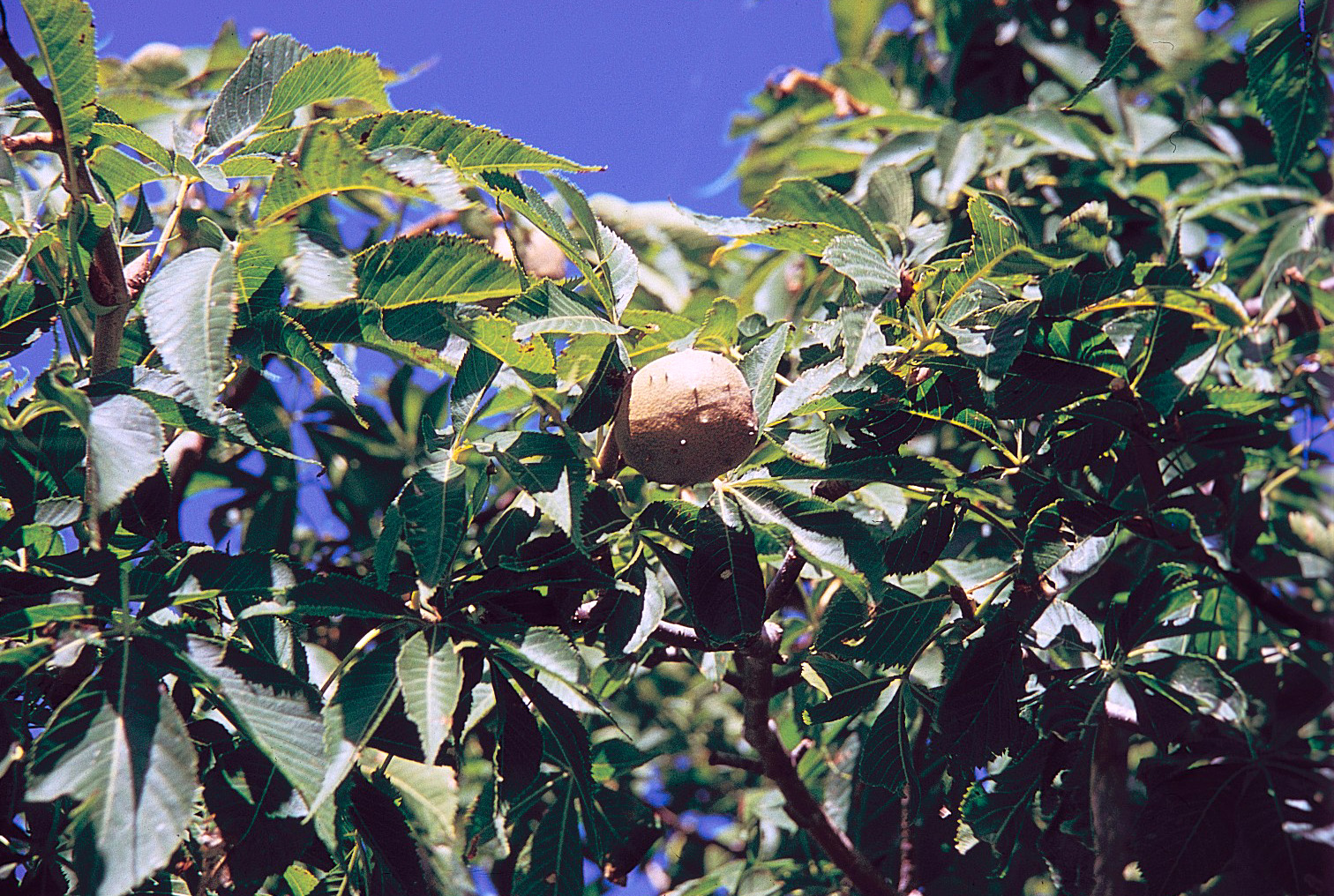
Foliage and fruit

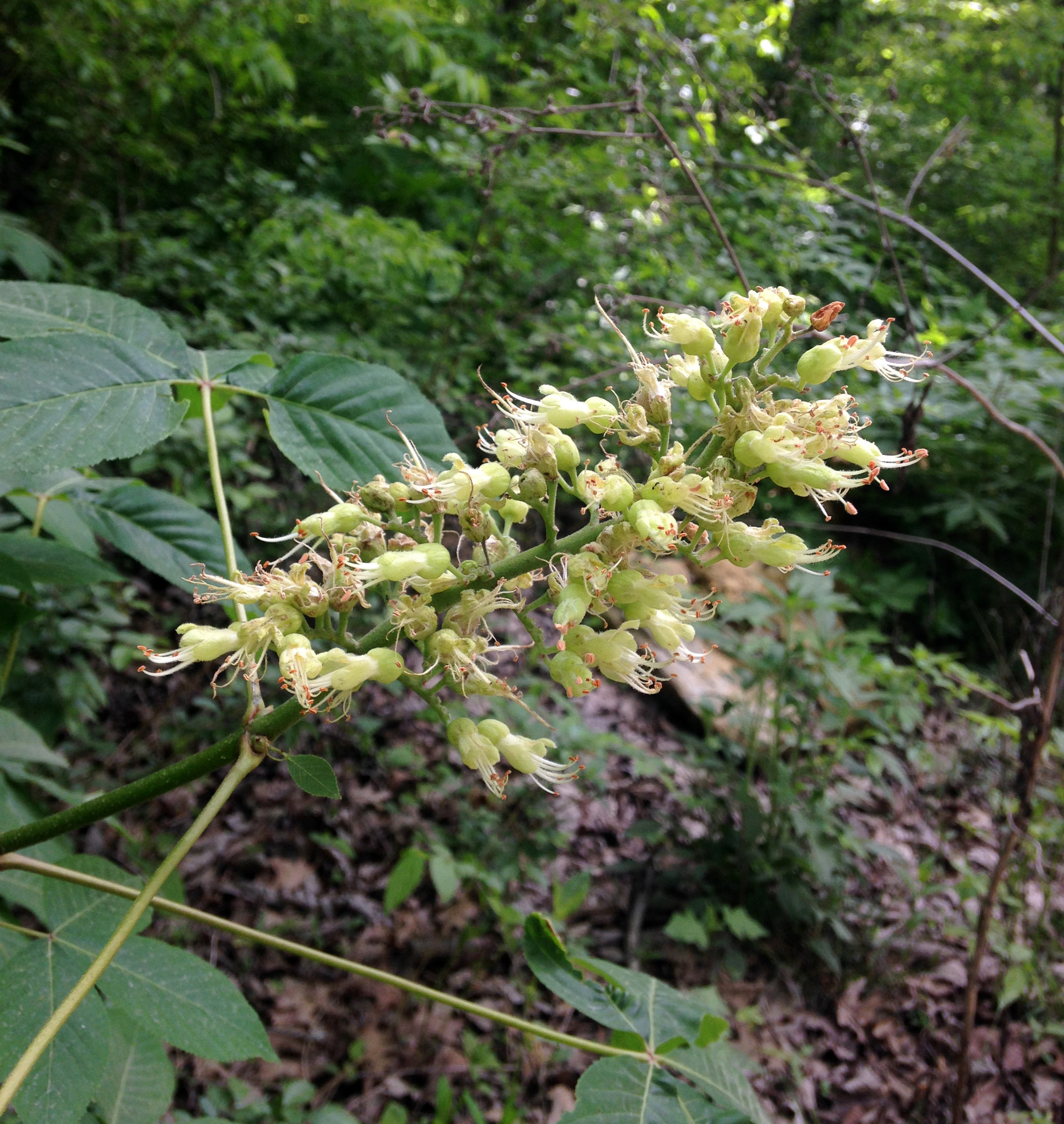
Inflorescence

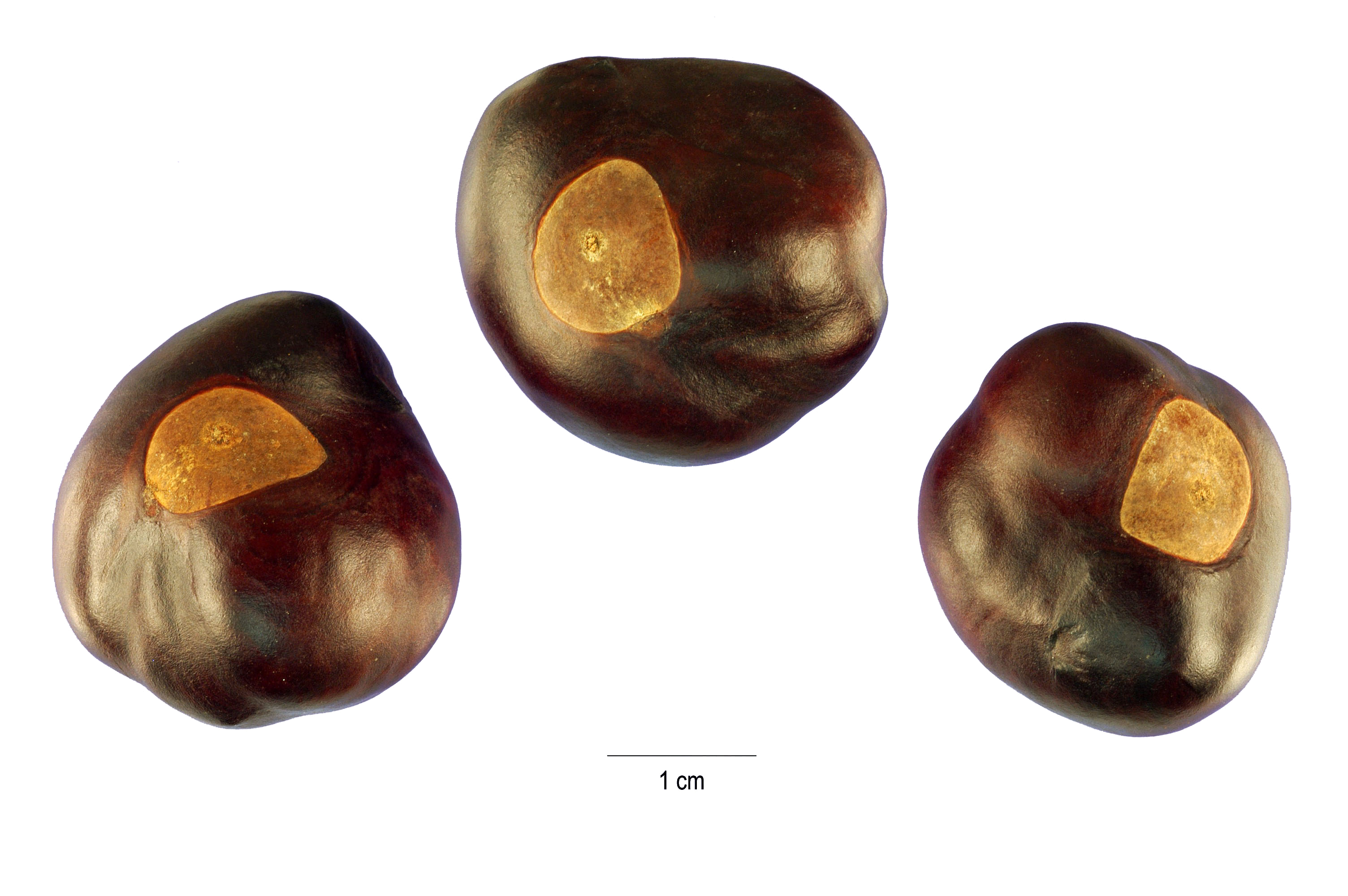
Dried buckeye nuts

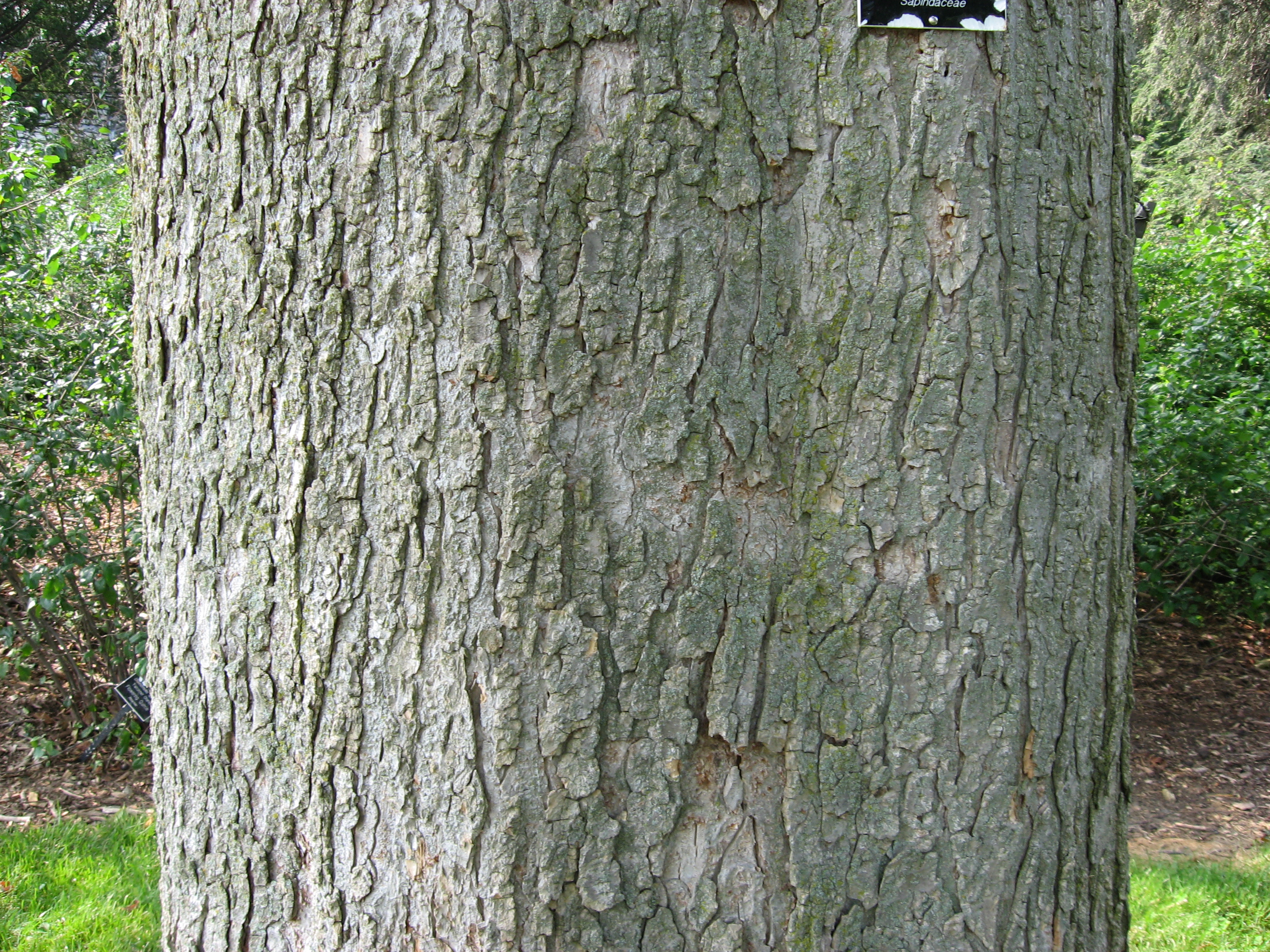
Closeup of trunk

== Etymology ==
The name stems from Native Americans, who called the nut "hetuck", which means "buck eye". The markings of the nut resembled the eyes of a deer.

== Uses ==
Aesculus glabra has little use as a timber tree due to its soft, light wood. Although occasionally seen in cultivation, the large, copiously produced fruits make it generally undesirable as a street tree. Extracts from A. glabra have shown anti-cancer properties.

=== Native American ethnobotany ===
The Lenape carried the nuts in their pockets for rheumatism, and an infusion of ground nuts was mixed with sweet oil or mutton tallow for earaches. They also ground the nuts and used them to poison fish in streams.

Native Americans blanched buckeye nuts, extracting the tannic acid for use in making leather. The nuts can also be dried, turning dark as they harden with exposure to the air, and strung into necklaces similar to those made from the kukui nut in Hawaii.

== Culture ==
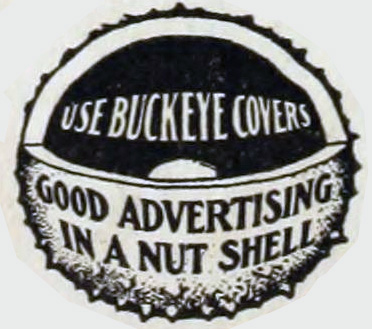
A buckeye nut used in an early 20th-century ad, evoking the Seal of Ohio

The Ohio buckeye is the state tree of Ohio, and its name is an original term of endearment for the pioneers on the Ohio frontier. Subsequently, "buckeye" came to be used as the nickname and colloquial name for people from Ohio. Ohio State University adopted "Buckeyes" officially as its nickname in 1950, and also uses the name for its sports teams. It came to be applied to any student or graduate of the university.

Buckeye candy, made to resemble the tree's nut, is made by dipping a ball of peanut butter fudge in milk chocolate, leaving a circle of the peanut butter exposed. These are a popular treat in Ohio, especially during the Christmas and college football seasons.

Buckeyes (the nuts) are a recurring motif in Bill Watterson's comic, Calvin and Hobbes, often as one of Calvin's tools of torment. Watterson himself grew up in Chagrin Falls, Ohio, an eastern suburb of Cleveland.
