= Klondike bar =

Brand of square-shaped chocolate covered ice cream novelties

Klondike Bar
- Klondike's logo until 2019

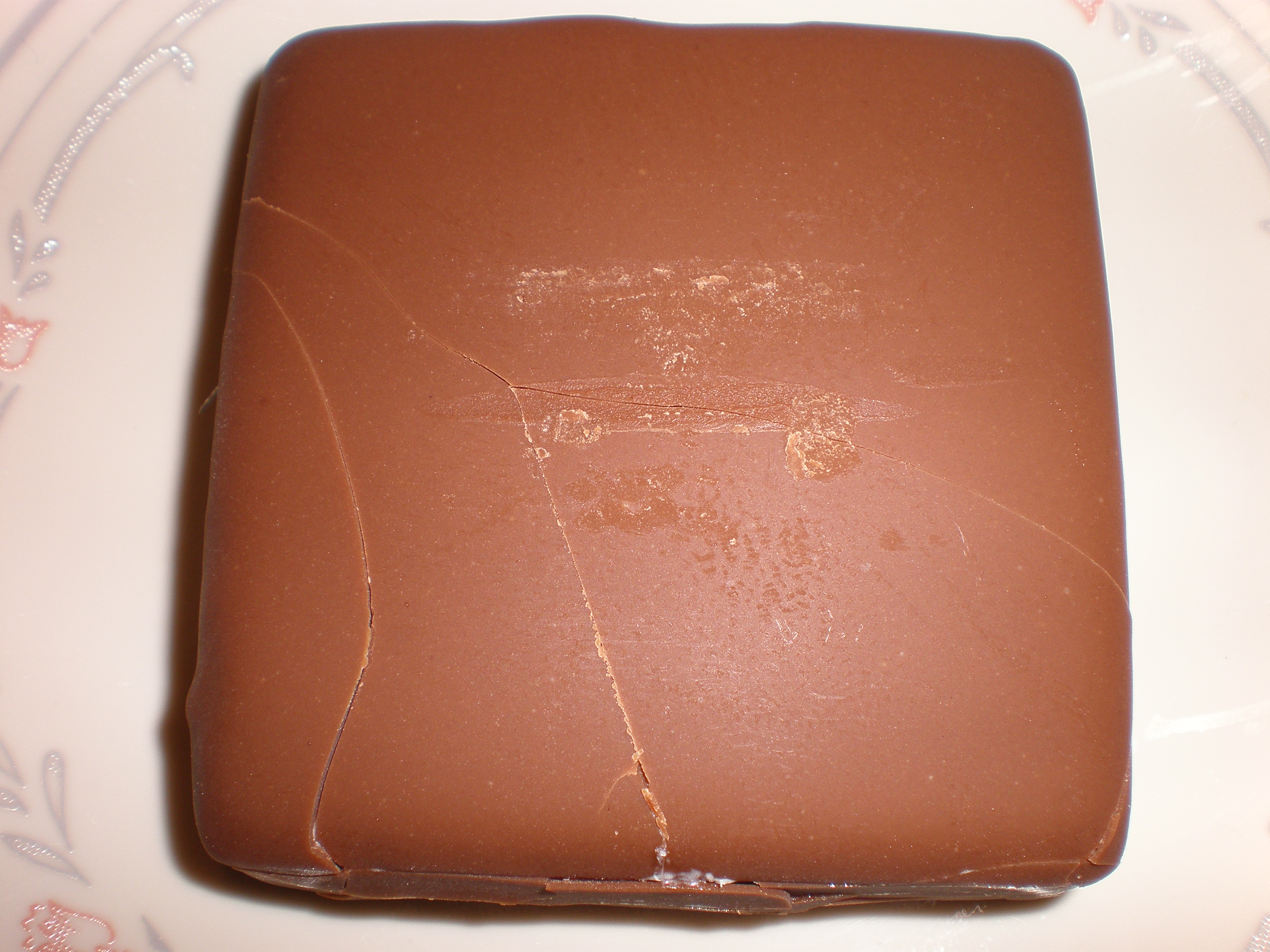
- Original Klondike bar with vanilla ice cream
- Product type: Ice cream bar
- Current owner: Good Humor-Breyers
- Country: Mansfield, Ohio, U.S.
- Introduced: 1922; 104 years ago
- Markets: U.S. and Canada
- Previous owners: Isaly Dairy Company (1922)
- Tagline: "What Would You Do For A Klondike Bar?"
- Website: klondikebar.com

A Klondike bar is a Good Humor-Breyers ice cream novelty. The product is made with frozen dairy dessert and a chocolatey coating.

== History ==
The Klondike bar was created by the Isaly Dairy Company of Mansfield, Ohio, in the early 1920s and named after the Klondike River of Yukon, Canada. Rights to the name were eventually sold to Good Humor-Breyers, a division of Unilever.

The first recorded advertisement for the Klondike was on February 5, 1922, in the Youngstown Vindicator. The bars are wrapped with a silver-colored foil wrapper depicting a polar bear mascot for the brand. Unlike a traditional frozen ice pop, or traditional ice cream bar, the Klondike bar does not have a stick due to its size, a point often touted in advertising.

In 1976, Henry Clarke, owner of the Clabir company, purchased the rights to the Klondike bar, which had been manufactured and sold by the Isaly's restaurant chain since the 1930s. Clarke introduced Klondike bars to consumers throughout the United States during the 1980s. Under Clarke, sales of the Klondike bar increased from $800,000 annually at the time of the 1976 acquisition by Clabir to more than $60 million.

In 1986, the U.S. 11th Circuit Court of Appeals prohibited Kraft Foods from using a wrapper resembling the distinctive Klondike bar wrapper (its "trade dress") for Kraft's "Polar B'ar" brand ice cream bars. The following year, the U.S. Supreme Court declined to hear an appeal of the lower court ruling. In 1988, Kraft settled a trademark dispute with Ambrit Inc., as the former Isaly Company, Inc. was then known, for $8.5 million.

== See also ==
- Choc ice, the British English name for this type of product
- List of ice cream brands
