= Buffalo Silents =

1920s exhibition basketball team

The Buffalo Silents of were a 1920s exhibition basketball team from Buffalo, New York, whose members were deaf or mute. The team barnstormed across Pennsylvania, New York and Ohio, playing teams such as Jim Thorpe and His World-Famous Indians basketball team.
