= Food Feuds =

- Genre: Food Reality
- Presented by: Michael Symon
- Country of origin: United States
- Original language: English
- No. of seasons: 1
- No. of episodes: 10

Production
- Executive producer: Alkemy X, Inc.
- Camera setup: Multi-camera
- Running time: 25 minutes
- Production company: Alkemy X

Original release
- Network: Food Network
- Release: October 10, 2010 – present

Food Feuds is a weekly series hosted by Iron Chef Michael Symon that premiered on Food Network October 10, 2010. The show features food rivalries or "feuds" between local restaurants in cities around the United States.

== Synopsis ==
In each episode Michael Symon travels from city to city to settle some of the most famous food rivalries/feuds in the country. Symon visits both establishments, see how the specialties are prepared, tries both dishes up for the challenge, then talks with local food critics and fans to help him decide who should win. At the end, a final critique of the specialty is conducted by Symon himself, the only judge. He bases the food on three criteria: appearance, taste, and overall product while both challengers stand by to find out if they will receive the Food Feud trophy and be crowned the champion.

== Episodes ==
Food Feuds premiered on October 10, 2010, with two back-to-back episodes that premiered at 10:00 and 10:30 pm EST. New episodes currently air on Thursday nights at 10:00 pm EST.

Note: The pilot episode debuted on Food Network and aired on Friday, June 4, 2010 at 10:30 pm ET/PT.

=== Season 1 (2010) ===
Ep. #	Airdate	Title	Rivalry/Feud	Specialty	Location	Winner
1.1	June 4, 2010	Feuds on a Roll	Al's #1 Italian Beef vs. Mr. Beef	Italian Beef	Chicago, Illinois	Al's #1 Italian Beef
--	--	--	American Coney Island vs Lafayette Coney Island	Coney Island Hot Dog	Detroit, Michigan	American Coney Island
In this pilot episode, Michael Symon travels to Chicago, Illinois to taste test Al's #1 Beef against cross-town rival Mr. Beef to decide which serves the city's best Italian Beef sandwich. Then Symon is off to Detroit, Michigan to a settle a 93-year-old family feud of who serves the best "coney dog".
1.2	October 10, 2010	Cheesy Feud	Pat's vs Geno's Steaks	Philly Cheesesteak	Philadelphia, Pennsylvania	Pat's
--	--	--	Elieen's vs Junior's	New York-style Cheesecake	New York City, New York	Junior's
Geno's owner Joey Vento died of a heart attack at age 71 on August 23, 2011.
1.3	October 14, 2010	Italian Feuds	Villa Di Roma vs. Ralph's	Meatballs	Philadelphia, Pennsylvania	Villa Di Roma
--	--	--	Regina Pizzeria vs Santarpio's	Neapolitan-style Pizza	Boston, Massachusetts	Regina Pizzeria
1.4	October 21, 2010	Seafood Feud	Woodman's vs. JT Farnham's	Fried Clams	Essex, Massachusetts	JT Farnham's
--	--	--	Luke's Lobster vs Ed's Lobster Bar	Lobster Roll	New York City, New York	Ed's Lobster Bar
1.5	October 28, 2010	Cake Feuds	Faidley's vs. Gretrude's	Crab Cakes	Baltimore, Maryland	Faidley's
--	--	--	Ladybird vs Cupcake Stop	Red Velvet Cupcake	New York City, New York	Cupcake Stop
1.6	November 4, 2010	American Food Feuds	White Manna vs. White Mana	Sliders	Hackensack, New Jersey & Jersey City, New Jersey	White Manna
--	--	--	White House vs Belgrade Gardens	Barberton Chicken	Barberton, Ohio	Belgrade Gardens
1.7	November 18, 2010	Pork Feuds	John's Roast Pork vs. Tony Luke's	Italian Roast Pork Sandwich	Philadelphia, Pennsylvania	Tony Luke's
--	--	--	Pappy's Smokehouse vs. 17th St. Bar & Grill	Barbeque Pork Ribs	St. Louis, Missouri	17th St. Bar & Grill
1.8	December 2, 2010	Beef Feuds	Swensons vs Skyway	Juicy Double Cheeseburger	Akron, Ohio	Swensons
--	--	--	Tracey's vs. Parkway Bakery & Tavern	Po'Boy Sandwich	New Orleans, Louisiana	Tracey's
1.9	December 30, 2010	Sweet Feuds	Graeter's vs. Aglamesis Bro's	Chocolate Chip Ice Cream	Cincinnati, Ohio	Graeter's
--	--	--	Park Ave Coffee vs Gooey Louie	Gooey Butter Cake	St. Louis, Missouri	Park Ave Coffee

== See also ==
- Food Wars on Travel Channel
