= Anthony Thomas Candy Company =

American confectionery manufacturer

Anthony-Thomas Candy Company is an American confectionery manufacturer headquartered in Columbus, Ohio. It is one of the largest family-owned and operated candy companies in the Midwestern United States. The company produces a variety of chocolate products, including chocolate Buckeyes, assorted chocolate bars, and both dark and milk chocolates. It was founded in 1952 by Anthony and Thomas Zanetos.

Anthony-Thomas products are distributed across the contiguous United States. The company operates a manufacturing facility in Columbus, Ohio, and maintains 13 retail locations throughout Franklin and Delaware counties. It is officially licensed by The Ohio State University to sell branded chocolate Buckeyes.

== History ==
=== 20th century ===
Anthony Zanetos emigrated from Greece to the United States in 1907. He began working as an apprentice candy maker in Columbus, Ohio. In 1932, he opened the Co-Op Dairy in the city. Following his military service in World War II, Anthony's son Thomas returned home in 1945. The father and son later opened a confectionery business at the former dairy location.

In 1947, the pair launched the Crystal Fountain Restaurant, which included ice cream equipment, a soda fountain, and a lunch counter. As demand for candy products grew, the family shifted their focus to candy-making and formally established the Anthony-Thomas Candy Company in 1952.

In 1969, the company moved operations to a 60,000-square-foot facility at 1160 West Broad Street. A larger, 152,000-square-foot factory was constructed in 1995 at 1777 Arlingate Lane in Columbus.

=== 21st century ===
The factory was expanded by 2,000 square feet in 2016 to increase production efficiency and improve the visitor tour experience. In 2024, the facility underwent another expansion, adding 20,000 square feet for a total of 174,000 square feet.

== Operations ==
Anthony-Thomas operates one manufacturing facility and 13 retail stores in the Columbus area. The company also runs fundraising and contract-manufacturing divisions. It employs more than 200 individuals and produces approximately 60,000 pounds of chocolate per day. Public factory tours are offered, providing insight into production processes and company history.

As of the most recent update, the company is led by President Joe Zanetos (third generation), Vice President Candi Trifelos (fourth generation), and Nick Trifelos (fifth generation).

== Products ==
The company's signature product is the chocolate peanut butter Buckeye, which is officially licensed by The Ohio State University. Annual Buckeye sales exceed 14 million units. Anthony-Thomas also produces fundraising candy bars for schools, churches, and other organizations. Its broader product line includes boxed milk and dark chocolates featuring English toffee, pecan dainties, caramel, butter creams, sea salt varieties, and cherry cordials. The company specializes in shell-molded candies.

== Locations ==
The primary manufacturing plant and retail outlet are located at 1777 Arlingate Lane in Columbus, Ohio. Twelve additional retail stores operate throughout the greater Columbus region.

== Community involvement ==
Anthony-Thomas maintains a partnership with the Ronald McDonald House Charities of Central Ohio.
