= Chipped chopped ham =

Processed luncheon meat

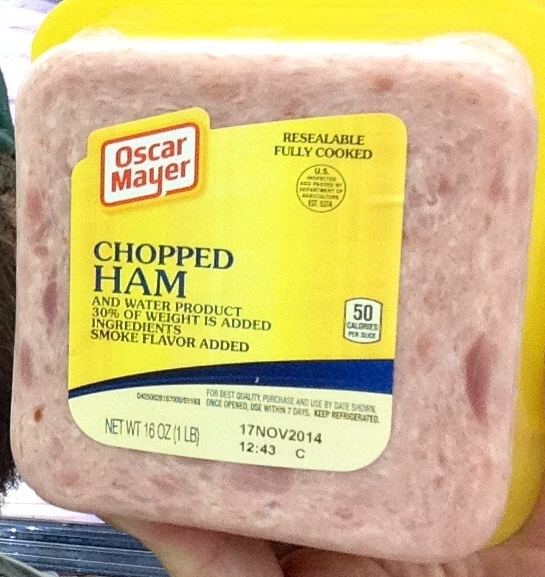
A packet of Oscar Mayer brand chopped ham

Chipped chopped ham or chipped ham is a processed ham luncheon meat made from chopped ham. Chopped ham is a mixture of ham chunks and trimmings and seasonings, ground together and then packaged into loaves. By chipping or shaving the meat loaf against a commercial meat slicer blade, the resultant thinly sliced product has a different texture and flavor compared to thickly sliced ham. In western Pennsylvania, northern West Virginia and eastern Ohio, the slicing process is also referred to as "Pittsburgh style".

Sometimes the chopped ham, once chipped, is mixed and heated with barbecue sauce before it is made into a sandwich. In the Pittsburgh region, sandwiches of "ham barbecue" or "barbecued chipped ham" are commonly served at home and available at lunch counters. The chain Isaly's helped to popularize chipped chopped ham.

Chipped chopped ham reached a broad audience in the post-World War II era when it was heavily marketed as a luncheon meat suitable for packed lunches. Former United States Army soldiers likened it to Spam, to which they had grown accustomed while in the army. Its popularity has been furthered by its relatively low cost per pound.

The product is produced by a few meat packing facilities that process pork products and is marketed under a variety of commercial brand names.

== See also ==
- List of hams
