= Flag of the United States Marine Corps =

United States Marine Corps
- Type III, Class 2, Organizational Standard USMC
- Use: Other
- Proportion: 31:26
- Adopted: 18 January 1939
- Design: A centered Eagle, Globe, and Anchor on a scarlet background, with a streaming banner underneath bearing the words "UNITED STATES MARINE CORPS" in scarlet lettering.
- Designed by: United States Marine Corps

The flag of the United States Marine Corps (Note: Also known as the standard or battle color, officially the "Type III. Class 2, Organizational Standard USMC".) is the flag used to represent the U.S. Marine Corps, as well as its subsidiary units and formations.

== Design ==
=== Official battle color of the U.S. Marine Corps ===
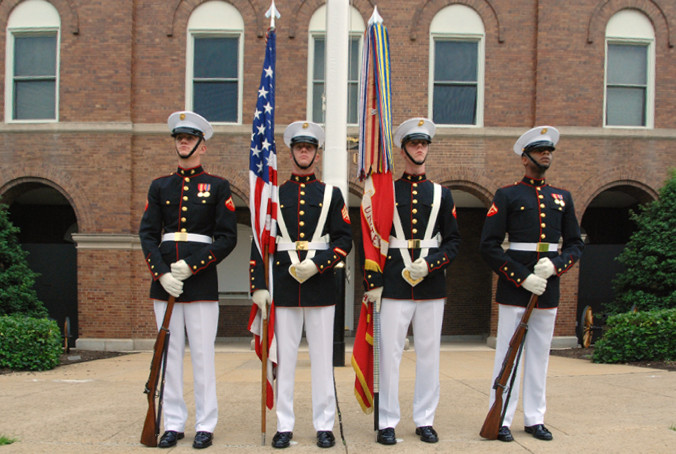
The Color Guard of the U.S. Marine Corps at the Marine Barracks, Washington, D.C. in June 2007.

The official flag is scarlet with the Corps emblem in gray and gold. It was adopted on 18 January 1939, although Marine Corps Order 4 had established scarlet and gold as the official colors of the Corps as early as 1925. The indoor/parade version is bordered by a gold fringe while the outdoor version is plain. It measures 52 inches (130 cm) on the hoist and 62 inches (160 cm) on the fly. In addition to the multi-colored battle streamers (measuring 3 feet (0.91 m) by 2 3/4 inches (7.0 cm) wide) affixed to the top of the staff, the staff itself is covered with sterling silver bands engraved with the names of conflicts in which the Corps has been engaged. This practice has been done since 3 November 1939, emulating the U.S. Army's practice of doing the same.

== History ==
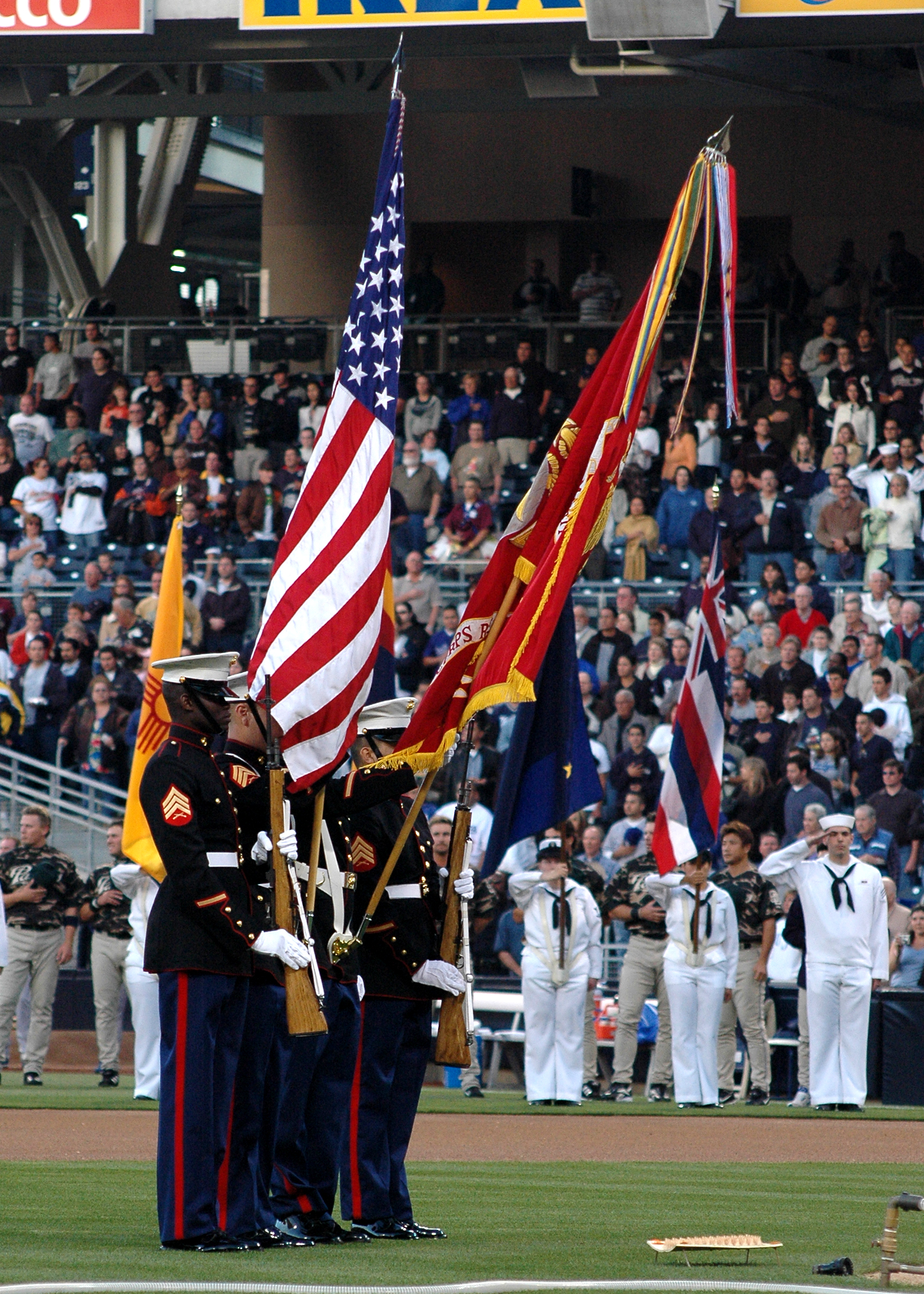
A U.S. Marine color guard dips the U.S. Marine Corps flag for a playing of "The Star-Spangled Banner" in April 2005.

Very little information is available regarding the flags carried by early American marines, although indications are that the Continental Union Flag was carried ashore by the battalion led by Captain Samuel Nicholas on New Providence Island on 3 March 1776. It is quite possible that the Gadsden flag was also carried on this expedition.

The standard carried by the Marines during the 1830s and the 1840s consisted of a white field with gold fringe, and bore an elaborate design of an anchor and eagle in the center. Prior to the Mexican–American War, this flag bore the legend "To the Shores of Tripoli" across the top. Shortly after the war, the legend was revised to read: "From Tripoli to the Halls of the Montezumas."

During the Mexican and Civil Wars, Marines in the field apparently carried a flag similar to the national flag, consisting of red and white stripes and a union. The union, however, contained an eagle perched on a shield of the United States and a half-wreath beneath the shield, with 29 stars encircling the entire design. Beginning in 1876, Marines carried the national colors (the Stars and Stripes) with "U.S. Marine Corps" embroidered in yellow on the middle red stripe.

At the time of the Vera Cruz landing in 1914, a more distinctive standard was carried by Marines. The design consisted of a blue field with a laurel wreath encircling the Marine Corps emblem in the center. A scarlet ribbon above the emblem carried the words "U.S. Marine Corps," while another scarlet ribbon below the emblem carried the motto "Semper Fidelis."

Orders were issued on 2 April 1921 which directed all national colors be manufactured without the yellow fringe and without the words "U.S. Marine Corps" embroidered on the red stripe. This was followed by an order dated 14 March 1922, retiring from use all national colors still in use with yellow fringe or wording on the flag. Following World War I, the Army practice of attaching silver bands carrying inscriptions enumerating specific decorations and battles was adopted. This practice was discontinued on 23 January 1961.

Marine Corps Order No. 4 18 April 1925 designated gold and scarlet as the official colors of the U.S. Marine Corps. These colors, however, were not reflected in the official Marine Corps standard until 18 January 1939, when a new design incorporating the new colors was approved. The design was essentially that of today's Marine Corps standard.

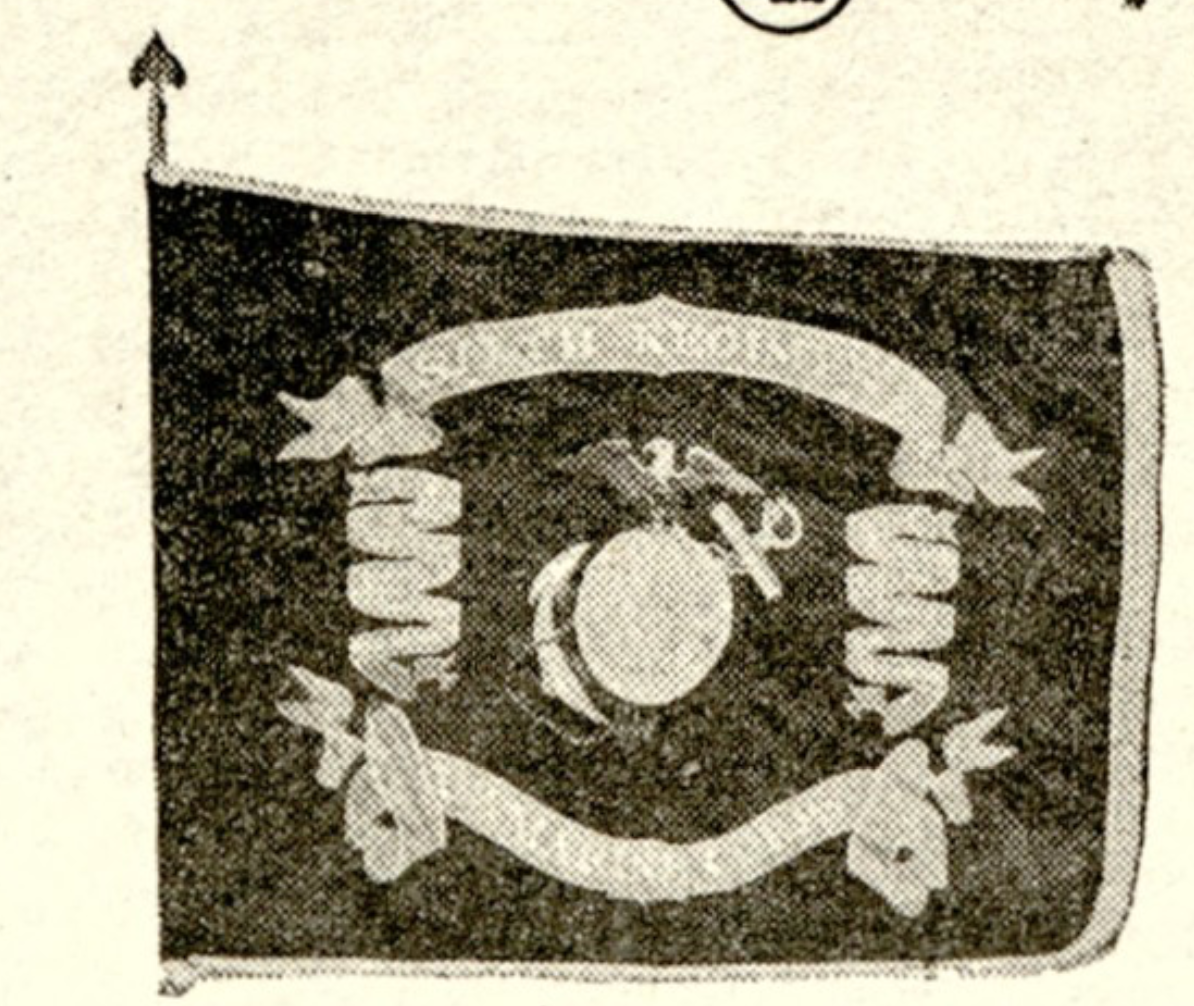
Flag of the 7th Marine Regiment, 1933

For a brief time following World War I, the inscribing of battle honors directly on the colors of a unit was in practice, but realization that a multiplicity of honors and the limited space on the colors made the system impractical, and the procedure was discontinued. On 29 July 1936, a Marine Corps Board recommended that the Army system of attaching streamers to the staff of the organizational colors be adopted. Such a system was finally authorized by Marine Corps Order No. 157, dated 3 November 1939, and is currently in practice. Devices are embroidered onto the streamer to denote special recognition or repeat awards. Unlike the Army and Air Force flags, only a single streamer is utilized for a single campaign, with the exception of those streamers that require more than eight devices, the maximum any one streamer may hold. Devices are only authorized for campaigns participated in the 20th and 21st centuries.

Historical Evolution of Marine Corps Flags
US Marine Corps Flag (c.1848) "Bush Flag"	United States Marines flag (c. 1861) carried by Marines during the Battle of Port Royal, 1861	The flag of the U.S. Marine Corps in the 1860s, notably during the American Civil War.	The flag of the U.S. Marine Corps from 1914 to 1939 often called "Old Blue."

=== Color Sergeant ===
The official battle color of the Corps is maintained by Marine Barracks, Washington, D.C. ("8th and I"), and carried by the Color Sergeant of the Marine Corps. The position of the Color Sergeant was first officially designated in 1965 and was first held by Gunnery Sgt. Shelton L. Eakin. The billet is a two-year tour open to all Sergeants; the only caveat being that the applicant must be at least 6 feet 0 inches (1.83 m) tall, as outlined by the drill manual of the United States Marine Corps and pass a rigorous White House security check. The Color Sergeant of the Marine Corps traditionally carries the flag of the president of the United States at state dinners and other official functions, and leads the color guard at various parades and ceremonies.

=== Streamers ===
The following streamers are authorized, in order of precedence:

Streamers
Order	Name	Image	Device(s)
1	Presidential Unit Citation (Navy)		(6 silver service stars, 3 bronze service stars)
2	Presidential Unit Citation (Army)		(1 silver oak leaf cluster)
3	Joint Meritorious Unit Award		
4	Naval Unit Commendation		(7 silver service stars)
5	Valorous Unit Award		
6	Meritorious Unit Commendation (Navy)		
7	Meritorious Unit Commendation (Army)		
8	Revolutionary War		
9	Quasi-War with France		
10	Barbary Wars		
11	War of 1812		
12	African Slave Trade		
13	Operations Against West Indian Pirates		
14	Indian Wars		
15	Mexican War		
16	Civil War Campaign		
17	Marine Corps Expeditionary x 2		(7 silver service stars) (5 silver service stars, 4 bronze service stars, Wake Island Device)
18	Spanish Campaign		
19	Philippine Campaign		
20	China Relief Expedition		
21	Cuban Pacification		
22	Nicaraguan Campaign		
23	Mexican Service		
24	Haitian Campaign		(1 bronze service star)
25	Dominican Campaign		
26	World War I Victory x 2		(1 silver service star, 1 bronze service star, Maltese Cross) "Siberia" and "West Indies"
27	Army of Occupation of Germany (1918-1923)		
28	Second Nicaraguan Campaign		
29	Yangtze Service		
30	China Service		(1 bronze service star)
31	American Defense Service		(1 bronze service star)
32	American Campaign		
33	European-African-Middle Eastern Campaign		(1 silver service star, 4 bronze service stars)
34	Asiatic-Pacific Campaign x 2		(6 silver service stars) (2 silver service stars, 4 bronze service stars)
35	World War II Victory		
36	Navy Occupation Service World War II		"Europe" and "Asia"
37	National Defense Service		(3 bronze service stars)
38	Korean Service		(2 silver service stars)
39	Armed Forces Expeditionary		(5 silver service stars)
40	Vietnam Service		(3 silver service stars, 3 bronze service stars)
41	Southwest Asia Service		(3 bronze service stars)
42	Philippine Defense		(1 bronze service star)
43	Philippine Liberation		(2 bronze service stars)
44	Philippine Independence		
45	Croix de Guerre, France World War I		(2 bronze palms, 1 silver gilt star)
46	Philippine Presidential Unit Citation		(3 bronze service stars)
47	Republic of Korea Presidential Unit Citation		
48	Republic of Vietnam Armed Forces Meritorious Unit Citation of the Gallantry Cross		(1 palm)
49	Republic of Vietnam Meritorious Unit Citation Civil Actions		(1 palm)
50	Kosovo Campaign		(2 bronze service stars)
51	Afghanistan Campaign		(1 silver service star, 1 bronze service star)
52	Iraq Campaign		(1 silver service star, 2 bronze service stars)
53	Global War on Terrorism Expeditionary		(1 silver service star, 1 bronze service star)
54	Global War on Terrorism Service		
55	Inherent Resolve Campaign		(2 bronze service stars)

- Note that a "x #" designation denotes the number of 4 foot streamers used to carry devices, not the number of awards. Devices are separated to indicate the intended division among multiple streamers.

== Organizational Battle Colors ==
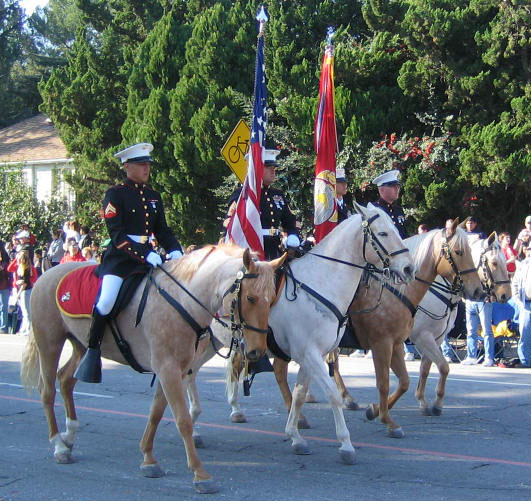
The only horse-mounted color guard in the Corps at the 2007 Tournament of Roses Parade

Each unit in the Corps of battalion-size or larger also hold an organizational color (which makes up the unit's colors along with the national flag). It is usually identical to the Marine Corps battle color, though the scroll will have the unit's name instead of "United States Marine Corps". It will also bear the streamers authorized to the unit, or scarlet and gold tassels if none are authorized.

Each Corps unit has a designated color guard, led by a color sergeant. He is entrusted with the care of the unit colors, which are a symbol of the United States, the Marine Corps, and the commander him/herself. The organizational colors are often passed as part of change of command ceremonies to symbolize the transfer of office. When not in use as part of a parade or ceremony, the colors are traditionally kept in the commander's office.

== Guidons ==
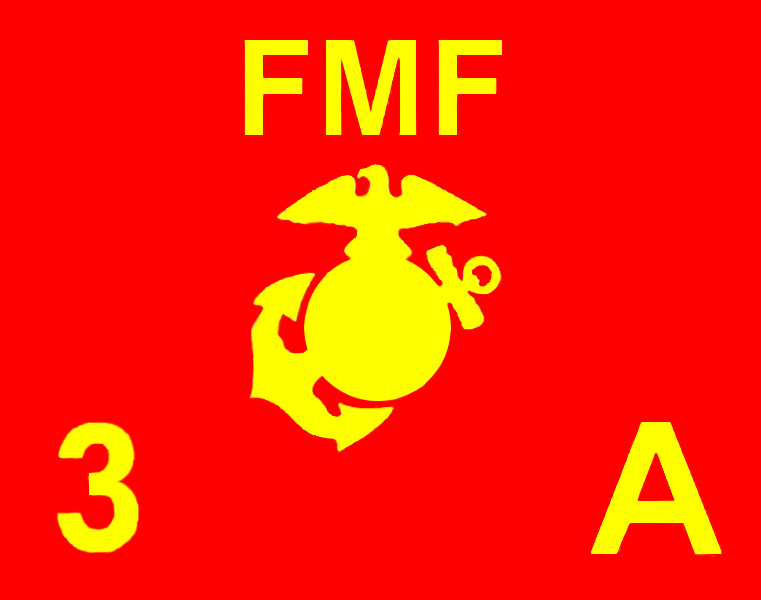
A guidon for Company A, 1st Battalion, 3rd Marines

A Marine guidon is always rectangular, 22 by 28 inches (56 by 71 cm), with a scarlet field and gold lettering, and an Eagle, Globe, and Anchor centered.

Fleet Marine Forces units have "FMF" emblazoned above an Eagle, Globe, and Anchor (EGA), reserve units display "USMCR", and all others have "USMC". The regimental level numeral will be displayed in the lower left corner, unless a higher or lower command numeral provides better identification (for example, a battalion's headquarters company would display that battalion's numeral instead of the regiment). The company-level designation letter, abbreviated title, or number will be in the lower right corner.

No additional attachments are authorized, including streamers, bands, or the like. Some units incorporate additional banners or mascots into unofficial guidons.

Guidons are used in the same manner as colors for a company- or platoon-sized unit. Much like the colors, the guidon represents the unit commander. It is entrusted to the unit guide for parades and ceremonies, and displayed in or near the commander's office when he or she is present.

Guidons are also used in recruit training to identify individual platoons. First and second phase platoons have a gold background with their four-digit platoon number in scarlet, while third phase platoons have a scarlet background with gold lettering and trim. The guidon is used as an aid to instilling unit identity and pride, representing the platoon. Some drill instructors will test that pride by attempting to dishonor the guidon and expecting the recruits to intervene. Also, the recruit assigned to carry it, the guide, is treated as the most senior recruit of the platoon, and uses the guidon to marks the line of advance in close order drill.

== Personal flags ==
General-grade officers and the Commandant of the Marine Corps are authorized a personal flag, which displays their rank insignia. A red background with white stars are used, while the Commandant also has a grey and gold Eagle, Globe, and Anchor. These flags are often used to mark a command headquarters in garrison, as well as a symbol for the general themself. Much like a guidon, they are displayed when the general is present, and stowed when not; visiting officers and officials often have their personal flags displayed as a courtesy.

Personal flags of the Commandant, a general, lieutenant general, major general, and brigadier general

== Shared aspects ==
Spearhead

All U.S. Marine flags share a similar wooden staff and silver spearhead and ferrule. The base of the spearhead is used to support streamers or tassels if authorized. Older organizational colors may also have silver bands, awarded for participation in a battle or campaign, though the practice has been discontinued for all but the Corp's main battle colors.

A color mounted on a vehicle of some type is referred to as a standard. When the national flag is flown from a ship, it is referred to as the national ensign.

== See also ==
- Color guard
- Flags of the United States Armed Forces
- Guidon (United States)
