= Kern Veterans Memorial =

Monument in Kern County, California, U.S.

- County of Kern
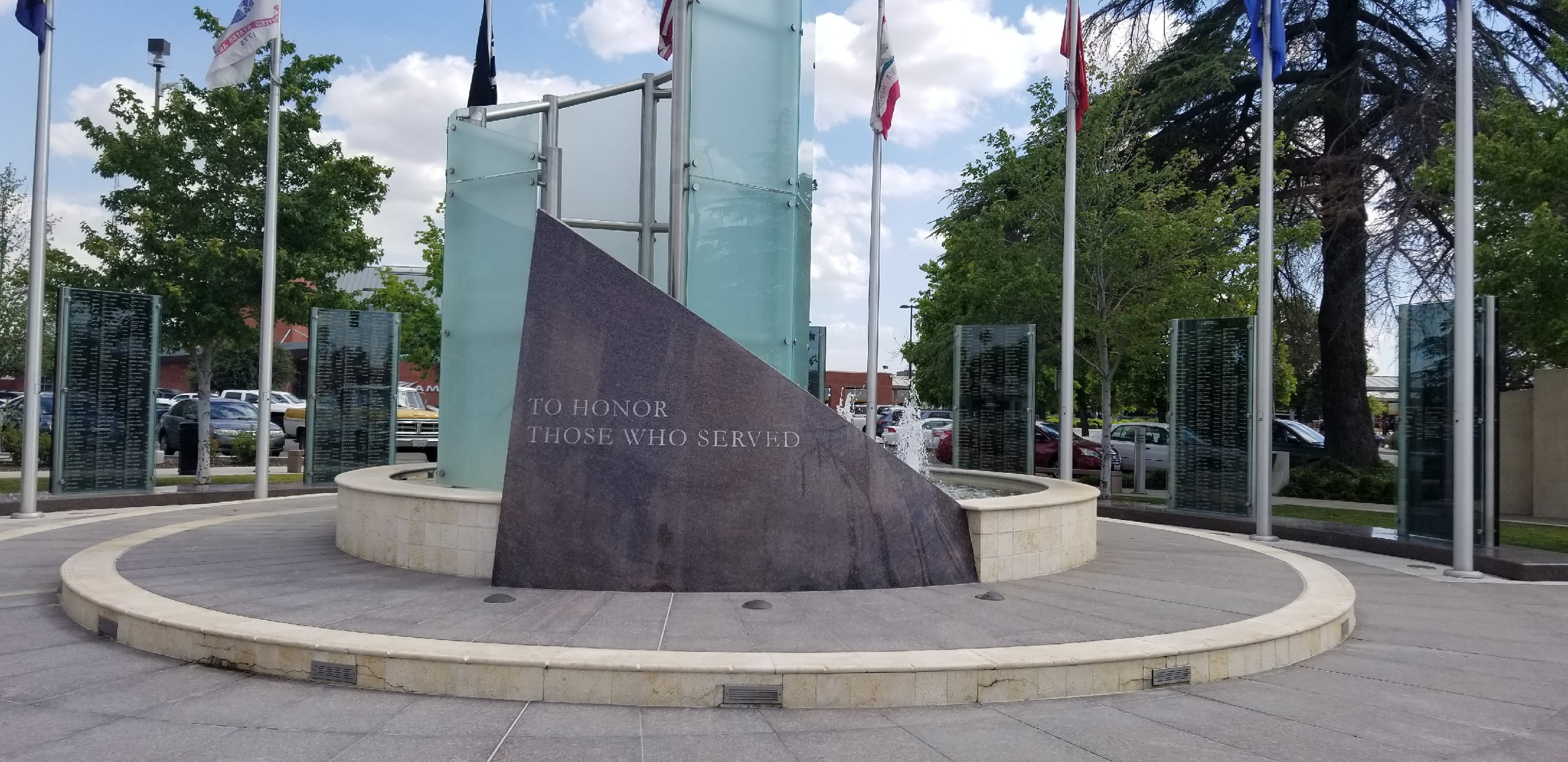
- For all Kern County Veterans
- Unveiled: November 11, 2007
- Location: 35°22′23″N 119°00′29″W; Bakersfield, California
- Designed by: John Cohrs
- To honor all those who served

The Kern Veterans Memorial is a monument located in Kern County, California. It honors all Kern County residents who served in the armed forces, both in peacetime and in war. It is located in downtown Bakersfield, at the corner of Truxtun Ave. and S St. The memorial is adjacent to the Kern County Visitors Bureau, Bakersfield Amtrak Station, and Beale Memorial Library. It is also in between the two segments of Mill Creek.

== Description ==
The memorial was designed by John Cohrs. It is a circular plaza, with two paths. The outer path is level while the inner path ascends to a second level. In the center is a fountain, with both granite and glass spiraling upward to a point. The inscription on the granite reads "To honor all those who served." At night, lights in the fountain reflect off of the glass in rotating colors of red, white, and blue. The fountain is also used to cover the noise of the busy Truxtun Avenue, which is directly adjacent.

Along the outer path of the memorial are nine flags. They are: United States of America, State of California, Army, Navy, Air Force, Marines, Coast Guard, Merchant Marines, and POW/MIA. In between the flag poles will be the wall of valor (a part of phase II). It list the names of those people who were killed or missing in action during wartime. The names are etched in glass panels, and painted in gold for visibility.

The Kern Veterans Memorial Foundation describes the symbolic design of the memorial as:

originally a labyrinth, a spiritual meditation tool that represents a journey to our center and back again out into the world. Inherent in a memorial is a memory and reflection, a place for contemplation and understanding. The path around the memorial will consist of an outer ring that is level and continuous. From this place, one can take a journey that describes deep the memories. At the Center of the memorial there will be another level place that contains a sculpture piece. The sculpture will represent the strength and sacrifices of the veterans.

— Kern Veterans Memorial Foundation

The memorial also contains a kiosk, which allows a person to search for the names of a veteran. It contains information about the veterans: years of service, awards received, and brief biographical description. This unique onsite database allows someone to visualize the people who served in our armed forces.

During the planning of the memorial, the Department of Veterans Affairs listed about 350 Kern County veterans who were killed or missing in action. With the work of citizens, especially the Achieve class at Bakersfield High School, an additional 657 veterans were discovered for a total of approximately 1007. That class also researched the 1007 veterans for information used in the kiosk.

== Future ==
Phase II will involve constructing the final parts of the memorial. After about six months on display, the wall of valor was removed so new panels could be ordered with any previously omitted names added. Also, in response to a public suggestion, the names will be painted in gold so they can be easily seen in the daylight. The kiosk, currently housed in a temporary wooden structure, will be replaced with granite walls and a stainless steel roof. As of 2008, the Kern Veterans Foundation was about $300,000 short of reaching their goal. There is currently no construction date, but will most likely start when enough funds have been raised.
