= Bakersfield Department of Economic and Community Development =

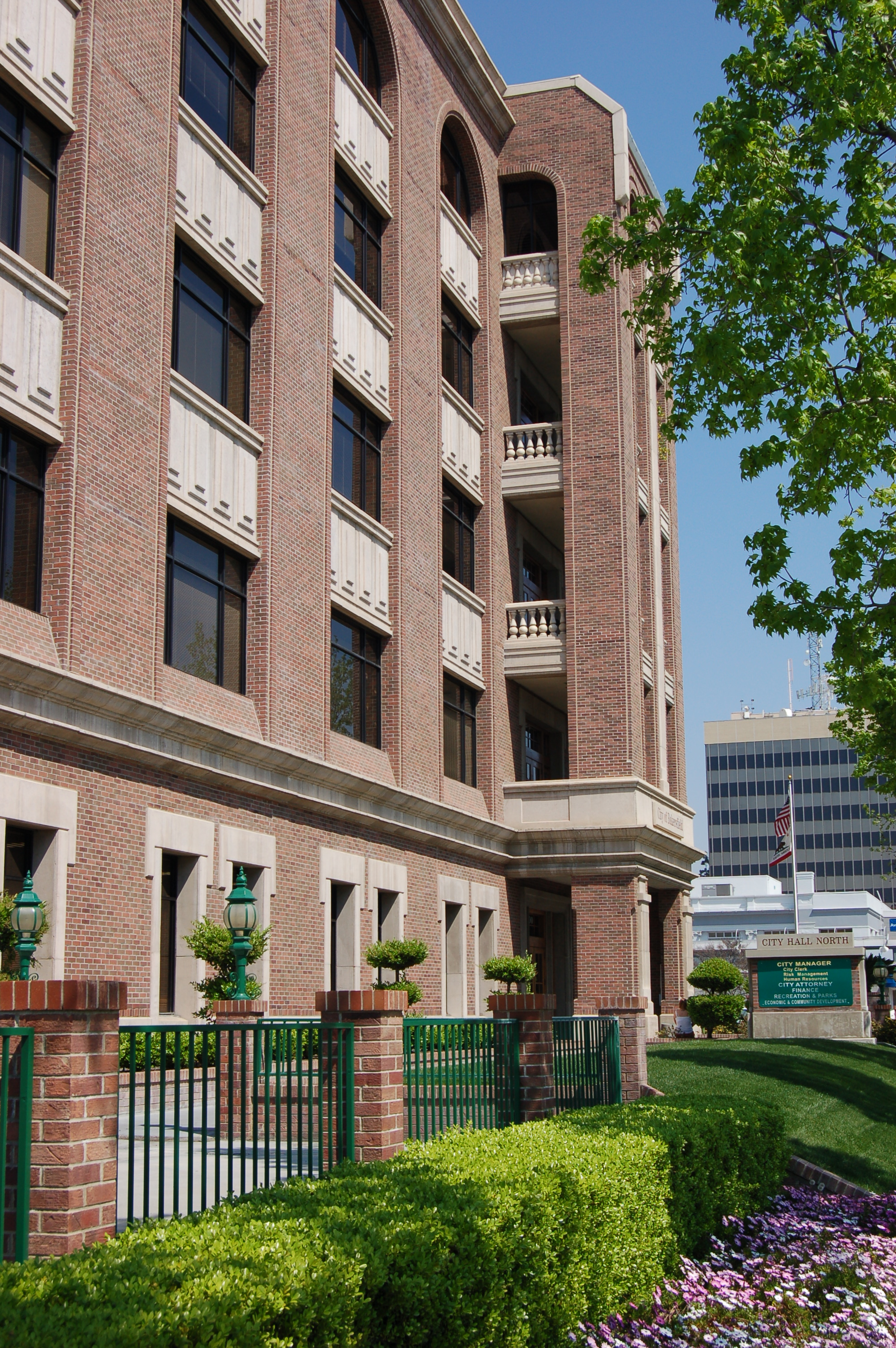
- Department Headquarters

Agency overview
- Formed: 1960
- Jurisdiction: Bakersfield, California
- Headquarters: City Hall North
- Annual budget: $16 million (2010-11)
- Agency executive: Donna Kunz, Economic Development Director
- Website: bakersfieldcity.us/edcd

Bakersfield Department of Economic and Community Development is a department of the city of Bakersfield, California, United States. It is responsible for attracting new businesses and visitors to the city. It also acts as a liaison between businesses and the city government. In addition, the department is also responsible for encouraging redevelopment. It also distributes federal/state redevelopment and housing grants. The department is also in charge of the Bakersfield Register of Historic Places (should not be confused with the National Register of Historic Places), which is a local register of historic places in the city.

== History ==
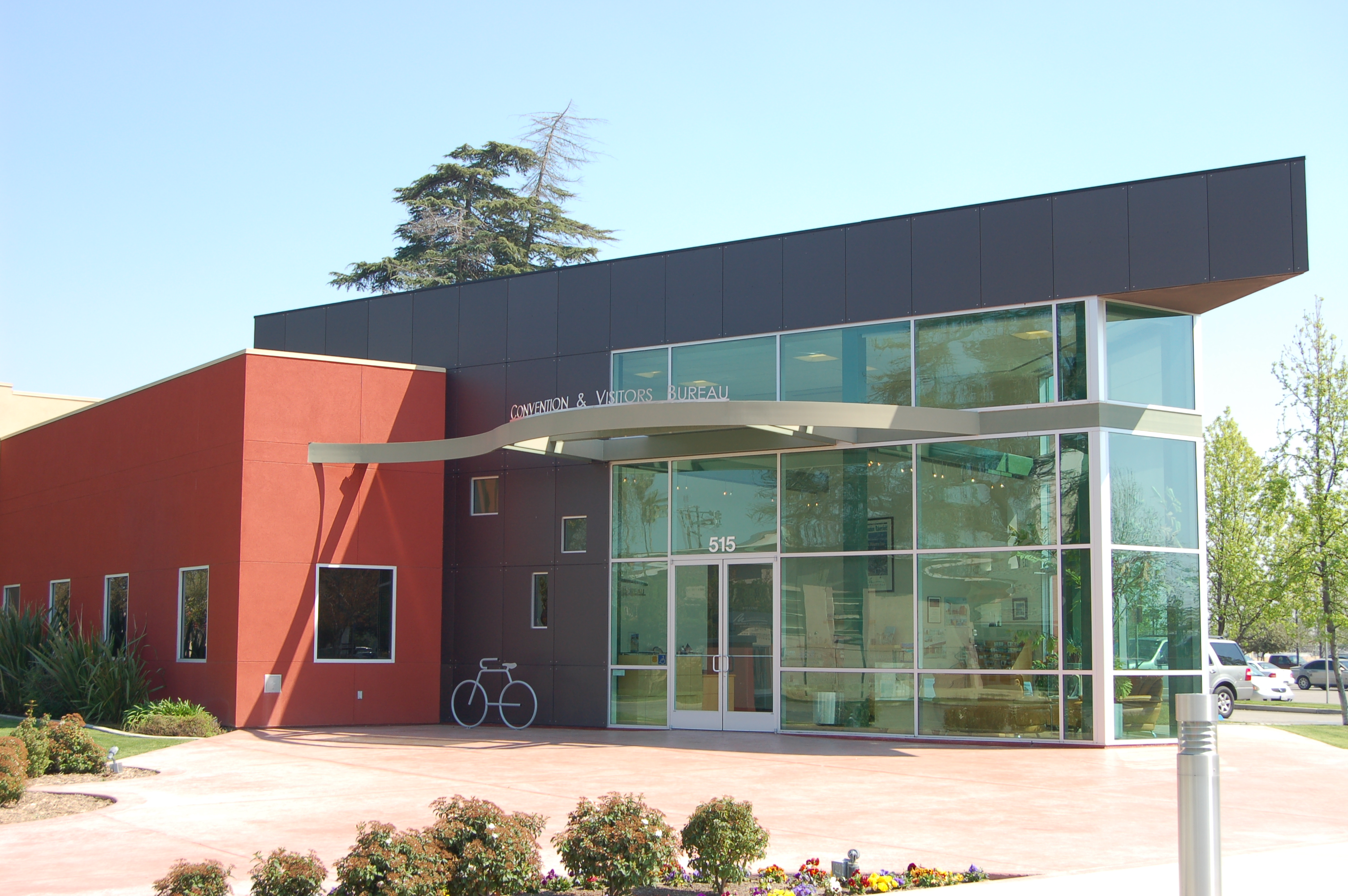
The Visitor and Convention Bureau (a division of the department) is located adjacent to the train station and Kern Veterans Memorial.

The department was founded in 1960, in conjunction with the start of construction of the Civic Auditorium (later renamed Rabobank Theater and Convention Center). In addition to running the auditorium and convention center, it started promoting Bakersfield to outside companies and visitors. The goal was to increase the number of companies doing business within the city. The department would continue to run the facilities until 1998 and the construction of the Centennial Garden (later renamed Rabobank Arena). At that time, management of the facilities was turned over to SMG.

In 1972, a new focus was added to the department. With the city growing outward, the inner core began to fall into disrepair. As a result, the redevelopment division was added to the department. Its focus was to designate redevelopment districts, where financial incentives were offered for construction, rehabilitation, and relocation. The first district was Downtown. Later, additional districts were added to East Bakersfield and the Southeast.

In 1984, a third focus was added to the department. The city created the Bakersfield Historical Preservation Commission. Traditionally, historical identification and preservation fell to private organizations (such as the Kern County Historical Society). This was the first time the city government would recognize and preserve historical landmarks.
