= Flags of the United States Armed Forces =

Banners which represent branches of US military forces

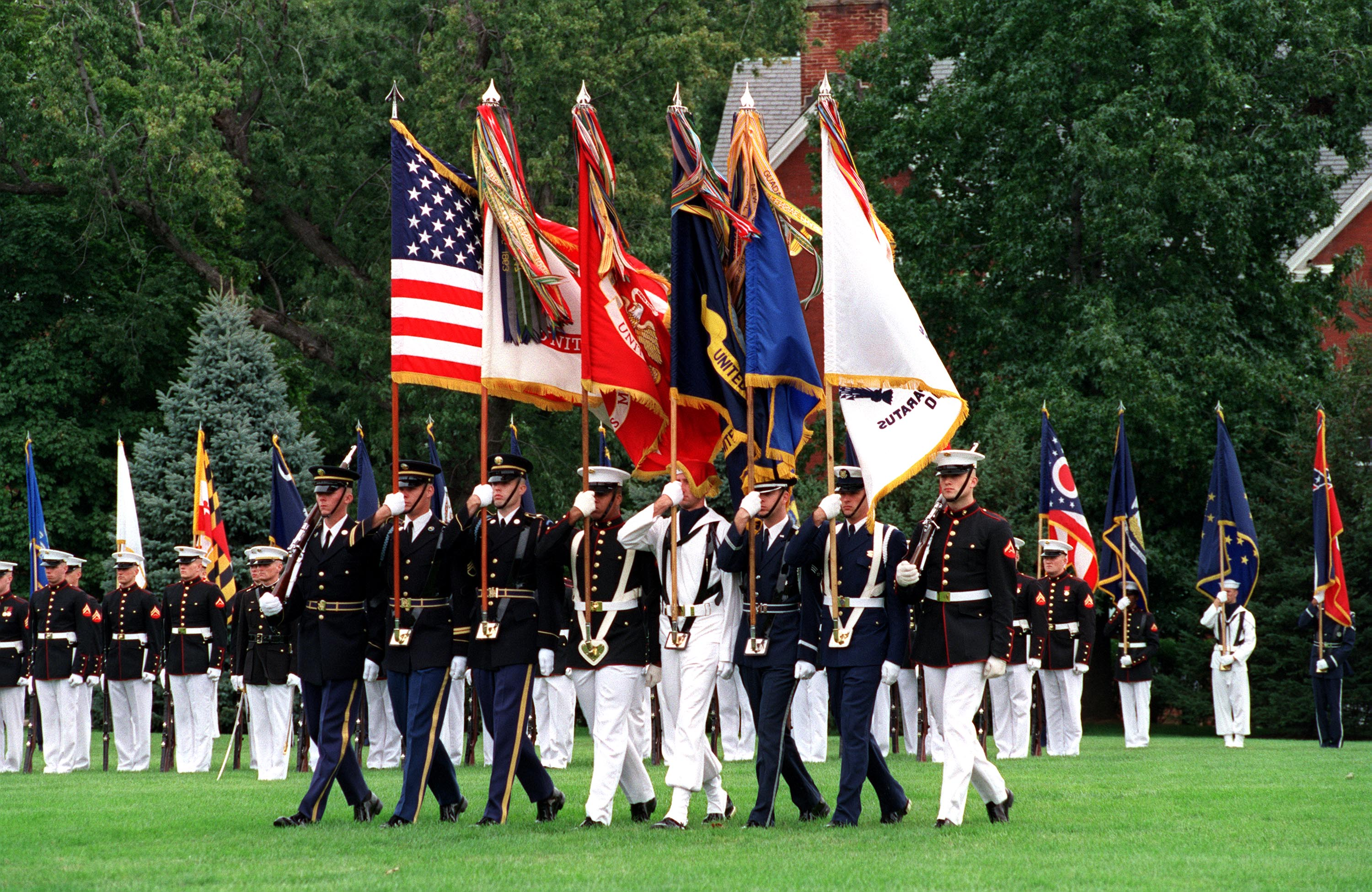
The U.S. Joint Service Color Guard on parade at Fort Myer, Virginia in October 2001. This joint color guard shows the organizational colors of each branch (left to right): National, U.S. Army, U.S. Marine Corps, U.S. Navy, U.S. Air Force, and the U.S. Coast Guard.

The several branches of the United States Armed Forces are represented by flags. Within the U.S. military, various flags fly on various occasions, and on various ships, bases, camps, and military academies.

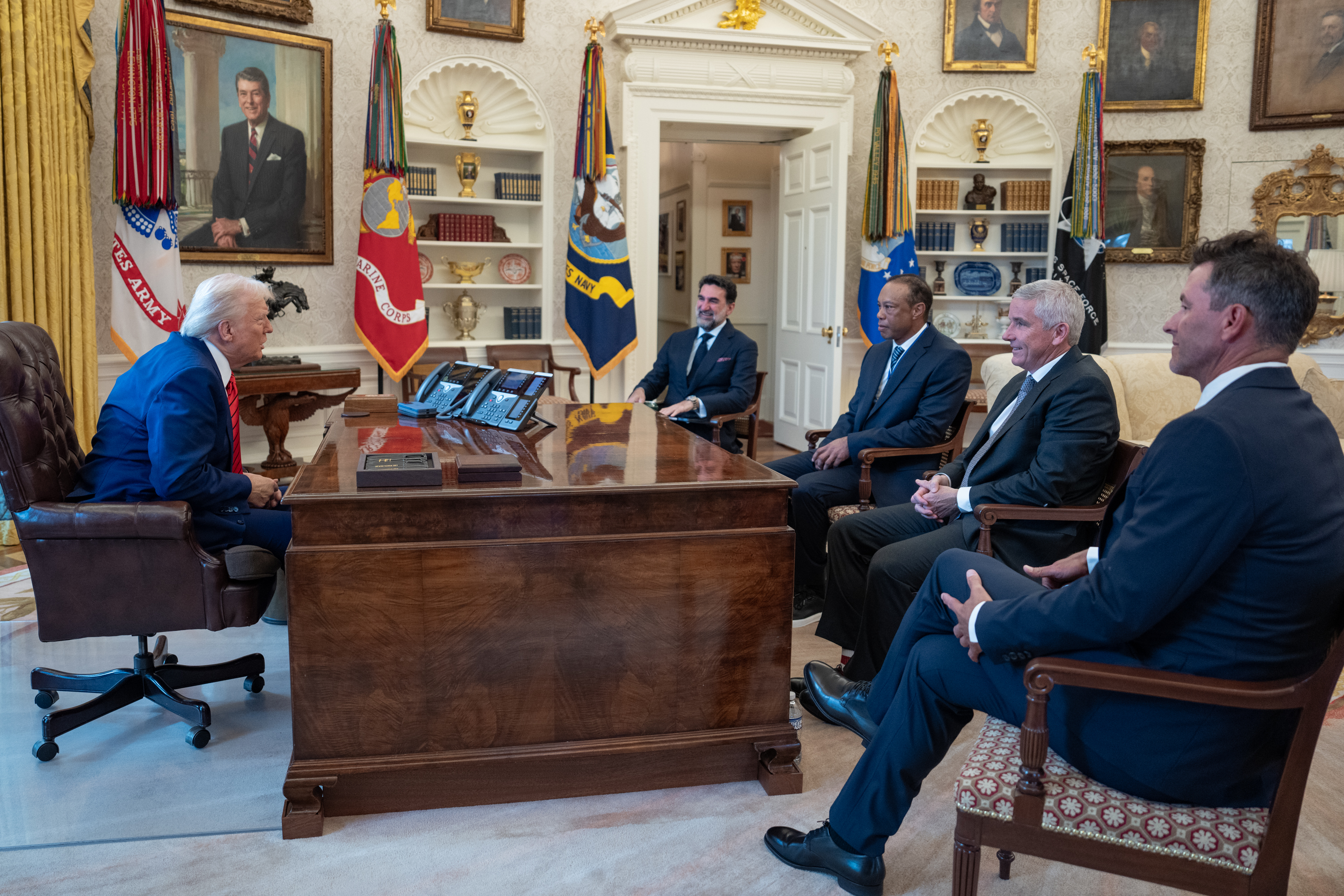
Flags of the Army, Marines, Navy, Air Force and Space Force being decorated in the Oval Office

In general, the order of precedence (from viewer's left to right) when displaying flags together in a military context is to display the U.S. national flag (also known as the "colors" or "national colors"), followed by the flags of the U.S. Army, U.S. Marine Corps, U.S. Navy, U.S. Air Force, U.S. Space Force, and U.S. Coast Guard. If the U.S. Coast Guard is transferred to the Department of the Navy, the U.S. Coast Guard flag would precede the U.S. Air Force flag.

== Service flags ==
Flag of the U.S. Army

Flag of the U.S. Marine Corps

Flag of the U.S. Navy

Flag of the U.S. Air Force

Flag of the U.S. Space Force

Flag of the U.S. Coast Guard

== Maritime flags ==
Many maritime flags have been used in the United States.

All maritime vessels and naval warships belonging to the United States (with a few exceptions such as U.S. Coast Guard vessels) fly the ensign of the United States, which is identical to the national flag of the United States (though originally was a design similar to the Continental Union Flag). All documented U.S. vessels, and all U.S. vessels in international or foreign waters, are required to display this ensign between 08:00 and sunset. Conversely, vessels of the U.S. Coast Guard display a unique ensign as a demonstration of its authority to stop, board, search, and conduct arrests and seizures aboard vessels subject to United States jurisdiction. Historically, the ensign displayed has changed as the flag of the United States has changed. Similarly, vessels of the Continental Navy flew many varied ensigns due to a vague standard set by the Continental Congress, the arrangement of stars and pattern of stripes being left to the commander's interpretations.

Vessels of the U.S. Navy, Coast Guard, Military Sealift Command, and National Oceanic and Atmospheric Administration display the jack of the United States from the jackstaff. Originally the First Navy Jack was displayed, a design containing the thirteen red and white stripes; while some maintain that it was superimposed by an uncoiled rattlesnake and the motto "Dont tread on me" [sic], reminiscent of the Gadsden flag. It was later changed to a blue canton with white stars, the "Union Jack", and updated as each state entered the Union. However, all warships were directed to fly the First Navy Jack, including the disputed rattlesnake and motto, since the duration of the war on terror in 2002. On 21 February 2019, the Chief of Naval Operations directed that U.S. Navy warships fly the U.S. jack again beginning on 4 June 2019.

A Commissioning or Masthead pennant is flown from the masthead and represents the commission of the captain of the ship (and thus of the ship itself). Additionally, a Church pennant may be flown during religious services. This pennant, white with a blue cross (or blue tablets and Star of David for Jewish services), is the only flag authorized to be flown above the national ensign, and only when at sea. In addition, hospital ships display the Red Cross.

Ships and units ashore may also fly burgees displaying unit citations. Flags can also be used for signaling.

National ensign, 1960–present

"First Navy Ensign"
(naval ensign, 1776–1777)

Coast Guard Ensign

"First Navy Jack"
(naval jack, 2002–2019)

"Union Jack"
(naval jack, 1960–2002, 2019–present;
government jack, 1960–present)

Naval jack, 1776–1777 (probable)

Commissioning pennant

Church pennants

Jewish worship pennants

Red Cross (hospital ships)

== Personal flags ==
Officers with certain offices or billets, as well as all generals and admirals, have a personal flag assigned to represent their authority and/or command, thus they are often referred to as "flag officers". Ashore, the flags are usually displayed within the owner's office or raised on a secondary flagstaff near the unit colors, while if the officer embarked they are flown aboard ship according to rank. The appearance consists of a number of stars equal to the officer's rank insignia, the colors determined by service: red with white stars for the Army and Marine Corps, blue with white stars for Naval commanders and Air Force. Certain staff and non-line officers have unique colors: white with blue stars for non-command Navy admirals, while Army chaplains and medical generals use ecclesiastical purple and maroon backgrounds, respectively.

Unique flags are given to the President (due to his position as Commander-in-Chief), Vice President, Secretary of Defense, Deputy Secretary of Defense, Under Secretaries of Defense, and Assistant Secretaries of Defense, each of the Secretaries of the Military Departments (Secretary of the Army, Secretary of the Navy, Secretary of the Air Force), Under Secretaries of the Military Departments (Under Secretary of the Army, Under Secretary of the Navy, Under Secretary of the Air Force), and Assistant Secretaries of the Military Departments (Assistant Secretary of the Army, Assistant Secretary of the Navy, Assistant Secretary of the Air Force), the Chairman of the Joint Chiefs of Staff, Vice Chairman of the Joint Chiefs of Staff and Senior Enlisted Advisor of the Joint Chiefs of Staff, and the chief of the Military Services (Chief of Staff of the Army, Commandant of the Marine Corps, Chief of Naval Operations, Chief of Staff of the Air Force, Chief of Space Operations, and Commandant of the Coast Guard). An admiral, acting commodore, or Convoy Commodore aboard a ship each may fly a flag from their flagship.

In addition, the Navy will display the flag of the Secretary of State when the secretary is embarked as the representative of the United States. Other diplomatic personnel are also afforded a consular flag when embarked. The Coast Guard, being part of the Department of Homeland Security, will utilize the Secretary's flag much like the Navy will utilize the SecDef's.

Flag of the president of the United States

Flag of the vice president of the United States
Flag of the Secretary of Defense

Flag of the Deputy Secretary of Defense

Flag of the Under Secretary of Defense
Flag of the Secretary of the Army

Flag of the Secretary of the Navy

Flag of the Secretary of the Air Force
Flag of the Under Secretary of the Army

Flag of the Under Secretary of the Navy

Flag of the Under Secretary of the Air Force
Flag of an Assistant Secretary of the Army

Flag of the Assistant Secretary of the Navy

Flag of the Assistant Secretary of the Air Force
Flag of the Chairman of the Joint Chiefs of Staff

Flag of the Vice Chairman of the Joint Chiefs of Staff
Flag of the Chief of Staff of the Army

Flag of the Commandant of the Marine Corps

Flag of the
Chief of Naval Operations

Flag of the Chief of Staff of the Air Force

Flag of the Chief of Space Operations

Flag of the Commandant of the Coast Guard

Flag of the Chief of the National Guard Bureau
Flag of the Vice Chief of Staff of the Army

Flag of the Vice Chief of Naval Operations

Flag of the Vice Chief of Staff of the Air Force

Flag of the Vice Chief of Space Operations

Flag of the Vice Commandant of the United States Coast Guard

Flag of the Vice Chief of the National Guard Bureau
Flag of the Senior Enlisted Advisor to the Chairman of the Joint Chiefs of Staff

Flag of the Sergeant Major of the Army

Flag of the Chief Master Sergeant of the Air Force

Flag of the Chief Master Sergeant of the Space Force
Flag of the Supreme Allied Commander Europe
Flag of the Chief of the United States Army Reserve

Flag of the United States Army Surgeon General

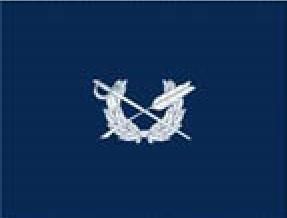
Flag of the Judge Advocate General of the United States Army

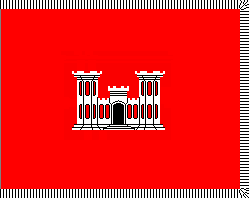
Flag of the Chief of Engineers of the United States Army

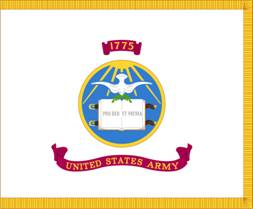
Flag of the Chief of Chaplains of the United States Army

Flag of the United States Army Provost Marshal General

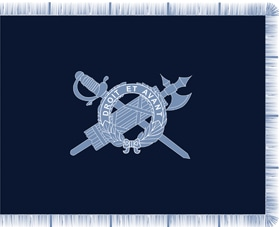
Flag of the Inspector General of the United States Army
Flag of a general of the Army

Flag of a Navy fleet admiral

Flag of a general of the Air Force
Flag of an Army general

Flag of a Marine Corps general

Flag of a Navy admiral

Flag of an Air Force general

Flag of a Space Force general

Flag of a Coast Guard admiral
Flag of an Army lieutenant general

Flag of a Marine Corps lieutenant general

Flag of a Navy vice admiral

Flag of an Air Force lieutenant general

Flag of a Space Force lieutenant general

Flag of a Coast Guard vice admiral
Flag of an Army major general

Flag of a Marine Corps major general

Flag of a Navy rear admiral

Flag of a Air Force major general

Flag of a Space Force major general

Flag of a Coast Guard rear admiral
Flag of an Army brigadier general

Flag of a Marine Corps brigadier general

Flag of a Navy rear admiral (lower half)

Flag of a Air Force brigadier general

Flag of a Space Force brigadier general

Flag of a Coast Guard rear admiral (lower half)

== Others ==
Many other flags are traditionally associated with the military.

=== American Revolution ===
Not having made an official design until 1777, numerous distinct flags were carried into battle by American forces. Even after, the vague wording of the Flag Resolution of 1777 led to many designs.

- The most commonly carried pre-1777 flags was the Continental Union Flag, resembling closely the flag of the British East India Company.
- The Gadsden flag was created from a political cartoon, it was first seen carried into battle by Continental Marines.
- Legend holds that the Betsy Ross flag was the first version of the current American flag, and is depicted in artwork featuring General George Washington.
- The Francis Hopkinson version is also claimed to be the first flag carried into battle by American troops.
- The Serapis ensign was flown from the captured HMS Serapis due to the loss of the standard ensign during the Battle of Flamborough Head.
- The Cowpens flag was depicted as being carried by the 3rd Maryland Regiment at the Battle of Cowpens (while proven that the unit was not at Cowpens, the name and pattern remained popular).
- The Bennington flag is commonly held to have been carried by American troops at the Battle of Bennington.
- The Guilford Courthouse flag was carried by the North Carolina militia at the Battle of Guilford Court House.
- Several versions of the Flag of New England were carried by New England militias, especially noted at the Battle of Bunker Hill.
- The Pine Tree Flag found some limited use as a jack by early Naval vessels and boats.
- The Bedford Flag was one of the first battle standards of the American military.
- The Brandywine flag was carried by the 7th Pennsylvania Regiment at the Battle of Brandywine.
- The 2nd Canadian Regiment, not being American, carried their own flag into battle when fighting for the Continental Army.
- The Commander-in-Chief's Guard carried a unique banner while they protected General Washington.
- The Flag of the Green Mountain Boys was the battle color of the Green Mountain Boys and the Vermont Republic prior to its admission to the Union.
- The Fort Mercer Flag which had an inverted color scheme.

=== Others ===
- The Star Spangled Banner Flag or Great Garrison Flag was flown over Fort McHenry during the Battle of Baltimore in the War of 1812, inspiring Francis Scott Key to write the poem "The Star-Spangled Banner". It ultimately became the U.S. national anthem.
- A flag proclaiming "Come and take it", in reference to a cannon the Mexican Army was attempting to seize, was fashioned by Texans at the Battle of Gonzales.
- The brief existence of the Confederate States of America yielded the creation of several flags used by the Confederate Army and Navy.
- The Fort Sumter Flag gained significance for its unique canton and its lowering at the Battle of Fort Sumter.
- Old Glory gained fame in the story of Captain William Driver keeping it safe from Confederate capture and eventually became the nickname for the Flag of the United States itself.
- The POW/MIA flag became a symbol of concern about military personnel taken as prisoners of war and missing in action.
- Recipients of the Medal of Honor also receive a flag based upon the design of the ribbon.
- The Air National Guard uses a unique flag in addition to the Air Force flag.
- The United States Coast Guard Auxiliary uses a flag based on the flag of the United States Coast Guard.
- The Civil Air Patrol uses a flag based on the Air Force flag.
- "Don't Give Up the Ship", words on the battle flag of Oliver Hazard Perry aboard the brig USS Niagara in 1813.
- The United States Space Command uses a unique flag along with the flags of the service flags.

== See also ==
- Guidon (United States)
