= Flag and general officer flags of United States military =

For the general term see: Flag Officer

Captain was the highest rank in the United States Navy from its beginning in 1775 until 1857. The early United States republic felt that the title Admiral was "too royal" for a country without a king. By 1852, the Navy had the ranks of Captain, Senior Captain and Commander-in-Chief of a Squadron.

From at least the early 1800s, commodores flew broad pennants as a sign of their command, an early example of this was Commodore William Bainbridge who flew one from his command the USS President in 1808 . These pennants were usually swallow-tailed and blue after the tradition of the British Royal Navy.

== First flag officers ==
In 1857, Congress created the temporary rank of flag officer, which was bestowed on senior Navy captains who were assigned to lead a squadron of vessels in addition to command of their own ship. This temporary usage gave way to the permanent ranks of commodore and rear admiral in 1862. The 1857 regulations allowed for a solid color rectangular flag to indicate a flag officer - blue represented the senior flag officer, red for the next most senior if two or more were present and white the third most senior. Otherwise a flag officer flew a blue flag and this would continue for Commodores until 1865.

US Navy Flag Officer Flags 1857-1865
US Navy Senior Flag Officer (later Commodore) 1857-1865	US Navy First Subordinate Flag Officer (later Commodore) 1857-1865	US Navy Second Most Subordinate Flag Officer (later Commodore) 1857-1865

== First U.S. Navy admirals ==
Arguably the most famous naval figure of the US Civil War, David Farragut, was one of the first Flag Officers and in 1862 after capturing New Orleans, Congress made him a Rear Admiral. After the Battle of Mobile Bay he was made a Vice Admiral and finally after the war ended a full Admiral.

In 1865, the Navy regulations specified the flags of Vice and Rear Admirals. A Vice admiral was to have a blue flag with three white stars arranged in an equilateral triangle and a Rear admiral will have two stars arranged vertically. A Commodore's broad pennant will hold one white star on a blue pennant.

US Navy Flag Officer's Flags 1865 Regulations
Vice Admiral's Flag 1865 Navy Regulations	Rear Admiral's Flag 1865 Navy Regulations	Commodore's Broad Pennant 1865 Navy Regulations

From 1865 until 1915, no officer was promoted to Admiral except in special circumstances. The Congress felt that the rank of Admiral was a reward for gallantry in battle and not something the country should enshrine permanently. After the Civil War, there were only two men promoted to Admiral - George Dewey in 1899 and David Dixon Porter in 1870.

For a brief time, between 1870 and 1876, the Navy dropped the easy to recognize system of stars on flags, for the more complex flags of 13 stripes (resembling the first Navy Jack) and stars.

US Navy Flag Officer's Flags 1870
Flag of a United States Navy Admiral At The Main 1870	Flag of a United States Navy Vice Admiral 1870	Flag of a United States Navy Rear Admiral 1870	Broad Pennant of a US Navy Commodore 1870

The 1876 Signal Book showed that there were four stars in a diamond shape on an Admiral's flag (for Porter) as well as red and white flags for both Rear Admirals and Commodores to indicate subordinates as with the previous Flag Officer flags of 1857.

US Navy Flag Officer's Flags 1876 Regulations
Admiral's Flag 1876 Navy Regulations	Vice Admiral's Flag 1876 Navy Regulations	Rear Admiral's Flag 1876 Navy Regulations	Commodore's Broad Pennant 1876 Navy Regulations
		Rear Admiral First Subordinate's Flag 1876 Regulations	Commodore First Subordinate's Broad Pennant 1876 Regulations
		Rear Admiral Second Subordinate's Flag 1876 Regulations	Commodore Second Subordinate's Broad Pennant 1876 Regulations

== General officer flags ==
In 1903, the War Department first authorized flags for US Army general officers. The first flags were "boat flags" for when army officers visited navy ships. By 1923, these flags were expanded so that they were also for use on automobiles and field or office flags. Line officers were to have a scarlet flag with one to four stars based on rank. General staff officers flags would be in the colors of their branch with one or two stars and their branch insignia.

US Army General Officers Field / Office Flags 1923
Brigadier General's Flag 1923	Major General's Flag 1926	Lieutenant General's Flag 1923	General's Flag 1923
	US Army Air Corps 2 Star 1923		
Adjutant Generals Corps Major General's Flag 1923	Air Corps Major General's Flag 1923	Chemical Corps Major General's Flag 1923	Coastal Artillery Corps Major General's Flag 1923
Engineer Corps Brigadier General's Flag 1923	Finance Corps Major General's Flag 1923	General Staff Corps Major General's Flag 1923	Inspector General Corps Brigadier General's Flag 1923
Bureau of Insular Affairs Brigadier General's Flag 1923	Judge Advocate Corps Brigadier General's Flag 1923	Militia Bureau Major General's Flag 1923	Medical Department Brigadier General's Flag 1923
Ordnance Corps Major Generals Flag 1923	Quartermaster Corps Brigadier General's Flag 1923	Signal Corps Major General's Flag 1923	Transportation Corps Major General's Flag (1942-1947)
US Army Chief of Infantry Flag 1923	US Army Chief of Artillery 1923	US Army Chief of Cavalry 1923	

== Marine Corps commandant flags ==
In the 1920s, the Marine Corps first gave a flag to their commandant who was, at the time a major general. In 1942 it was redesigned to reflect that their commandant was now a lieutenant general and again in 1945 when their commandant was a full general. The 1945 design would last until at least the early Cold War era when it would be replaced by the current design.

Flag Officer flags of the Commandant of the Marine Corps
Flag of the Commandant of the Marine Corps 1920s	Flag of the Commandant of the Marine Corps 1942	Flag of the Commandant of the Marine Corps 1945	Flag of the Commandant of the Marine Corps, Present Day

== NOAA Corps flag officers ==
In 1934, the US Coast & Geodetic Survey created a new director's flag with a white triangle representing the C&GS and two white stars representing a Rear Admiral. In 1936, Raymond Patton became the first Director of the C&GS that was a Rear Admiral. In 1965, the C&GS made Henry A. Karo the first Vice Admiral as the organization became the Environmental Science Services Administration Corps. Finally, in 1985, the NOAA Corps like the other services split their Rear Admirals into a 2-star and 1-star version (Rear Admiral Lower Half).

US NOAA Corps Flag Officer flags
NOAA Corps Vice Admiral's Flag 1965	NOAA Corps Rear Admiral's Flag 1934	NOAA Corps Rear Admiral Lower Half's Flag 1985

== Modern U.S. Navy admiral's flags ==
In 1940, the Navy dropped the red and white subordinate flags for Rear Admirals and Commodores. And in 1944 when the Navy created the rank of Fleet Admiral, they also authorized a new blue flag with five white stars arranged in a pentagon shape. The most recent change was in 1948, when the Chief of Naval Operations created white flags for non-line officers such as medical, supply, chaplains, engineers, etc. The new flags would be for ranks of Rear Admiral (Lower Half) through Admiral. Commodore rank was retired in 1948 as was any future promotions to Fleet Admiral. Both Rear Admiral (Lower Half) and Rear Admirals used a two-star flag.

US Navy Flag Officer's Flags 1948 Regulations
Fleet Admiral Flag (still in use in 1948) but no further promotions were authorized.	Admiral's Flag 1948 Navy Regulations	Vice Admiral's Flag 1948 Navy Regulations	Rear Admiral's Flag 1948 Navy Regulations	Rear Admiral (Lower Half) Flag 1948 Navy Regulations
	Admiral's Flag Restricted Line Officer / Staff Officer 1948 Navy Regulations	Vice Admiral's Flag Restricted Line Officer / Staff Officer 1948 Navy Regulations	Rear Admiral's Flag 1948 Restricted Line Officer / Staff Officer Navy Regulations	Rear Admiral (Lower Half) Flag Restricted Line Officer / Staff Officer 1948 Navy Regulations

== 5-Star officer flags ==
Near the end of World War II, the Army and the Navy created five-star General of the Army and Fleet Admiral ranks. This was mainly to keep the American commanders from being "outranked" by British Field Marshalls and Admirals of the Fleet. The rank was authorized by Congress in 1944 and made "permanent" in 1946. General Henry H. Arnold was made General of the Air Force in 1947 having already been a General of the Army since 1944. The flags are no longer in use since the death of General Omar Bradley in 1981.

5-Star Flag Officer Flags
General of the Army Flag 1944	Admiral of the Fleet Flag 1944	General of the Air Force Flag 1947

== First Coast Guard admiral flags ==
At about the same time, the US Coast Guard was also developing new flags for their Admirals. The USCG had expanded greatly during World War II and was in the post-war was allowed a full admiral for its commandant. Before the war, there are no reliable records as to whether the few Rear Admirals the USCG had were allowed flag officer flags or not. In 1945, the Coast Guard took the flags of the US Navy's admirals and added a white version of their official seal over crossed anchors.

US Coast Guard Flag Officer's Flags 1945
US Coast Guard Commandant's Flag 1945	US Coast Guard Vice Commandant's Flag 1945	US Coast Guard Rear Admiral's Flag 1945	US Coast Guard Rear Admiral (Lower Half) Flag 1945

== Air Force general officer flags ==
In 1947, the US Air Force changed from the flags of the Army Air Force to the white on blue flags that they still use today and the first officer to get one was Harry "Hap" Arnold who was the General of the Air Force a five-star general.

US Air Force General Officer Flags 1947
Air Force General of the Air Force Flag 1947	Air Force General Flag 1947	Air Force Lieutenant General Flag 1947	Air Force Major General Flag 1947	Air Force Brigadier General Flag 1947

== National Guard Bureau ==
In 1975, the National Guard Bureau gave its Chief (a major general at the time) a positional color flag. It would not contain any stars like most flag officer's flags. The colors dark blue and ultramarine blue are to represent the Army and the Air Force, which make up the Guard. The two gold arrowheads are "flight devices" representing the Air Guard. In 1998, the Bureau added the two scrolls. In 2008, the Guard would get the final version of the Chief's flag with four stars added and the flight devices removed. In 2012, the Vice Chief would get a three star version of the flag that resembled the Deputy Chief of Staff of the Army's pattern and in 2024, that flag would get its fourth star.

National Guard Chief and Vice Chief Flags 1975-present
Flag of the Chief of the National Guard Bureau 1975–1998	Flag of the Chief of the National Guard Bureau 1998–2008	Flag of the Chief of the National Guard Bureau 2008–present	Flag of the Vice Chief of the National Guard Bureau 2012–2024	Flag of the Vice Chief of the National Guard Bureau 2024–present

== Modern Coast Guard admiral flags ==
In 1979, the US Coast Guard created a flag for the Commandant and the Vice Commandant that were similar to the Chief of Naval Operations and Vice Chief of Naval Operations. In 1985, both the Navy and the USCG changed Rear Admiral Lower Half to one star to match the O-7 Brigadier General ranks of the other services. In 2016, the USCG made the first Vice Commandant full admiral and thus a four-star Vice Commandant flag.

US Coast Guard Flag Officer's Flags 1979-present
USCG Commandant's Flag 1979	USCG Vice Commandant's Flag 1979	US Coast Guard Admiral's Flag 1985	US Coast Guard Vice Admiral's Flag 1985	US Coast Guard Rear Admiral's Flag 1985	US Coast Guard Rear Admiral Lower Half's Flag 1985

The term "flag officer" is still in use today, explicitly defined as an officer of the U.S. Navy or Coast Guard serving in or having the grade of admiral, vice admiral, rear admiral, or rear admiral (lower half), equivalent to general officers of an army.

In the United States Army, Air Force, and Marine Corps, the term "flag officer" generally is applied to all general officers authorized to fly their own command flags—i.e., brigadier general, or pay grade O-7, and above. As a matter of law, Title 10 of the United States Code makes a distinction between general officers and flag officers (general officer for the Army, Marine Corps, and Air Force; flag officer for the Navy and Coast Guard). Non-naval officers usually fly their flags from their headquarters, vessels, or vehicles, typically for only the most senior officer present.

In the United States, all flag and general officers must be nominated by the President and confirmed by the Senate. Each subsequent promotion requires renomination and re-approval. For the Navy, each flag officer assignment is usually limited to a maximum of two years, followed by either reassignment, reassignment and promotion, or retirement.

== Service chief flag officers ==
The chiefs of the various US military services have their own flags. The US Army was the first to develop a special flag for the Chief of Staff of the US Army in 1917. The Navy created a flag for the Chief of Naval Operations in 1964. The Air Force redesigned their Chief of Staff's flag in 1977. The Coast Guard Commandant received a new design (similar to the CNO) in 1979. And the Space Force Chief of Space Operations got a flag quickly in 2020.

Flags of the Service Chief Flag Officers of the United States
Flag of the Chief of Staff US Army 1917	Flag of the Chief of Naval Operations 1964	Flag of the Chief of Staff of the US Air Force 1977	Flag of the Commandant of the US Coast Guard 1979	Flag of the Chief of Space Operations 2020

The Flag of the Chief of Staff of the US Army began when Major General Hugh L. Scott was the CSA, as he and his immediate successor were 2-star generals, the flag has two stars. The flag would not get a third star until 1923 under Lt. Gen. John J. Pershing. The final design would happen under Gen. Charles Summerall in 1927.

Historical Flags of the Chief of Staff of the United States Army
Flag of the Chief of Staff US Army 1917–1922	Flag of the Chief of Staff US Army 1923–1927	Flag of the Chief of Staff US Army 1927–present

Beginning in 1949 with the US Army, their deputies (or vice chiefs) began to also get a distinctive flag of office. In 2015, the USCG had its first full admiral Vice Commandant.

Flags of the Vice Service Chief Flag Officers of the United States
Flag of the Vice Chief of Staff US Army 1949	Flag of the Vice Chief of Naval Operations 1970	Flag of the Vice Chief of Staff of the US Air Force 1977	Flag of the Vice Commandant of the US Coast Guard 2015	Flag of the Vice Chief of Space Operations 2020

The first Chairman of the Joint Chiefs of Staff, General Omar Bradley, had a special flag created for the CJCS in 1950. The CJCS' deputy would get a flag in 1986.

Flags of the Joint Chiefs of Staff flag officers
Flag of the Chairman of the Joint Chiefs of Staff 1950	Flag of the Vice Chairman of the Joint Chiefs of Staff 1986

== United States Maritime Service ==
Since 1992, the Superintendent of the Merchant Marine Academy has been authorized a flag by the Treasury Department - a blue naval flag with the wreath and anchor symbol, in gold, in the upper left canton with two or three white stars horizontal across the bottom depending on if the superintendent is a rear or vice admiral.

United States Maritime Service Flag Officer Flags
Flag of the Superintendent of the Merchant Marine Academy (Vice Admiral)	Flag of the Superintendent of the Merchant Marine Academy (Rear Admiral)
