= Flag of the United States Navy =

United States Navy
- Use: Other
- Proportion: 16:13
- Adopted: 24 April 1959
- Design: Anchor, USS Constitution, Bald Eagle
- Infantry Battalion Flag
- Former, unofficial flag of the United States Navy
- Use: Other
- Proportion: 156:133
- Adopted: December 1864
- Design: Dark blue foul anchor on a white diamond, with a dark blue background

The flag of the United States Navy consists of the seal of the U.S. Department of the Navy in the center, above a yellow scroll inscribed "United States Navy" in dark blue letters, against a dark blue background.

The flag was officially authorized by President Dwight D. Eisenhower on 24 April 1959 and was formally introduced to the public on 30 April 1959 at a ceremony at Naval Support Facility Carderock in Maryland. It replaced the infantry battalion flag which had been used as the U.S. Navy's unofficial flag for many years beforehand.

It is used on land, displayed inside naval offices, in parades, and for other ceremonial occasions, and often on a staff at the quarterdeck of ships in port. It is not flown by ships at sea, nor on outdoor flagpoles on naval land installations, and is not used as an identifying mark of U.S. Navy ships and facilities, as the U.S. Coast Guard ensign is.

== Executive order ==
U.S. Navy flag as commonly manufactured and sold by private vendors, using unofficial proportions.

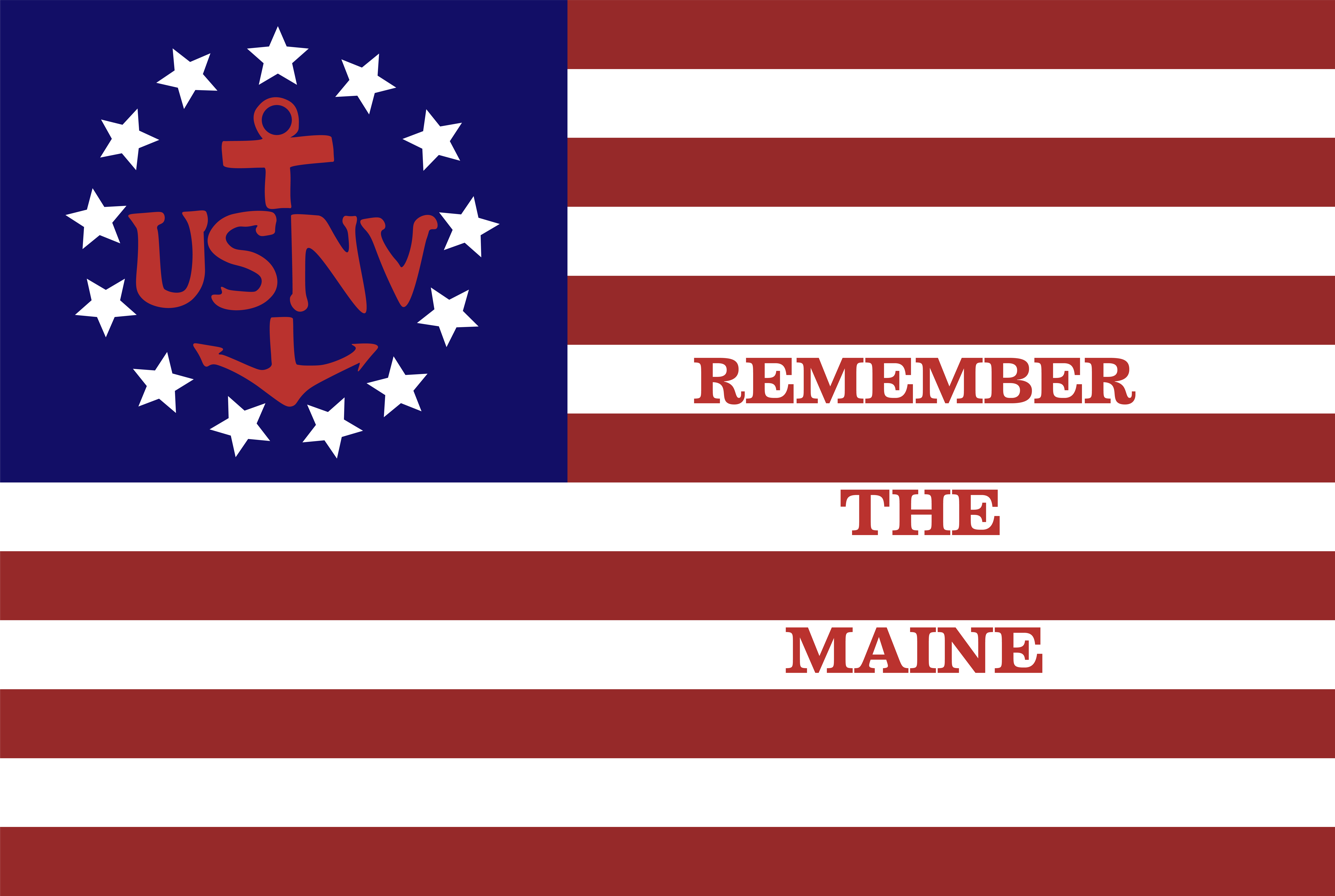
Unofficial Navy flag flown during the Spanish-American War

The following is details from the Naval Telecommunications Procedures, Flags, Pennants & Customs, NTP 13(B)

1710. FLAG OF THE UNITED STATES NAVY By Executive Order 10812 of 24 April 1959, the President, upon the recommendation of the Secretary of the Navy with the approval of the Secretary of Defense, established and prescribed an official flag for the United States Navy. This flag is to be 4 feet 4 inches hoist (width) by 5 feet 6 inches fly (length), of dark blue material, with yellow fringe, 2½ inches wide. In the center of the flag is a device 3 feet 1 inch overall, consisting of the inner pictorial portion of the seal of the Department of the Navy (with the exception that a continuation of the sea has been substituted for the land area), in its proper colors within a circular yellow rope edging, all 2 feet 6 inches in diameter above a yellow scroll inscribed "UNITED STATES NAVY" in dark blue letters.

1. The U.S. Navy flag shall be used to represent the Navy as follows:
  1. At official ceremonies
  2. In parades
  3. During official Navy display occasions
  4. At public gatherings when the Navy is an official participant
  5. On such occasions as may be specifically authorized by the Secretary of the Navy.
2. When used for the purposes listed above, the U.S. Navy flag will accompany, and take the place of honor next after the national ensign except when other branches of the armed forces are participating, in which case the service flags will take the precedence of the services which they represent, (see Article 1724 for the service precedences).
3. The U.S. Navy flag shall not be used for outdoor fixed (permanent) display purposes.
4. There are no cord and tassels authorized for use with the flag of the United States Navy.
5. Battle streamers displayed on the U.S. Navy flag represent both war and non-war actions involving combat. The silver and bronze star embroidered thereon signify selected actions and campaigns in which the Navy has been engaged. Presidential Unit Citation, Navy Unit Commendation and Meritorious Unit Commendation streamers bear numerals rather than stars, indicating the total number of each award earned. Streamers are long, narrow, swallow-tailed ribbons, 3 to 4 feet long, of the same design and width as the service ribbons or unit decoration, and are displayed attached to the staff below the ornament by a brass ring.
6. To determine eligibility and entitlement refer to SECNAVINST 1650.1 (current) (Navy and Marine Corps Award Manual) and SECNAVINST 10520.2 (current).
7. The U.S. Navy flag is for official Navy use only, and shall not be made available to civilian groups, organizations or individuals.

== Streamers ==
The following streamers are authorized, in order of precedence:

Streamers
Order	Name	Image	Device(s)
1	Presidential Unit Citation (Navy)		"red numerals"
2	Navy Unit Commendation		"red numerals"
3	Meritorious Unit Commendation (Navy)		"red numerals"
4	Revolutionary War		
5	Quasi-War with France		
6	the First Barbary War and the Second Barbary War		
7	War of 1812		
8	African Slave Trade		
9	Operations Against West Indian Pirates		
10	Indian Wars		
11	Mexican War		
12	Civil War		
13	Spanish Campaign		
14	Philippine Campaign		
15	China Relief Expedition		
16	World War I Victory		
17	World War II Victory		
18	Second Nicaraguan Campaign		
19	Yangtze Service		
20	China Service		
21	American Defense Service		
22	American Campaign		
23	Asiatic-Pacific Campaign x 2		
24	European-African-Middle Eastern Campaign		
25	Korean Service		
26	National Defense Service		
27	Armed Forces Expeditionary		
28	Vietnam Service		
29	Southwest Asia Service		
30	Kosovo Campaign		
31	Afghanistan Campaign		
32	Iraq Campaign		
33	Global War on Terrorism Expeditionary		
34	Global War on Terrorism Service		

- Note that a "x #" designation denotes the number of streamers used to carry devices (maximum of 6), not the number of awards. For streamers there the device column lists "red numerals", the total number of the award earned by ships and units of the Navy are totalled and embroidered in red. Because these numbers are constantly changing, they are not listed here.

== Navy jack ==
Jacks are additional national flags flown by warships (and certain other ships) on a jackstaff at the bow of the ship. These are usually flown only when not underway and when the ship is dressed on special occasions.

Union Jack, the current jack of the United States Navy

First Navy Jack, flown by all commissioned warships from September 11, 2002 to June 3, 2019

== See also ==
- Flags of the United States Armed Forces
