= Flag officer =

Senior military officer entitled to fly a flag of rank

A flag officer is a commissioned officer in a nation's armed forces senior enough to be entitled to fly a flag to mark the position from which that officer exercises command, such as their flagship.

The generic title of flag officer is used in many modern navies and coast guards to denote those who hold the rank of rear admiral or its equivalent and above, also called "flag ranks". In some navies, this also includes the rank of commodore. Flag officer corresponds to the generic terms general officer, used by land and some air forces to describe all grades of generals, and air officer, used by other air forces to describe all grades of air marshals and air commodores.

Some flag officers may be assigned a junior officer, called a flag lieutenant or flag adjutant, attached as a personal adjutant or aide-de-camp. Uniforms for officers in such roles are distinguished by a gold aiguillette, which lead to the common diminutive, "loop", and misconception that this junior officer was the flag officer, responsible for carrying the admirals flag.

Different countries use the term "flag officer" in different ways:

- In many countries, such as the United States, a flag officer is a senior officer of the navy, specifically one holding any of the admiral ranks; the term may or may not include the rank of commodore.
- In some countries, such as India and Bangladesh, the designation may apply in all armed forces, not just in the navy. This means generals can also be considered flag officers.
- In most Arab armies, liwa (Arabic: لواء), which can be translated as "flag officer", is a specific rank, equivalent to a major general. However, "ensign" is debatably a more exact literal translation of the word. In principle, a liwa commands several units called "flags" or "ensigns" (i.e. brigades, also called liwa).
- Russian navies refer to the approximate equivalent of a British Royal Navy flag officer as a flagman (флагман). Before the formation of the Soviet Navy in 1918, the Imperial Russian Navy also had officers with the function of a flag-ofitser (флаг-офицер), subordinate to a flagman and especially charged with adjutant duties and signals.

== Canada ==
In the Canadian Armed Forces, a flag officer (French: officier général, "general officer") is an admiral, vice admiral, rear admiral, or commodore, the naval equivalent of a general officer of the army or air force. It is a somewhat counterintuitive usage of the term, as only flag officers in command of commands or formations actually have their own flags (technically, a commodore has only a broad pennant, not a flag), and army and air force generals in command of commands or formations also have their own flags, but are not called flag officers. Base commanders, usually full colonels, have a pennant that flies from the mast or flagpole on the base, when resident, or on vehicles that carry them.

A flag officer's rank is denoted by a wide strip of gold braid on the cuff of the service dress tunic, one to four gold maple leaves over a crossed sword and baton, all beneath a royal crown, on epaulettes and shoulder boards; and two rows of gold oak leaves on the peak of the service cap. Since the unification of the Canadian Forces in 1968, a flag officer's dress tunic had a single broad stripe on the sleeve and epaulettes.

In May 2010, the naval uniform dark dress tunic was adjusted—exterior epaulettes were removed, reverting to the sleeve ring and executive curl-rank insignia used by most navies. commodores' uniforms display a broad stripe, and each succeeding rank receives an additional sleeve ring. There are no epaulettes on the exterior of the tunic, but they are still worn on the uniform shirt underneath.

== India ==
In the Indian Armed Forces, it is applied to brigadiers, major generals, lieutenant generals and generals in the Army; commodores, rear admirals, vice admirals and admirals in the Navy; and air commodores, air vice marshals, air marshals and air chief marshals in the Air Force. Each of these flag officers is designated with a specific flag. India's honorary ranks (five star ranks) are field marshal in the Army, Marshal of the Indian Air Force in the Air Force and admiral of the fleet in the Navy. A similar equivalence is applied to senior police officers of rank Deputy Inspector General (DIG), Inspector General (IG), Additional Director General (ADG) and Director General (DG).

== United Kingdom ==
In the United Kingdom, the term is used only in the Royal Navy and for the ranks of rear admiral and above. When in a command appointment, these officers are known as 'flag officers' and are entitled to fly a distinguishing flag. When not in a command appointment, they are known as 'officers of flag rank', although historically, all officers promoted to flag rank were considered to be flag officers. Commodores, although entitled to hoist a broad pennant when in a command appointment, are senior officers rather than flag officers.

Of the 39 officers of flag rank in the Royal Navy in 2006, very few were flag officers with entitlement to fly a flag. For example, a Commander-in-Chief Fleet flies an admiral's flag whether ashore or afloat and is a flag officer. The chief of staff (support), a rear admiral, is not entitled to fly a flag and is an officer of flag rank. List of fleets and major commands of the Royal Navy lists most admirals who were flag officers. A flag officer's junior officer is often known as "Flags".

The equivalent term in the other armed services is 'general officer' in the British Army and 'air officer' or 'officer of air rank' in the Royal Air Force, with the terms 'general officer commanding' and 'air officer commanding' used for those in command appointments. In the RAF, air commodores are considered officers of air rank, unlike their naval counterparts who are not officers of flag rank, or their army equivalent, brigadiers, who are not general officers.

== United States ==
Captain was the highest rank in the United States Navy from its beginning in 1775 until 1857. The early US republic felt that the title Admiral was "too royal" for a country without a king. By 1852, the Navy had the ranks of Captain, Senior Captain and Commander-in-Chief of a Squadron.

From at least the early 1800s, commodores flew broad pennants as a sign of their command, an early example of this was Commodore William Bainbridge who flew one from his command the USS President in 1808. These pennants were usually swallow-tailed and blue after the tradition of the British Royal Navy.

In 1857, Congress created the temporary rank of flag officer, which was bestowed on senior Navy captains who were assigned to lead a squadron of vessels in addition to command of their own ship. This temporary usage gave way to the permanent ranks of commodore and rear admiral in 1862. The 1857 regulations allowed for a solid color rectangular flag to indicate a flag officer - blue represented the senior flag officer, red for the next most senior if two or more were present and white the third most senior. Otherwise a flag officer flew a blue flag and this would continue for Commodores until 1865.

Arguably the most famous naval figure of the US Civil War, David Farragut, was one of the first Flag Officers and in 1862 after capturing New Orleans, Congress made him a Rear Admiral. After the Battle of Mobile Bay he was made a Vice Admiral and finally after the war ended a full Admiral.

In 1903, the War Department first authorized flags for US Army general officers. The first flags were "boat flags" for when army officers visited navy ships. By 1923, these flags were expanded so that they were also for use on automobiles and field or office flags. Line officers were to have a scarlet flag with one to four stars based on rank. General staff officers flags would be in the colors of their branch with one or two stars and their branch insignia.

The term "flag officer" is still in use today, explicitly defined as an officer of the U.S. Navy or Coast Guard serving in or having the grade of admiral, vice admiral, rear admiral, or rear admiral (lower half), equivalent to general officers of an army.

In the United States Army, Air Force, and Marine Corps, the term "flag officer" generally is applied to all general officers authorized to fly their own command flags—i.e., brigadier general, or pay grade O-7, and above. As a matter of law, Title 10 of the United States Code makes a distinction between general officers and flag officers (general officer for the Army, Marine Corps, and Air Force; flag officer for the Navy and Coast Guard). Non-naval officers usually fly their flags from their headquarters, vessels, or vehicles, typically for only the most senior officer present.

In the United States, all flag and general officers must be nominated by the President and confirmed by the Senate. Each subsequent promotion requires renomination and re-approval. For the Navy, each flag officer assignment is usually limited to a maximum of two years, followed by either reassignment, reassignment and promotion, or retirement.
