= Seal and emblem of the United States Department of the Army =

Seal and emblem of the US Department of the Army

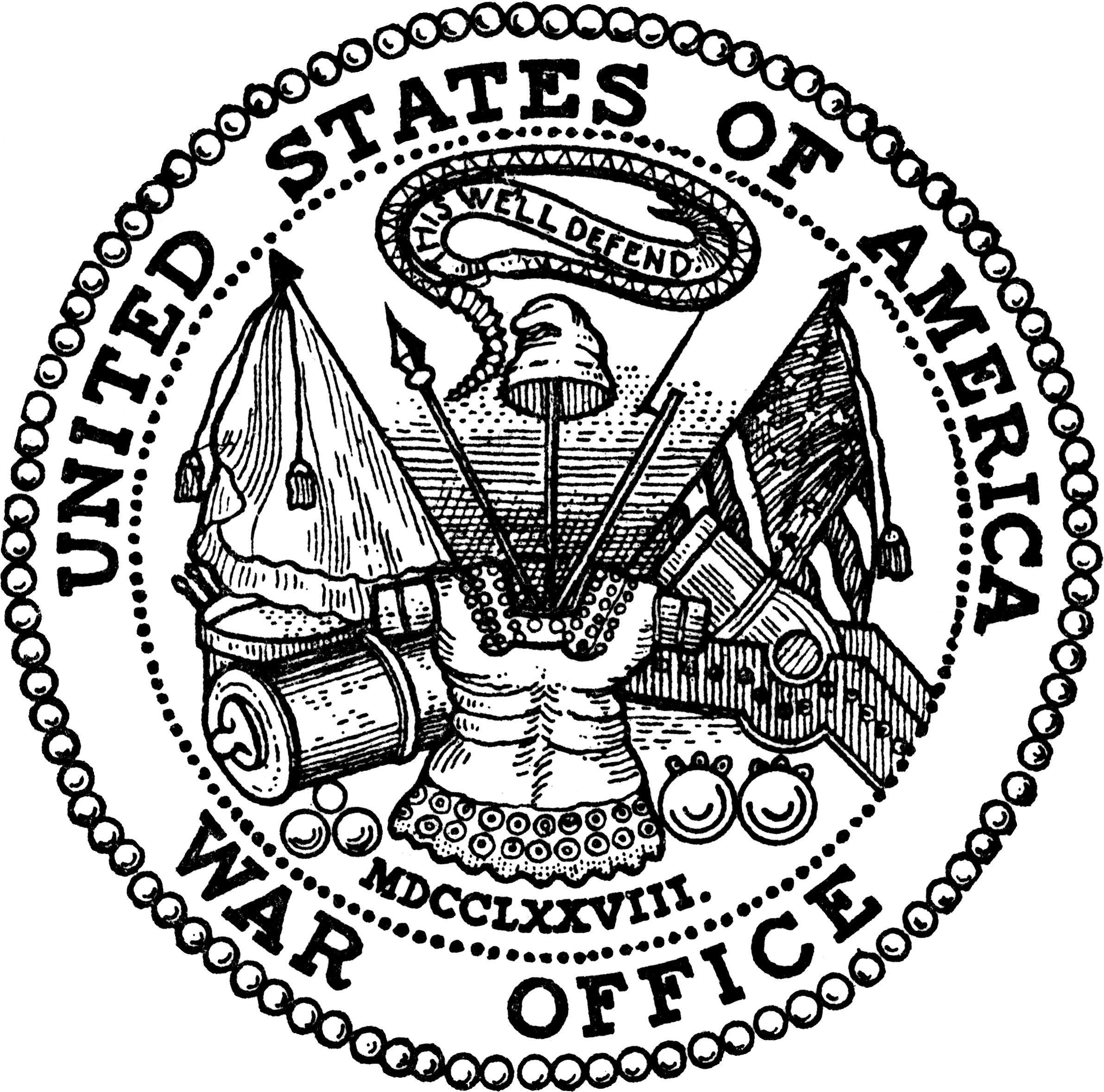
The Department of the Army Seal. It was formerly known as the "War Office Seal".

The Department of the Army Emblem

The seal of the U.S. Board of War and Ordnance.

"Military service mark" approved by the U.S. Department of Defense for usage by third parties to represent the U.S. Army in unofficial contexts.

The Department of the Army Seal and the Department of the Army Emblem are, respectively, the official seal and emblem of the United States Department of the Army (formerly, of the War Department). The "War Office Seal" was created in 1778 and the Emblem was developed out of the seal and approved in 1947.

== History ==
The Army Seal was first used in 1778, during the American Revolution, to authenticate documents. It displayed the designation "War Office", which was synonymous with Headquarters of the Army, and the Roman date MDCCLXXVIII (1778). It remained unchanged until 1947, when the War Office banner was replaced with "Department of the Army" and the date was changed to 1775, the year in which the Army was established. The changes were legislated by the National Security Act of 1947, and authorized by Section 3011, Title 10, United States Code. There was long no official display item to identify the Army. The Seal had traditionally been used to authenticate documents only and was not authorized for public display. Recognizing the need to provide a display item, the Secretary of the Army approved the emblem to represent the Army on January 29, 1974.

== Description ==
The Army Institute of Heraldry describes the War Office Seal as follows:

In the center is a Roman cuirass below a vertical unsheathed sword, point up, the pommel resting on the neck opening of the cuirass and a Phrygian cap supported on the sword point, all between on the left an espontoon and on the right a musket with fixed bayonet crossed in saltire behind the cuirass and passing under the sword guard. To the left of the cuirass and esponton is a national color of the Revolutionary War period with cords and tassels, on a flagstaff with spearhead, above a cannon barrel, the muzzle end slanting upward behind the cuirass, in front of the drum, with two drumsticks and the fly end of the flag draped over the drumhead; below, but partly in front of the cannon barrel, is a pile of three cannon balls. To the right of the cuirass and musket is a flag of unidentified designs with cords and tassels, on a flagstaff with spearhead, similarly arranged above a mortar on a carriage, the mortar facing inward and in front of the lower portion of the color and obscuring the lower part of it; below the mortar are two bomb shells placed side by side. Centered above the Phrygian cap is a rattlesnake holding in its mouth a scroll inscribed "This We'll Defend". Centered below the cuirass are the Roman numerals "MDCCLXXVIII".

Although the U.S. Department of the Army's emblem is derived from the Seal of the U.S. Department of the Army, it differs from the seal in several respects:

- The emblem is displayed in color while the seal is not.
- The emblem includes the inscription "Department of the Army" instead of the seal inscription "War Office"-
- On the emblem, the U.S. flag is on its own right (observer's left) to reflect the current custom for display of flags. The flag of the United States Army pattern has been added in place of the opposing flag displayed on the seal.
- The Roman numerals "MDCCLXXVIII" which indicate the date the Seal was adopted, were replaced with the date "1775" to reflect the date the Continental Army was established.

== Symbolism ==
The central element of the seal and emblem, the Roman cuirass, is a symbol of strength and defense. The sword, esponton (a type of half-pike formerly used by subordinate officers), musket, bayonet, cannon, cannonballs, mortar, and mortar bombs are representative of Army implements. The drum and drumsticks are symbols of public notification of the Army's purpose and intent to serve the Nation and its people. The Phrygian cap (often called the "Cap of Liberty") supported on the point of an unsheathed sword and the motto "This We'll Defend" on a scroll held by the rattlesnake is a symbol depicted on some American colonial flags and signifies the Army's constant readiness to defend and preserve the United States. The symbolism for the elements of the emblem is the same as for the seal with the deviations and additions noted under "Description" above: The colors of the design elements are those traditionally associated with the ideals of the United States and of the U.S. Army. The flags are depicted in their approved colors. Blue is symbolic of loyalty, vigilance, perseverance, and truth. Red denotes courage, zeal, and fortitude. White alludes to deeds worthy of remembrance. Black is indicative of determination and constancy. Gold represents achievement, dignity, and honor.

== Current usage ==
This "War Office Seal" is still used when legal certification is necessary to authenticate as "official" documents and records of the Department of the Army.

Reproduction of the emblem is authorized in publications and other printed matter of an official or quasi-official nature in U.S. Army approved films and in official U.S. Army motion pictures or television programs. The design may not be modified in any manner. It may be reproduced in its proper colors, through the use of a one-color line process, or as a line drawing. The use of the emblem for any other purposes, including its incorporation in other items for commercial sale, will be only as authorized by the Institute of Heraldry.
