= Fort Mercer Flag =

Early U.S. flag design

- Use: Historical
- Design: Thirteen alternating blue and white stripes, a red canton with thirteen stars
- Designed by: Unknown

The Fort Mercer Flag is a variant of the American flag flown at Fort Mercer around 1777 during the American Revolution. This unique flag had inverted colors similar to that of the Serapis flag. Some replicas of the flag usually contain inverted stars and a wider ratio.

== See also ==
- History of the flags of the United States
- Flags of the United States Armed Forces
