= Church pennant =

Navy flag indicating that a religious service is taking place on board

A church pennant is a pennant flown to indicate that a religious service is in progress. It is flown on ships and establishments (bases).

== Marine Nationale ==
The French Navy maintained a church pennant but it fell into disuse in 1905.

== Royal Navy and Royal Netherlands Navy ==
Church Pennant

The Church Pennant as used by the Royal Navy, other navies of the Commonwealth, and the Royal Netherlands Navy.

=== History ===
The broad pennant combination of the English Flag at the hoist and the Dutch National Flag in the fly originates from the Anglo-Dutch wars of the late 17th century, when it was used on Sundays to indicate that a service was in progress and a ceasefire existed between the warring nations.

== United States Navy ==

U.S. Navy church pennant (top), and Jewish worship pennant (bottom)

The United States Navy maintains several church pennants, of which the appropriate one is flown immediately above the ensign wherever the ensign is displayed, at the gaff when under way, or at the flagstaff when not under way, when religious services are held aboard ship by a Navy chaplain. Originally, the only authorized church pennant was for Christian chaplains, regardless of specific denomination. Later in 1975, the Secretary of Navy approved a similar Jewish worship pennant. On September 11th 2022, a Buddhist pennant was flown on an underway Navy ship for the first time.

== See also ==
- United States military chaplain symbols
