= Flag of the United States Coast Guard =

United States Coast Guard
- Use: Other
- Proportion: 5:4
- Adopted: January 28, 1964
- Design: A white field with a dark blue U.S. Great Seal. The shield on the eagle's breast has a blue chief over vertical red and white stripes. Inscribed in an arc above the eagle is "UNITED STATES COAST GUARD"; below the eagle is "SEMPER PARATUS" and beneath that are the Arabic numerals "1790".
- Designed by: United States Coast Guard

The flag of the United States Coast Guard is white with a dark blue Great Seal of the United States; the shield on the eagle's breast has a blue chief over vertical red and white stripes. Inscribed in an arc above the eagle is "UNITED STATES COAST GUARD"; below the eagle is the Coast Guard motto, "SEMPER PARATUS" ("Always Ready") and beneath that in Arabic numerals is "1790" (the year in which the service's ancestor, the U.S. Revenue Cutter Service, was founded). All inscriptions on the flag are in dark blue typeface.

== History ==
The origins of the Coast Guard standard are very obscure. One theory states that it might have evolved from an early jack. There is at least one contemporary painting supporting this theory. In an 1840 painting, the Revenue cutter Alexander Hamilton flies a flag very similar to that of today's Coast Guard as a jack. This flag, like the union jack, appears to be the canton or upper corner of the Revenue cutter ensign.

An illustration in 1917 shows the Coast Guard standard as a white flag with a blue eagle and 13 stars in a semicircle surrounding it. Later, the words, "United States Coast Guard-- Semper Paratus" were added.

After 1950, the semicircle of stars was changed to the circle containing 13 stars. The Coast Guard standard is used during parades and ceremonies and is adorned by the Coast Guard's 34 battle streamers. The Coast Guard is unique to the other services for it has two official flags, the Coast Guard standard and the Coast Guard ensign.

The current flag was officially adopted on January 28, 1964.

== Coast Guard ensign ==
The U.S. Coast Guard's ensign, flown from its ships.

The Coast Guard ensign was first flown by the Revenue Cutter Service in 1799 to distinguish revenue cutters from merchant ships. The order stated the Ensign would be "16 perpendicular stripes, alternate red and white, the union of the ensign to be the arms of the United States in a dark blue on a white field." The number of stripes was chosen because there were 16 states in the United States at the time.

The purpose of the flag is to allow ship captains to easily recognize those vessels having legal authority to stop and board them. This flag is flown only as a symbol of law enforcement authority and is never carried as a parade standard.

== See also ==
- Flags of the United States Armed Forces
- Ensign of the United States
