= Guidon (United States) =

Military standard or flag

19th century guidon used by the 7th Cavalry Regiment

In the United States Armed Forces, a guidon is a military standard or flag that company/battery/troop or platoon-sized detachments carry to signify their unit designation and branch/corps affiliation or the title of the individual who carries it. A basic guidon can be rectangular, but sometimes has a triangular portion removed from the fly (known as "swallow-tailed").

== Significance ==
The significance and importance of the guidon is that it represents the unit and its commanding officer. When the commander is in service, his or her guidon is displayed for everyone to see. When the commander leaves for the day, the guidon is taken down. It is an honor to be the guidon carrier for a unit, known as a "guidon bearer" or "guide". He or she stands in front of the unit alongside the commander (or the commander's representative), and is the rallying point for troops to fall into formation when the order is given. In drill and ceremonies, the guidon bearers and commander are always in front of the formation.

The guidon is a great source of pride for the unit, and several military traditions have developed around it, stemming back from ancient times. Any sort of disgrace toward the guidon is considered a dishonor of the unit as a whole, and punishment is typical. For example, should the guidon bearer drop the guidon, they must fall with it and perform punishment, often in the form of push-ups. Other units may attempt to steal the guidon to demoralize or antagonize the unit. Veteran soldiers know not to give up the guidon to anyone outside their unit, but new recruits may be tempted into relinquishing it by a superior, especially during a unit run.

== By branch ==
=== Army ===
As described in Chapter 6 of Army Regulation 840-10, guidons are swallow-tailed marker flags in branch-of-service colors, measuring 20 inches (51 cm) at the hoist by 27 inches (69 cm) at the fly, with the swallow-tail end forked 10 inches (25 cm). Previously guidons were made of wool bunting, and if serviceable these older versions may still be used. Current guidons are made of heavyweight rayon banner cloth. Old guidons show letters and numerals reversed as if printed through on the reverse of the guidon. Current guidons are made so that letters and numerals read correctly on both sides.

In general, the following Army units are entitled to guidons: lettered companies, troops, and batteries of regiments and separate battalions; separate numbered TO&E companies; and headquarters elements of groups, brigades, divisions, corps, commands, schools, and similar organizations.

Lettered companies (troops and batteries in the cavalry and field artillery respectively) of battalions (squadrons in the cavalry) have guidons displaying the branch insignia, the company letter, and the battalion and regimental numbers. The base color of the guidon is the first named color of the applicable branch, e.g. scarlet for field artillery, with the letters, numerals and insignia applied in the second named color of the branch, e.g. yellow for field artillery. For companies of separate battalions, the branch insignia is centered on the guidon between the battalion number above and the company letter below. For companies of battalions of regiments, the number above the insignia is that of the regiment; the number of the battalion is vertically centered between the insignia and the hoist. Groups use diagonal stripes of the branch's secondary color.

Separate numbered TO&E companies have guidons with their numerical designation under the branch insignia, e.g. the guidon of the 380th Quartermaster Company is buff with the insignia of the Quartermaster Corps over the numerals "380" in ultramarine blue, these being the named colors of the branch. Headquarters companies of groups, brigades, divisions and corps have guidons of a design corresponding to that of their Organizational Flag, e.g. the guidon of a headquarters battery of a Field Artillery Brigade or Fires Brigade would be vertically divided, scarlet and yellow, with the brigade's shoulder sleeve insignia centered.

Headquarters elements of Army commands, agencies, garrisons, centers, schools, depots and miscellaneous organizations are authorized guidons of distinctive design and colors. Generally these guidons follow the design of the unit's Organizational Flag. Various units not oriented to a specific branch, e.g. US Army Garrisons, have a teal blue guidon with the branch immaterial insignia (the coat of arms of the U.S. within a ring) in yellow.

Exceptions to the use of branch colors for guidons are found in the infantry and cavalry. The infantry branch colors are light blue and white, but infantry guidons have a field of Old Glory blue (the same shade of blue as used for the canton of the US national flag). The cavalry branch colors are yellow and dark blue. Cavalry guidons, however, are horizontally divided, scarlet over white, with troop letters and squadron/regimental numbers in white and scarlet, but no branch insignia.

There are two types of guidons used by the Corps of Cadets at the United States Military Academy. "Dress" guidons are horizontally divided, golden yellow over silver gray, with the letters "USCC" centered between the regimental number on the upper stripe and the company letter on the lower stripe. "Field" guidons have the regimental number only. All letters and numerals are black. Initial entry training platoons carry colored guidons to signify what phase of training they have attained. The guidon bearer normally stands with the platoon guide when stationary and marches at the head of the column. Although IET guidons may have streamers attached, they are typically undecorated.

Any unit citation, war service or campaign streamer may be attached to guidons. Guidon-bearing elements of US Army Regimental System units are entitled to display all streamers awarded to the regiment, with those earned by its own higher echelon (battalion or squadron) denoted by the addition of the Earned Honor Device, an embroidered laurel wreath, at the fly. Streamers for guidons are 1 3/8 by 24 inches (3.5 cm × 61.0 cm).

In recent years, the ongoing reorganization of the Army has led to the creation of new types of units, e.g. Sustainment Brigades and Fires Brigades, but generally their flags and guidons are of the pattern described above.

==== Component guidon chart ====
Colors, insignia, and devices for guidons
Unit	Background color & Text color	Insignia	Example
Adjutant General's Corps units	Dark Blue; White		
Artillery Branch; Air Defense Artillery units	Scarlet; Yellow		
Artillery Branch; Field Artillery units	Scarlet; Yellow		
Armor Branch	Yellow; Green		
Aviation Branch	Ultramarine Blue; Golden Orange		
Branch Immaterial	Teal Blue; Yellow		
Cavalry Branch	Red above White; White & Red	*Not used on guidon	
Chaplain Branch	Black; White	Regimental Shield	
Chemical Corps	Cobalt Blue; Golden Yellow		
Civil Affairs Corps	Purple; White		
Engineers Corps	Scarlet; White		
Finance Corps	Silver Grey; Golden Yellow		
Infantry Branch (United States)	Dark Blue; White		
Judge Advocate General's Corps	Dark Blue; White		
Ordnance Corps; Maintenance units	Crimson; Light Blue	None, Insignia used on Separate unit guidons	
Ordnance Corps non-Maintenance units	Crimson; Yellow		
Medical Department	Maroon; White		
Medical Department; Veterinary Units	Maroon; Green		
Military Intelligence Corps	Oriental Blue; Silver Grey		
Military Police Corps	Green; Yellow		
Psychological Operations Corps	Dark Green; Silver Grey		
Public Affairs Corps	Teal Blue; Yellow		
Quartermaster Corps; General units	Buff; Ultramarine Blue		
Quartermaster Corps; Supply units	Buff; Ultramarine Blue	None, Insignia used on Separate unit guidons	
Quartermaster Corps; Supply & Service units	Buff; Yellow	None, Insignia used on Separate unit guidons	
Quartermaster Corps; Supply and Transportation Units	Buff; Brick Red	None, Insignia used on Separate unit guidons	
Quartermaster Corps; Support Units	Buff; Scarlet	None, Insignia used on Separate unit guidons	
Signal Corps	Orange; White		
Special Forces Corps	Jungle Green; Silver Grey		
Transportation Corps	Brick Red; Golden Yellow		

=== Marine Corps ===
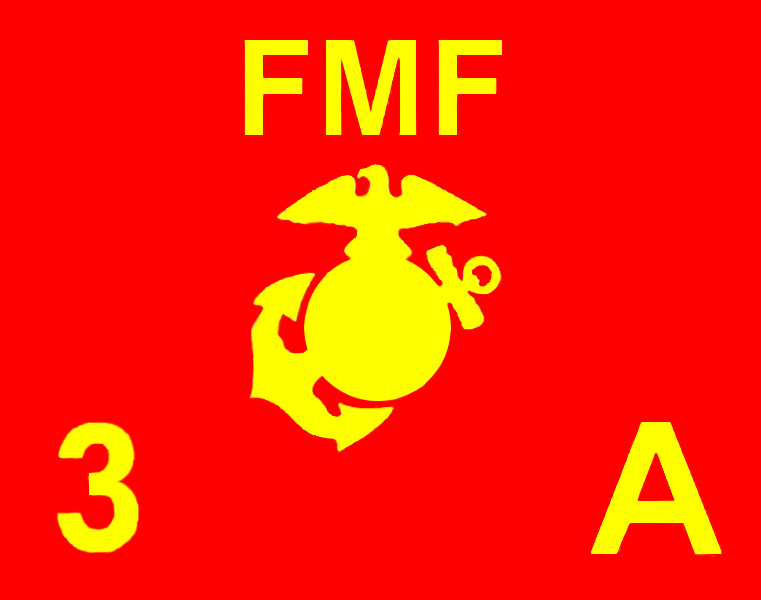
Guidon for Alpha company, 1st Battalion, 3rd Marines

A Marine guidon is always rectangular, 22 by 28 inches (56 cm × 71 cm), with a scarlet field and gold lettering, and an Eagle, Globe, and Anchor centered.

Recruit training units do not have any branch of service indication on their guidons; boot camp platoon guidons only display the platoon number (such as "3081") During the first phase of training (i.e., before initial drill), the guidon has a red platoon number against a yellow/gold background. During the second and third phases of training, the guidon's foreground and background colorations are exchanged, yielding a yellow/gold platoon number against a scarlet background.

Fleet Marine Forces units have "FMF" emblazoned above the Marine Emblem, non infantry and artillery reserve units display "USMCR," while all infantry, artillery, and active units carry a "USMC". The regimental-level numeral will be displayed in the lower left corner, unless a higher or lower command numeral provides better identification (for example, a battalion HQ company would display the battalion's numeral instead of the regiment). The company level designation letter, abbreviated title, or number will be in the lower right corner.

Charlie Company 1st Battalion 7th Marines "Suicide Charley" is one of the only units authorized a second guidon in the United States Marine Corps. Charlie Company 1/7 a.k.a. "Suicide Charley" is authorized a white guidon with a skull and crossbones. Fox Company 2nd Battalion 5th Marines "Blackhearts" are authorized white markings on a black guidon, Crossed rifle and shattered paddle and a Ka-Bar inset behind a black heart logo; skull wearing camouflage "Boonie Cover" superimposed at center above "Blackhearts."

No additional attachments are authorized, including streamers, bands, or the like. Some units incorporate additional mascots into unofficial guidons.

=== Navy ===
Guidon for 2nd Company, USS Missouri

Navy ships and squadrons may display a unit guidon while parading ashore. It measures 20 1/8 by 27 3/4 inches (51 cm × 70 cm) with a 10 inches (25 cm) swallowtail, is blue with white text, and depicts a fouled anchor within a diamond (identical to the insignia of the Naval Infantry Flag). Prior to World War II, a red flag was used for naval artillery units. Companies of the Brigade of Midshipmen attending the United States Naval Academy carry a gold guidon with blue numerals. Officer Candidate School Companies carry blue guidons with white lettering and a white bulldog.

=== Air Force ===
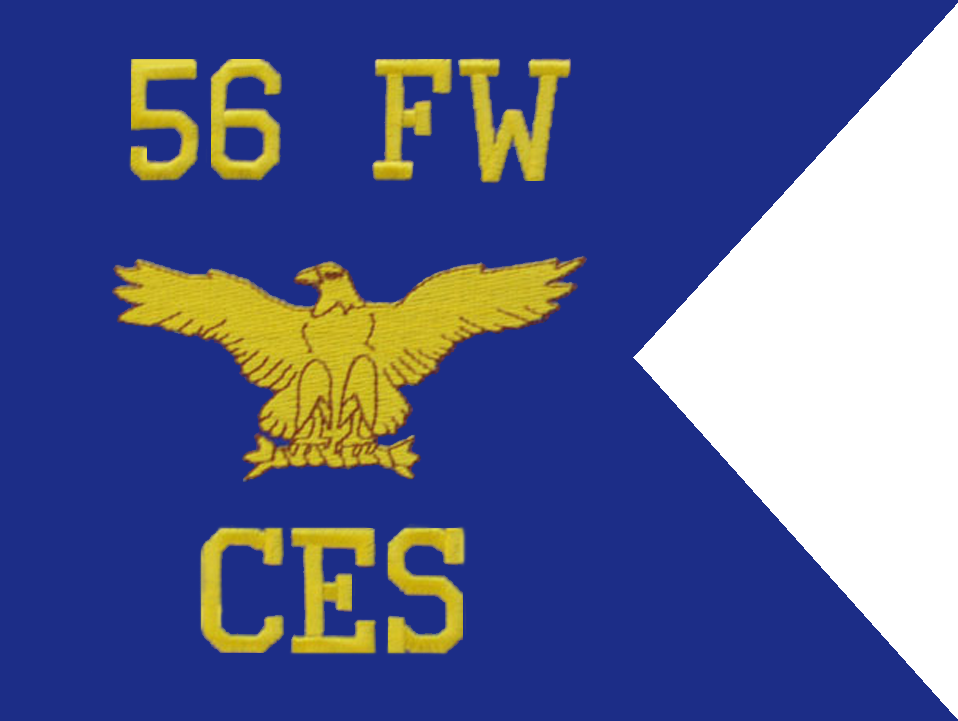
Guidon of the 56th Civil Engineering Squadron of the 56th Fighter Wing

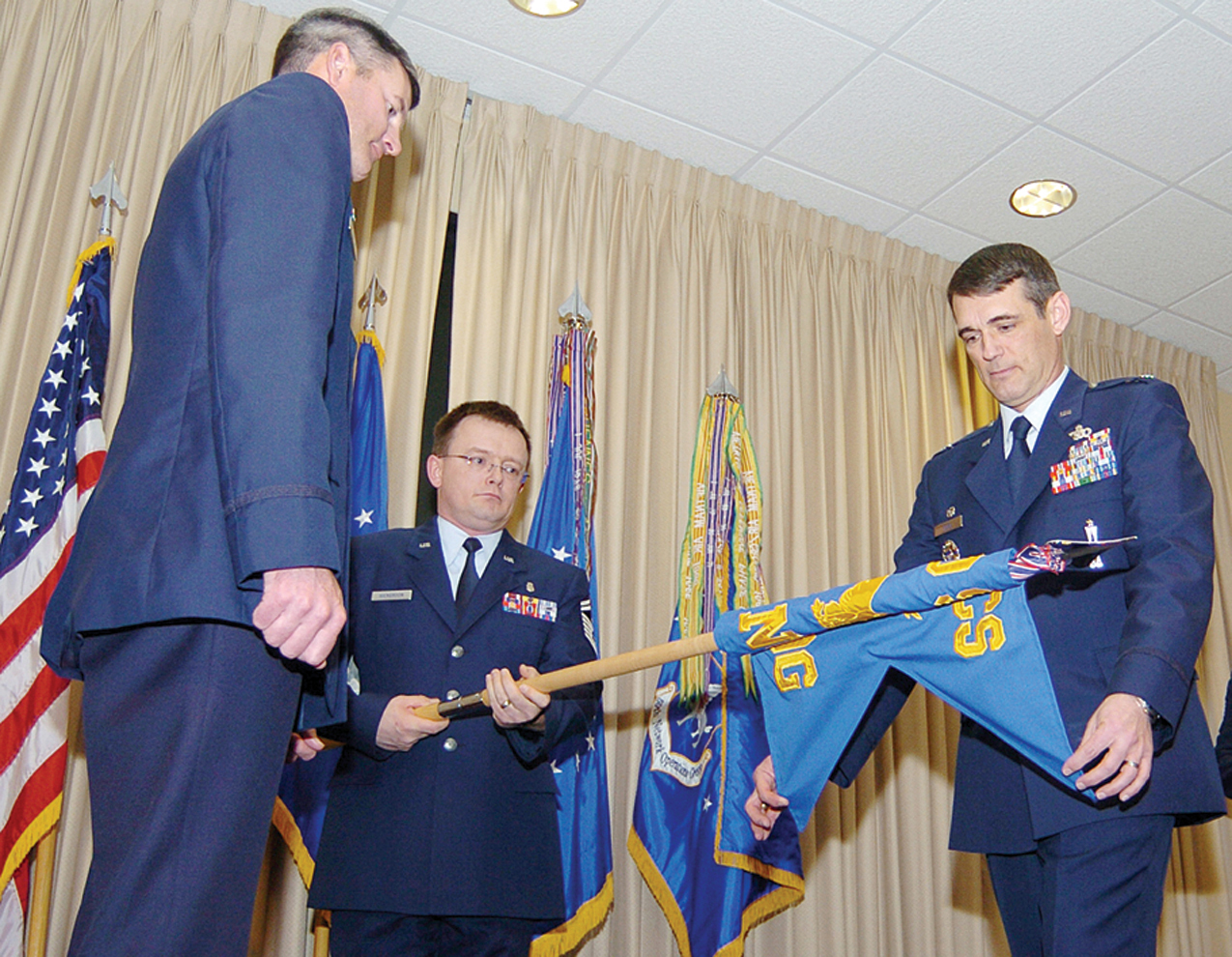
Air Force personnel case a squadron guidon as part of an inactivation ceremony.

In the Air Force, guidons are ultramarine blue wool and gold in nylon or polyester bunting, 20 by 27 inches (51 cm × 69 cm) to end of the swallowtail, and forked 10 inches (25 cm). An Air Force yellow American Eagle design appears on the front of the guidon and on the reverse side as if printed through. Above the design is the designation of the parent unit; below it is the designation of the squadron. When the number of the squadron and the parent organization are the same, the lower line indicates only the alphabetical portion of the squadron designation. Numerals and lettering are yellow, from 1 3/4 by 3 1/2 inches (4.4 cm × 8.9 cm) tall, and in varying widths. Lettering and numerals appear on both sides of the guidon, reading from left to right on both sides.

Campaign and service streamers earned by a unit are displayed on that unit's flag or guidon.

=== Space Force ===
Space Delta 1	Space Delta 2	Space Delta 3	Space Delta 4	Space Delta 5	Space Delta 6	Space Delta 7	Space Delta 8
Space Delta 9	Space Delta 10	Space Delta 11	Space Delta 12	Space Delta 13	Space Launch Delta 30	Space Launch Delta 45	

== See also ==
- Colours, standards and guidons
- Flags of the United States armed forces
- Fanion
