= Flag of the United States Air Force =

United States Air Force
- Other names: Ceremonial Departmental Flag, United States Air Force Departmental Flag, HQ USAF flag
- Use: Other
- Proportion: 33:26
- Adopted: 26 March 1951
- Design: The U.S. Air Force's crest surrounded by thirteen white five-pointed stars on a blue field.
- Designed by: Dorothy G. Gatchell
- Use: Other
- Proportion: 4:3
- Adopted: March 1951
- Design: The U.S. Air Force's crest surrounded by thirteen white five-pointed stars on a blue field.
- Designed by: Dorothy G. Gatchell

The flag of the United States Air Force was introduced in 1951 and consists of the U.S. Air Force's crest and shield, which itself comprises 13 white stars and the Department of the Air Force's coat of arms on a field of blue. The 13 stars represent the 13 original British American colonies, the three star grouping at the top portray the three Departments of the Department of Defense (Army, Navy, and Air Force). The crest includes the North American bald eagle (the national bird of the US), the cloud formation depicts the creation of a new firmament, and the wreath, composed of six alternate folds of silver and blue, incorporates the colors of the basic shield design.

== History ==
The flag was officially adopted by President Harry S. Truman on 26 March 1951. Elements of the flag's design are used on the Department of the Air Force seal as well as the U.S. Air Force's service mark. Dorothy G. Gatchell designed the flag itself, whereas the crest and shield that are featured on it were designed by Arthur E. Dubois. The flag's design has remained unchanged since its adoption in 1951.

== Design ==
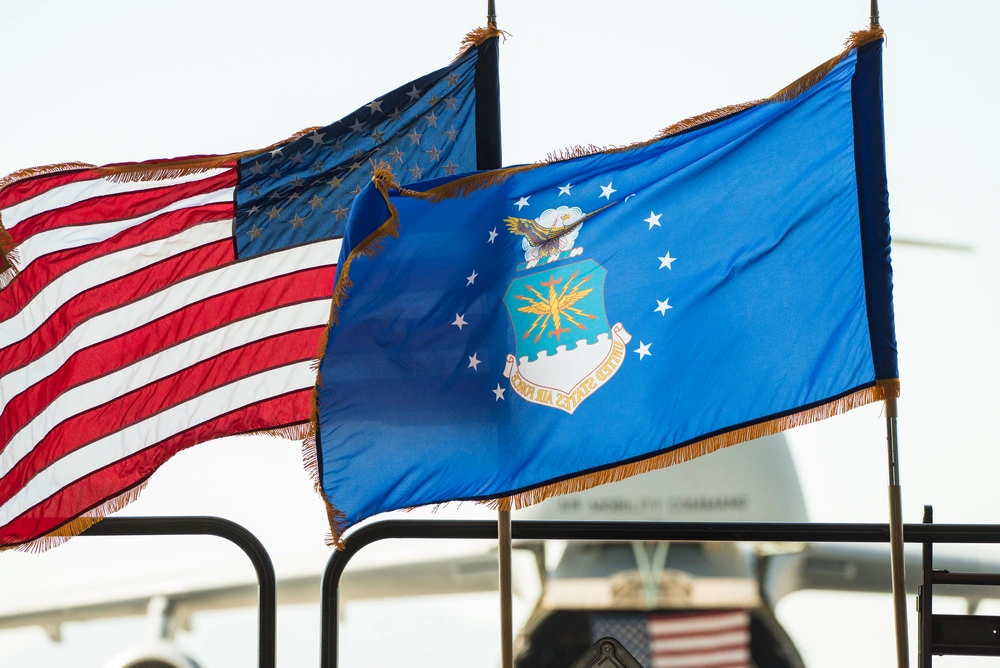
The flag flying alongside the flag of the United States at Travis Air Force Base, 2017.

There are two differently-sized variants of the flag that are used officially. A large one with an aspect ratio of 33:26, which also serves as the flag of the U.S. Air Force's headquarters element, and a smaller-sized variant with an aspect ratio of 4:3. The larger variant, known officially as the "Ceremonial Departmental Flag" and also referred to as being "Ceremonial"-sized, can be adorned with a 2-inch-wide fringe and campaign streamers, whereas the smaller variant may not be adorned with campaign streamers.

The flag itself consists of the "crest and shield" of the U.S. Air Force, defacing a field of blue. The exact shade of blue that is used for the field is Ultramarine Blue on the Pantone Matching System color scale.

== Streamers ==
Verified combat credit entitles an organization to the appropriate campaign streamers representing the named campaign in which it participated. The campaign streamer will be embroidered with the name and years of the campaign. Non-combat service is represented by an organizational service streamer, which is not embroidered.

=== Mexican Revolution ===
Mexican Service		
Campaign name embroidered on streamer	Date embroidered on streamer	Inclusive dates
Mexico	1916–1917	1916–1917

=== World War I ===
World War I Victory		
Campaign name embroidered on streamer	Date embroidered on streamer	Inclusive dates
Somme Defensive	1918	21 March 1918 – 6 April 1918
Lys	1918	9 April 1918 – 27 April 1918
Champagne-Marne	1918	15 July 1918 – 18 July 1918
Aisne-Marne	1918	18 July 1918 – 6 August 1918
Somme Offensive	1918	8 August 1918 – 11 November 1918
Oisne-Aisne	1918	19 August 1918 – 11 November 1918
St. Mihiel	1918	12 September 1918 – 16 September 1918
Meuse-Argonne	1918	26 September 1918 – 11 November 1918
Alsace (Note: Campaign considered a "Defensive Sector," so there are no dates embroidered on the streamer.)
Champagne
Flanders
Ile-de-France
Lorraine
Picardy
Theater of Operations	Non-combat credit	6 April 1917 – 11 November 1918

=== World War II ===
==== American Theater ====
American Campaign		
Campaign name embroidered on streamer	Date embroidered on streamer	Inclusive dates
Antisubmarine	1941–1945	7 December 1941 – 2 September 1945
American Theater	Non-combat credit	7 December 1941 – 2 March 1946

==== European African Middle Eastern Theater ====
European-African-Middle Eastern Campaign		
Campaign name embroidered on streamer	Date embroidered on streamer	Inclusive dates
Air Combat	1941–1945	7 December 1941 – 2 September 1945
Antisubmarine	1941–1945	7 December 1941 – 2 September 1945
Egypt-Libya	1942–1943	11 June 1942 – 12 February 1943
Algeria-French Morocco	1942	8 November 1942 – 11 November 1942
Tunisia	1942–1943	12 November 1942 – 13 May 1943
Sicily	1943	14 May 1943 – 17 August 1943
Naples-Foggia	1943–1944	18 August 1943 – 21 January 1944
Anzio	1944	22 January 1944 – 24 May 1944
Rome-Arno	1944	22 January 1944 – 9 September 1944
North Apennines	1944–1945	10 September 1944 – 4 April 1945
Po Valley	1945	5 April 1945 – 8 May 1945
Air Offensive, Europe	1942–1944	4 July 1942 – 5 June 1944
Normandy	1944	6 June 1944 – 24 July 1944
Northern France	1944	25 July 1944 – 14 September 1944
Southern France	1944	15 August 1944 – 14 September 1944
Rhineland	1944–1945	15 September 1944 – 21 March 1945
Ardennes-Alsace	1944–1945	16 December 1944 – 25 January 1945
Central Europe	1945	22 March 1945 – 11 May 1945
European-African-Middle Eastern Theater	Non-combat credit	7 December 1941 – 8 November 1945

==== Asiatic-Pacific Theater ====
Asiatic-Pacific Campaign		
Campaign name embroidered on streamer	Date embroidered on streamer	Inclusive dates
Air Combat	1941–1945	7 December 1941 – 2 September 1945
Antisubmarine	1941–1945	7 December 1941 – 2 September 1945
Central Pacific	1941–1943	7 December 1941 – 6 December 1943
Philippine Islands	1941–1942	7 December 1941 – 10 May 1942
East Indies	1942	1 January 1942 – 22 July 1942
Papua	1942–1943	23 July 1942 – 23 January 1943
Aleutian Islands	1942–1943	3 June 1942 – 24 August 1943
Guadalcanal	1942–1943	7 August 1942 – 21 February 1943
Northern Solomons	1943–1944	22 February 1943 – 21 November 1944
Bismarck Archipelago	1943–1944	15 December 1943 – 27 November 1944
Eastern Mandates	1943–1944	7 December 1943 – 16 April 1944
Western Pacific	1944–1945	17 April 1944 – 2 September 1945
New Guinea	1943–1944	24 January 1943 – 31 December 1944
Leyte	1944–1945	17 October 1944 – 1 July 1945
Luzon	1944–1945	15 December 1944 – 4 July 1945
Southern Philippines	1945	27 February 1945 – 4 July 1945
Burma	1941–1942	7 December 1941 – 26 May 1942
India-Burma	1942–1945	2 April 1942 – 28 January 1945
Central Burma	1945	29 January 1945 – 15 July 1945
China Defensive	1942–1945	4 July 1942 – 4 May 1945
China Offensive	1945	5 May 1945 – 2 September 1945
Ryukyus	1945	26 March 1945 – 2 July 1945
Air Offensive, Japan	1942–1945	17 April 1942 – 2 September 1945
Asiatic-Pacific Theater	Non-combat credit	27 June 1950 – 27 July 1954

=== Korean War ===
Korean Service		
Campaign name embroidered on streamer	Date embroidered on streamer	Inclusive dates
UN Defensive	1950	27 July 1950 – 15 September 1950
UN Offensive	1950	16 September 1950 – 2 November 1950
CCF Intervention	1950–1951	3 November 1950 – 24 January 1951
First UN Counter-offensive	1951	25 January 1951 – 21 April 1951
CCF Spring Offensive	1951	22 April 1951 – 8 July 1951
UN Summer-Fall Offensive	1951	9 July 1951 – 27 November 1951
Second Korean Winter	1951–1952	28 November 1951 – 30 April 1952
Korea, Summer-Fall	1952	1 May 1952 – 30 November 1952
Third Korean Winter	1952–1953	1 December 1952 – 30 April 1953
Korea, Summer	1953	1 May 1953 – 27 July 1953
Korean Theater	Non-combat credit	27 June 1950 – 27 July 1954

=== Vietnam War ===
Vietnam Service		
Campaign name embroidered on streamer	Date embroidered on streamer	Inclusive dates
Vietnam Advisory	1961–1965	15 November 1961 – 1 March 1965
Vietnam Defensive	1965–1966	2 March 1965 – 30 January 1966
Vietnam Air	1966	31 January 1966 – 28 June 1966
Vietnam Air Offensive	1966–1967	29 June 1966 – 8 March 1967
Vietnam Air Offensive, Phase II	1967–1968	9 March 1967 – 31 March 1968
Vietnam Air/Ground	1968	22 January 1968 – 7 July 1968
Vietnam Air Offensive, Phase III	1968	1 April 1968 – 31 October 1968
Vietnam Air Offensive, Phase IV	1968–1969	1 November 1968 – 22 February 1969
TET 69/Counter-offensive	1969	23 February 1969 – 8 June 1969
Vietnam Summer-Fall	1969	9 June 1969 – 31 October 1969
Vietnam Winter-Spring	1969–1970	1 November 1969 – 30 April 1970
Sanctuary Counter-offensive	1970	1 May 1970 – 30 June 1970
Southwest Monsoon	1970	1 July 1970 – 30 November 1970
Commando Hunt V	1970–1971	1 December 1970 – 14 May 1971
Commando Hunt VI	1971	15 May 1971 – 31 October 1971
Commando Hunt VII	1971–1972	1 November 1971 – 29 March 1972
Vietnam Ceasefire	1972–1973	30 March 1972 – 28 January 1973
Vietnam Theater	Non-combat credit	1 July 1958 – 28 March 1973

=== Persian Gulf War and Iraqi no-fly zone enforcement ===
Southwest Asia Service		
Campaign name embroidered on streamer	Date embroidered on streamer	Inclusive dates
Defense of Saudi Arabia	1990–1991	2 August 1990 – 16 January 1991
Liberation and Defense of Kuwait	1991	17 January 1991 – 11 April 1991
Southwest Asia Ceasefire (Note: U.S. Air Force organizations to receive credit for this campaign have not yet been identified.)	1991–1995	12 April 1991 – 30 November 1995
Southwest Asia Theater	Non-combat credit	2 August 1990 – 20 November 1995

=== Kosovo War ===
Kosovo Campaign		
Campaign name embroidered on streamer	Date embroidered on streamer	Inclusive dates
Kosovo Air Campaign	1999	24 March 1999 – 10 June 1999

=== Global War on Terrorism ===
Global War on Terrorism Service		
Campaign name embroidered on streamer	Date embroidered on streamer	Inclusive dates
Global War on Terrorism		September 2001 – present

== See also ==
- Flags of the United States Armed Forces
