= Ensign of the United States =

Flag of the United States

United States of America
- Other names: The Stars and Stripes, Old Glory
- Use: National flag and ensign
- Proportion: 10:19
- Adopted: June 14, 1777 (13-star version); July 4, 1960 (50-star version)
- Design: Thirteen horizontal stripes alternating red and white; in the canton, 50 white stars on a blue field
- Designed by: Unknown, possibly Francis Hopkinson

The ensign of the United States is the flag of the United States when worn as an ensign (a type of maritime flag identifying nationality, usually flown from the stern of a ship or boat, or from an installation or facility of the United States Navy, United States Marine Corps, United States Coast Guard or the National Oceanographic and Atmospheric Administration ashore). International maritime law—see International Treaty on Law of the Sea, articles 91 and 92—provides that vessels have a "national character" and thus should display a flag (ensign) that corresponds to this national character, especially when in international or foreign waters. Vessels that are formally documented under the federal vessel documentation act, vessels owned by government bodies in the United States, and vessels in the U.S. military unquestionably have U.S. national character, and thus properly hoist a U.S. ensign to show their national character. Vessels that are numbered by the states (see 46 USC section 411) and small, non-registered craft owned by U.S. citizens and not registered in other countries may also hoist a U.S. ensign to show their national character.

The U.S. Yacht Ensign (a variation of the national ensign; see below) is often used in place of the national flag by U.S. pleasure craft when operating within U.S. waters; this flag was legally required for licensed yachts from 1848 to 1980, and the practice continues among all U.S. pleasure craft in U.S. waters by longstanding historical use and custom. Additionally, a few smaller pleasure craft operated by members of the United States Power Squadrons will fly the U.S. Power Squadrons flag as an ensign in inland waters in lieu of the national flag (see below). All vessels of U.S. national character should display the national ensign when operating in international and non-U.S. waters.

== Military ensigns ==
=== The naval ensign and its first salute ===
De facto naval ensign of the United States until June 14, 1777.

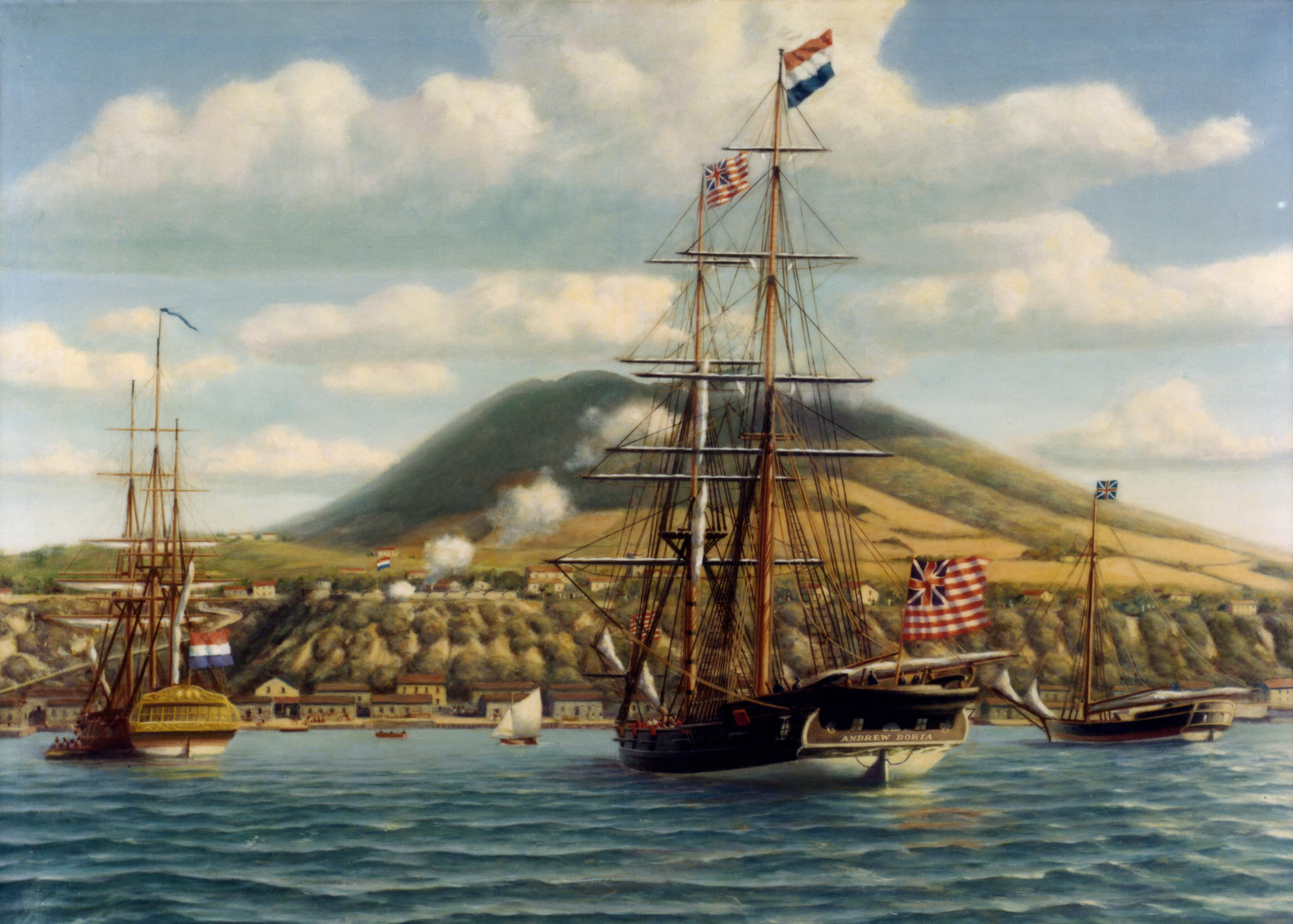
First official salute to the flag on board the U.S. warship Andrew Doria in a foreign port, at St. Eustatius in the West Indies, on November 16, 1776

The Continental Union Flag, referred to as the "Flag of America", was the de facto naval ensign of the United States until June 14, 1777, when the 13 star flag was adopted by Congress. It was first hoisted aboard Commodore Esek Hopkins' flagship Alfred on the Delaware River by Lieutenant John Paul Jones on December 3, 1775.

The current "Stars and Stripes" design was first adopted when the Second Continental Congress passed the Flag Resolution of June 14, 1777: "Resolved, That the flag of the thirteen United States be thirteen stripes, alternate red and white; that the union be thirteen stars, white in a blue field, representing a new constellation." Subsequent flag acts have revised the design as new states joined the union.

The 13-star "boat flag", 1912

Denmark and the Netherlands were the first countries to salute the Continental Union Flag, when gun salutes by U.S. ships were returned by officials in the West Indies in late 1776: on Danish St. Croix in October, and on Dutch St. Eustatius in November. (Though later, the better documented St. Eustatius incident involving the USS Andrew Doria is traditionally regarded as the "first salute".) France was the first country to salute the Stars and Stripes, when a fleet off the French mainland returned a gun salute by Captain John Paul Jones commanding USS Ranger on February 14, 1778.

In the 19th century the ensigns were quite large; the biggest ensign in 1870 measured 19 by 36 feet (5.8 by 11.0 m). By the early 20th century, as warships took on distinctive forms and could no longer be easily mistaken for merchantmen at a distance, ensigns began to shrink and today are a fraction of their earlier size – the largest ensign for daily use on ships is now 5 by 9.5 feet (1.5 by 2.9 m).

During the 19th century, for its smaller-sized ensigns, the U.S. Navy used a 13-star flag which became known as "boat flag" due to its predominant use on boats (i.e., launches, gigs and tenders). The Navy appears to have started this practice in the 1850s and is formally documented in the Navy Regulations of 1864. The reason for the lesser number of stars was so that the stars in a smaller size flag would have greater visibility at a distance. Because they flew smaller-sized ensigns, the U.S. Navy's first submarines and destroyers in the early 20th century also used the 13-star ensigns. In 1912, President President Taft formally recognized the Navy's longstanding use of the 13-star ensign in Executive Order 1637, which defined the flag's precise dimensions. The "boat flags'" formal recognition lasted just four more years however, as President Wilson acting through Secretary of the Navy Josephus Daniels discontinued the practice in 1916 with Executive Order 2390, after which all ensigns were supposed to have the full complement of stars. However, some of the flags remained in the supply system until the 1950s.

=== Coast Guard Ensign and the Customs Ensign ===
Coast Guard Ensign

Customs Ensign

The United States Coast Guard flies a unique ensign to show that it has the authority to stop, board, examine, and seize vessels. The U.S. Customs Service flies a very similar flag, but it lacks the badge in the fly. These flags have their origins in a flag that was created in 1799 that was, at that time, intended to be used as an ensign and was in fact so used (i.e., a full standing flag of national character). Today, these two flags are called "ensigns" but they are flown in conjunction with, and subordinate to, the U.S. national ensign on Coast Guard and on Customs vessels. Most small craft operated by the U.S. Coast Guard routinely display both the national ensign and Coast Guard Ensign.

These two present-day flags had their origins in a flag that was designed by Secretary of the Treasury Oliver Wolcott Jr. for use by the Revenue-Marine in August 1799. On August 1, 1799, Wolcott issued an order announcing that in pursuance of authority from the President, the distinguishing ensign and pennant for the Revenue-Marine would consist of "16 perpendicular stripes, alternate red and white, the union of the ensign to be the arms of the United States in a dark blue on a white field". This was done to avoid confusion of Treasury Department vessels with those of the United States Navy. From 1799 onwards, this flag was used as the national ensign for the Revenue-Marine (from 1894 known as the Revenue Cutter Service) and at the same time, was also flown over Customs Houses ashore. In 1895, 27 June, Assistant Secretary of the Treasury Charles Sumner Hamlin issued an order that United States Revenue Cutter Service vessels must henceforth carry the national ensign at the main-peak and the revenue service ensign at the fore-peak. In June 1910, however, President William H. Taft ordered that the plain ensign continue to be flown over Customs Houses ashore, and ordered that the Revenue Cutter Service add their department's emblem to the fly of the ensign in order to distinguish between the differing two branches. The order said: "By virtue of the authority vested in me under the provisions of Sec. 2764 of the revised Statutes, I hereby prescribe that the distinguishing flag now used by vessels of the Revenue Cutter Service be marked by the distinctive emblem of that service, in blue and white, placed on a line with the lower edge of the union, and over the center of the seventh vertical red stripe from the mast of said flag, the emblem to cover a horizontal space of three stripes. This change to be made as soon as practicable."

From 1910 onwards, the U.S. Customs Service has continued to use the plain version of the revenue ensign, while the Revenue Cutter Service (which in 1915 merged with the United States Life-Saving Service to form the Coast Guard) used the defaced version (version with the badge).

The U.S. Coast Guard inherited the "badged" version of the ensign in 1915 and, in 1927, the cutter badge was updated to use the Coast Guard's own emblem. The Coast Guard badge was slightly modified in 1966. The Coast Guard continues to use the "badged" or "defaced" version of the ensign, although it is now flown by Coast Guard cutters and facilities in conjunction with the U.S. national ensign, and not as a stand-alone ensign.

The design of both flags' (Customs and Coast Guard) cantons (i.e., the eagle and stars) was altered in 1951 to make them conform to "the arms of the United States", as was specified in Wolcott's original design statement in 1799.

== Civilian ensigns ==
Possible 18th century merchant ensign.

=== Striped merchant ensign ===
Information about early U.S. civil ensigns is scant, but there is evidence that at the time of the American Revolution some U.S. merchant ships flew a horizontally striped flag of 13 alternating red and white stripes. These flags with vertical stripes are similar to ones flown by the Sons of Liberty (Such ensigns may also have served as early U.S. naval jacks in conjunction with the Continental Union Flag used as a naval ensign.) In the early years of the United States, ensigns were not yet standardized, leading to number of known variations, such as the Serapis ensign used by John Paul Jones.

=== Yacht ensign ===
The United States Yacht Ensign

A modification of the national flag and ensign, featuring a fouled anchor surrounded by thirteen stars in the canton, was established by Act of Congress in August 1848 for use by licensed U.S. yachts. The design was recommended by the New York Yacht Club in 1849.

Initially, yachts eligible for a licence had to be at least 20 net tons, later reduced to 15, and eligible for enrolment as U.S. vessels. The licence allowed them to travel between ports without clearing customs. The 1848 Act required licensed yachts to use a "signal" prescribed by the Secretary of the Navy, who approved a modification of the American ensign for this purpose. Treasury decisions in 1876 and 1889 subsequently confirmed its use as an ensign and referred to it as the "yacht ensign". Although the requirement initially applied only to licensed yachts, other U.S. yachts also began using the flag, and the U.S. Navy eventually recognised the practice. In 1939, the Secretary of the Navy approved a ruling that Navy ships should return a yacht's salute when it was flying the yacht ensign and that the ensign could properly be saluted when boarding or leaving a yacht.

The statutory requirement for licensed yachts to fly the Yacht Ensign, then contained in 46 U.S.C. § 109, was repealed by the Vessel Documentation Act of 1980 (Public Law 96–594). The Act abolished several provisions relating to the by-then largely obsolete category of "licensed yachts" and placed documented recreational vessels on the same legal footing. Nevertheless, the Yacht Ensign continued to be widely used because of its long association with U.S. yachting and because the customs-clearance exemption originally granted to licensed yachts had long since been extended to all U.S. pleasure craft, whether federally documented or state-numbered (see 19 U.S.C. § 1441). It therefore remains widely flown by U.S. yachts and pleasure boats in domestic waters, continuing a tradition dating from the nineteenth century.

The states of Arkansas, Maryland, and Washington have adopted flag protocols stating that the U.S. ensign and Yacht Ensign are interchangeable on recreational vessels in U.S. waters. Similarly, the United States Power Squadrons' guide to flags and flag etiquette, prepared in consultation with the Coast Guard, Coast Guard Auxiliary, New York Yacht Club and others, states that the Yacht Ensign may be used instead of the national ensign by U.S. recreational boats of all types and sizes in domestic waters. The ordinary national ensign should be used in international or foreign waters.

=== Power Squadrons ensign ===
The United States Power Squadrons ensign, as a signal, indicates membership of the organization.

The United States Power Squadrons (or USPS) is a non-profit educational organization whose mission is to improve maritime safety and enjoyability through classes in seamanship, navigation, and other related subjects. In 1914, it adopted its own flag, which was then patented in 1916. This flag may be worn as a signal flag on the signal hoist, typically in the starboard rigging. Despite its name and the original intent of its designers, it was never recognized by the U.S. government or navy as a national ensign; however, some smaller boats will wear this flag in place of a national ensign, usually because they lack a mast and do not operate outside home waters. The U.S. Power Squadrons manual of flag etiquette states, "The preferred location for flying the USPS ensign is the starboard yardarm or spreader halyard. It may be worn there day and night."

== State maritime flags ==
Naval and maritime flag of Massachusetts

In April 1776, the Massachusetts Navy adopted, as its flag, a white field charged with a green pine tree and the motto "An Appeal to Heaven". In 1971 the motto was removed, and the flag was designated "the naval and maritime flag of the Commonwealth".

Merchant and Marine Flag of Maine

Maine also has a separate ensign, which is rarely seen. It features symbols from the current flag and the older one, with a white field and green pine tree. The green pine tree has the seaman's anchor, and the words "MAINE" and "DIRIGO" around it. Dirigo (Latin "I direct" or "I lead") is the state motto of Maine.

Massachusetts and Maine are the only two states with their own maritime flags. These flags are not "ensigns" in the true sense of the word because they are not flags of national character, and are not used as such; instead, they are special versions of the state flag for use afloat. The state laws that create them do not use the term "ensign" to describe them, but use the term "flag". The Massachusetts law describes the flag as "The naval and maritime flag of the commonwealth" (Mass. Gen. Laws Ann. ch. 2, § 3), while Maine's state law says: "The flag to be known as the merchant and marine flag of the State shall be of white, at the top of which in blue letters shall be the motto 'Dirigo'; beneath the motto shall be the representation of a pine tree in green color" (Me. Rev. Stat. tit. 1, § 207). Although these flags are intended for use afloat, they are not ensigns and should not be called such.

== See also ==
- Flags of the U.S. states#Current state ensigns
