= Flag of the United States Army =

United States Army
- Use: Other
- Proportion: 33:26
- Adopted: 12 June 1956; 70 years ago
- Design: A blue replica of the War Office Seal set on a white field. Beneath the seal is a broad scarlet scroll bearing the inscription in white letters, "UNITED STATES ARMY". Beneath the scroll, in blue sans serif Arabic numerals, is "1775".
- Designed by: The Institute of Heraldry
- Use: War flag
- Proportion: 4:3
- Adopted: 12 April 1962; 64 years ago
- Design: A white replica of the War Office Seal set on a blue field. Beneath the seal is a broad white scroll bearing the inscription in scarlet letters, "UNITED STATES ARMY". Beneath the scroll, in white sans serif Arabic numerals, is "1775".
- Designed by: The Institute of Heraldry

The flag of the United States Army displays a blue replica of the War Office Seal set on a white field. Beneath the seal is a broad scarlet scroll bearing the inscription in white letters, "United States Army". Beneath the scroll, in blue Arabic numerals, is "1775", the year in which the Continental Army was created with the appointment of General George Washington as General of the Army.

The flag was officially adopted by President Dwight D. Eisenhower on June 12, 1956, via Executive Order 10670.

== History ==
Before 1956, the Army was the only armed service without a flag, official or otherwise, to represent the entire service. In 1955, prompted by the need for a flag to represent the U.S. Army in joint service ceremonies, Secretary of the Army Wilber M. Brucker requested the creation of an army flag.

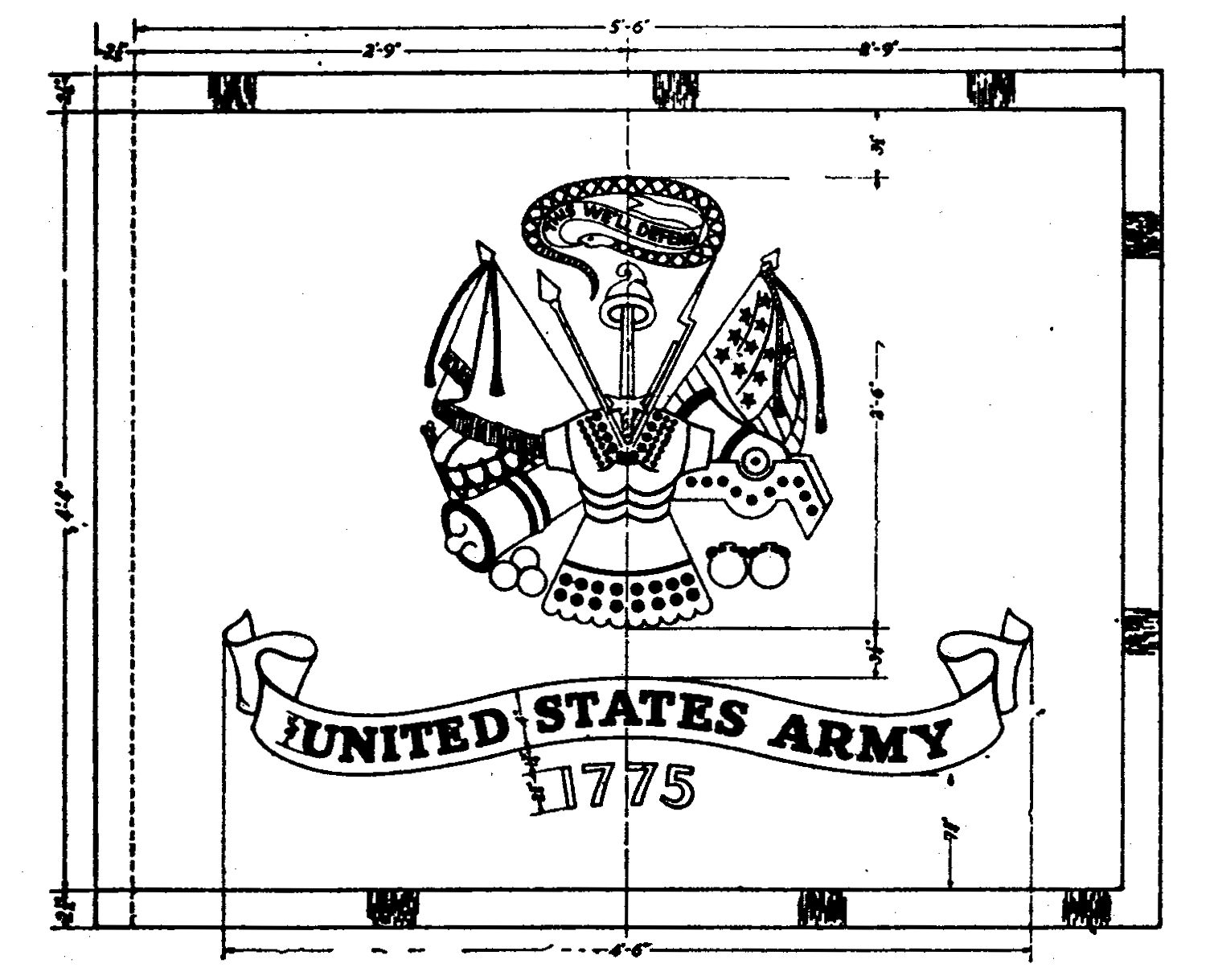
Official specifications, as defined in Executive Order 10670

The U.S. Army flag was dedicated and unfurled to the general public on 14 June 1956, at Independence Hall, Philadelphia, on the 181st anniversary of the establishment of the U.S. Army by the Continental Congress. The original flag measured 4 feet 4 inches (1.32 m) by 5 feet 6 inches (1.68 m); the flag is of white silk with a blue embroidered central design of the original War Office seal. "United States Army" is inscribed in white letters on a scarlet scroll, with the year "1775" in blue numerals below.

=== Streamers ===
The concept of campaign streamers began during the American Civil War when the War Department instructed regiments to inscribe the names of their meritorious battles on their national colors. The Army has defined an official campaign as a particular combat action or series of actions with historical significance or military importance to the United States and the Army.

In 1890, the War Department directed that regimental honors be engraved on silver rings placed on the staffs of regimental flags. In 1920, the War Department ordered that each regimental color bear streamers in the colors of the campaign medal ribbon for each campaign in which the regiment had fought. The creation of the Army flag provided a means to display all the Army's campaigns.

== See also ==
- Flags of the United States Armed Forces
