= List of flags of the United States =

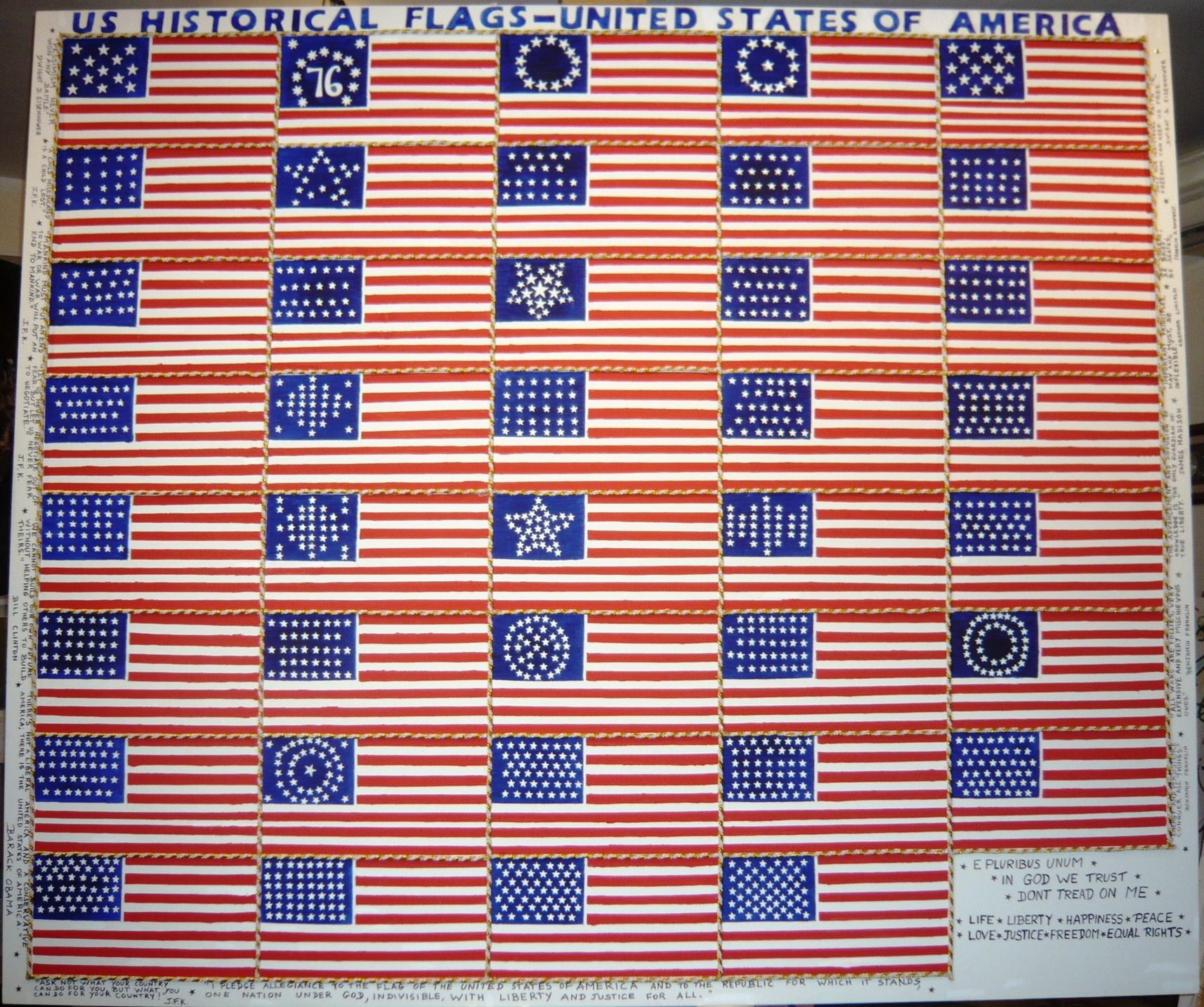
A 2.00 m × 1.70 m oil painting showing historical US flags.

This is a list of flags in the United States describing the evolution of the flag of the United States, as well as other flags used within the United States, such as the flags of governmental agencies. There are also separate flags for embassies and ships.

== National flags ==
=== Historical progression of designs ===
Since 1818, a star for each new state has been added to the flag on the Fourth of July the year immediately following each state's admission. In years in which multiple states have been admitted, the corresponding number of stars were added to the flag. This change has typically been the only change made with each revision of the flag since 1777, with the exception of changes in 1795 and 1818, which increased the number of stripes to 15 and then returned it to 13, respectively. As the exact pattern of stars was not specified prior to 1912, many of the historical U.S. national flags (shown below) have had varied arrangements of the stars.

1775–1777 (the "Continental Union")

1777–1795 (13 stars)

Betsy Ross circular 13-star version (1792)

"Hopkinson" version (1777–1795)

Battle of Bennington version (1777)

1795–1818 (the "Star-Spangled Banner", 15 stars, 15 stripes)

1818–1819 (20 stars)

1819–1820 (21 stars)

1820–1822 (23 stars)

1822–1836 (24 stars)

1836–1837 (25 stars)

1837–1845 (26 stars)

1845–1846 (27 stars)

1846–1847 (28 stars)

1847–1848 (29 stars)

1848–1851 (30 stars)

1851–1858 (31 stars)

1858–1859 (32 stars)

1859–1861 (33 stars)

1861–1863 (34 stars)

1863–1865 (35 stars)

1865–1867 (36 stars)

1867–1877 (37 stars)

1877–1890 (38 stars)

1890–1891 (43 stars)

1891–1896 (44 stars)

1896–1908 (45 stars)

1908–1912 (46 stars)

1912–1959 (48 stars)

1959–1960 (49 stars)

1960–present (50 stars)

== Executive branch flags ==
=== Office of the President ===
Flag of the President

Flag of the Executive Office of the President

Flag of the Trade Representative

=== Office of the Vice President ===
Flag of the Vice President

Color of the Vice President

=== Department of State ===
Flag of the Department of State

Flag of the Secretary of State

Flag of the Deputy Secretary of State

Flag of an Assistant Secretary of State

Flag of United States ambassadors

Flag of a Consular officer

Flag of a Foreign Service officer

=== Department of the Treasury ===
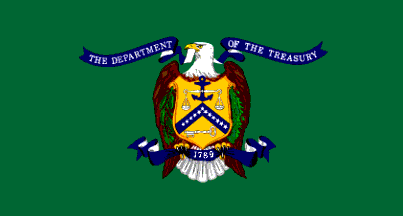
Flag of the Department of the Treasury

Flag of the Secretary of the Treasury

Flag of the Deputy Secretary of the Treasury

Flag of an Under Secretary of the Treasury

Flag of an Assistant Secretary of the Treasury

Flag of the Comptroller of the Currency

=== Department of Defense ===
Flag of the Secretary of Defense

Flag of the Deputy Secretary of Defense

Flag of the Inspector General of the Department of Defense

Flag of an Undersecretary of Defense

Flag of an Assistant Secretary of Defense

Flag of the Chairman of the Joint Chiefs of Staff

Flag of the Vice Chairman of the Joint Chiefs of Staff

Flag of the Senior Enlisted Advisor to the Chairman

Flag of the Supreme Allied Commander Europe

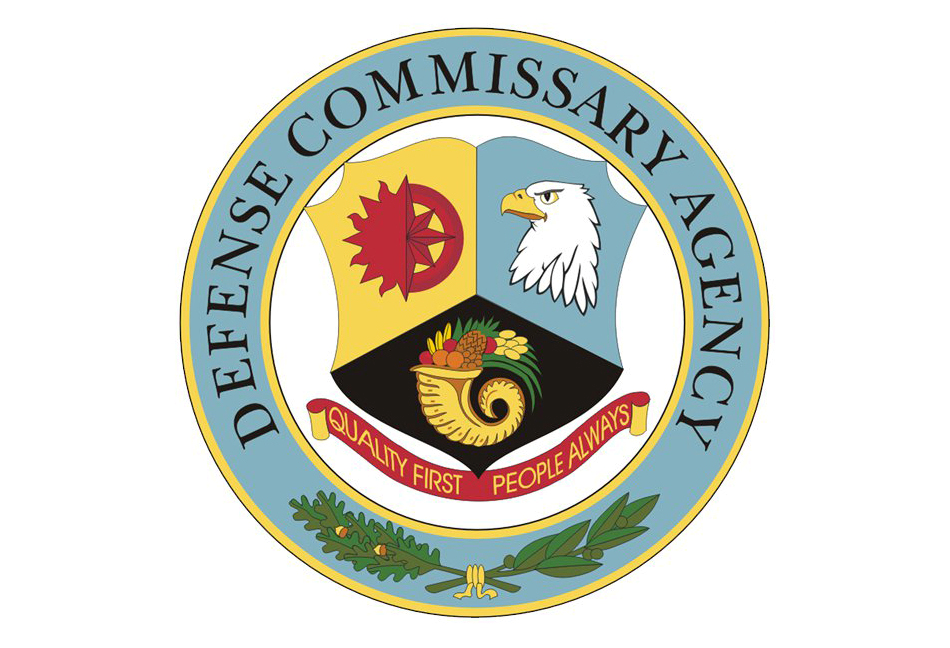
Flag of the Defense Commissary Agency

Flag of the Defense Innovation Unit

Flag of the National Geospatial-Intelligence Agency

Flag of the National Reconnaissance Office

Flag of the National Security Agency

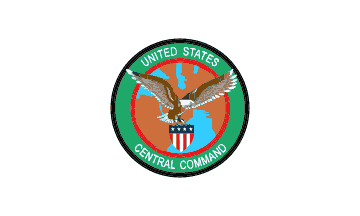
Flag of Central Command

Flag of Space Command

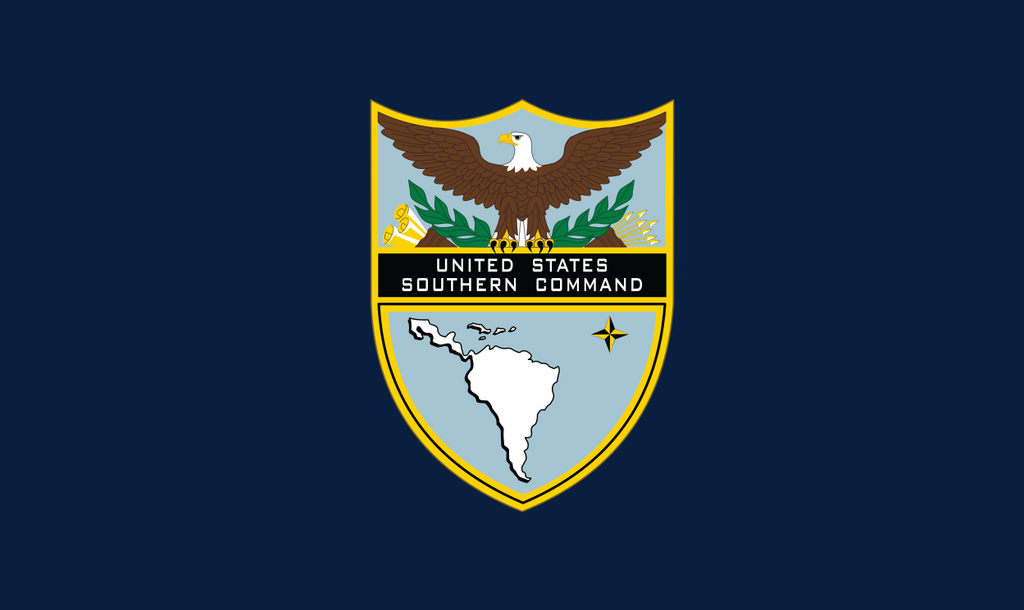
Flag of Southern Command

Flag of the United States Forces Korea

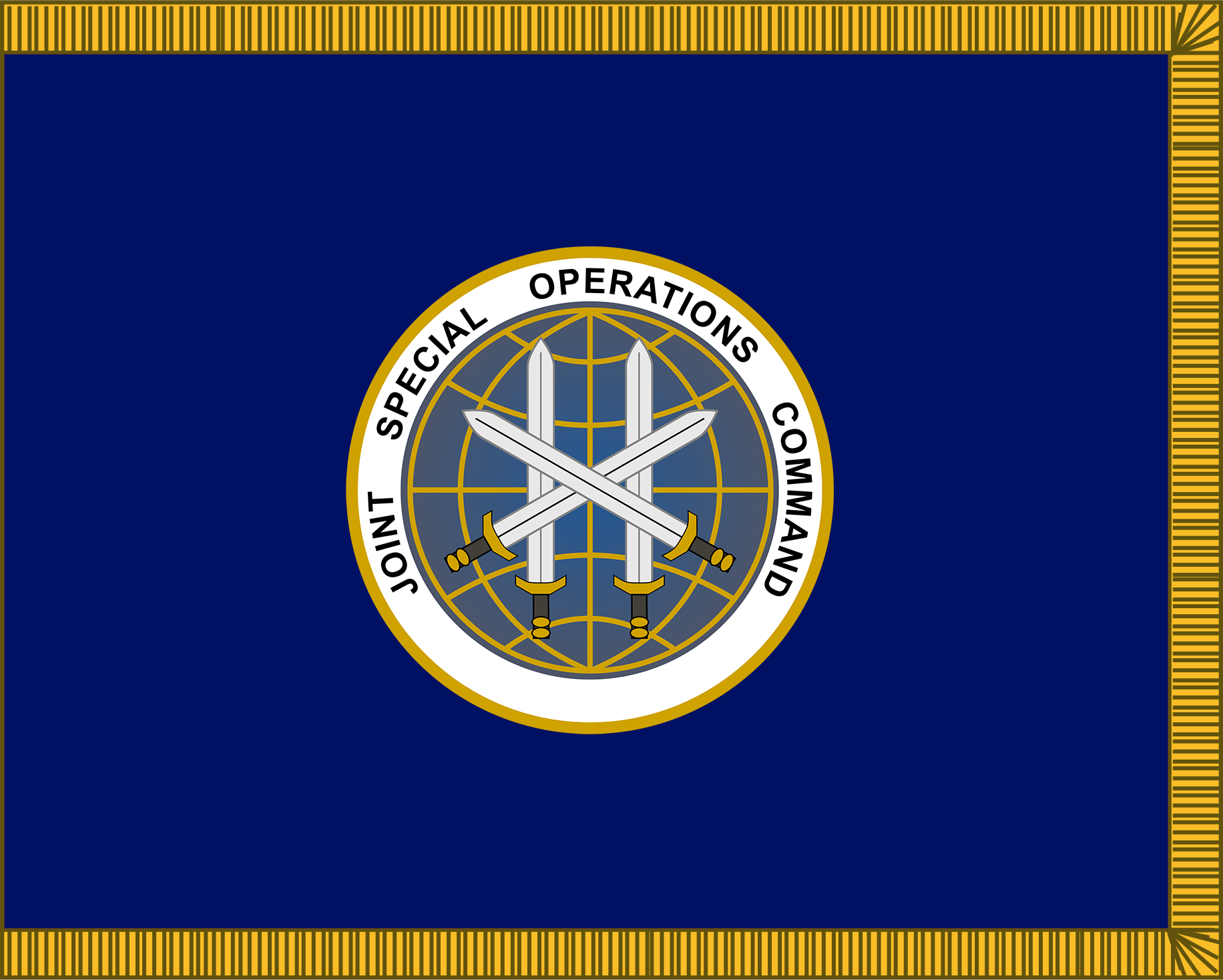
Flag of the Joint Special Operations Command

==== Department of the Army ====
Flag of the Secretary of the Army

Flag of the Under Secretary of the Army

Flag of an Assistant Secretary of the Army

===== Army =====
Flag of the Army

Field flag of the Army

Flag of the Chief of Staff of the Army

Flag of the Vice Chief of Staff of the Army

Flag of the Sergeant Major of the Army

Flag of the Chief of the Army Reserve

Flag of the Surgeon General of the Army

Flag of the Judge Advocate General of the Army

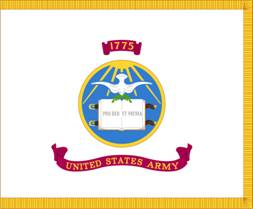
Flag of the Chief of Chaplains of the Army

Flag of the Army Provost Marshal General

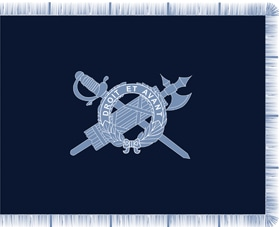
Flag of the Inspector General of the Army

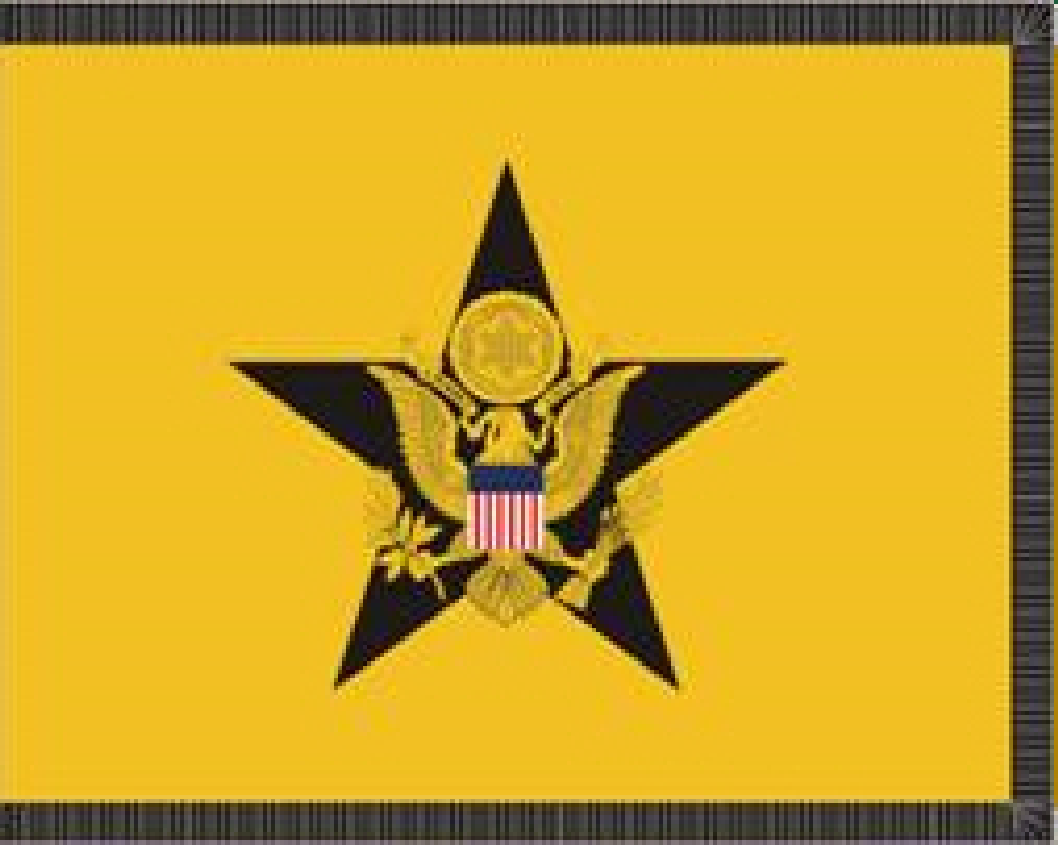
Flag of the Deputy Chief of Staff G-1 Personnel of the Army

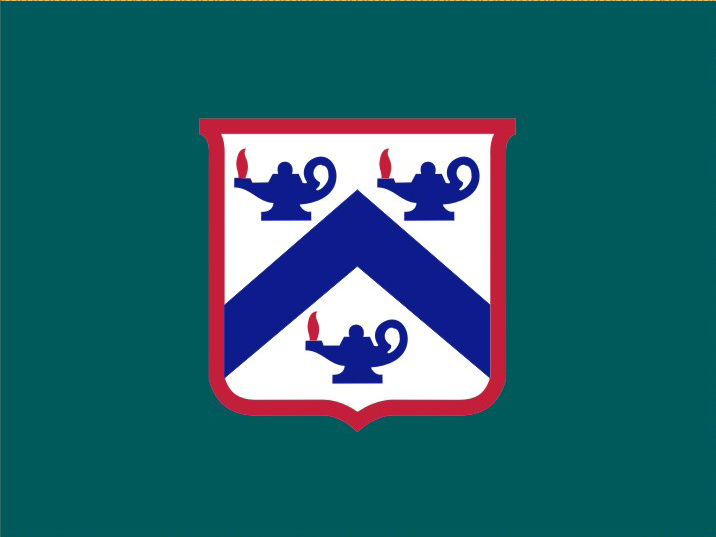
Flag of the Army Combined Arms Center

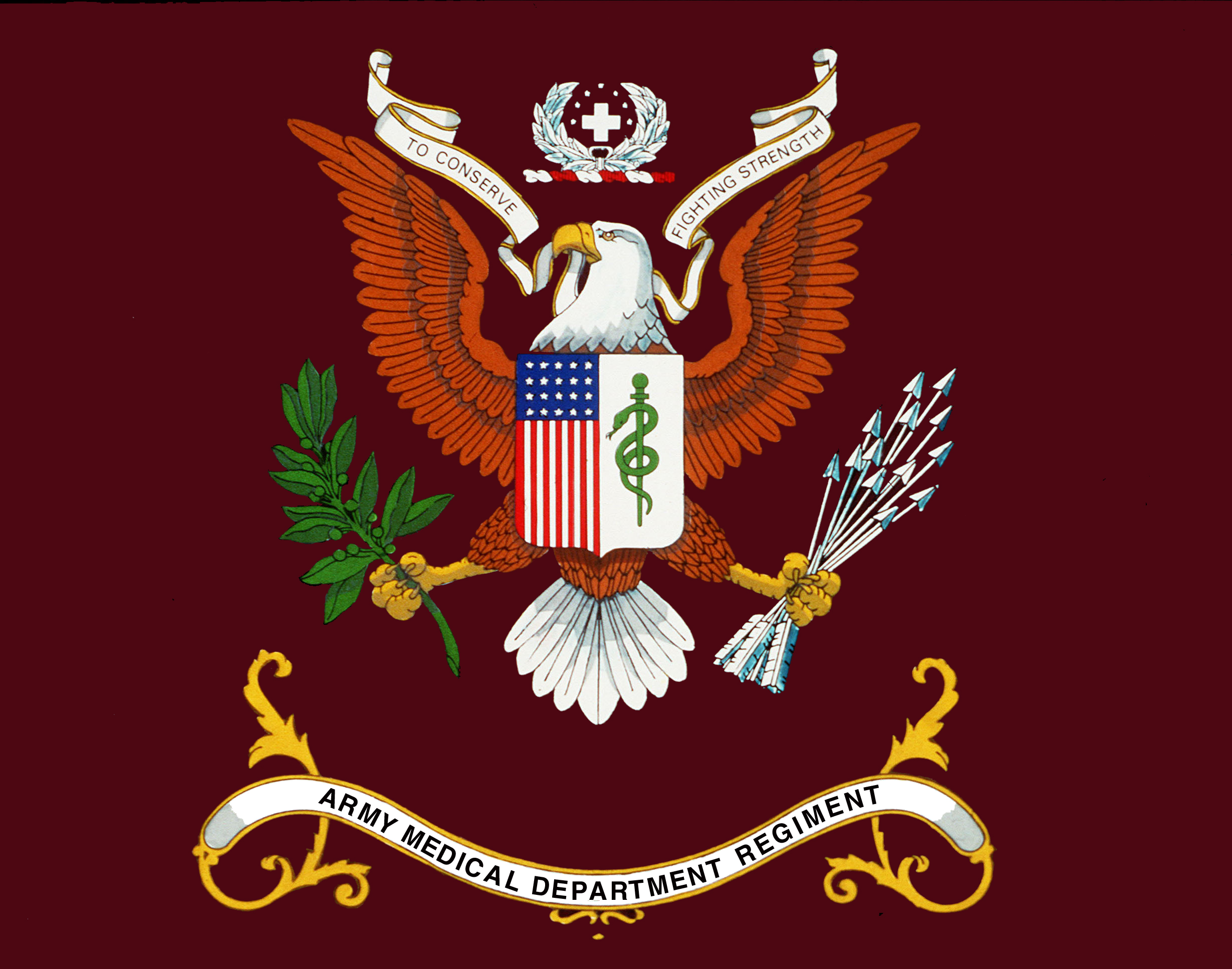
Flag of the Army Medical Department Center and School

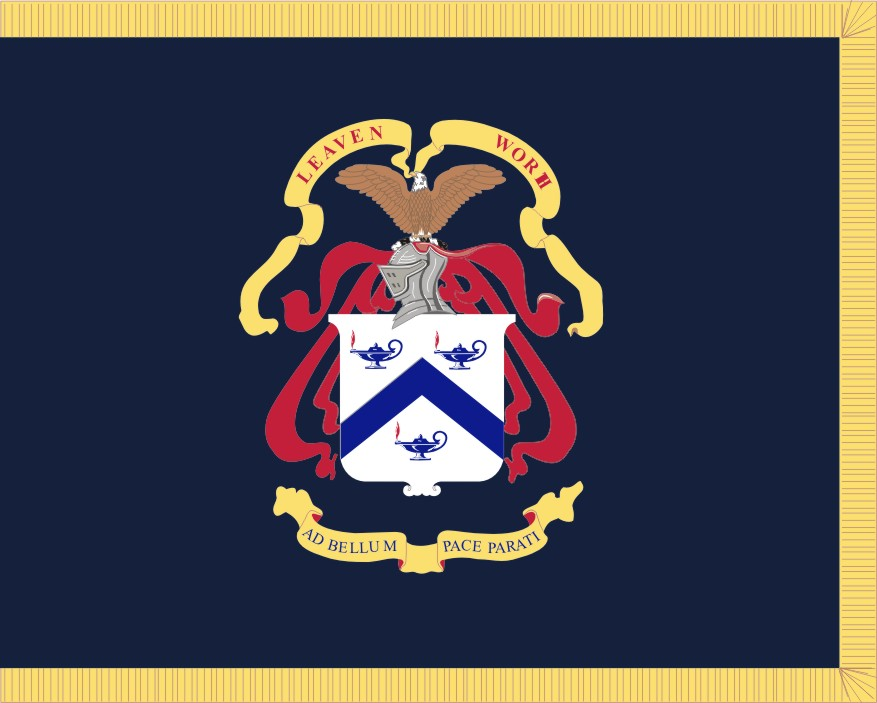
Flag of the Army Command and General Staff College

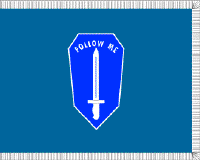
Flag of the Army Infantry School

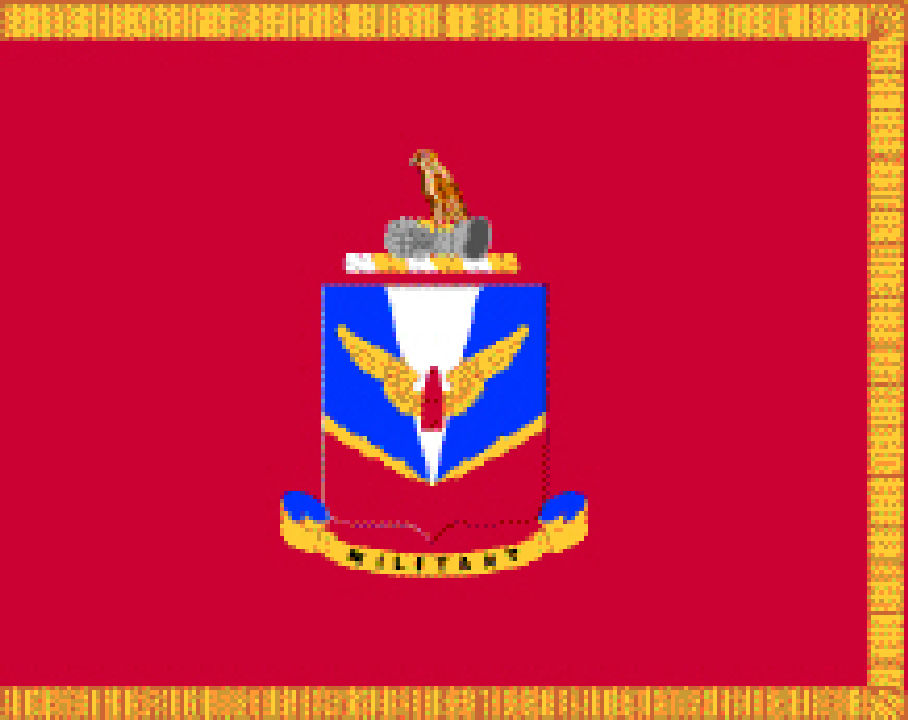
Flag of the Army Air Defense Artillery School

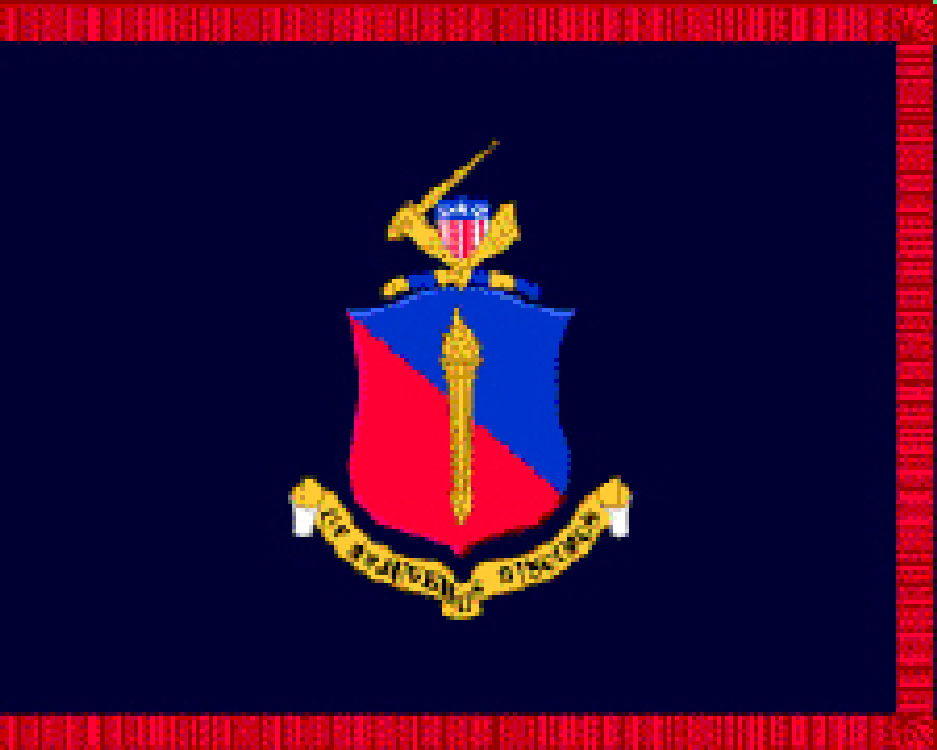
Flag of the Army Adjutant General School

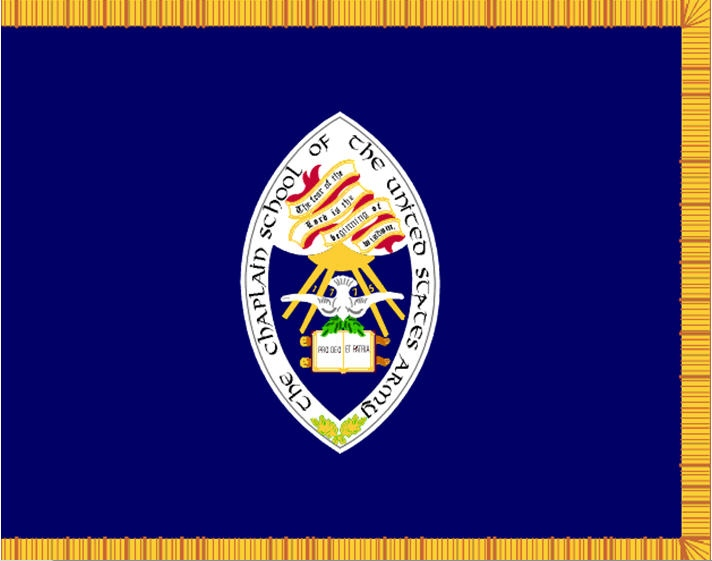
Flag of the Army Chaplain School

Flag of the Army Adjutant General's Corps

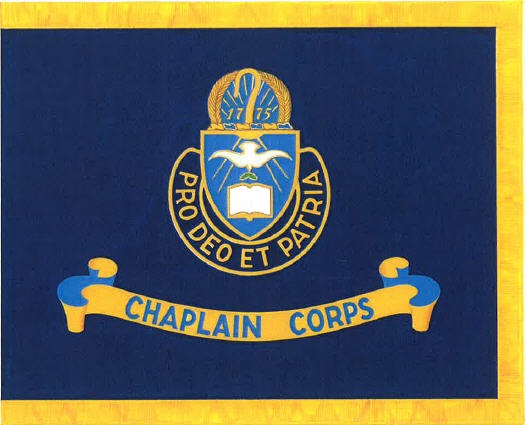
Flag of the Army Chaplain Corps

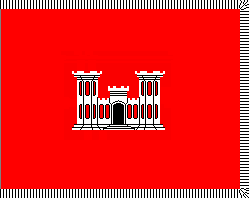
Flag of the Army Corps of Engineers

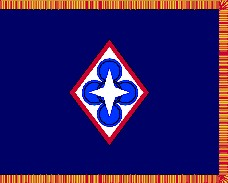
Flag of the Army Combined Arms Support Command

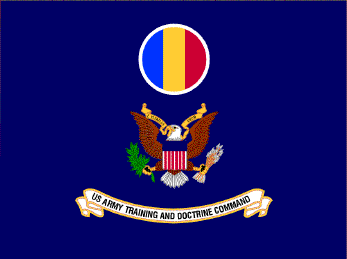
Flag of the Army Training and Doctrine Command

Flag of a General of the Army

Flag of an Army general

Flag of an Army lieutenant general

Flag of an Army major general

Flag of an Army brigadier general

Flag of the First Army

Flag of the Second Army

Flag of Army Central

Flag of the Fourth Army

Flag of Army North

Flag of the Sixth Army

Flag of the Seventh Army

Flag of the Eighth Army

Flag of the I Corps

Flag of the XVIII Airborne Corps

Flag of the 1st Armored Division

Flag of the 2nd Armored Division

Flag of the 3rd Armored Division

Flag of the 1st Cavalry Division

Flag of the 1st Infantry Division

Flag of the 2nd Infantry Division

Flag of the 3rd Infantry Division

Flag of the 10th Mountain Division

Flag of the 25th Infantry Division

Flag of the 28th Infantry Division

Flag of the 29th Infantry Division

Flag of the 36th Infantry Division

Flag of the 40th Infantry Division

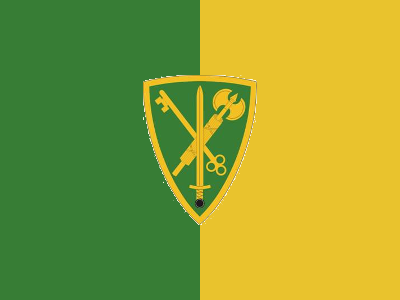
Flag of the 42nd Military Police Brigade

Flag of the 82nd Airborne Division

Flag of the 101st Airborne Division

Flag of the 297th Military Intelligence Battalion

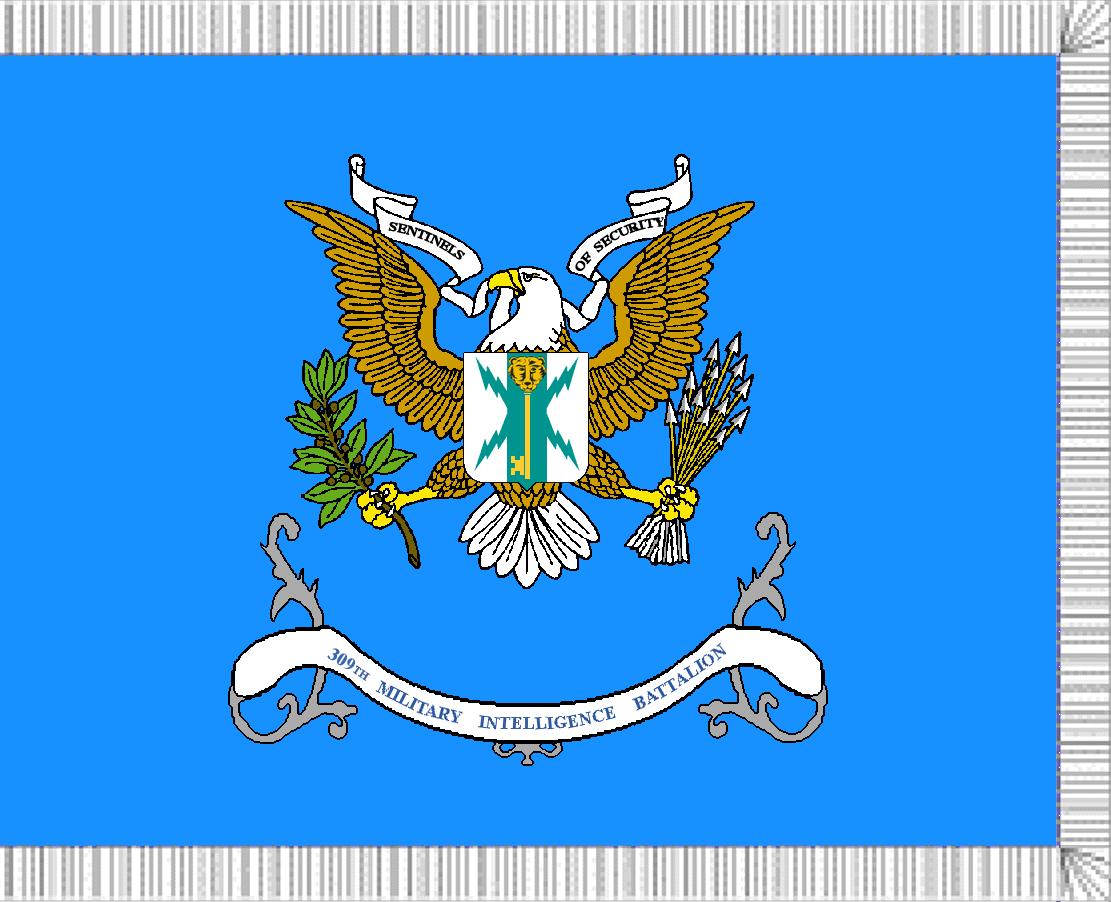
Flag of the 309th Military Intelligence Battalion

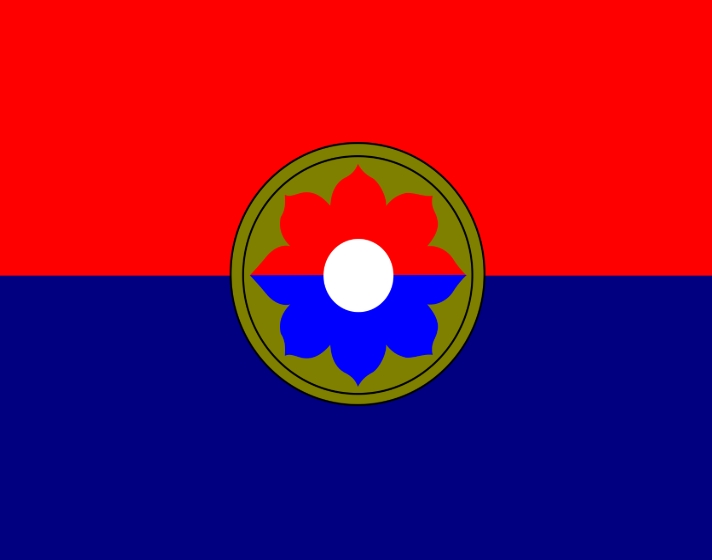
Flag of the 9th Infantry Division

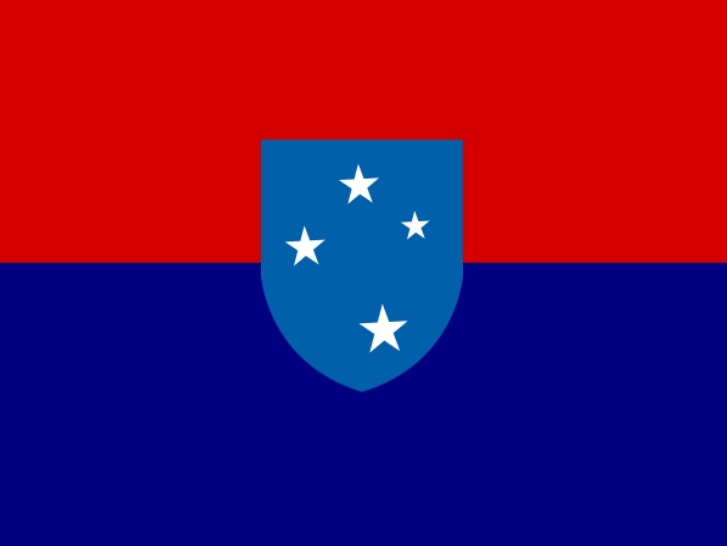
Flag of the 23rd Infantry Division

==== Department of the Navy ====
Flag of the Secretary of the Navy

Flag of the Under Secretary of the Navy

Flag of an Assistant Secretary of the Navy

===== Navy =====
Flag of the Navy

Flag of the Chief of Naval Operations

Flag of the Vice Chief of Naval Operations

Flag of the Navy fleet admiral

Flag of an unrestricted line (URL) Navy admiral (staff corps flag officers have white flags with the appropriate number of blue stars in an identical pattern as URL admiral's flags).

Flag of an URL Navy vice admiral

Flag of an URL Navy rear admiral

Flag of an URL Navy rear admiral (lower half)

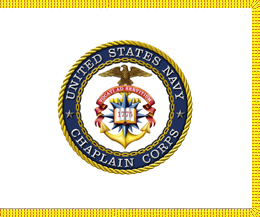
Flag of United States Navy Chaplain Corps

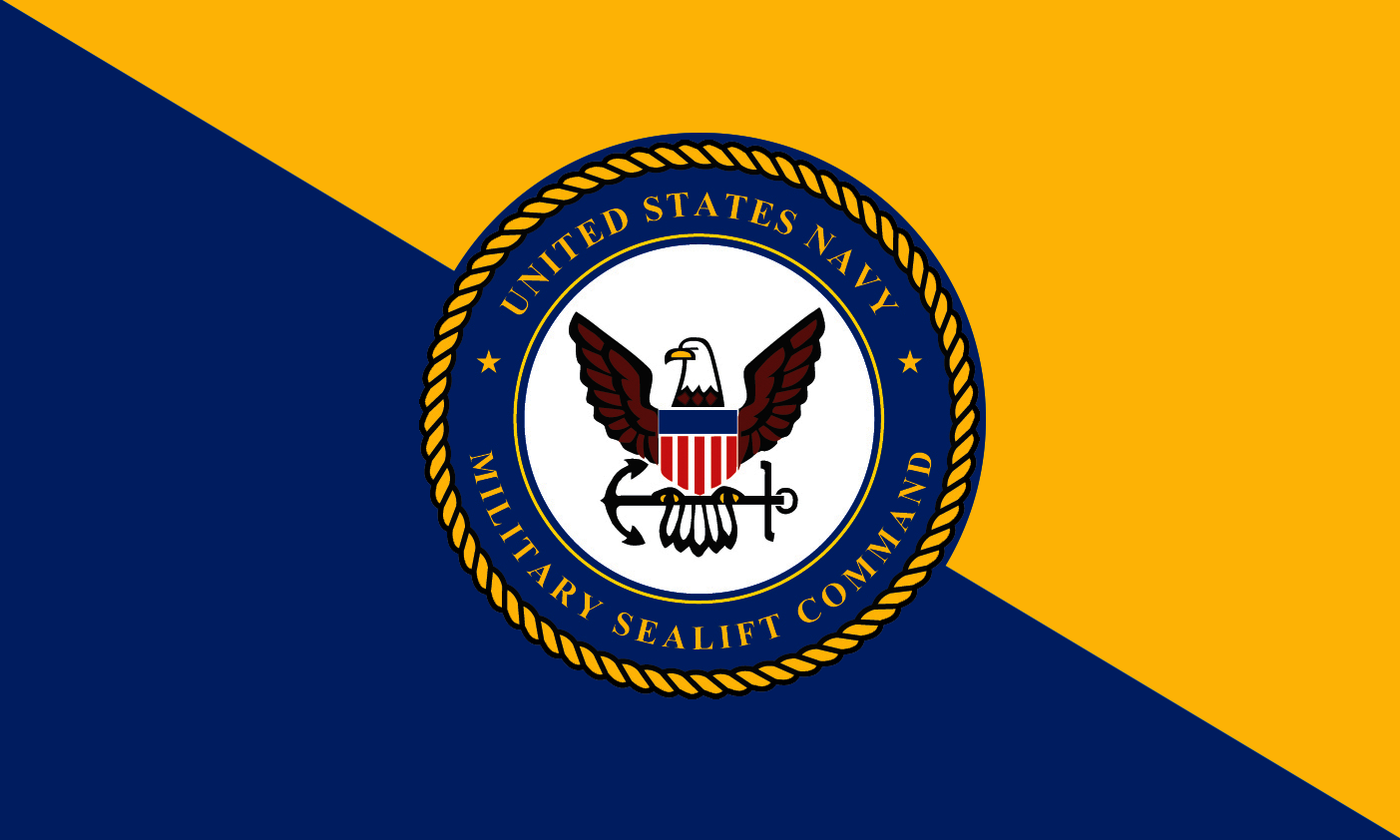
Flag of Military Sealift Command

Church Pennant

Jewish Worship Pennant

===== Marine Corps =====
Flag of the Marine Corps

Flag of the Commandant of the Marine Corps

Flag of a Marine Corps general

Flag of a Marine Corps lieutenant general

Flag of a Marine Corps major general

Flag of a Marine Corps brigadier general

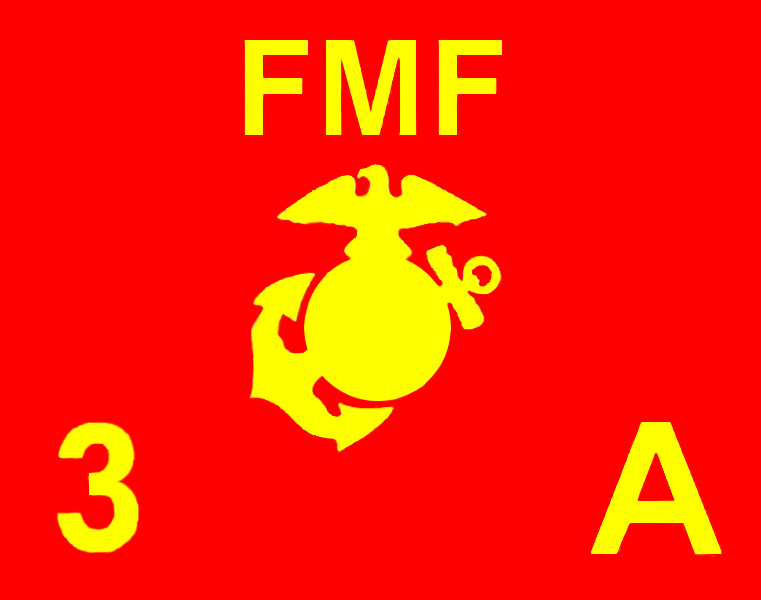
Guidon of Alpha Company, 1st Battalion, 3rd Marine Regiment

==== Department of the Air Force ====
Flag of the Secretary of the Air Force

Flag of the Under Secretary of the Air Force

Flag of the General Counsel of the Department of the Air Force

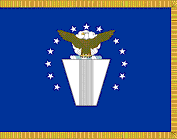
Flag of the Air Force Senior Executive Service

===== Air Force =====
Flag of the Air Force

Flag of the Chief of Staff of the Air Force

Flag of the Vice Chief of Staff of the Air Force

Flag of a General of the Air Force

Flag of an Air Force general

Flag of an Air Force lieutenant general

Flag of an Air Force major general

Flag of an Air Force brigadier general

Flag of the Chief Master Sergeant of the Air Force

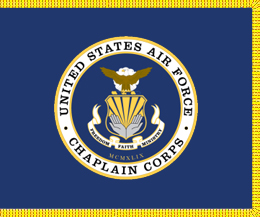
Flag of the Air Force Chaplain Corps

===== Space Force =====
Flag of the Space Force

Flag of Space Operations Command

Flag of Space Systems Command

Flag of Space Training and Readiness Command

Flag of the Chief of Space Operations

Flag of the Vice Chief of Space Operations

Flag of a Space Force general

Flag of a Space Force lieutenant general

Flag of a Space Force major general

Flag of a Space Force brigadier general

Flag of the Chief Master Sergeant of the Space Force

==== National Guard Bureau ====
Flag of the Chief of the National Guard Bureau

Flag of the Vice Chief of the National Guard Bureau

Flag of the Air National Guard

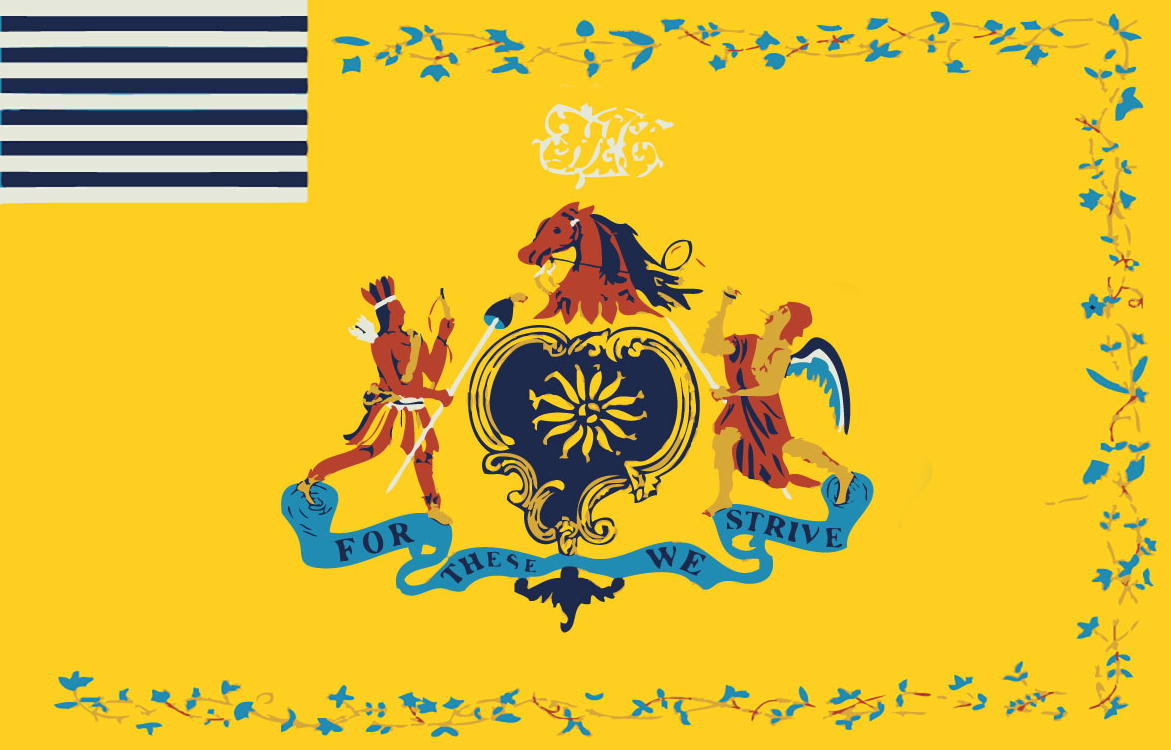
Flag of the First Troop Philadelphia City Cavalry

===== Civil Air Patrol =====
The Civil Air Patrol (CAP) is a congressionally chartered, federally supported non-profit corporation that serves as the official civilian auxiliary of the U.S. Air Force. It has quasi-military organizational and rank structures modeled on those of the Air Force.

Flag of the Civil Air Patrol

Flag of the National Commander of the Civil Air Patrol
(major general)

Flag of the National Vice Commander of the Civil Air Patrol
(brigadier general)

=== Department of Justice ===
Flag of the Department of Justice

Flag of the Attorney General

Flag of the Associate Attorney General

Flag of the Solicitor General

Flag of an Assistant Attorney General

Flag of a United States Attorney

Flag of the Drug Enforcement Administration

Flag of the Federal Bureau of Investigation

Flag of the Marshals Service

Flag of the Bureau of Prisons

Flag of the Bureau of Alcohol, Tobacco, Firearms and Explosives

=== Department of the Interior ===
Flag of the Department of the Interior

Flag of the Secretary of the Interior

Flag of the Deputy Secretary of the Interior

Flag of the National Park Service

Guidon of the National Park Service

Flag of the Bureau of Indian Affairs

Flag of the Fish and Wildlife Service

Flag of the Bureau of Land Management

Flag of the Geological Survey

=== Department of Agriculture ===
Flag of the Department of Agriculture

Flag of the Secretary of Agriculture

Flag of the Forest Service

=== Department of Commerce ===
Flag of the Department of Commerce

Flag of the Secretary of Commerce

Flag of the Deputy Secretary of Commerce

Flag of Under Secretaries in the Department of Commerce

Flag of the Head of a Department of Commerce Primary Operating Unit

==== National Oceanic and Atmospheric Administration ====
Flag of the National Oceanic and Atmospheric Administration

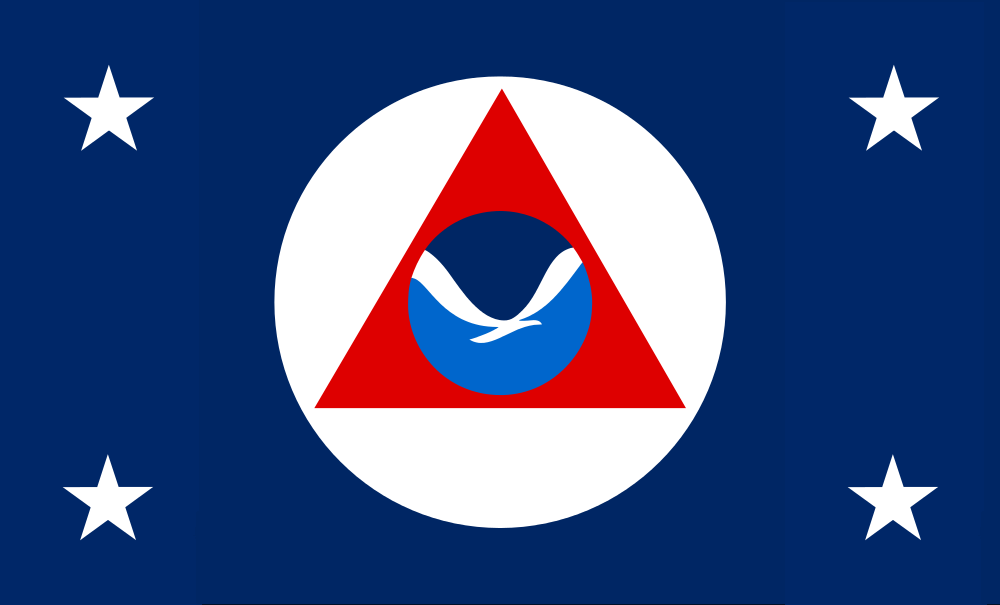
Flag of the Administrator of the National Oceanic and Atmospheric Administration

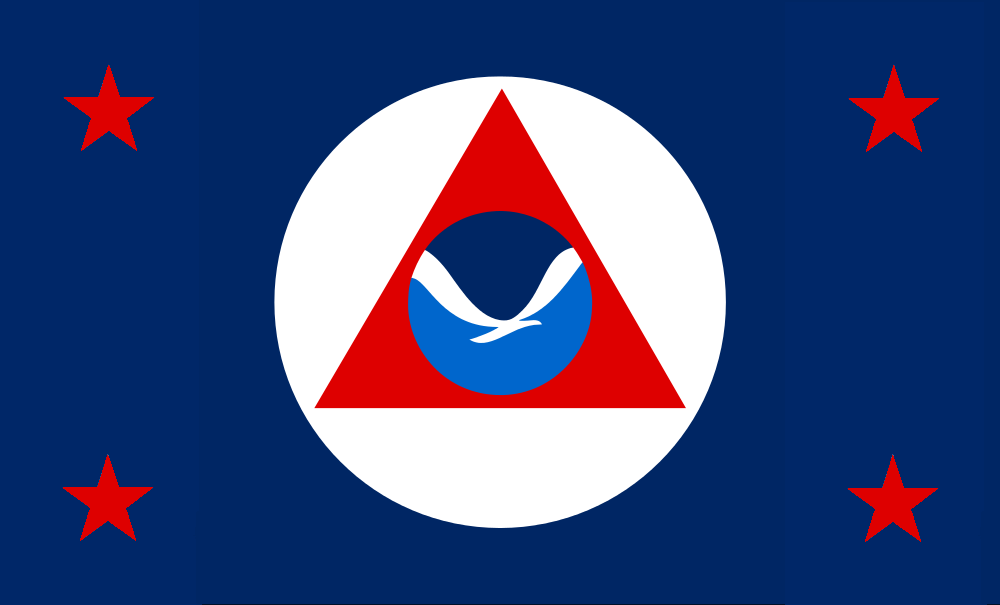
Flag of the Deputy Administrator of the National Oceanic and Atmospheric Administration

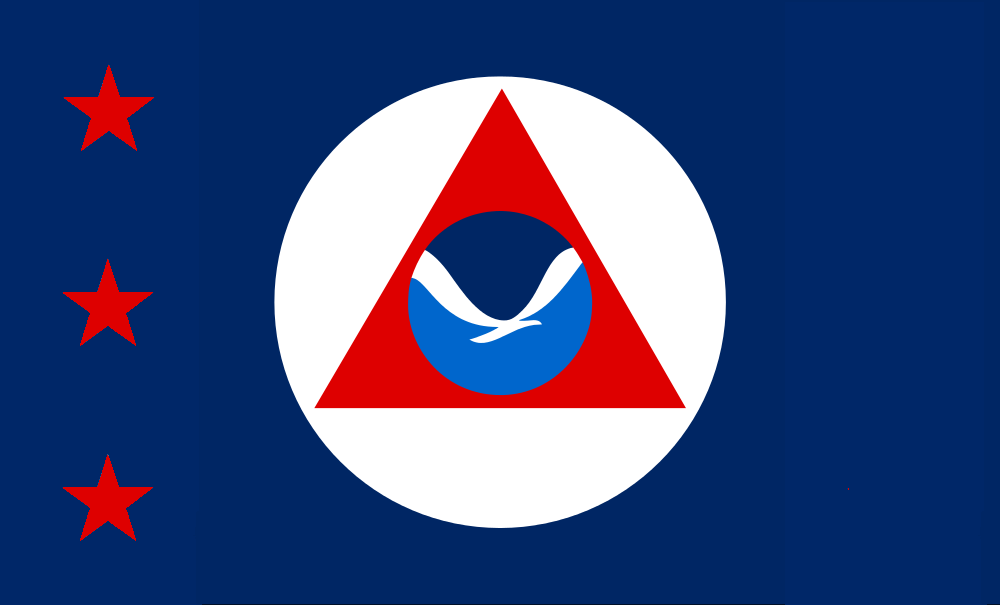
Flag of an Associate Administrator of the National Oceanic and Atmospheric Administration

==== National Oceanic and Atmospheric Administration Commissioned Officer Corps ====
Flag of the National Oceanic and Atmospheric Administration Commissioned Officer Corps

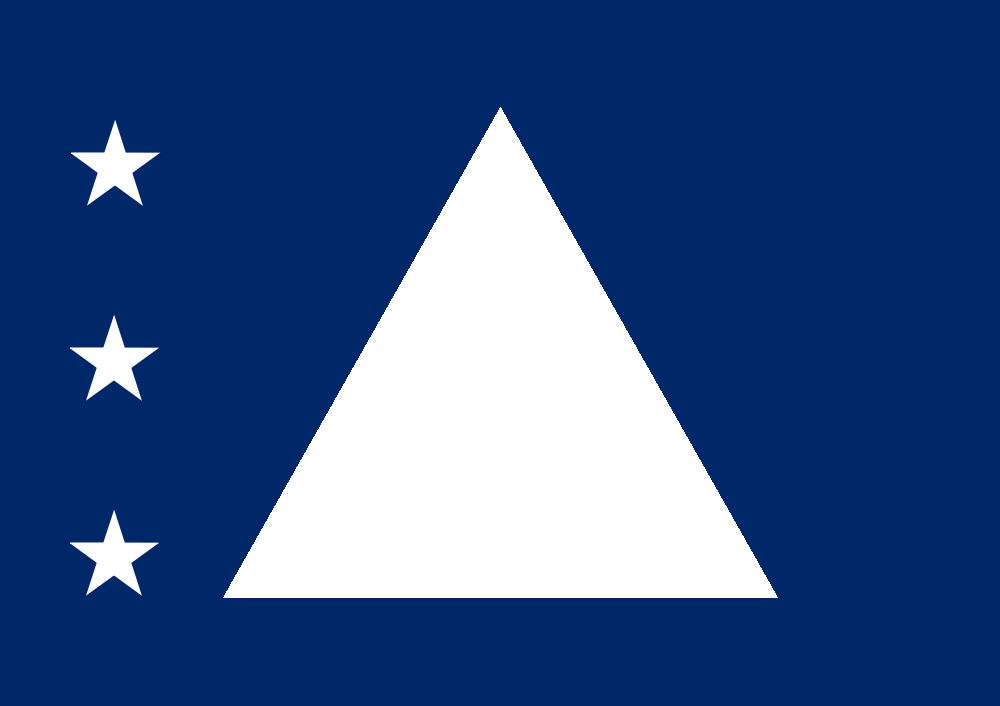
Flag of a National Oceanic and Atmospheric Administration Commissioned Officer Corps
vice admiral

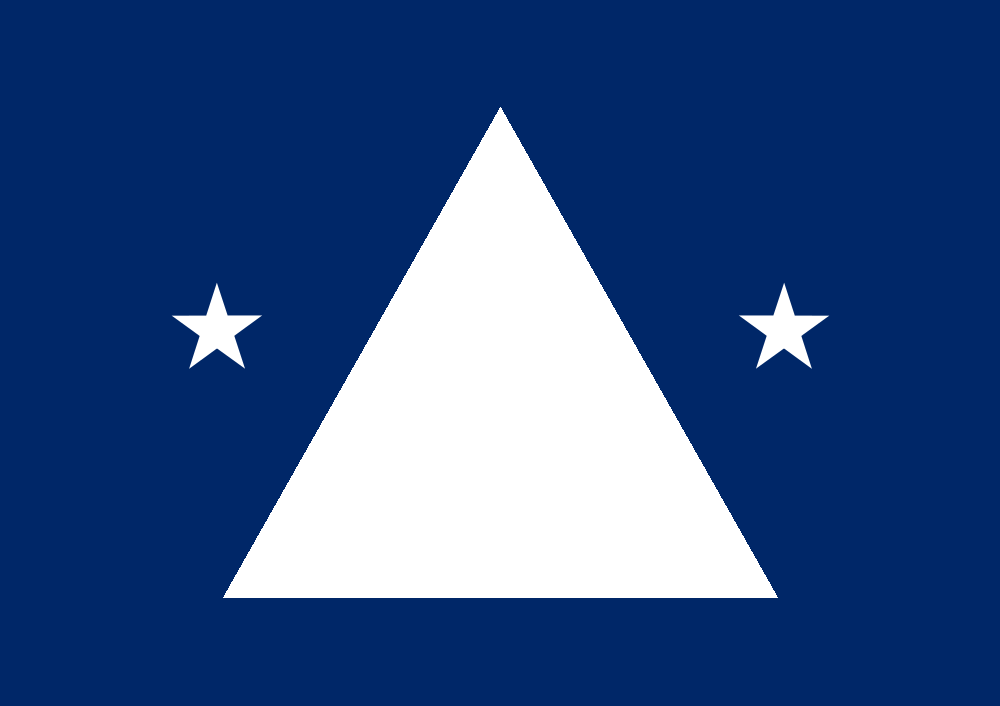
Flag of a National Oceanic and Atmospheric Administration Commissioned Officer Corps
rear admiral

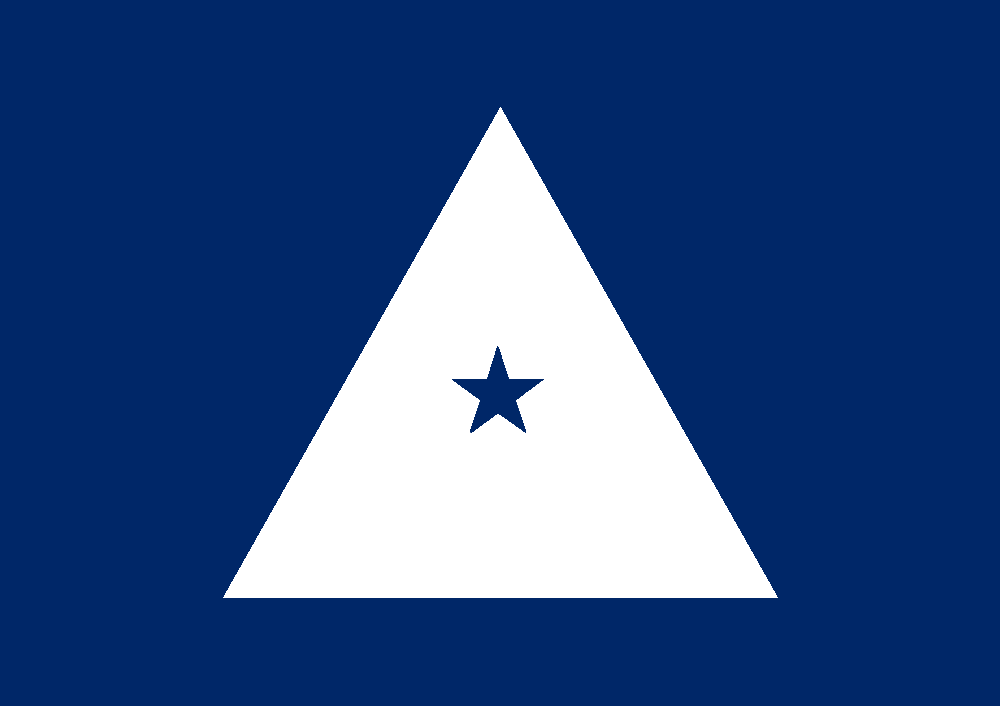
Flag of a National Oceanic and Atmospheric Administration Commissioned Officer Corps
rear admiral (lower half)

=== Department of Labor ===
Flag of the Department of Labor

Flag of the Secretary of Labor

=== Department of Health and Human Services ===
Flag of the Department of Health and Human Services

Flag of the Secretary of Health and Human Services

Flag of the Principal Deputy Assistant Secretary for Health

Flag of the United States Public Health Service

==== United States Public Health Service Commissioned Corps ====
Flag of the Assistant Secretary for Health
(admiral)

Flag of the Surgeon General of the United States
(vice admiral)

Flag of the Deputy Surgeon General
(rear admiral)

Flag of a 2-star Assistant Surgeon General
(rear admiral)

Flag of a 1-star Assistant Surgeon General
(rear admiral (lower half))

=== Department of Housing and Urban Development ===
Flag of the Department of Housing and Urban Development

=== Department of Transportation ===
Flag of the Department of Transportation

Flag of the Secretary of Transportation

Flag of the Deputy Secretary of Transportation

Flag of an Assistant Secretary of Transportation

Flag of the Federal Aviation Administration

Flag of the Maritime Administration

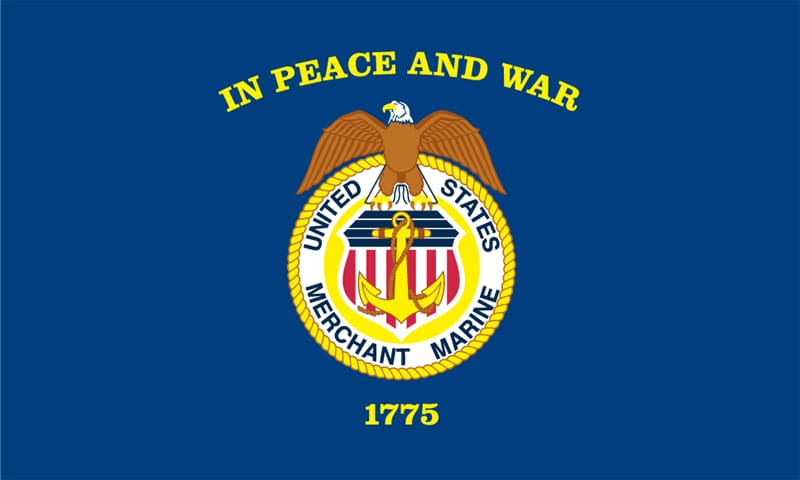
Flag of the Merchant Marine

=== Department of Energy ===
Flag of the Department of Energy

Flag of the Secretary of Energy

=== Department of Education ===
Flag of the Department of Education

Flag of the Secretary of Education

=== Department of Veterans Affairs ===
Flag of the Department of Veterans Affairs

Flag of the Secretary of Veterans Affairs

Flag of the Deputy Secretary of Veterans Affairs

Flag of the Under Secretaries of Veterans Affairs for Health, Benefits, and Memorial Affairs

Flag of the Director of the National Cemetery System

Flag of an Assistant Secretary of Veterans Affairs

=== Department of Homeland Security ===
Flag of Homeland Security

Flag of the Secretary of Homeland Security

Flag of the Deputy Secretary of Homeland Security

Flag of Customs and Border Protection

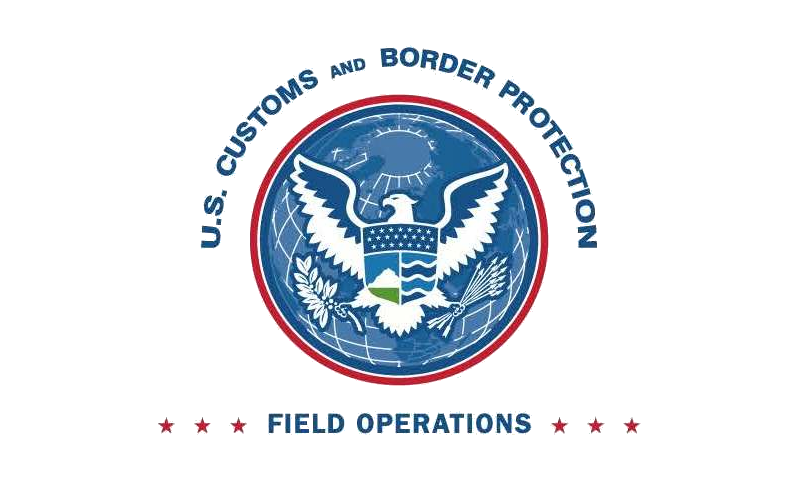
Flag of the CBP Office of Field Operations

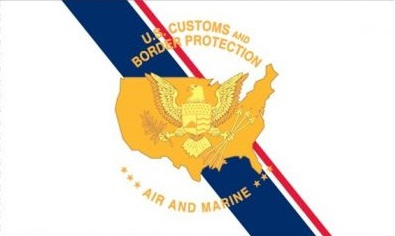
Flag of the CBP Air and Marine Operations

Flag of the Cybersecurity and Infrastructure Security Agency

Flag of Immigration and Customs Enforcement

Flag of the Border Patrol

Flag of the Secret Service

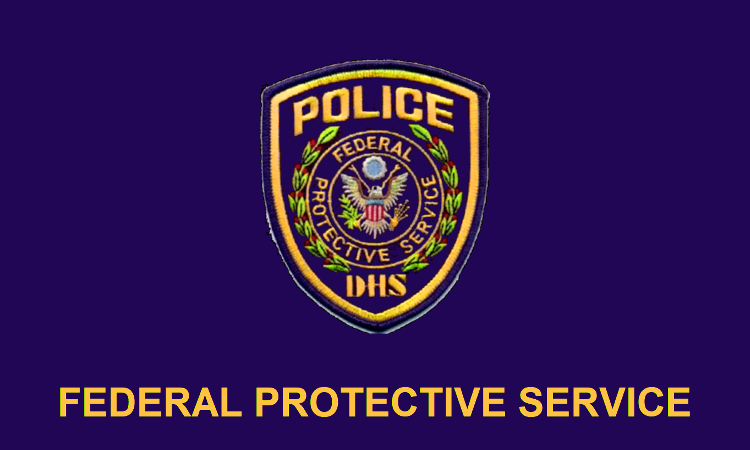
Flag of the Federal Protective Service

Flag of the Transportation Security Administration

==== Coast Guard ====
Flag of the Coast Guard

Guidon of the Coast Guard

Ensign of the Coast Guard

Flag of the Coast Guard Auxiliary

Flag of the Commandant of the Coast Guard

Flag of the Vice Commandant of the Coast Guard

Flag of a Coast Guard admiral

Flag of a Coast Guard vice admiral

Flag of a Coast Guard rear admiral

Flag of a Coast Guard rear admiral (lower half)

== Legislative branch flags ==
=== Congress ===
Flag of the Senate

Flag of the House of Representatives

Flag of the Capitol Police

Flag of the Library of Congress

Flag of the Government Accountability Office

== Other federal flags ==
Many agencies, departments, and offices of the U.S. federal government have their own flags, guidons, or standards. Following traditional American vexillology, these usually consist of the agency's departmental seal on a blank opaque background, but not always.

Flag of the Central Intelligence Agency

Flag of the Environmental Protection Agency

Flag of the Federal Reserve

Flag of the Federal Trade Commission

Flag of the National Aeronautics and Space Administration

Flag of the National Science Foundation

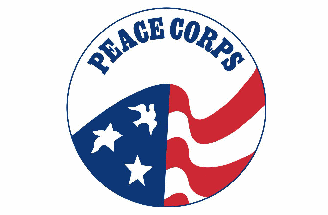
Flag of the Peace Corps

Flag of the Securities and Exchange Commission

Flag of the Senior Executive Service

Flag of the Smithsonian Institution

Flag of the Social Security Administration

Flag of the Tennessee Valley Authority

Flag of the Intelligence Community

Flag of the United States Postal Inspection Service

Flag of the United States Chemical Safety and Hazard Investigation Board

Flag of the United States Postal Service Office of Inspector General

Flag of the Federal Communications Commission

Flag of the Supreme Court of the United States

== State and territory flags ==
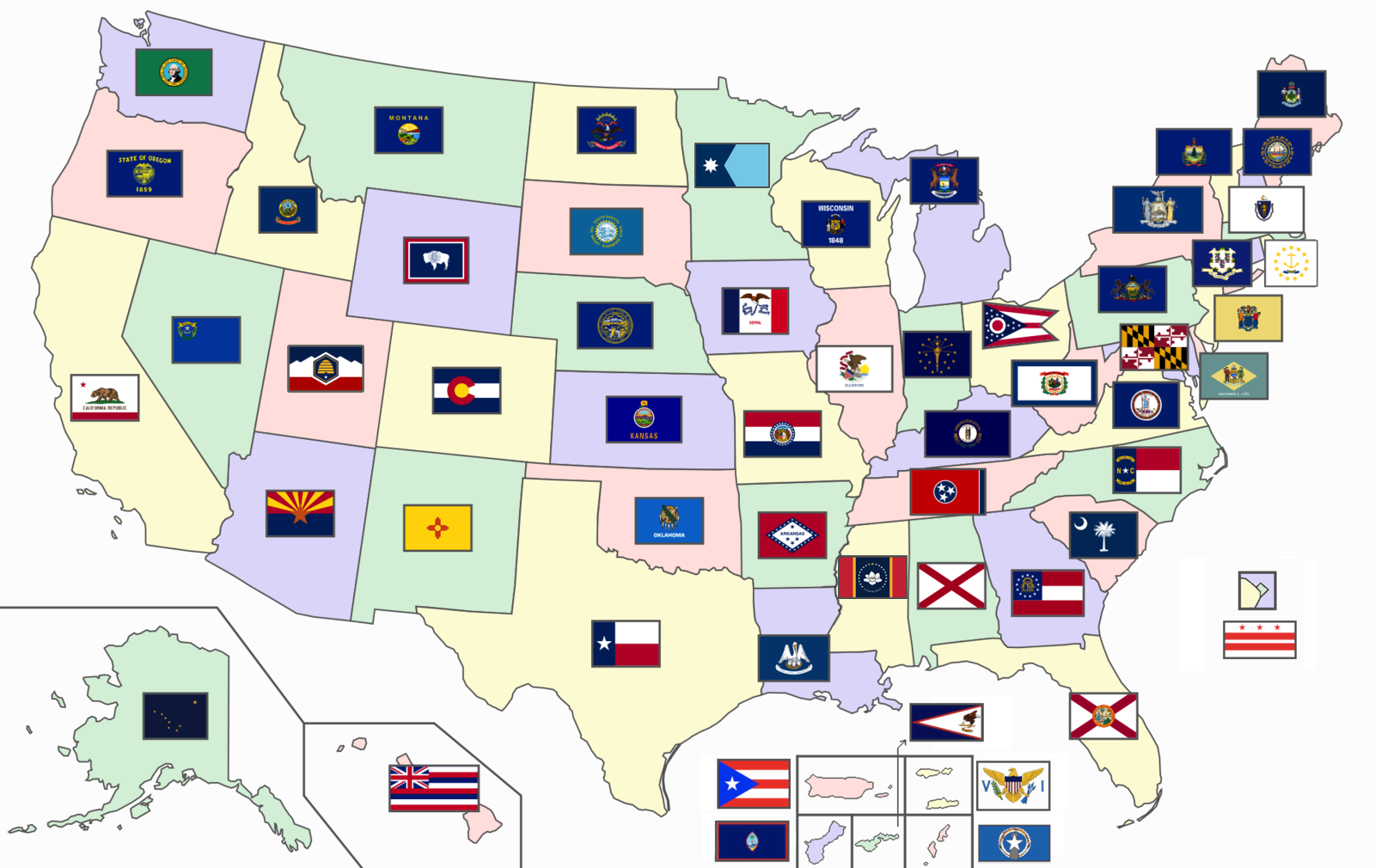
Map showing the flags of the 50 U.S. states, the District of Columbia, and the five inhabited U.S. territories

The flags of the U.S. states, territories, and federal district exhibit a variety of regional influences and local histories, as well as different styles and design principles. Nonetheless, the majority of the states' flags share the same design pattern consisting of the state seal superimposed on a monochrome background, commonly every different shade of blue, which remains a source of criticism from vexillologists.

The most recent current state flag is that of Minnesota (May 11, 2024), while the most recent current territorial flag is that of the Northern Mariana Islands (July 1, 1985).

=== History ===
Modern U.S. state flags date from the 1890s, when states wanted to have distinctive symbols at the 1893 World's Columbian Exposition in Chicago, Illinois. Most U.S. state flags were designed and adopted between 1893 and World War I.

According to a 2001 survey by the North American Vexillological Association, New Mexico has the best-designed flag of any U.S. state, U.S. territory, or Canadian province, while Georgia's state flag was rated the worst design. (Georgia adopted a new flag in 2003; Nebraska's state flag, whose design was rated second worst, remains in use to date.)

=== Current state flags ===
Dates in parentheses denote when the current flag was adopted by the state's legislature.

Flag of Alabama
(February 16, 1895)

Flag of Alaska
(May 2, 1927)

Flag of Arizona
(February 27, 1917)

Flag of Arkansas
(April 5, 2011)

Flag of California
(June 14, 1953)

Flag of Colorado
(March 31, 1964)

Flag of Connecticut
(September 9, 1897)

Flag of Delaware
(July 24, 1913)

Flag of Florida
(May 21, 1985)

Flag of Georgia
(February 19, 2003)

Flag of Hawaii
(December 29, 1845)

Flag of Idaho
(March 1957)

Flag of Illinois
(September 17, 1969)

Flag of Indiana
(1955)

Flag of Iowa
(March 29, 1921)

Flag of Kansas
(September 24, 1961)

Flag of Kentucky
(March 26, 1918)

Flag of Louisiana
(November 22, 2010)

Flag of Maine
(February 23, 1909)

Flag of Maryland
(March 9, 1904)

Flag of Massachusetts
(July 3, 1971)

Flag of Michigan
(August 1, 1911)

Flag of Minnesota
(May 11, 2024)

Flag of Mississippi
(January 11, 2021)

Flag of Missouri
(March 22, 1913)

Flag of Montana
(July 1, 1981)

Flag of Nebraska
(July 16, 1963)

Flag of Nevada
(March 26, 1929)

Flag of New Hampshire
(1931)

Flag of New Jersey
(May 11, 1896)

Flag of New Mexico
(March 19, 1925)

Flag of New York
(April 2, 1901)

Flag of North Carolina
(March 9, 1885)

Flag of North Dakota
(March 11, 1911)

Flag of Ohio
(May 9, 1902)

Flag of Oklahoma
(April 2, 1925)

Flag of Oregon (obverse)
(April 15, 1925)

Flag of Oregon (reverse)

Flag of Pennsylvania
(June 13, 1907)

Flag of Rhode Island
(November 1, 1897)

Flag of Rhode Island (fringed)

Flag of South Carolina
(January 26, 1861)

Flag of South Dakota
(November 9, 1992)

Flag of Tennessee
(April 17, 1905)

Flag of Texas
(January 25, 1839)

Flag of Utah
(March 9, 2024)

Flag of Vermont
(June 1, 1923)

Flag of Virginia
(March 28, 1912)

Flag of Washington
(March 5, 1923)

Flag of West Virginia
(March 7, 1929)

Flag of Wisconsin
(May 1, 1981)

Flag of Wyoming
(January 31, 1917)

=== Current federal district flag ===
Flag of the District of Columbia
(federal district)

=== Current inhabited territory flags ===
Flag of American Samoa
(unincorporated unorganized territory)

Flag of Guam
(unincorporated organized territory)

Flag of the Northern Mariana Islands
(unincorporated organized territory with Commonwealth status)

Flag of Puerto Rico
(unincorporated organized territory with Commonwealth status)

Flag of the U.S. Virgin Islands
(unincorporated organized territory)

=== Unofficial flags of United States Minor Outlying Islands ===
The U.S. national flag is the official flag for all islands, atolls, and reefs composing the United States Minor Outlying Islands. However, unofficial flags are sometimes used to represent some of these insular areas:

Flag of Johnston Atoll

Flag of the Midway Islands

Flag of Wake Island

== County flags ==
Flag of Alameda County, California

Flag of Allegheny County, Pennsylvania

Flag of Bronx County, New York

Flag of Kings County, New York

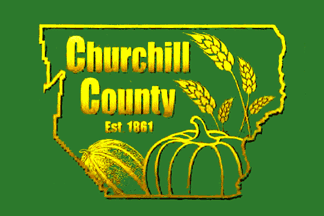
Flag of Churchill County, Nevada

Flag of Collin County, Texas

Flag of Cook County, Illinois

Flag of Cuyahoga County, Ohio

Flag of Dallas County, Texas

Flag of Fairfax County, Virginia

Flag of Franklin County, Ohio

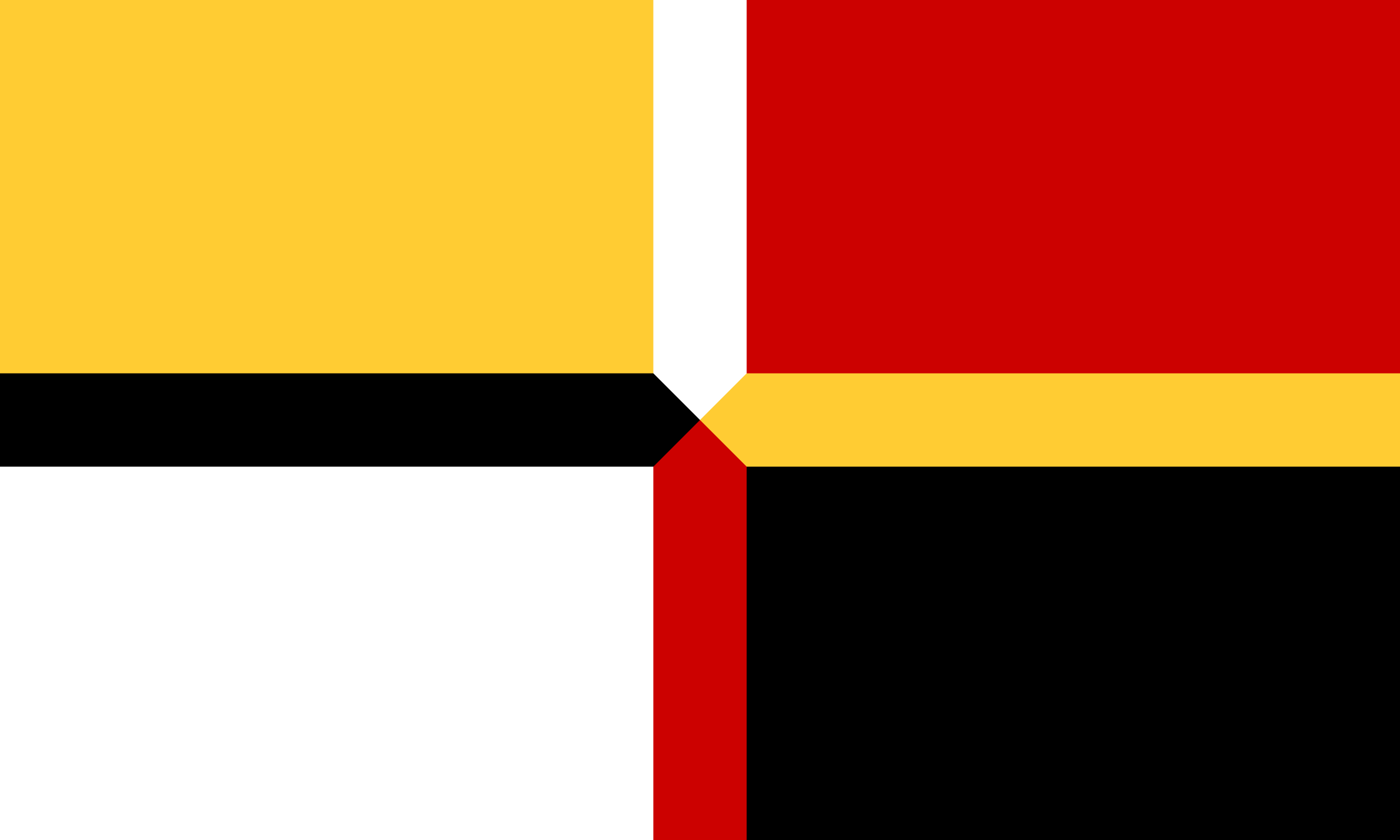
Flag of Frederick County, Maryland

Flag of Fulton County, Georgia

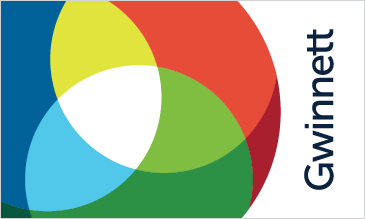
Flag of Gwinnett County, Georgia

Flag of Hennepin County, Minnesota

Flag of Hillsborough County, Florida

Flag of Honolulu County, Hawaii

Flag of Kent County, Delaware

Flag of Los Angeles County, California

Flag of Loudoun County, Virginia

Flag of Maricopa County, Arizona

Flag of Maui County, Hawaii

Flag of Miami-Dade County, Florida

Flag of Montgomery County, Maryland

Flag of New Castle County, Delaware

Flag of Oakland County, Michigan

Flag of Orange County, California

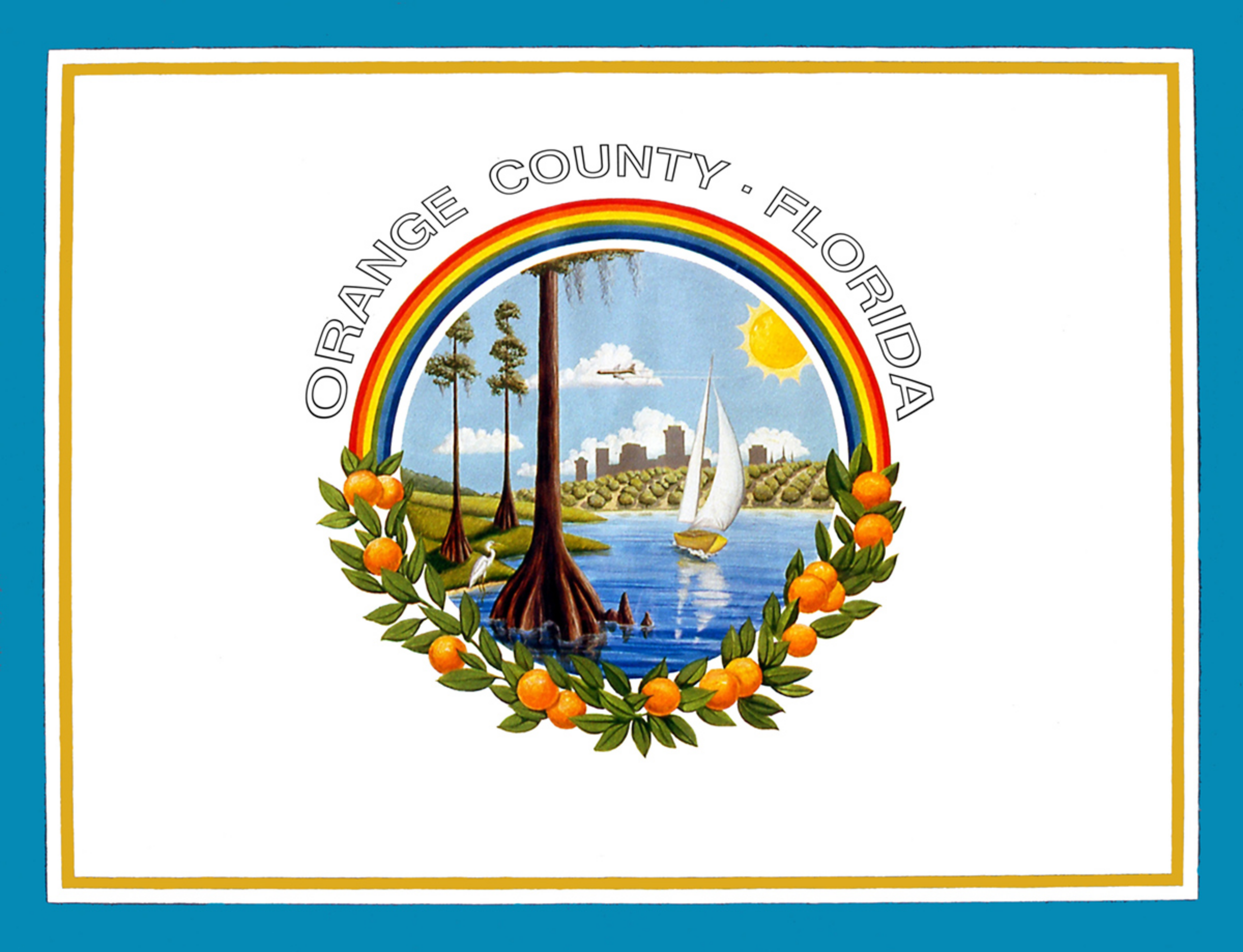
Flag of Orange County, Florida

Flag of Palm Beach County, Florida

Flag of Prince George's County, Maryland

Flag of Queens County, New York

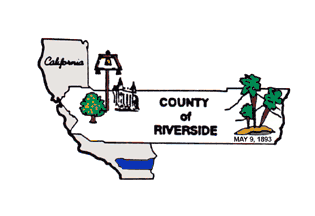
Flag of Riverside County, California

Flag of Sacramento County, California

Flag of San Bernardino County, California

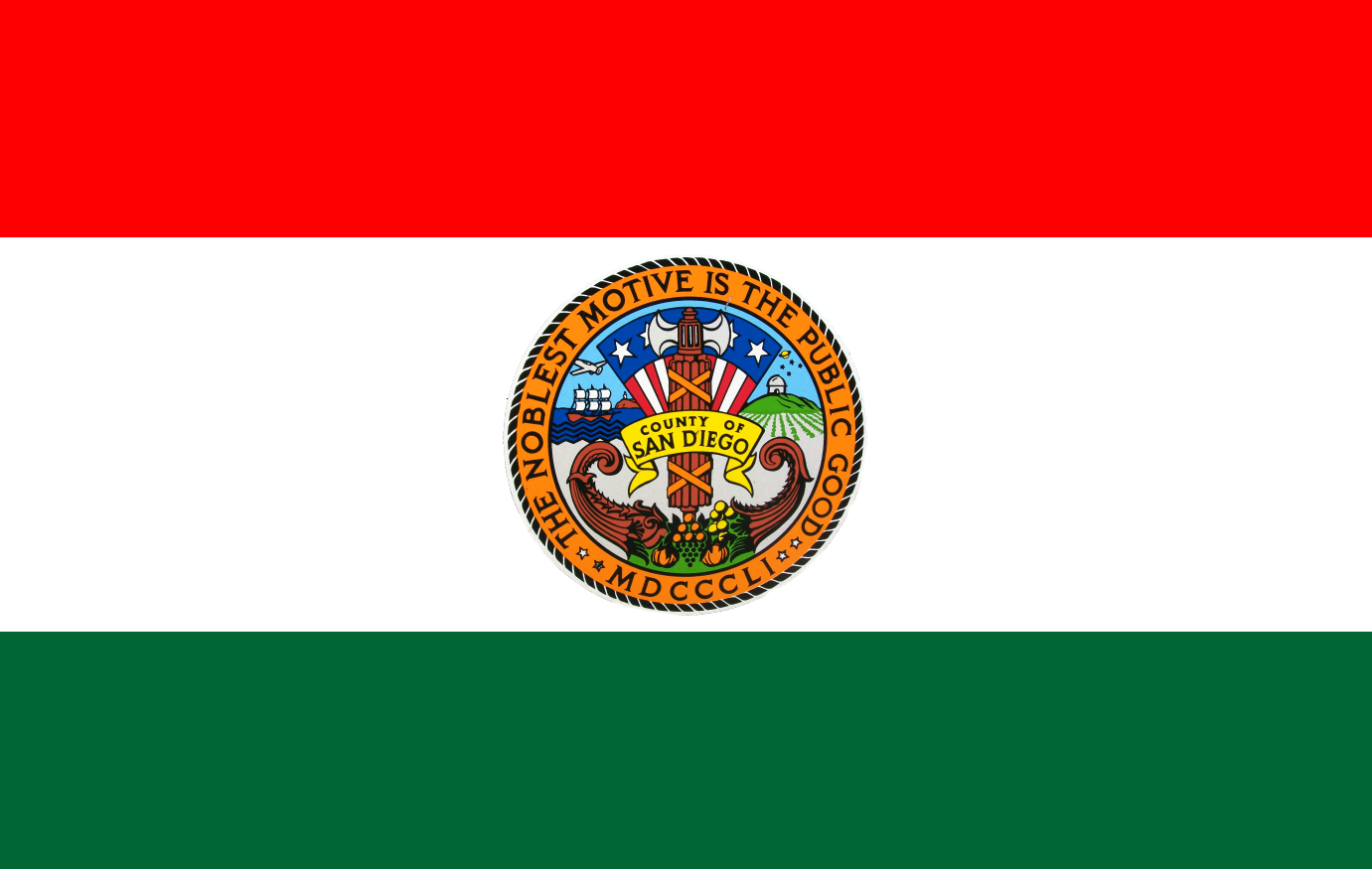
Flag of San Diego County, California

Flag of Santa Clara County, California

Flag of St. Louis County, Missouri

Flag of Sussex County, Delaware

Flag of Tarrant County, Texas

Flag of New York County, New York

Flag of Travis County, Texas

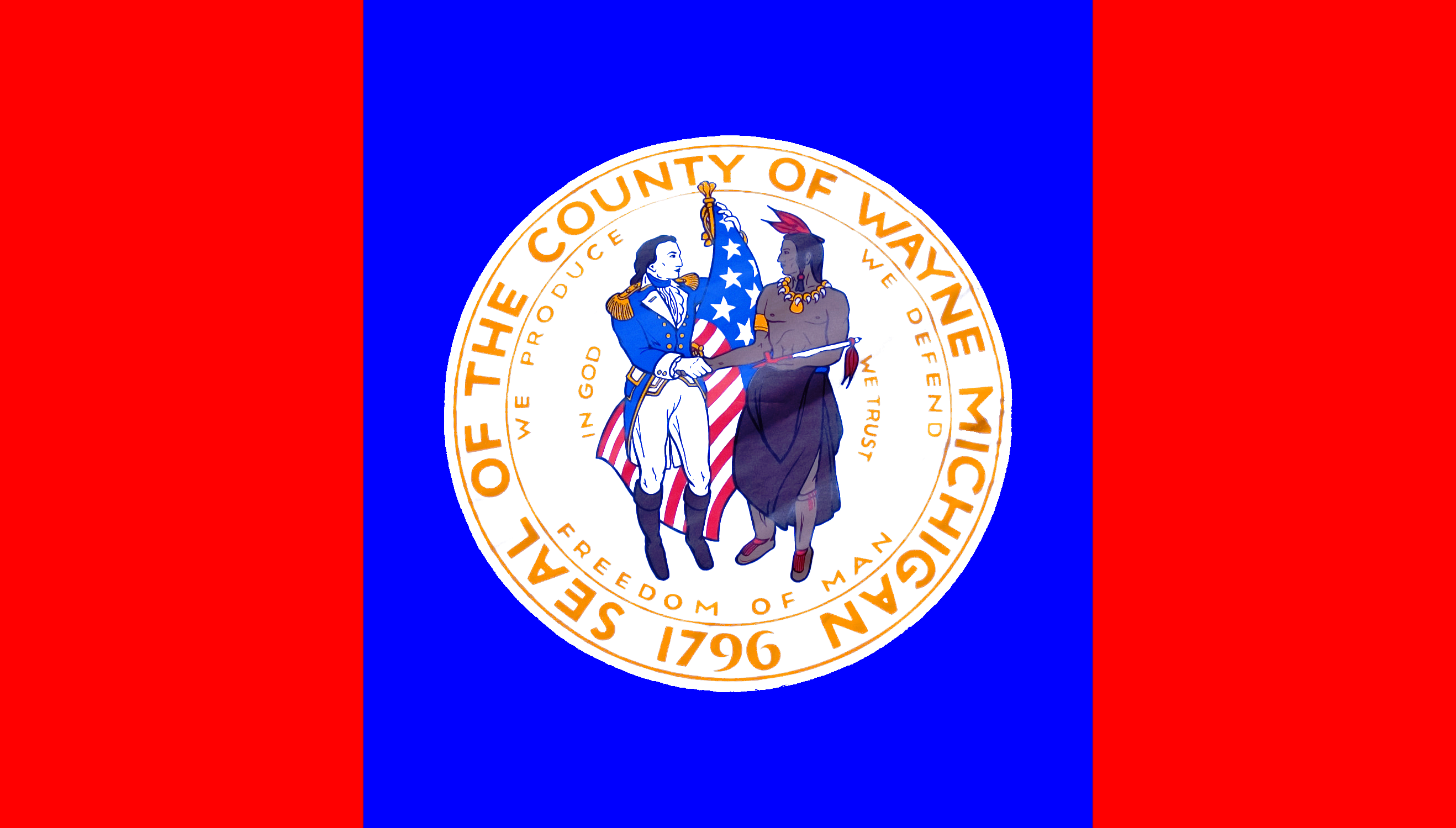
Flag of Wayne County, Michigan

Flag of Westchester County, New York

== City flags ==
Flag of Albuquerque

Flag of Anchorage

Flag of Atlanta

Flag of Austin

Flag of Baltimore

Flag of Boston

Flag of Buffalo

Flag of Charlotte

Flag of Chicago

Flag of Cincinnati

Flag of Cleveland

Flag of Columbus

Flag of Dallas

Flag of Denver

Flag of Des Moines

Flag of Detroit

Flag of El Paso

Flag of Honolulu

Flag of Houston

Flag of Indianapolis

Flag of Jacksonville

Flag of Kansas City

Flag of Las Vegas

Flag of Los Angeles

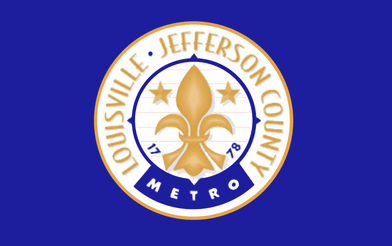
Flag of Louisville

Flag of Memphis

Flag of Miami

Flag of Milwaukee

Flag of Minneapolis

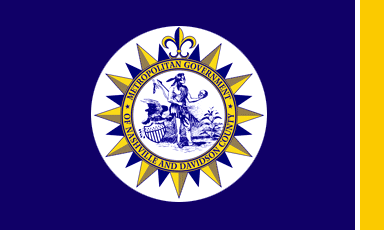
Flag of Nashville

Flag of New Orleans

Flag of New York

Flag of Oakland

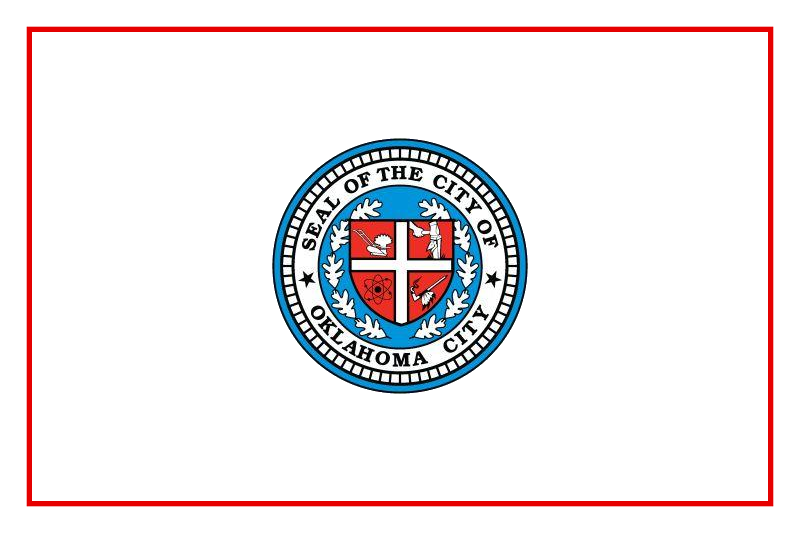
Flag of Oklahoma City

Flag of Orlando

Flag of Omaha

Flag of Philadelphia

Flag of Phoenix

Flag of Pittsburgh

Flag of Portland

Flag of Reno

Flag of Raleigh

Flag of Sacramento

Flag of Salt Lake City

Flag of San Antonio

Flag of San Diego

Flag of San Francisco

Flag of San Jose

Flag of San Juan

Flag of Saint Paul, Minnesota

Flag of St. Louis

Flag of Tampa

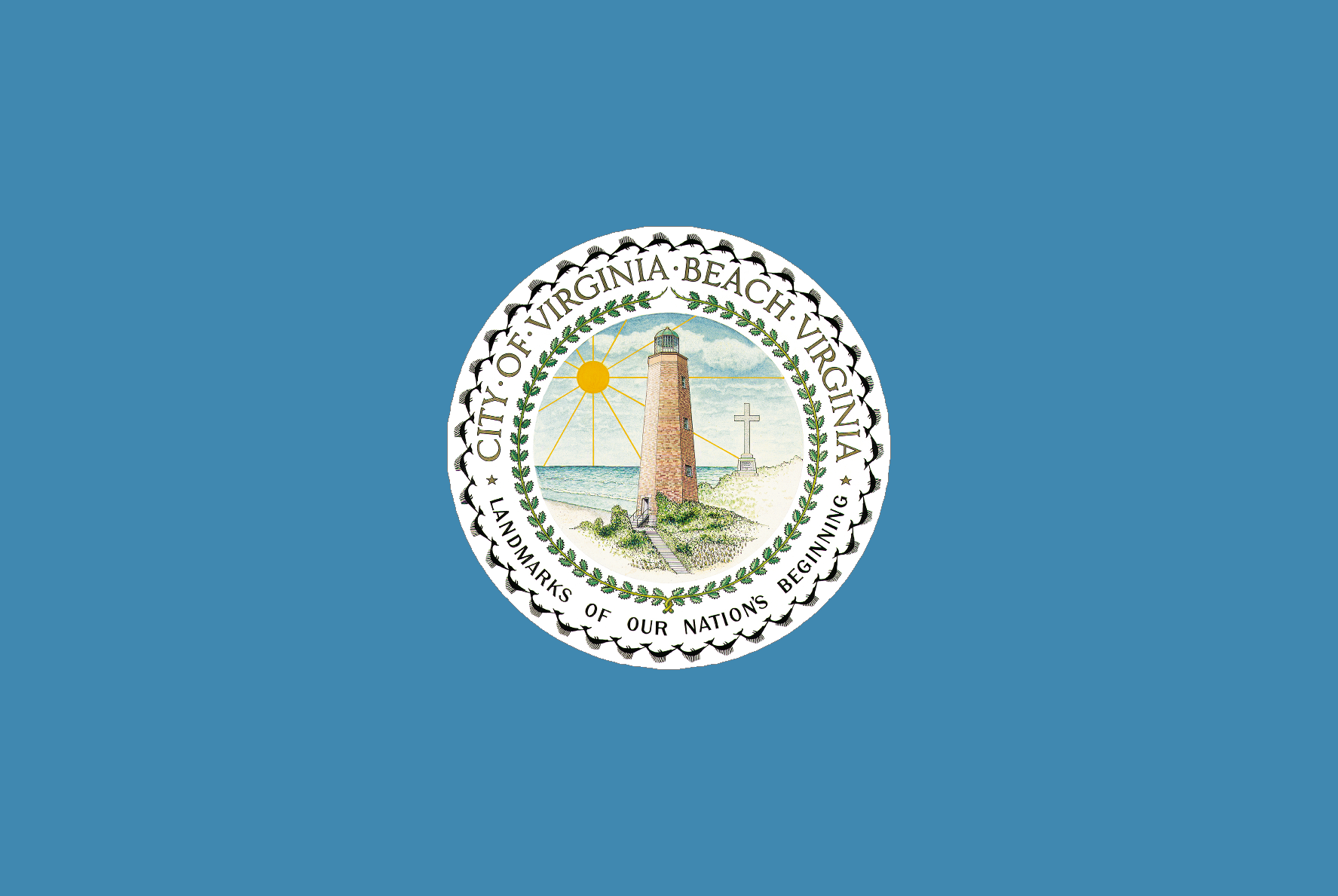
Flag of Virginia Beach

Flag of Wichita

== Maritime flags ==
=== Ensigns ===
==== National ====
Since 1777, the national ensign of the United States has also simultaneously served as its national flag. The current version is shown below; for previous versions, please see the section Historical progression of designs above.

Ensign of the United States (1960–present)

==== States ====
Naval and Maritime Flag of Massachusetts

Merchant and Marine Flag of Maine

==== Other ====
Ensign of the Coast Guard

Ensign of the Power Squadrons

Yacht ensign

===== Jacks =====
Union Jack (state jack, 2002–present; naval and state jack, 1960–2002, 2019–present)

First Navy Jack (naval jack for all warships 1975–1976 & 2002–2019; for oldest commissioned warship 1980–present)

Naval Jack (circa 1776)

=== Distinctive marks ===
Distinctive mark of the National Oceanic and Atmospheric Administration

=== Commissioning pennants ===
Commissioning pennant of the United States Navy

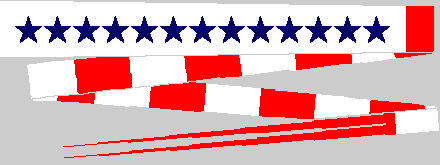
Commissioning pennant of the United States Coast Guard

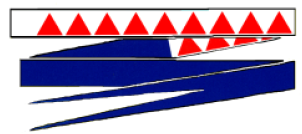
Commissioning pennant of the National Oceanic and Atmospheric Administration for Class I vessels

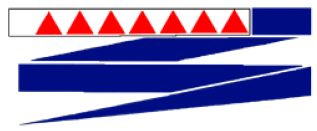
Commissioning pennant of the National Oceanic and Atmospheric Administration for Class II, III, and IV vessels

== Native American tribal flags ==
Flag of the Arapaho

Flag of the Cherokee Nation

Flag of the Chickasaw Nation

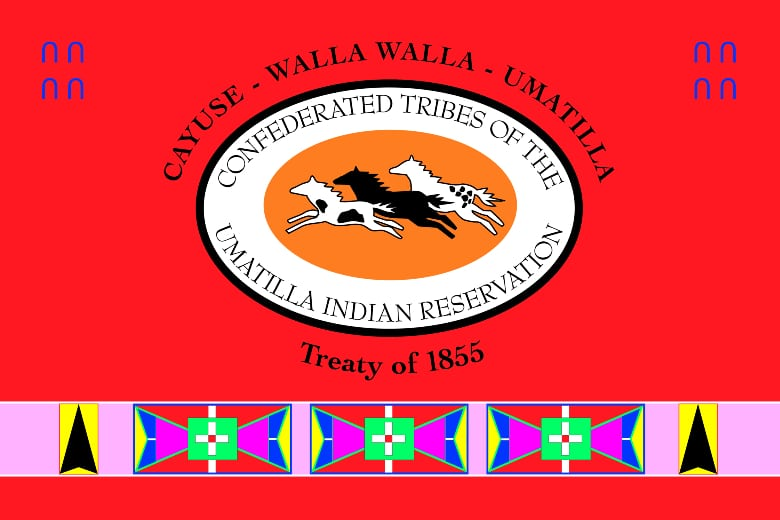
Flag of the Confederated Tribes of the Umatilla Reservation

Flag of Chinook Nation

Flag of the Choctaw Nation

Flag of the Colorado River Indian Tribes

Flag of the Iroquois Confederacy

Flag of Miccosukee

Flag of the Navajo Nation

Flag of the Ninilchik Village Tribe

Flag of the Northern Cheyenne Tribe

Flag of the Oglala Sioux Tribe (Pine Ridge Indian Reservation)

Flag of the Osage Nation

Flag of Pascua Yaqui Tribe

Flag of Robinson Rancheria of Pomo Indians of California

Flag of the Sac and Fox Tribe of the Mississippi in Iowa

Flag of The Zia Pueblo

Flag of Viejas Group of Capitan Grande Band of Mission Indians

== Associated state flags ==
While the countries mentioned are recognized independent nations with United Nations seats, the United States maintains and exercises jurisdictional control over the countries in defense, security, and funding grants.

Marshall Islands

Micronesia

Palau

== Historical flags ==
=== Thirteen Colonies ===
Thirteen Colonies

=== American Revolutionary War ===
The Sons of Liberty Flag

Continental Union

Cowpens flag (circular)

Cowpens flag (oval)

Bennington flag

Betsy Ross flag

Hulbert flag

Brandywine flag

Easton Flag

Bedford Flag (1775)

George Rex Flag

George Rogers Clark Flag

Flag of New England

Serapis flag

Fort Mercer Flag

Gadsden flag

Moultrie Flag

Pine Tree Flag

French Alliance

Naval Ensign of New York (1775)

Schenectady Liberty Flag

=== Former federal flags ===
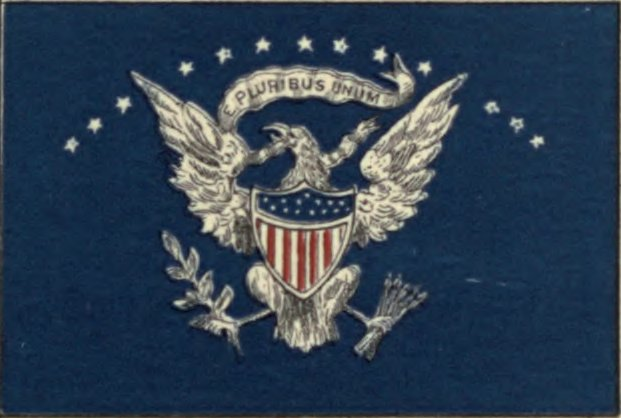
Flag of the President (1882)

Flag of the President (1899)

Flag of the President (1902)

Flag of the President (1916)

Flag of the President (1945)

Flag of the Vice President (1915)

Flag of the Vice President (1936)

Flag of the Vice President (1948)

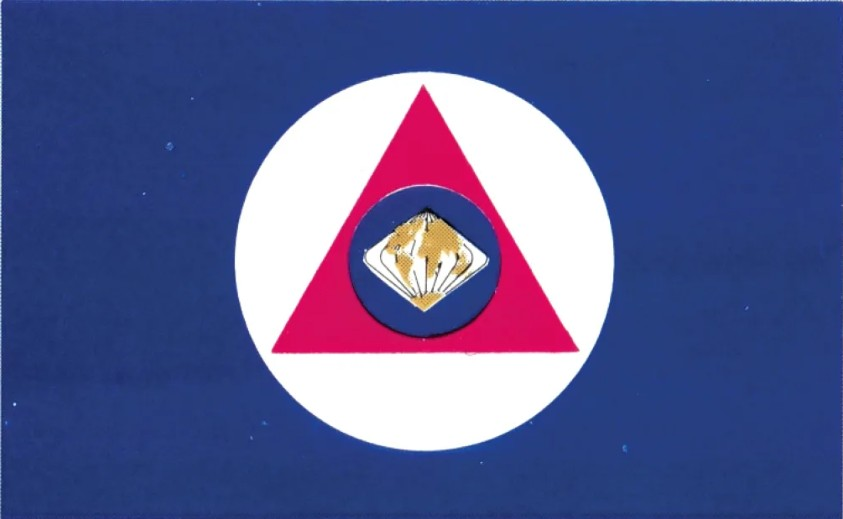
Flag of the Environmental Science Services Administration (1965–1970)

Flag of the Federal Emergency Management Agency (until 2003)

Flag of the Bureau of Alcohol, Tobacco, Firearms and Explosives (until 2003)

Flag of the Immigration and Naturalization Service

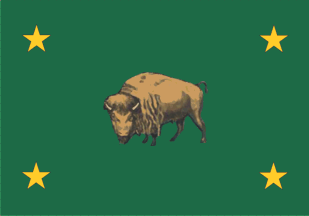
Flag of the Department of the Interior (until 1917)

Flag of the General Services Administration (1972–1973)

Flag of the General Services Administration (1973–1989)

Flag of the Secretary of the Interior (1917–1934)

Infantry Battalion flag (de facto flag of the U.S. Navy until 1959)

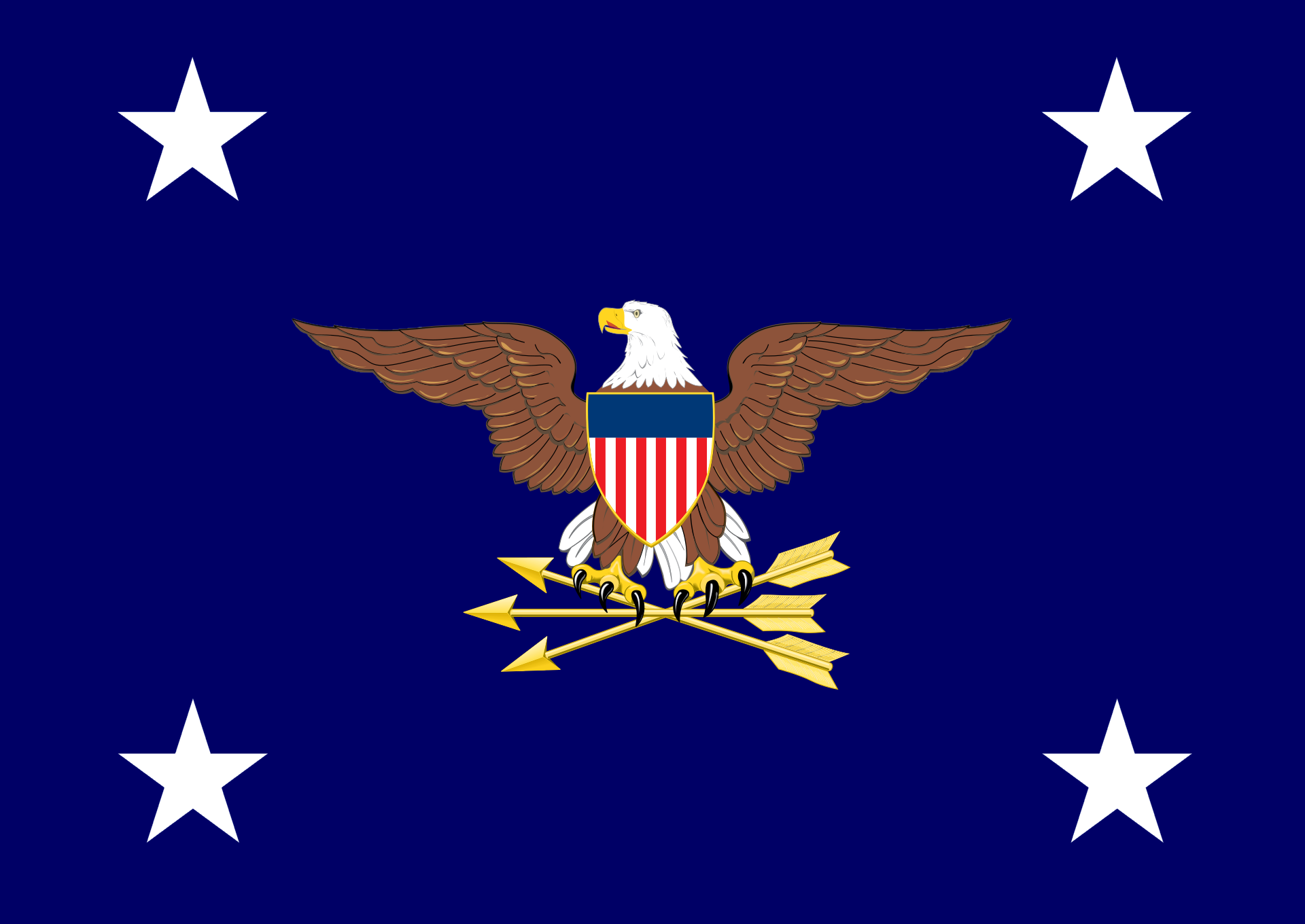
Flag of the Secretary of Defense (1947–1949)

Flag of the Secretary of Labor (1915–1960)

Flag of the Department of Labor (1915–1960)

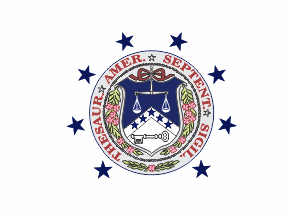
Flag of the Secretary of the Treasury (1887–1915)

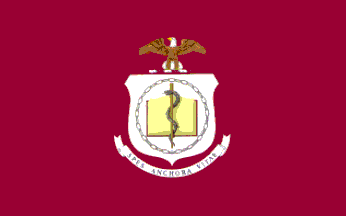
Flag of the Department of Health, Education, and Welfare

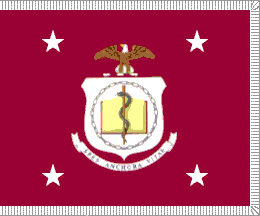
Flag of the Secretary of Health, Education, and Welfare

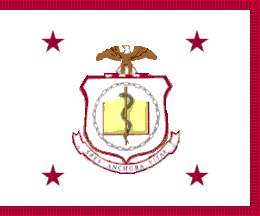
Flag of the Under Secretary of Health, Education and Welfare

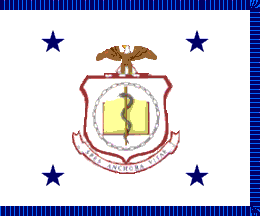
Flag of the Assistant Secretary of Health, Education and Welfare

Flag of the Public Health and Marine-Hospital Service

Flag of the Marine Hospital Service

Flag of the Bureau of Navigation (?–1946)

Flag of the Director of the Bureau of Marine Inspection and Navigation (?–1946)

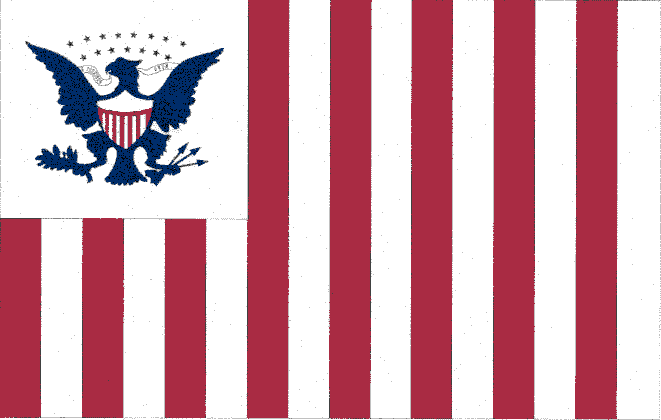
Ensign of the Revenue-Marine (1799)

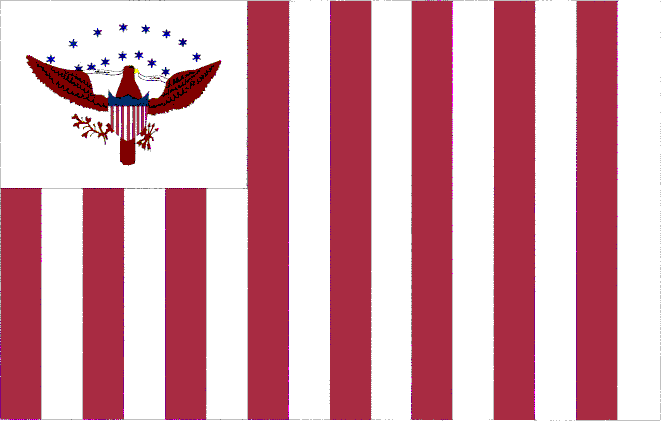
Ensign of the Revenue-Marine (1815)

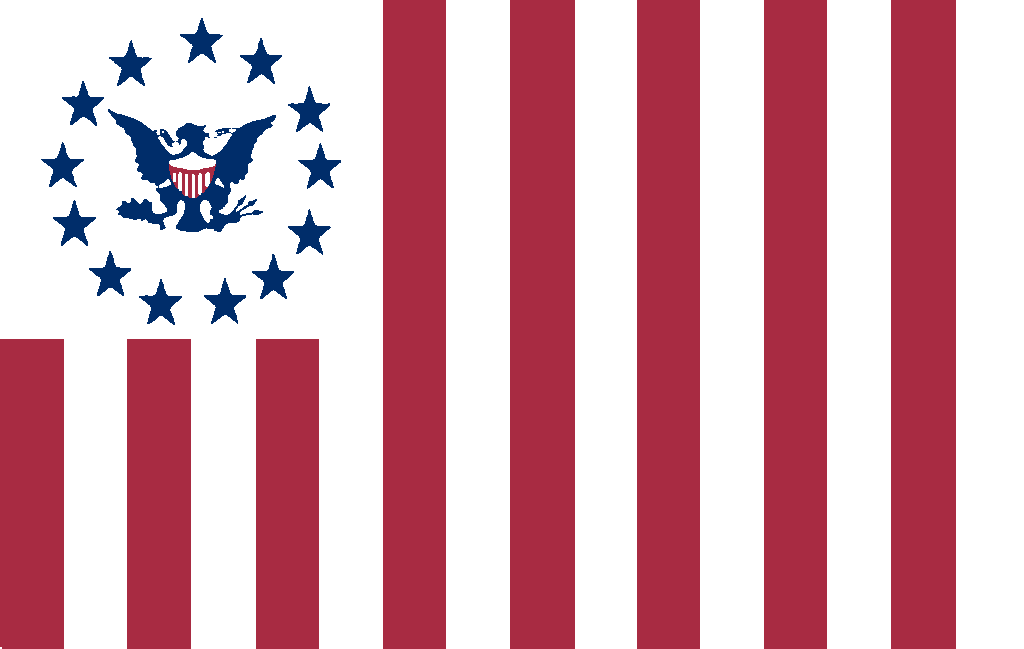
Ensign of the Revenue-Marine (1836)

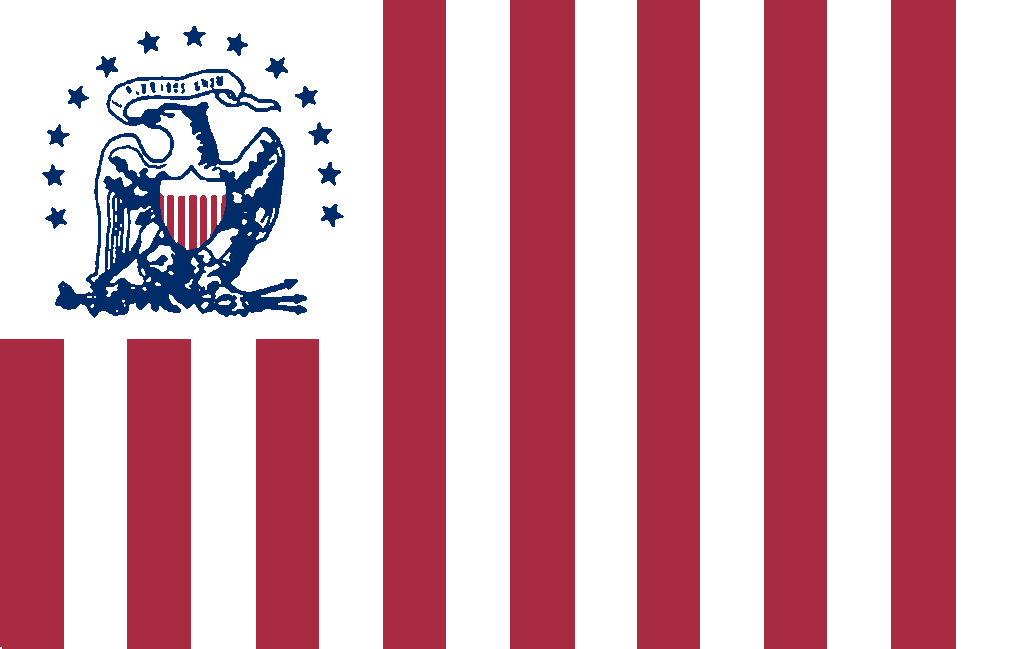
Ensign of the Revenue-Marine (1841)

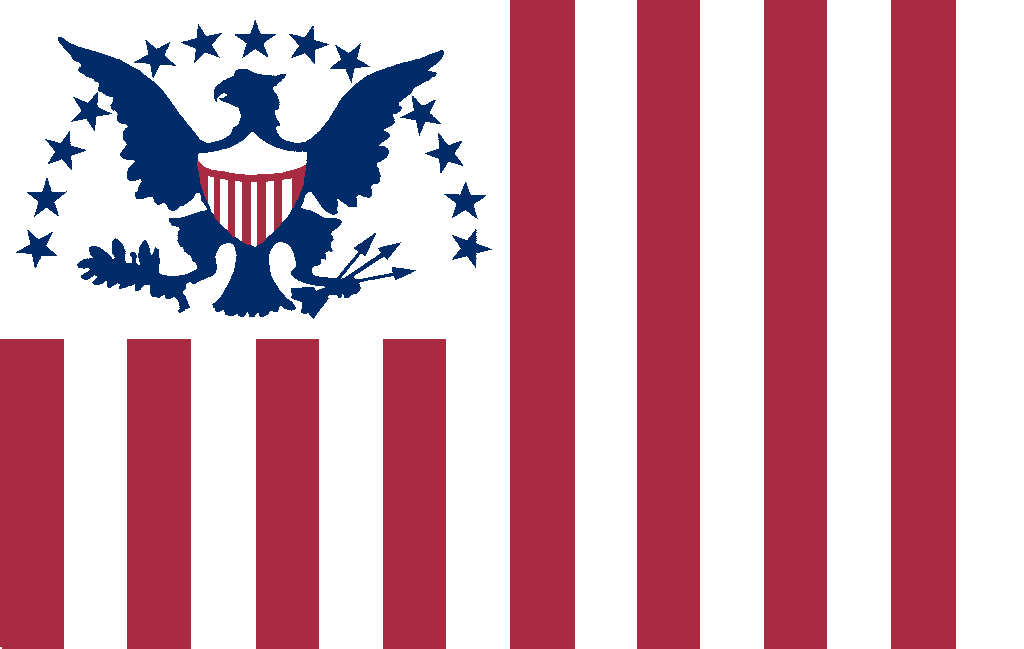
Ensign of the Revenue-Marine (1867)

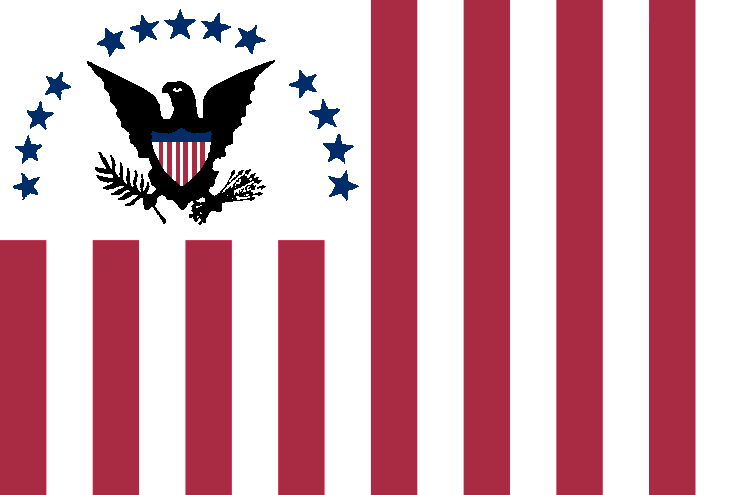
Ensign of the Revenue-Marine (1868)

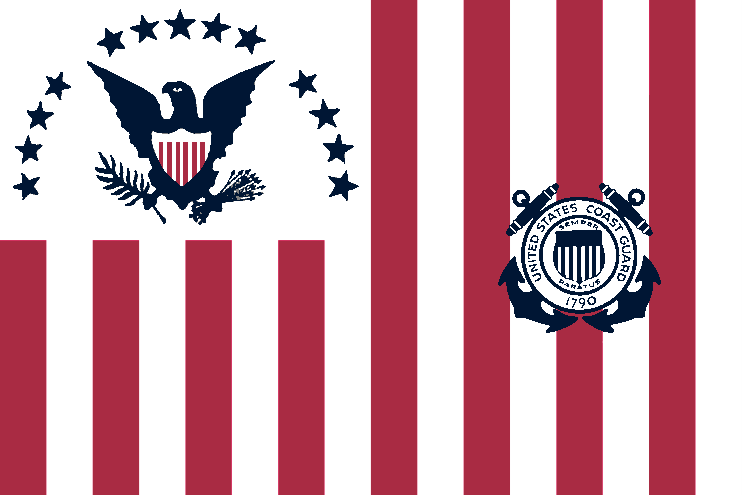
Ensign of the Coast Guard (1915–1953)

Flag of the Coast Guard Auxiliary (1940–1968)

Flag of the Office of Homeland Security (2001–2002)

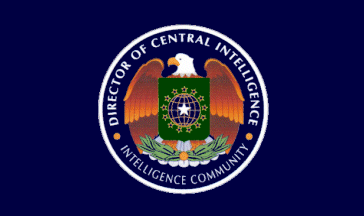
Flag of the Director of Central Intelligence

Flag of the National Imagery and Mapping Agency

Boat flag (1912–1916)

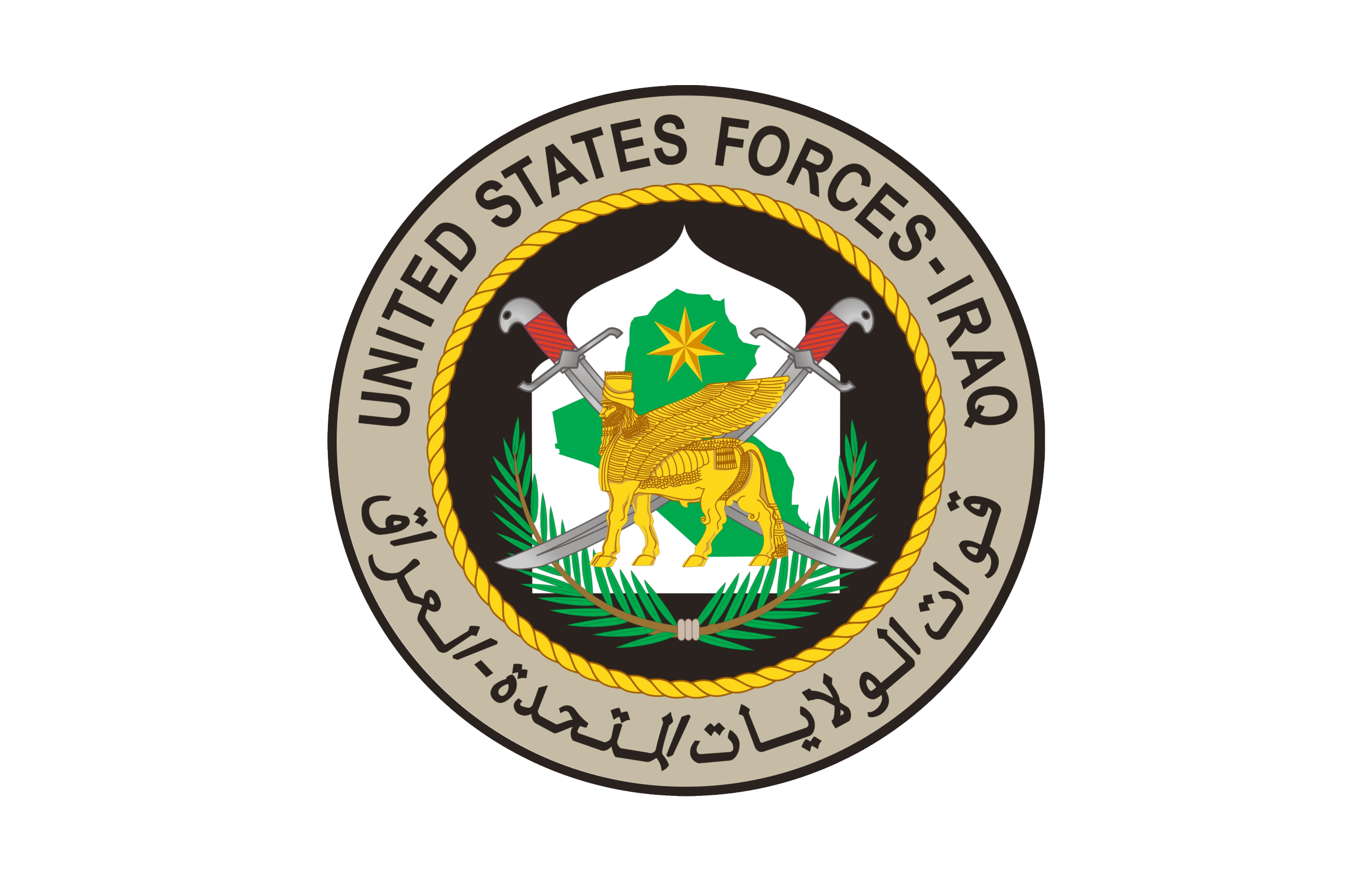
Flag of U.S. Forces – Iraq (2010–2011)

Flag of the United States Bureau of Fisheries (?–1940)

Flag of the Commissioner of Fisheries (?–1940)

Flag of the United States Fish and Wildlife Service (1949–1989)

Flag of the United States Coast and Geodetic Survey (1899–1970)

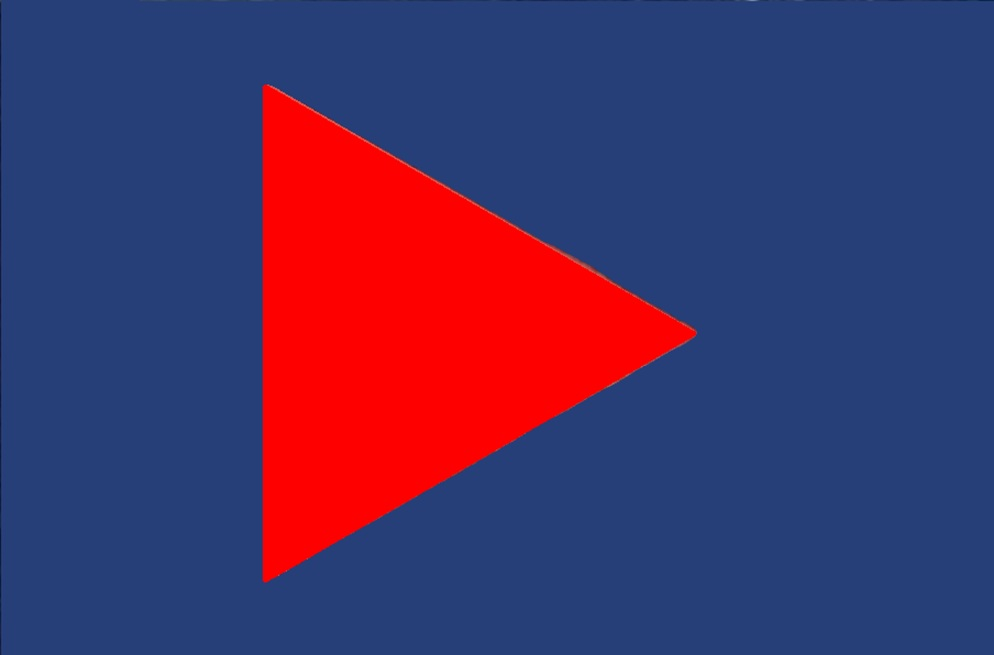
Flag of the Superintendent of the United States Coast and Geodetic Survey (1899)

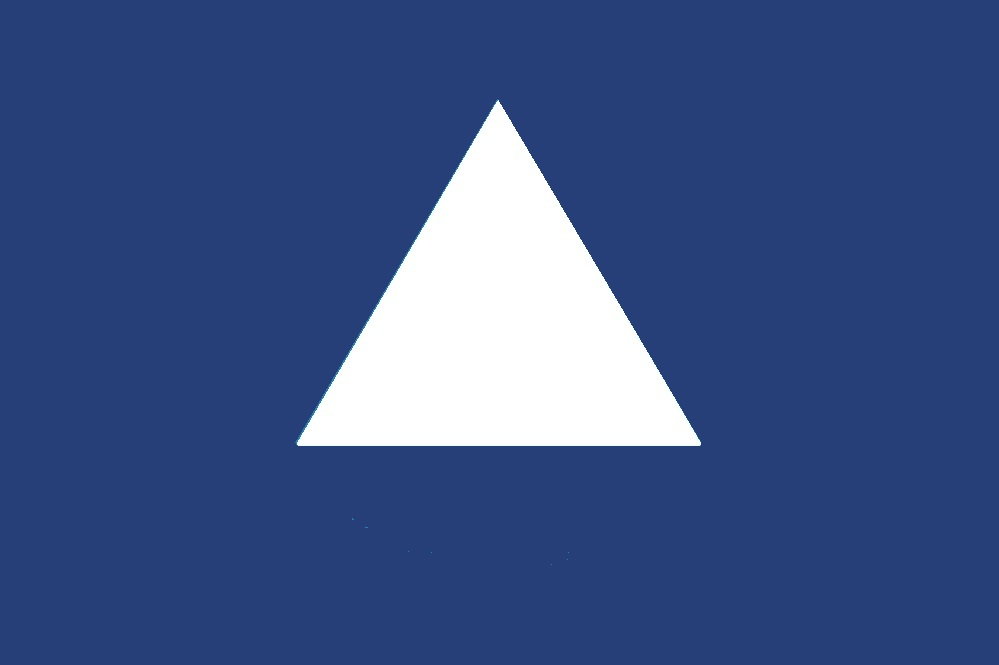
Flag of the Director of the United States Coast and Geodetic Survey (ca. 1925)

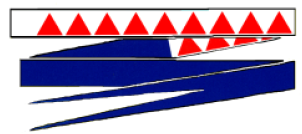
Commissioning pennant of the United States Coast and Geodetic Survey for Class I vessels ( ? –1970)

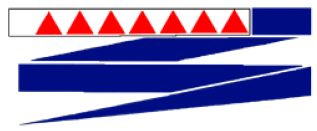
Commissioning pennant of the United States Coast and Geodetic Survey for Class II, III, and IV vessels ( ? –1970)

Pennant of the
United States Life-Saving Service
(?–1915)

Pennant of the United States Lighthouse Service
(?–1939)

Flag of the Commissioner of Lighthouses
(?–1939)

Flag of the Superintendent of Lighthouses
(?–1939)

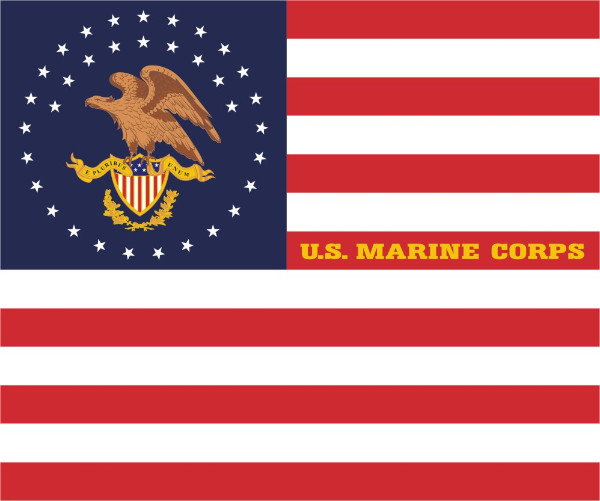
Flag of the Marine Corps
(1861–1863)

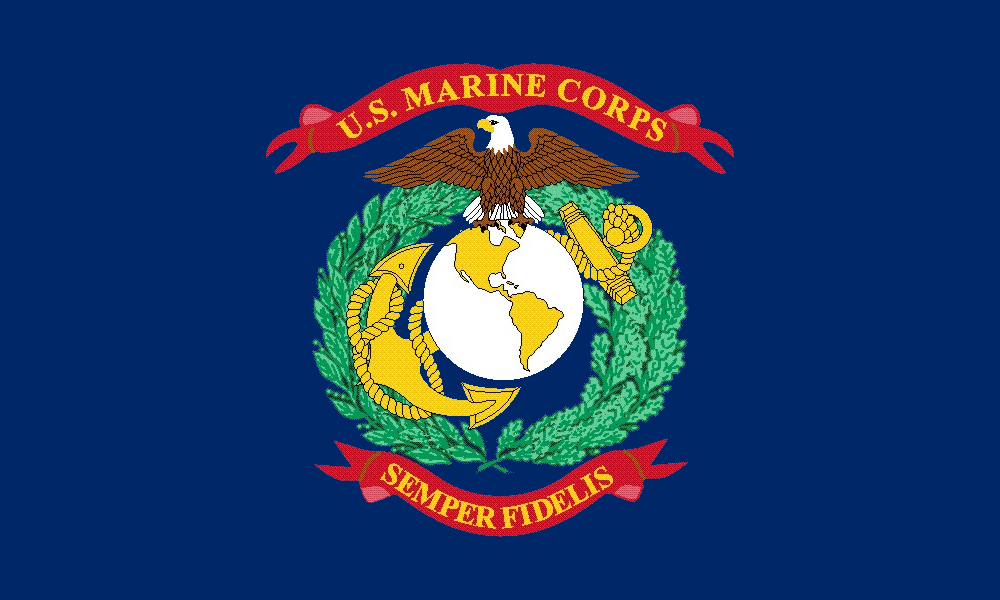
Flag of the Marine Corps
(1914–1939)

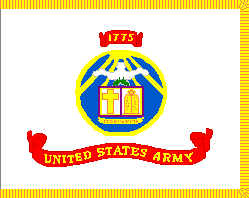
Flag of the Chief of Chaplains of the United States Army

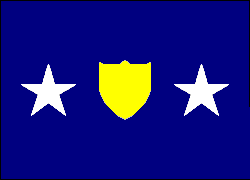
Flag of the United States Army Adjutant General's Corps

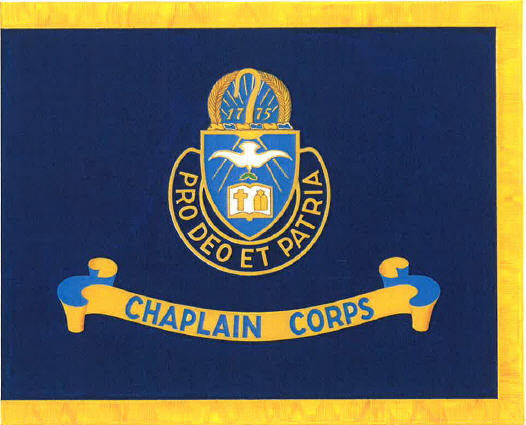
Flag of the United States Army Chaplain Corps (1983–1993)

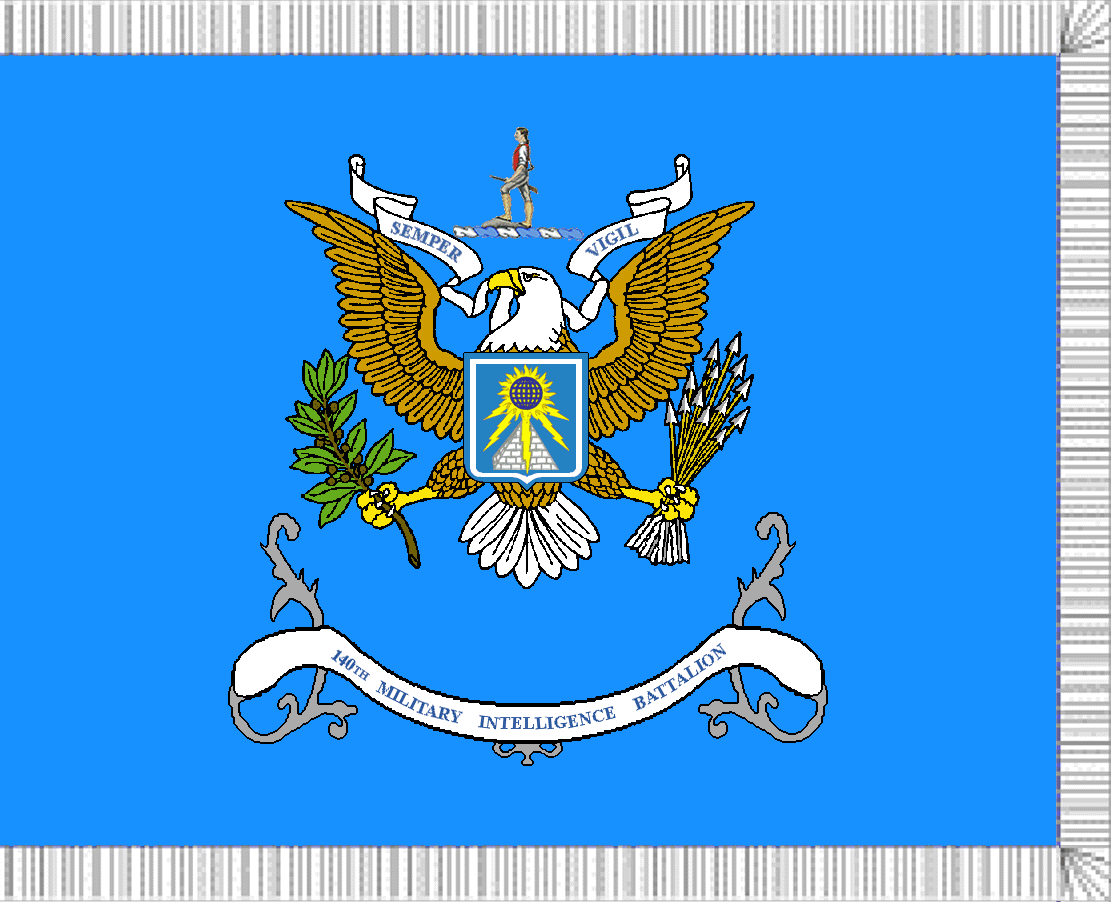
Flag of the 140th Military Intelligence Battalion

Fort Sumter Flag (1861)

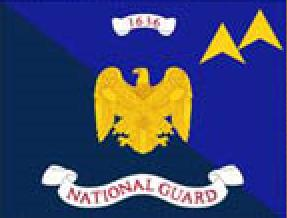
Flag of the Chief of the National Guard Bureau (1998-2008)

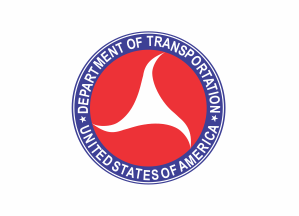
Flag of the Department of Transportation (1967–1980)

=== Other states ===
Flag of the Green Mountain Boys

Texas Come and Take It flag

Flag of the California Republic

Flag of the Republic of West Florida (1810)

Flag of the Choctaw Republic (1860)

J.P Gillis Flag (California)

Alamo flag (Texas)

Flag of the 20th Maine Volunteer Infantry Regiment

Flag of the 8th California Infantry Regiment

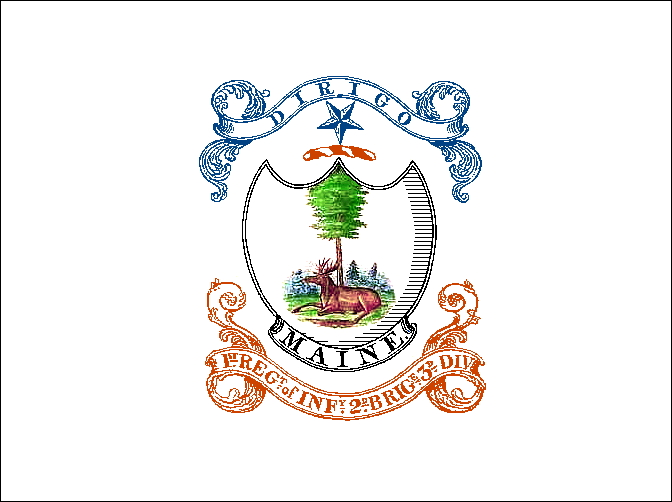
Flag of the 1st Maine Militia from 1822 to 1861

=== Former territories and administered areas ===
Flag of the Insular Government of the Philippine Islands (1919–1936)

Flag of the Commonwealth of the Philippines (1936–1942, 1945–1946)

Flag of the Panama Canal Zone (1903–1979)

Flag of the Trust Territory of the Pacific Islands (1947–1994)

== See also ==
- Flag Day in the United States
- Flag desecration in the United States
- Flags of the U.S. states and territories
- North American Vexillological Association
- United States Flag Code
