= Flag of Reno, Nevada =

City of Reno

The flag of Reno, Nevada, consists of a circle which contains a grey, dark blue and blue stripe surmounted by a dark blue mountain topped with an orange sunset the whole in a dark blue background accompanied an eight-pointed star in the top left corner. A 10-year-old designed the original flag in 1960 but was never adopted officially in a city ordinance.

== Design ==
The blue background represents the state of Nevada, of which Reno is part. The bottom of the circle, which is of a silver color, symbolizes the mining in the area and the bright blue is for Truckee River which is a tourist attraction as well as a natural resource provider. Surmounting it are the Sierra Nevada mountains whom, like Lake Tahoe, are a tourist attraction and a natural resource provider. The gold surmounting it all evokes the Nevada desert. The eight-pointed star at the top left corner is the one on the Reno arch.

== History ==
1959–2018

The original flag was designed by a 10 year old in 1960 and consisted of a deep blue background, a white Nevada with a star in the vicinity of Reno on the left and all caps "RENO" on the right. It was criticized for being too simple and was never officially adopted by the city. It was adopted via a community contest. A citizen committee selected the best design out of the 73 entries which were submitted. The winner was Robert Dressler, a 5th grader at Orvis Ring School in Reno. The design was a good community banner, however it was not a very popular symbol among inhabitants of the city. In 2018, a flag contest was held in which 1,000 comments and 51,000 votes were submitted and 13 finalists were chosen. And of these 13 five were selected. Stosic's design was adopted unanimously. The Reno Arts and Culture Commission showed the results from the online vote for a new city flag and it was unveiled at a Reno Aces game on May 9 to honor the city's 150th birthday. Since then, it received an A-grade and was rated number 2 of over 300 flags reviewed in the 2022 North American Vexillological Association survey, behind the Flag of Tulsa and ahead of Salem, Oregon.

== Similarity with Milwaukee People's flag ==
Milwaukee People's Flag

In 2018, an article by newscaster Tom Durian of WTMJ Channel 4 claimed that Reno's flag, which at that time had recently been adopted, was very similar to the Milwaukee People's flag. Mike Higdon of the Reno Gazette-Journal posted an article afterwards titled: "No, Milwaukee, Reno didn't steal your flag design because ours is better ;)" saying it was only a coincidence. In defence of WTMJ, the Milwaukee Journal Sentinel posted an article titled: "It's OK Reno, Nev., your new flag design looks good, just like the Milwaukee People's Flag" explaining how it might be a coincidence, but if it wasn't, it was just because the Milwaukee People's flag was just that good. After this short dispute, many articles were posted in defense of Milwaukee or Reno.
