= Flag of Miami =

City of Miami
- Proportion: 2:3
- Adopted: November 13, 1933; 93 years ago
- Design: Horizontal triband with city seal in the center
- Designed by: Charles L. Gmeinder, Jr.

The city flag of Miami depicts three horizontal stripes, one orange, one white, and one green, and the city's seal in the middle of the white stripe. The city seal of Miami includes text stylized in capital letters surrounding its perimeter, reading "The City of Miami" and "Dade Co., Florida." Inside the seal, the phrase "Incorporated 1896" is split in half by a palm tree. The flag was designed by Charles L. Gmeinder, Jr. and was adopted November 13, 1933.

The orange stripe of the flag represents Florida's orange industry and the green stripe represents the foliage of Miami, with the white having no meaning. In the North American Vexillological Association's 2004 survey of American city flags, the flag of Miami ranked 70th with a score of 4.18.

== See also ==
- Flag of Florida
