= Noli me tangere =

Latin translation of "touch me not"; influential phrase derived from the Christian Bible

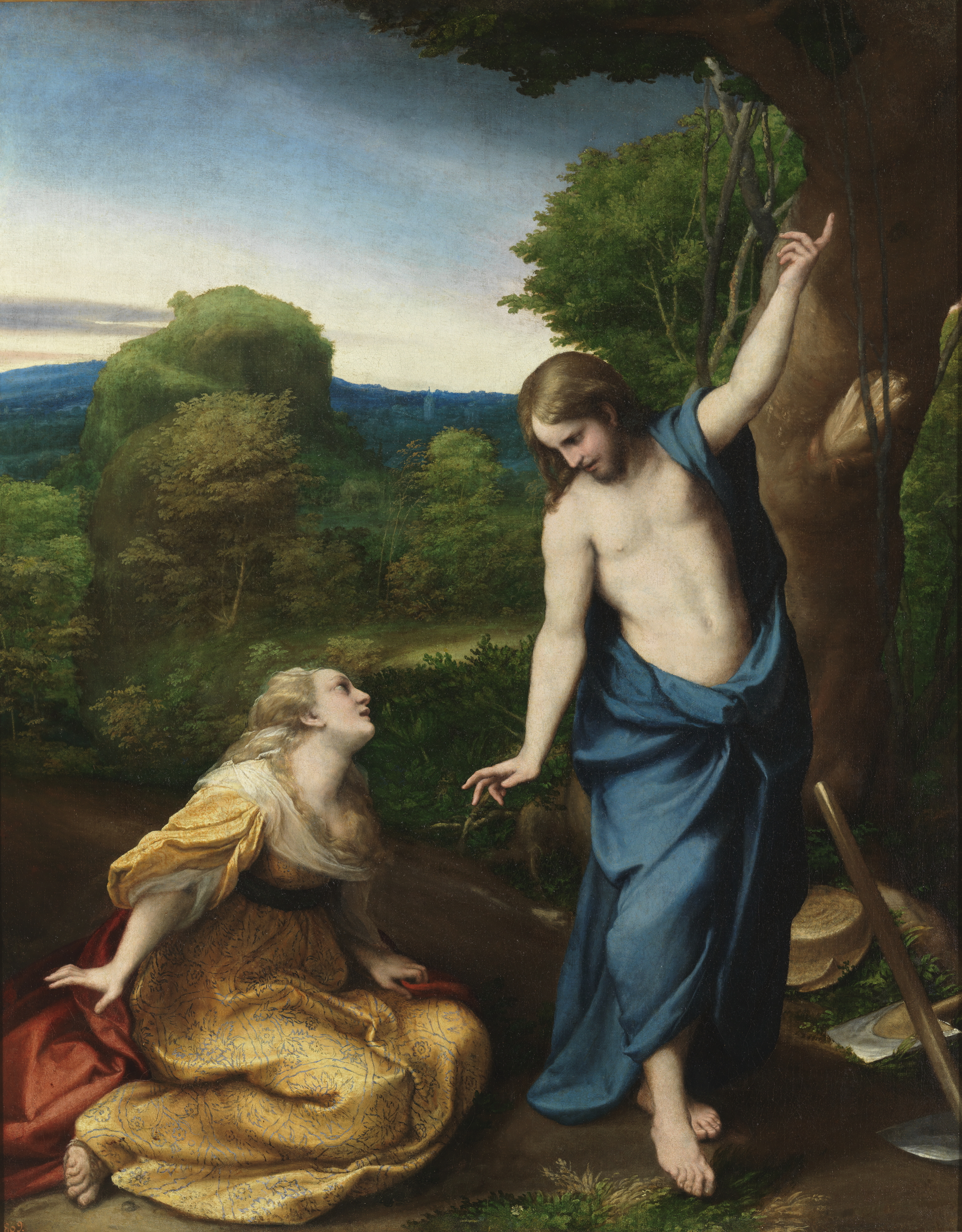
Noli me Tangere by Antonio da Correggio, c. 1525

Noli me tangere ('touch me not') is the Latin version of a phrase spoken, according to John 20:17, by Jesus to Mary Magdalene when she recognized him after His resurrection. The original Koine Greek phrase is Μή μου ἅπτου (mḗ mou háptou). The biblical scene has been portrayed in numerous works of Christian art from Late Antiquity to the present. The phrase has also been used in literature, and later in a variation by military units since the late 18th century.

== Interpretation ==
According to Maurice Zundel (1897–1975), in asking Mary Magdalene not to touch him, Jesus indicates that once the resurrection is accomplished, the link between human beings and his person must no longer be physical, but must be a bond of heart to heart. "He must establish this gap, she must understand that the only possible way is faith, that the hands can not reach the person and that it is from within, from within only, that we can approach Him." Likewise, later, when Thomas reached out to touch the wounds of Jesus, Christ declares: "blessed are those who have not seen and yet have believed" [John 20:29] because "He knows it is useless."

Christians of Western Catholic tradition, namely Catholics, Lutherans, and Anglicans, would say this statement is to be received in relation to the Ascension of Jesus. That is, because he had not yet ascended to the right hand of God, it was more of a "not yet" statement rather than a "never" cling to me. Jesus became incarnate for the sake of humanity and is explicitly said to retain his human body. When Jesus ascended to the right hand of the Father, he "fills all things" (e.g. Eph. 1:23), and can properly be clung to in the means of grace he provides, such as in the Eucharist.

== Liturgical use ==
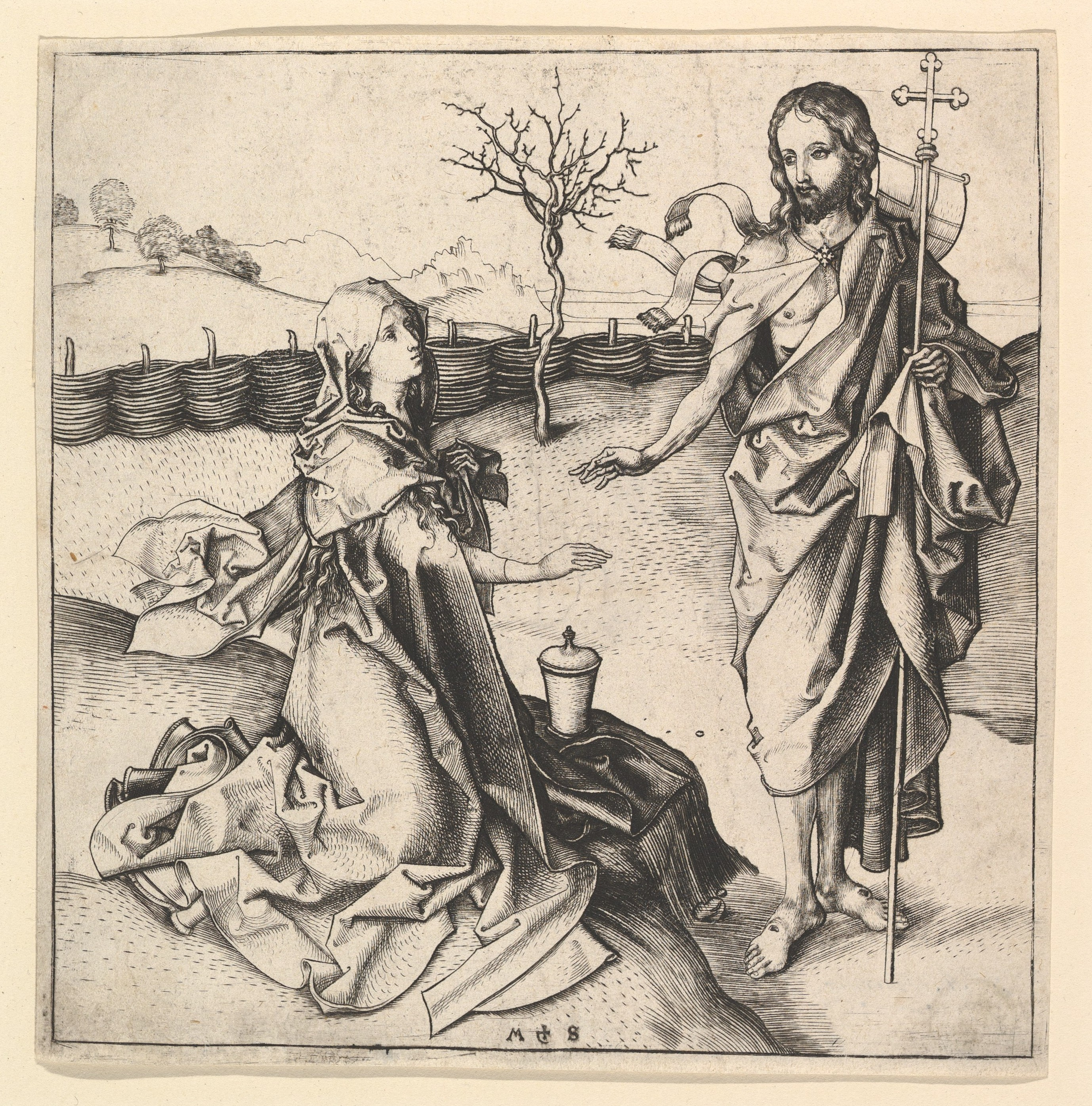
Engraving by Martin Schongauer, 15th century

The words are a popular trope in Gregorian chant. The supposed moment in which they were spoken was a popular subject for paintings in cycles of the Life of Christ and as single subjects, for which the phrase is the usual title.

In the Eastern Orthodox Church and Eastern Catholic Churches, the Gospel passage including Noli me tangere is one of the eleven Matins Gospels read during the All Night Vigil or Matins on Sunday mornings.

== Echoes ==
=== In medicine ===
In medicine, the words were occasionally used to describe a disease known to medieval physicians as a "hidden cancer" or cancer absconditus; the more the swellings associated with these cancers were handled, the worse they became.

=== Botany ===
The touch-me-not balsam is known by the binominal name Impatiens noli-tangere; its seed pods can explode when touched, dispersing the seeds widely. Hibiscus noli-tangere has sharp glass-like needles that detach from its leaves when touched.

=== In culture and literature ===
Like other significant scenes in the Gospels, this expression was used repeatedly in Christian culture, specifically literature. Following 14th-century poet Petrarch, 16th-century poet Sir Thomas Wyatt, in his lyric poem "Whoso list to hunt", says the speaker is hunting a hind, who stands for the elusive lover. The doe wears an inscribed collar: "There is written, her fair neck round about: / Noli me tangere, for Caesar's I am". Pliny the Elder had an account about deer of "Caesar", which lived 300 years and wore collars with that inscription. In another source, Solinus (fl. 3rd century AD) wrote that after Alexander the Great collared deer, they survived 100 years. He did not mention any inscription on the collars.

D. H. Lawrence refers to the phrase on several occasions, most notably in his poem "Noli Me Tangere" satirizing cerebralism.

Filipino poet and national hero José Rizal used this phrase as the title of his novel, Noli Me Tángere (1887), criticizing the Spanish colonization of the Philippines. He writes that ophthalmologists use this phrase in reference to a cancer of the eyelids. It symbolized the people's blindness to the ruling government, which Rizal deemed a social cancer that people were too afraid to touch.

The thirteen-hour version of the experimental film Out 1 (1971) is sometimes subtitled Noli Me Tangere, as an ironic reference to it being the uncut version favoured by the director Jacques Rivette (as opposed to the edited version, Out 1: Spectre, which is four hours long).

Novelist Anne Enright repeatedly uses the phrase in reference to character Lambert Nugent, nicknamed Nolly May, in her Booker-prize winning novel The Gathering.

=== In United States ===
The Gadsden flag

Historically, the phrase was used by Revolutionary-Era Americans in reference to the Gadsden flag—with its derivation "don't tread on me"—and other representations dating to the American Revolutionary War.

In the United States military, the phrase is the motto of the U.S. Army's oldest infantry regiment, the 3rd U.S. Infantry Regiment (The Old Guard), located at Fort Myer, Virginia. The derivation "Don't tread on me" is also used in the First Navy Jack of United States Navy. It is also the motto of the U.S. Army 4th Infantry Regiment, located in Hohenfels, Germany. The Royal Air Force adopted this motto for the No. 103 (Bomber) Squadron.

== Relic ==
A piece of forehead flesh covered by skin, previously attached to the alleged skull of Mary Magdalene, is kept in the cathedral of Saint-Maximin-la-Sainte-Baume in southern France. The relic is purported to be from the spot above Mary's temple touched by Jesus at the post-resurrection encounter in the garden.

== Artistic representation ==
The biblical scene of Mary Magdalene's recognizing Jesus Christ after his resurrection was repeatedly represented as the subject in a long, widespread, and continuous iconographic tradition in Christian art from Late Antiquity until today. Pablo Picasso, for example, used the c. 1525 painting Noli me tangere by Antonio da Correggio, stored in the Museo del Prado, as an iconographic source for his 1903 painting La Vie (Cleveland Museum of Art) from his so-called Blue Period.

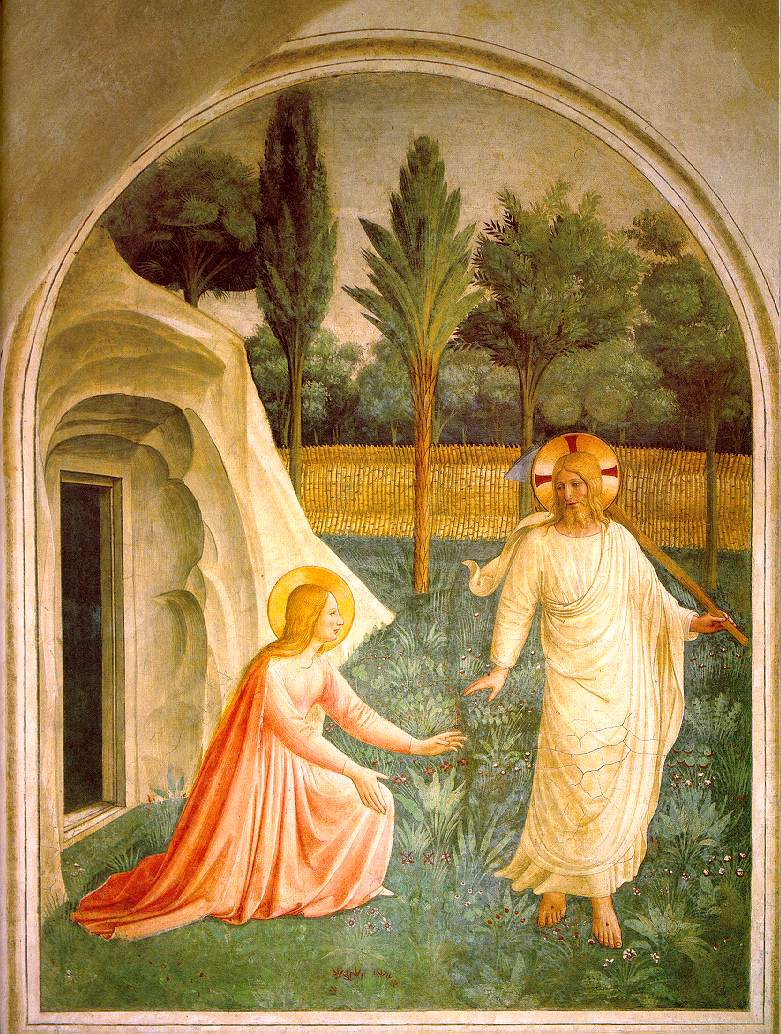
Noli me tangere fresco by Fra Angelico, 1442

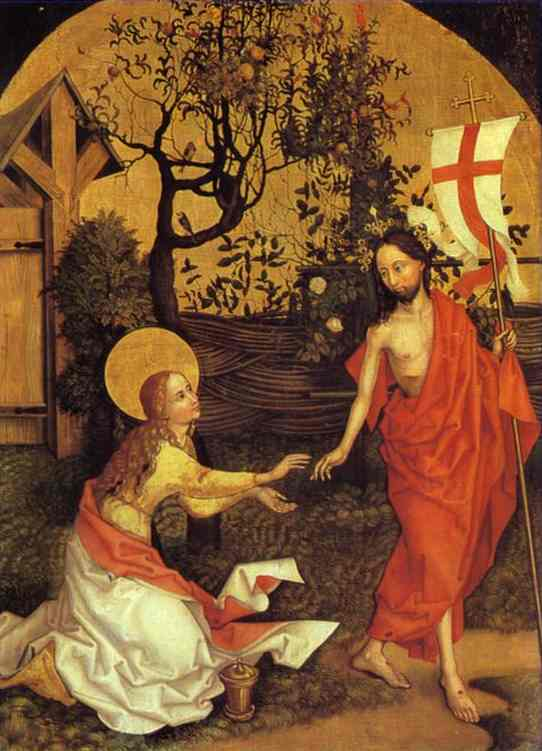
Noli me tangere by Martin Schongauer, 1477

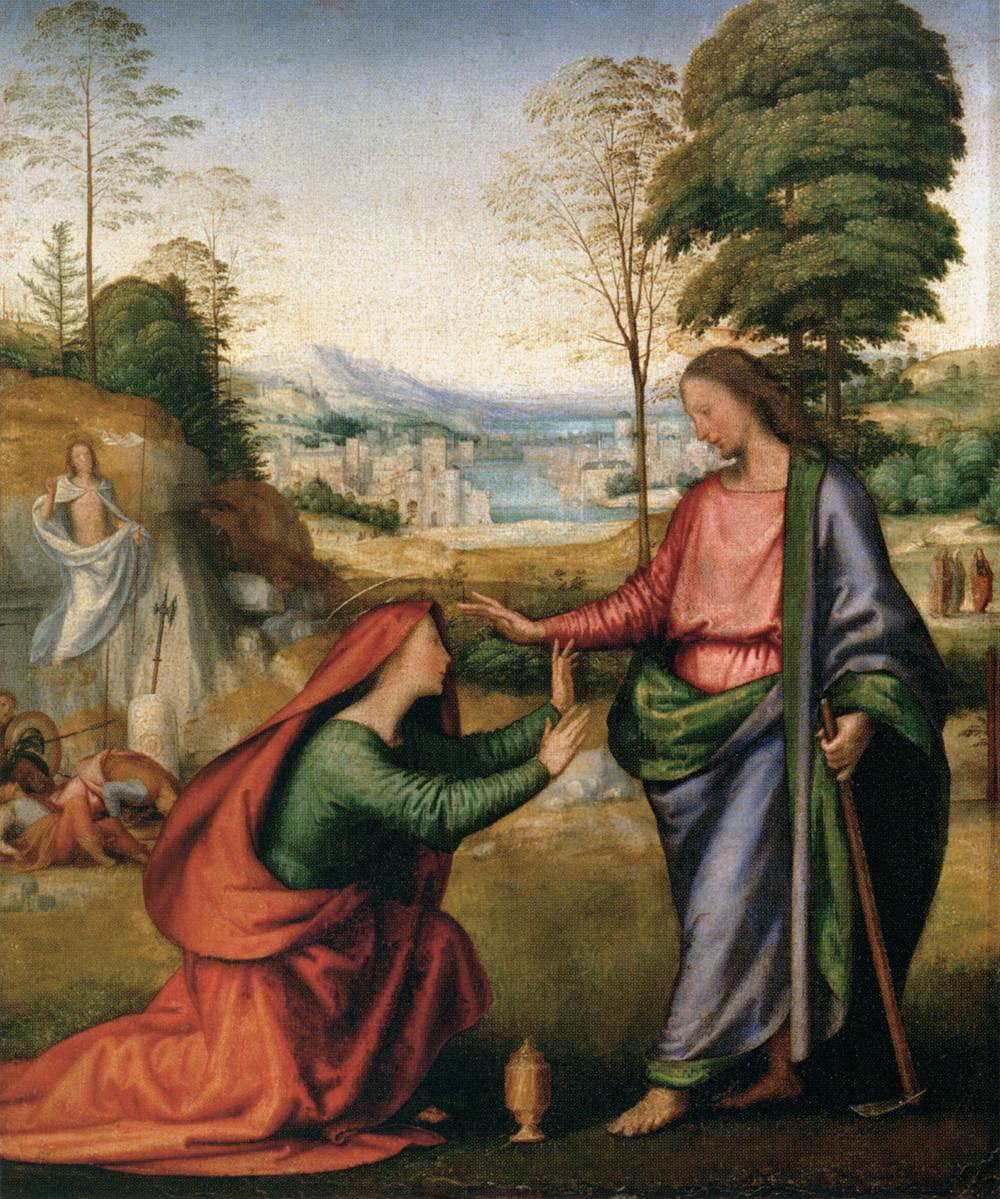
Noli Me Tangere, by Fra Bartolomeo c. 1506

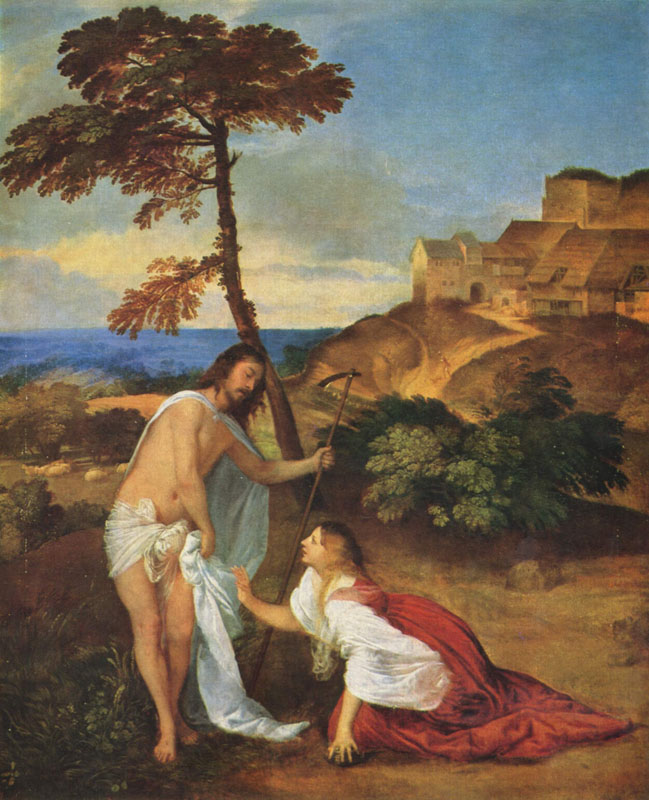
Noli me tangere by Titian c. 1511–1515

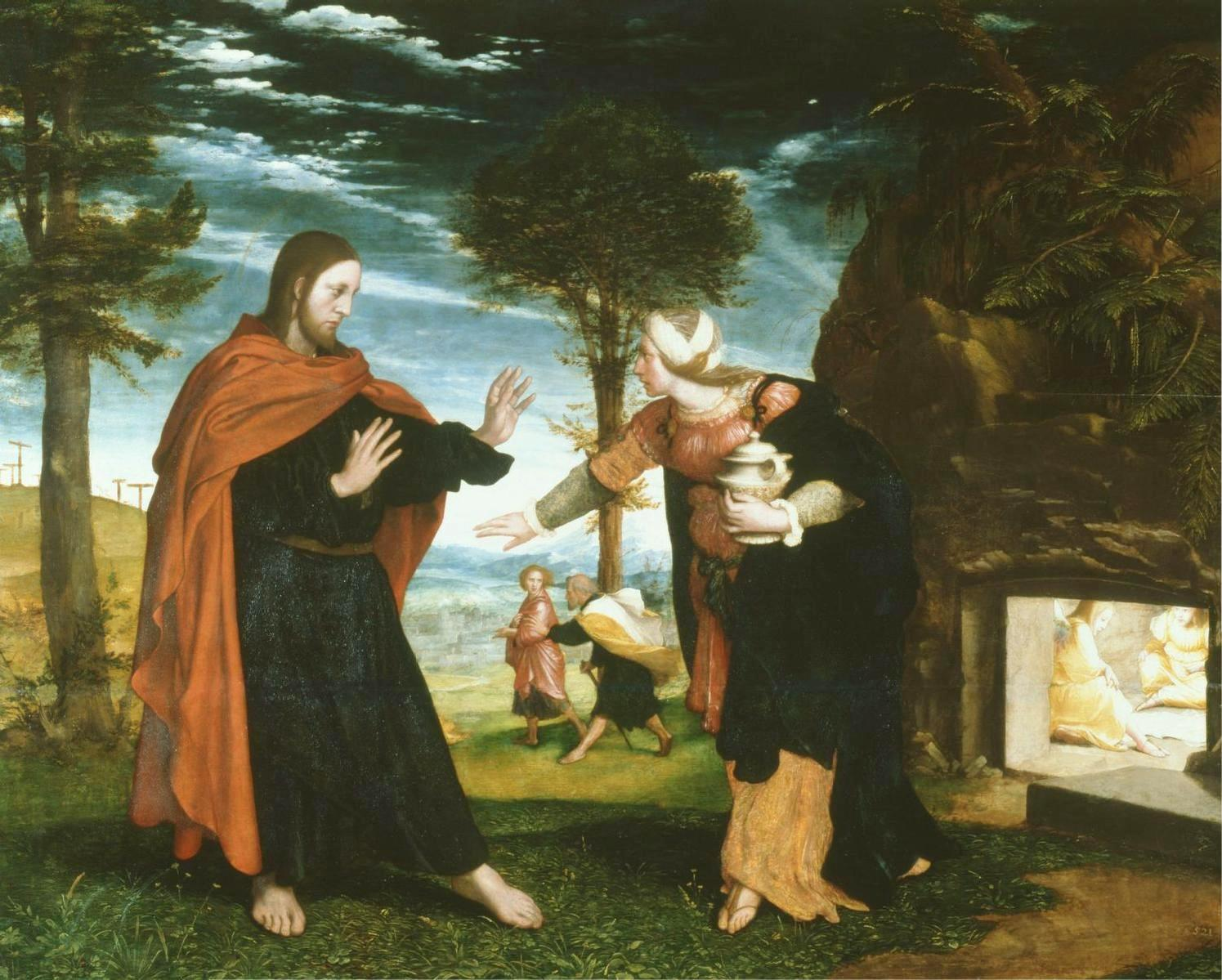
Noli me Tangere by Hans Holbein the Younger, 1524

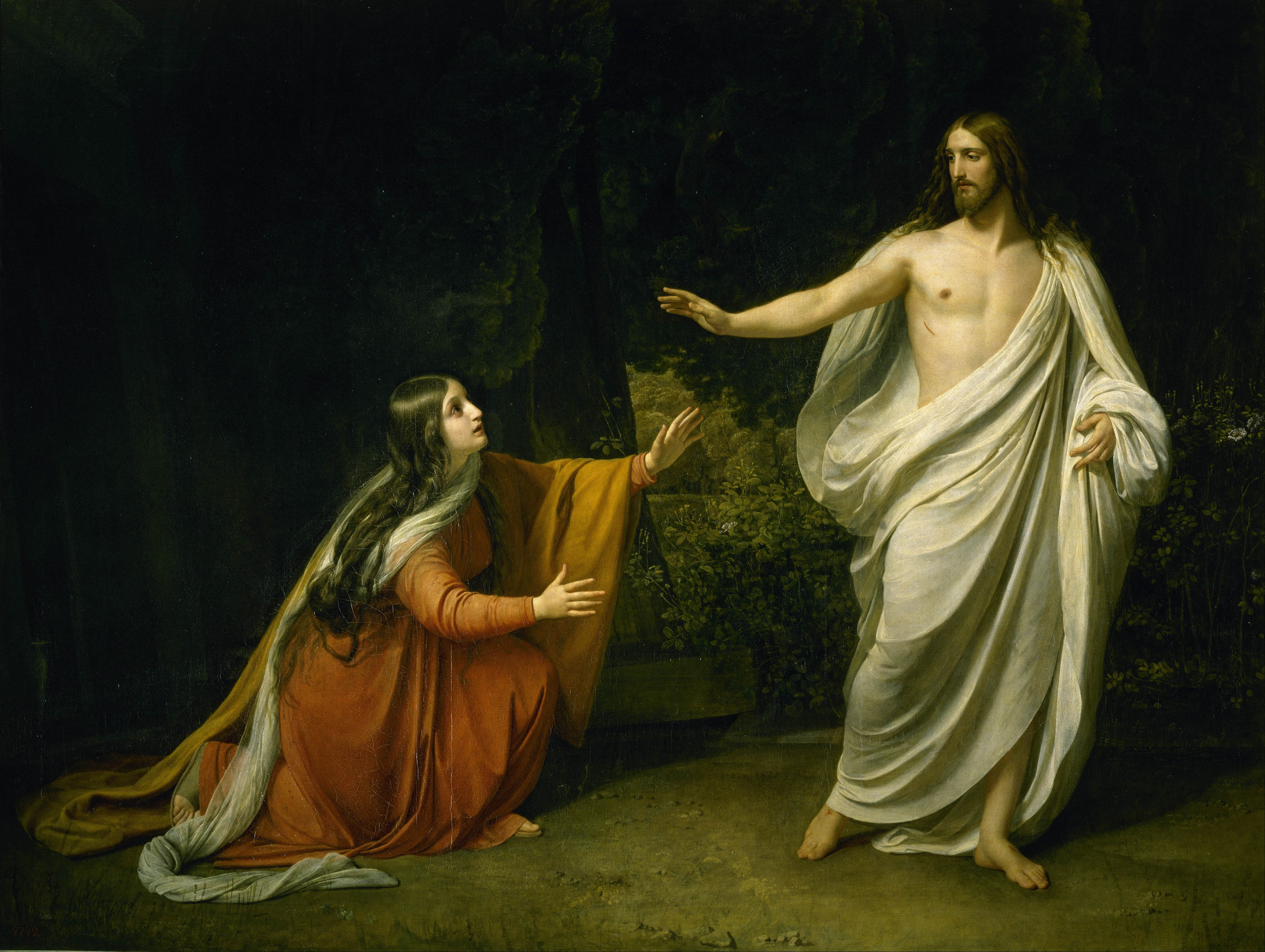
Christ's Appearance to Mary Magdalene after the Resurrection, Alexander Ivanov, 1835

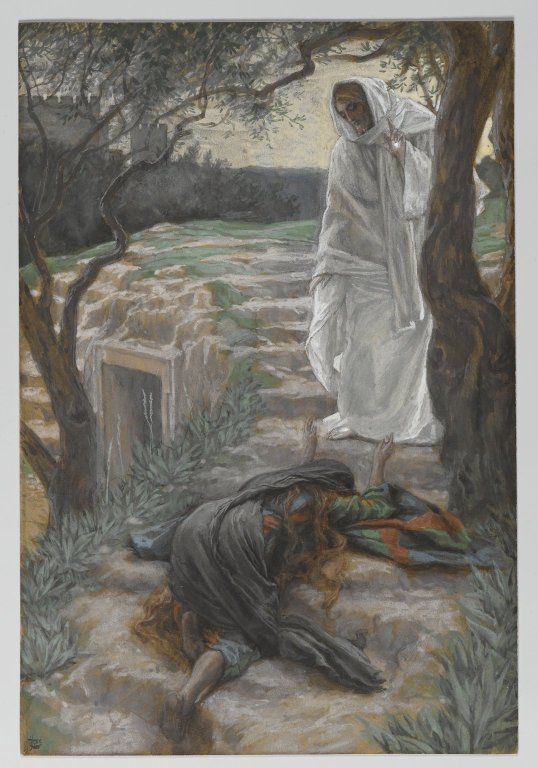
Touch Me Not (Noli me tangere) by James Tissot, 1886-1894

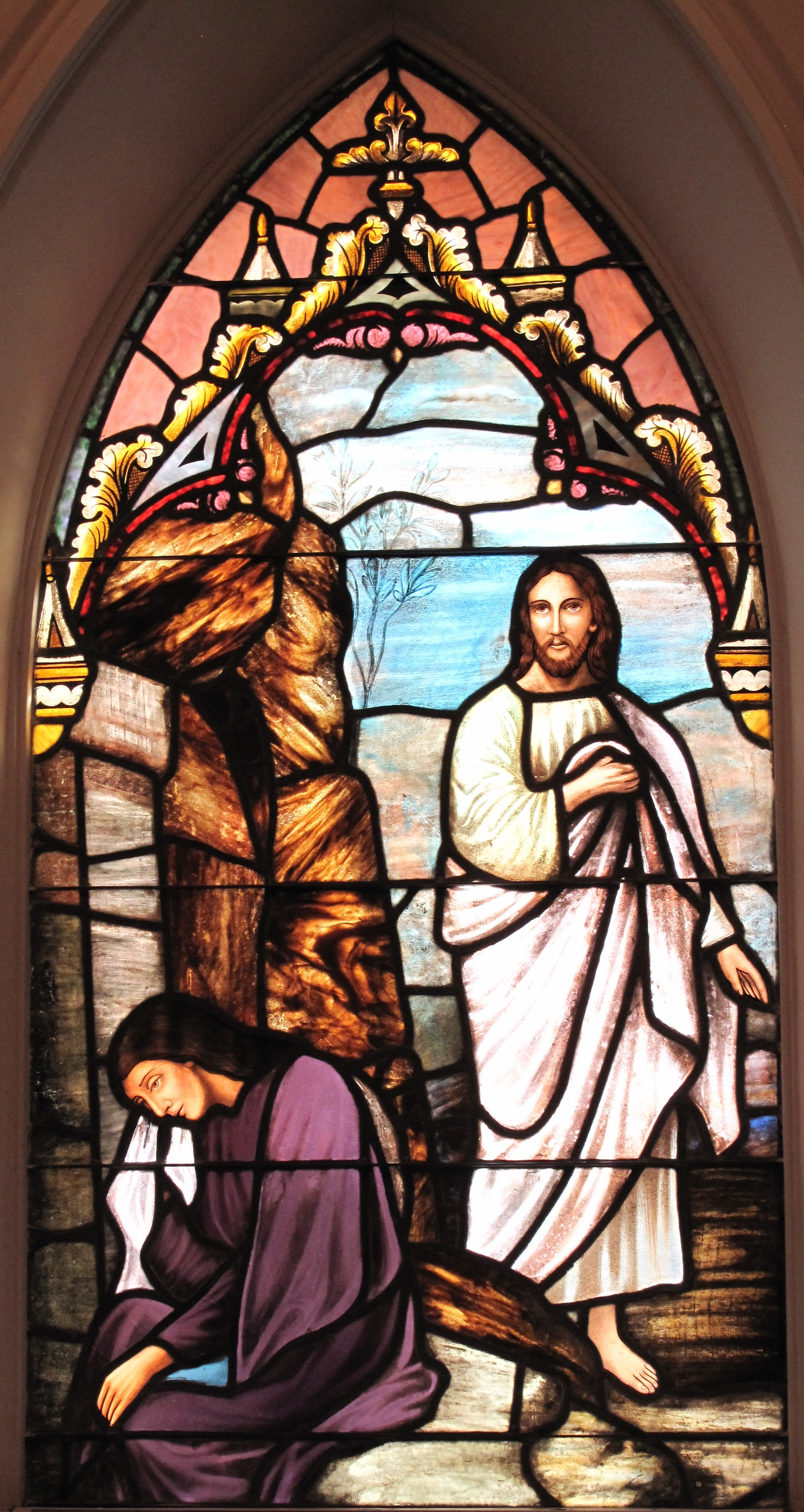
Mary of Magdala at the empty tomb, window at St. Matthew's Lutheran Church. Attributed to the Quaker City Glass Company of Philadelphia, 1912

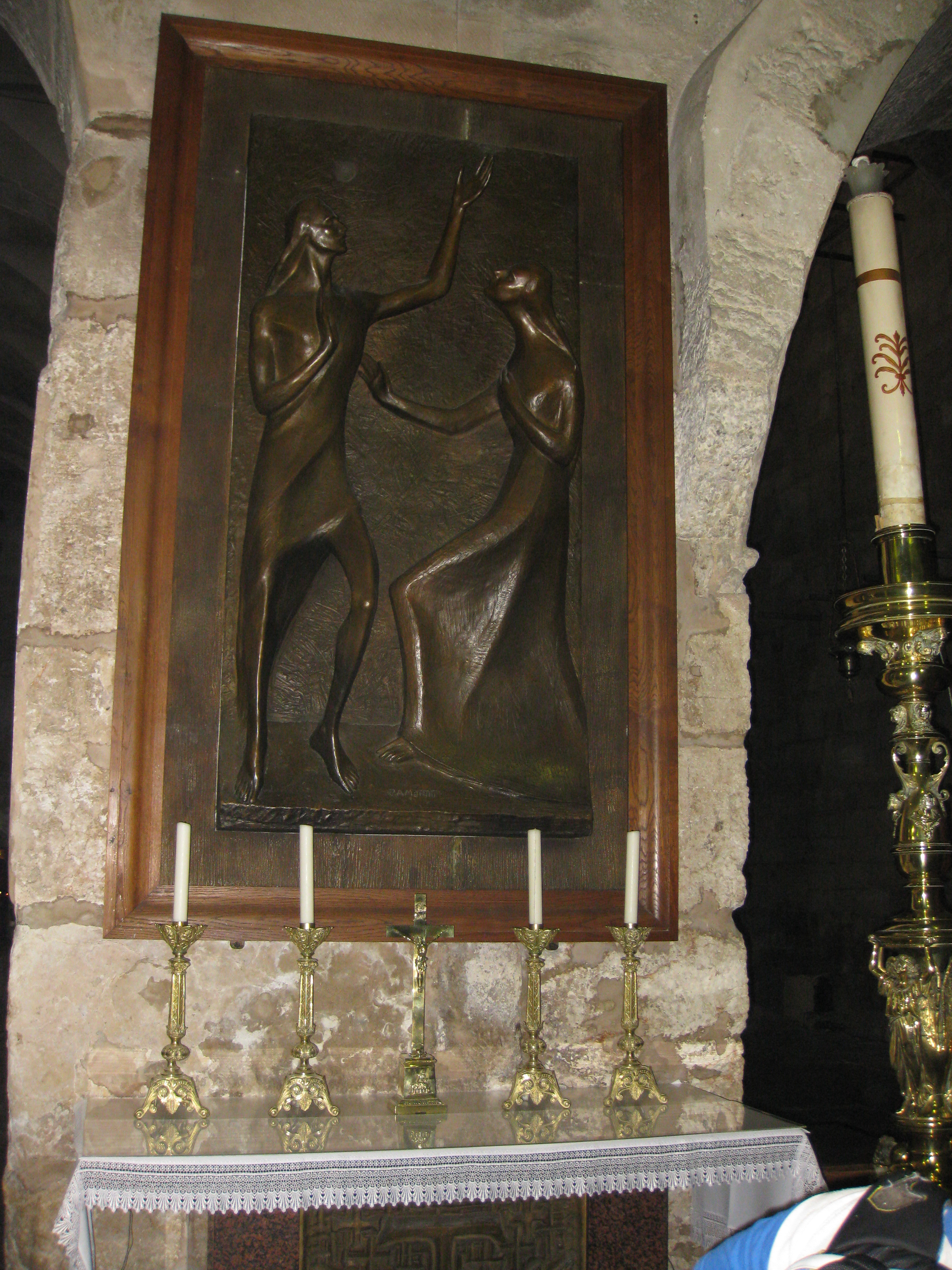
According to Christian tradition, the Noli me tangere took place in what is now the Chapel of Mary Magdalene adjacent to the Church of the Holy Sepulchre, Jerusalem

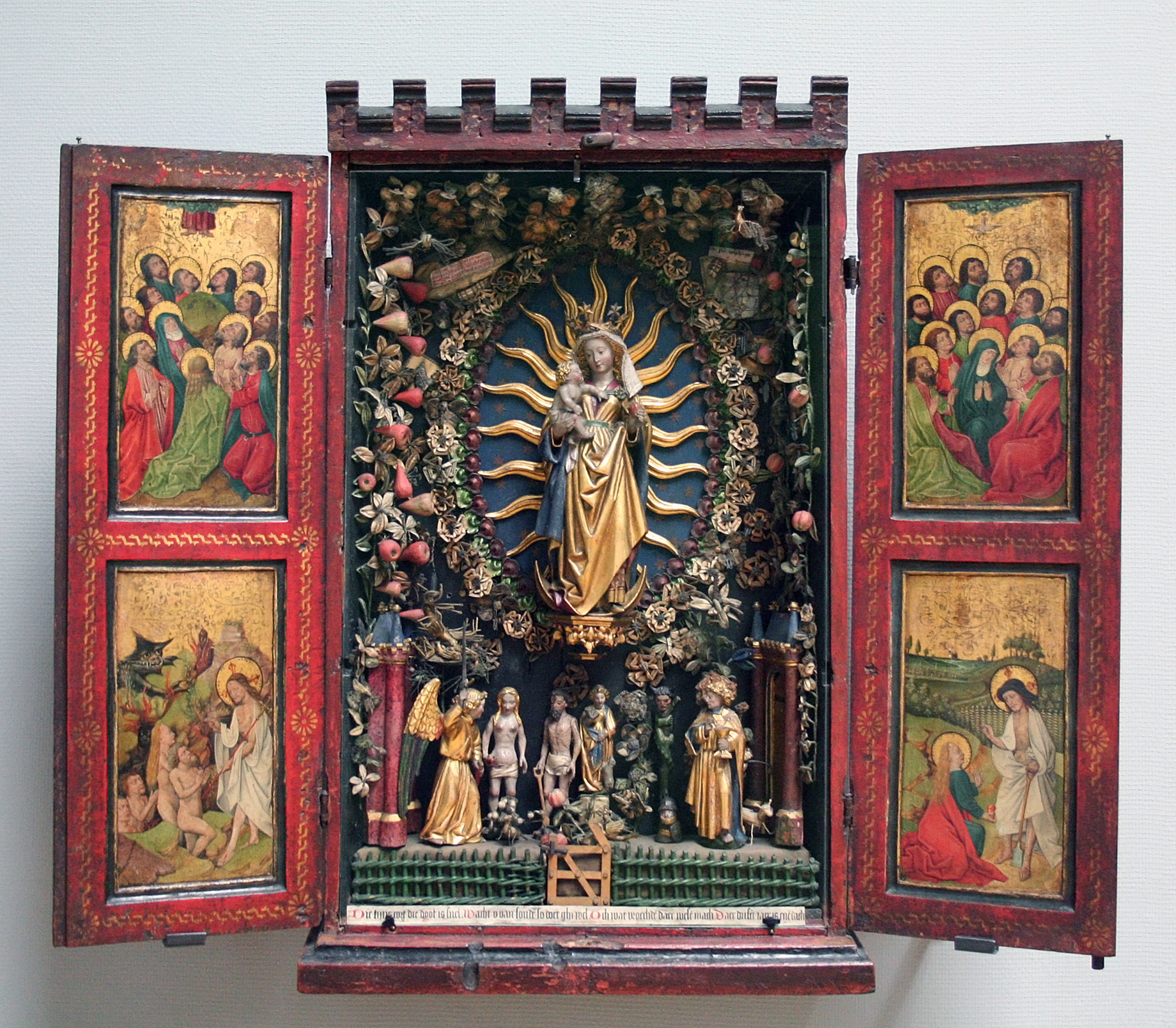
Hortus Conclusus triptych, Royal Museum of Fine Arts Antwerp, date unknown

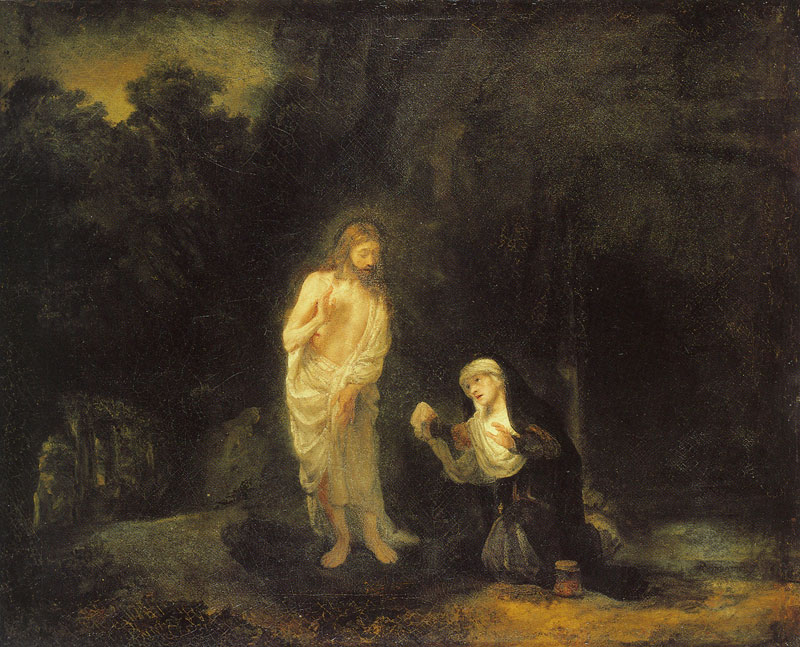
Noli me Tangere by Rembrandt, 1651

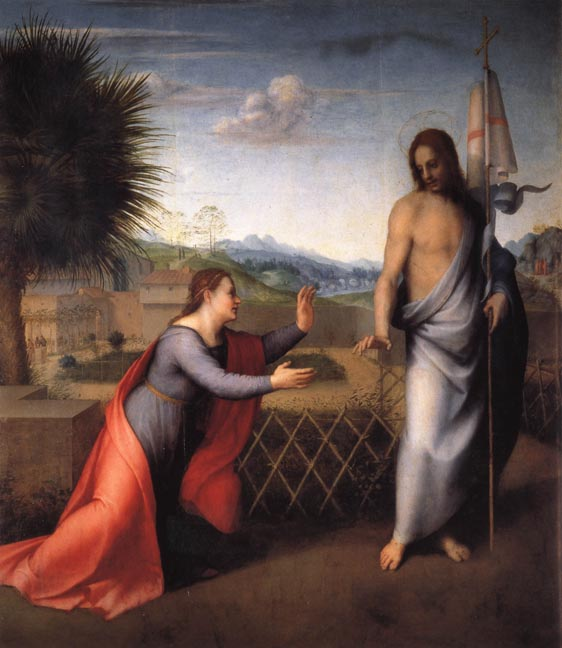
Noli me tangere by Andrea del Sarto, c. 1510

== See also ==
- Life of Jesus in the New Testament
- Post-resurrection appearances of Jesus
- Noli Me Tángere (novel)
- Noli me tangere casket
- Nemo me impune lacessit – "no one assails me with impunity"

== Bibliography ==
- Bieringer, R; B. Baert; K. Demasure. 2016. "Noli mi tangere" in interdisciplinary perspective. Bristol, CN: Peeters.−
- Cannon, Devereaux D. Jr. (1991), The Flags of the Confederacy: An Illustrated History, St. Lukes Press, ISBN 978-0918518637
- Shipley, Joseph Twadell (2001), The Origins of English Words: A Discursive Dictionary of Indo-European Roots, The Johns Hopkins University Press, ISBN 978-0801830044
