= Don't Tread on Me =

American revolutionary slogan

Gadsden flag

First Navy Jack

South Carolina Navy ensign

Culpeper Minutemen flag

The reverse side of Alabama's 1861 state flag with the Latin phrase "noli me tangere", which translates to "touch me not"

Don't Tread on Me, usually stylized fully in uppercase letters without an apostrophe (DONT TREAD ON ME), is a political slogan dating to the American Revolution.

== Origins ==
It is an alternative English translation to the Latin phrase Noli me tangere. Historically, Revolutionary-Era Americans used it in reference to the Gadsden flag—with its derivation "don't tread on me"—and other representations dating to the American Revolutionary War.

== Uses ==
=== United States military mottoes ===
In the United States military, the phrase is the motto of the US Army's oldest infantry regiment, the 3rd U.S. Infantry Regiment (The Old Guard), located at Fort Myer, Virginia. "Don't tread on me" is also used in the First Navy Jack of United States Navy. It is also the motto of the US Army's 4th Infantry Regiment, located in Hohenfels, Germany. The Royal Air Force adopted this motto for the No. 103 (Bomber) Squadron.

=== Flags ===
- Gadsden flag, with a yellow field and coiled rattlesnake
- First Navy Jack, with a striped field of red and white
- South Carolina Navy jack, with a striped field of red and blue
- A flag with a white field used by the Culpeper Minutemen
- A flag with a yellow field and a porcupine used by the Free State Project

=== Music ===
- Don't Tread on Me (album), a 2005 alternative rock album by 311
  - "Don't Tread on Me" (311 song), eponymous song from the album
- "Don't Tread on Me" (Metallica song), a 1991 heavy metal song by Metallica
- "Don't Tread on Me" (We the Kingdom song), 2021
- "The Reckoning" (Iced Earth song), a 2003 power metal song by Iced Earth
- Don't Tread on Me (Harlem Hellfighters), a 2021 song by Ukrainian death metal band 1914 (band) on album Where Fear and Weapons Meet
- A 1960s protopunk song by Kit and the Outlaws
- A 1986 hardcore punk song by Cro-Mags on The Age of Quarrel
- A 1992 hard rock song by Damn Yankees on Don't Tread
- “Don’t Tread On Me (feat. Earl Dibbles Jr.),” a 2018 country song by Granger Smith.
- "Don't Tread On Me," a 2023 country song by Tracy Barfield
- "Don't Tread On Me" is the title of American Oi! band Anti-Heros' second studio album
- "Don't Tread On Me" a track on the "Outburst" vinyl LP of the Swedish Garage Rock band "The Nomads", released on October 1, 1984.

=== Sports ===
- United States men's national soccer team (USMNT) and United States women's national soccer team (USWNT) adapted the motto (sometimes abbreviated to "Don't Tread"), along with a snake crest on certain of their apparel and merchandise designed by Nike.

=== Other uses ===
- A chapter in John Adams, a 2008 TV miniseries

== See also ==
- Pine Tree Flag (An Appeal to Heaven)
- Come and Take It
- Liberté, égalité, fraternité
