= Jack of the United States =

United States maritime flag

Jack of the United States of America
- Jack of the United States as seen on the flag of the United States
- Union Jack
- Proportion: 71:100
- Adopted: 1777 (initial use of underlying design template); July 4, 1960 (current design); July 4, 2019 (readopted)
- Design: 50 white five-pointed stars defacing a blue field in 9 rows, alternating between 6 and 5 stars (top to bottom), or 11 rows alternating between 5 and 4 stars (left to right).

The jack of the United States, referred to as the Union Jack by the U.S. Navy, is a maritime jack flag flown on the bow of U.S. vessels that are moored or anchored. In addition to commissioned U.S. Navy ships, the jack is used by the U.S. Coast Guard, the Military Sealift Command, the ships of the National Oceanic and Atmospheric Administration, and other U.S. government entities. While anchored or moored, the jack is flown on the bow of a ship, and the ensign (which, for the U.S. Navy is the national flag) is flown on the stern. Once under way, the jack is lowered.

The Union Jack was adopted on June 14, 1777, alongside the U.S. national flag itself. Since then, the jack has essentially consisted of the canton of the national flag, with each star added to the national flag being added to the Union Jack also.

It is widely held that, before the Union Jack, the jack of the United States was the First Navy Jack. The exact historical appearance of this flag is disputed, but it is displayed today by the Navy bearing a rattlesnake and motto. During the last several decades, the Union Jack has sometimes been temporarily removed from use—such as from 1975 to 1976, when the First Navy Jack was flown for the U.S. Bicentennial; in 2000, when submarines and submarine tenders flew a special jack for the hundredth anniversary of the first commissioned U.S. Navy submarine; and for all warships from 2002 to 2019, when the Navy flew the First Navy Jack for the war on terror.

The oldest commissioned warship in active U.S. naval status (that is, having the longest total period in active status) that is not USS Constitution (technically the oldest commissioned ship in the U.S. Navy but is only used for ceremonial purposes) or USS Pueblo (captured by North Korea in 1968 and is still commissioned in the U.S. Navy; it is currently a museum ship) flies the First Navy Jack, and is the only active U.S. warship that flies a different jack than the Union Jack. Currently, this ship is USS Blue Ridge.

== History ==
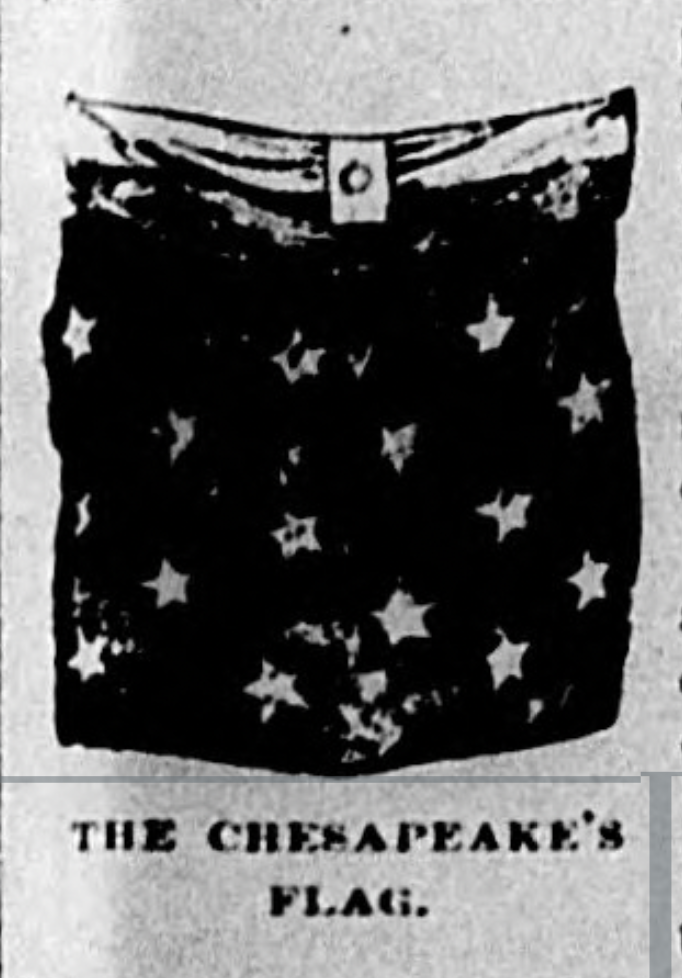
Jack of USS Chesapeake, 1812

For most of U.S. history, the primary jack design has been the blue canton with stars (the "union") from the U.S. national ensign. The blue fielded, white-starred jack is referred to as the "Union Jack," not to be confused with the Union Jack of the United Kingdom, which has the same name but a different design. Like the U.S. ensign, the number of stars on the jack correspond with the number of constituent states the U.S. has. Rules for flying the jack are similar to the national ensign, except that the jack is only flown at the bow when the ship is anchored, made fast or alongside.

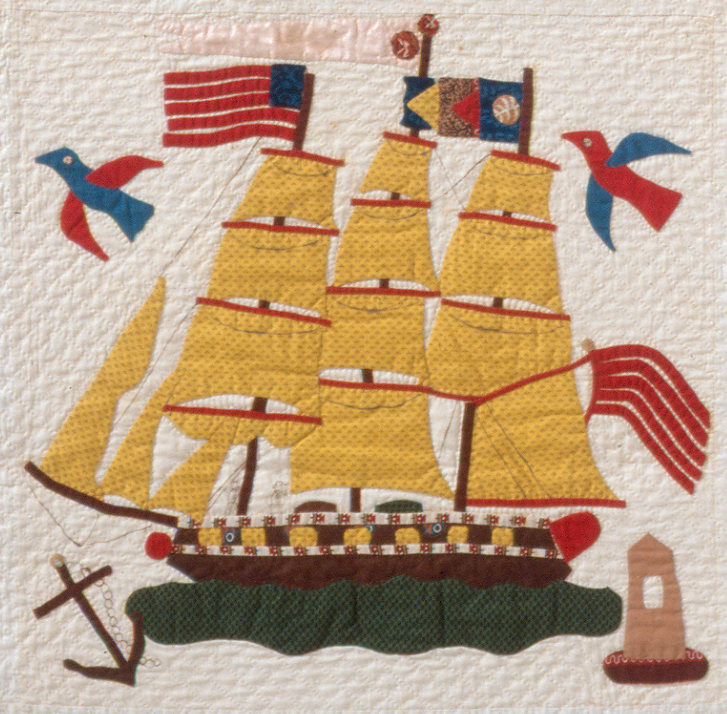
On this quilt made in Baltimore circa 1845–1855, a ship flies a red-and-white striped flag at the stern and another including a blue canton from the fore-mast.

The only written description of the Navy Jack dating from the American Revolutionary war is a January 1776 document titled Signals for the American Fleet by Commodore Esek Hopkins. Hopkins discusses "the strip'd jack" and a "striped flag" as symbols of the Continental Navy. No snake nor field of stars is mentioned, though the exact appearance of these flags is not known. A print of American ships from August 1776 shows one ship flying a striped flag and another the Pine Tree Flag, both from the stern, the customary place for a national ensign.

The 48 star version of the Union Jack flag became official in 1912 after Arizona and New Mexico became states. Throughout WWI and WWII, and until 1959 the Union Jack flag consisted of 48 stars.

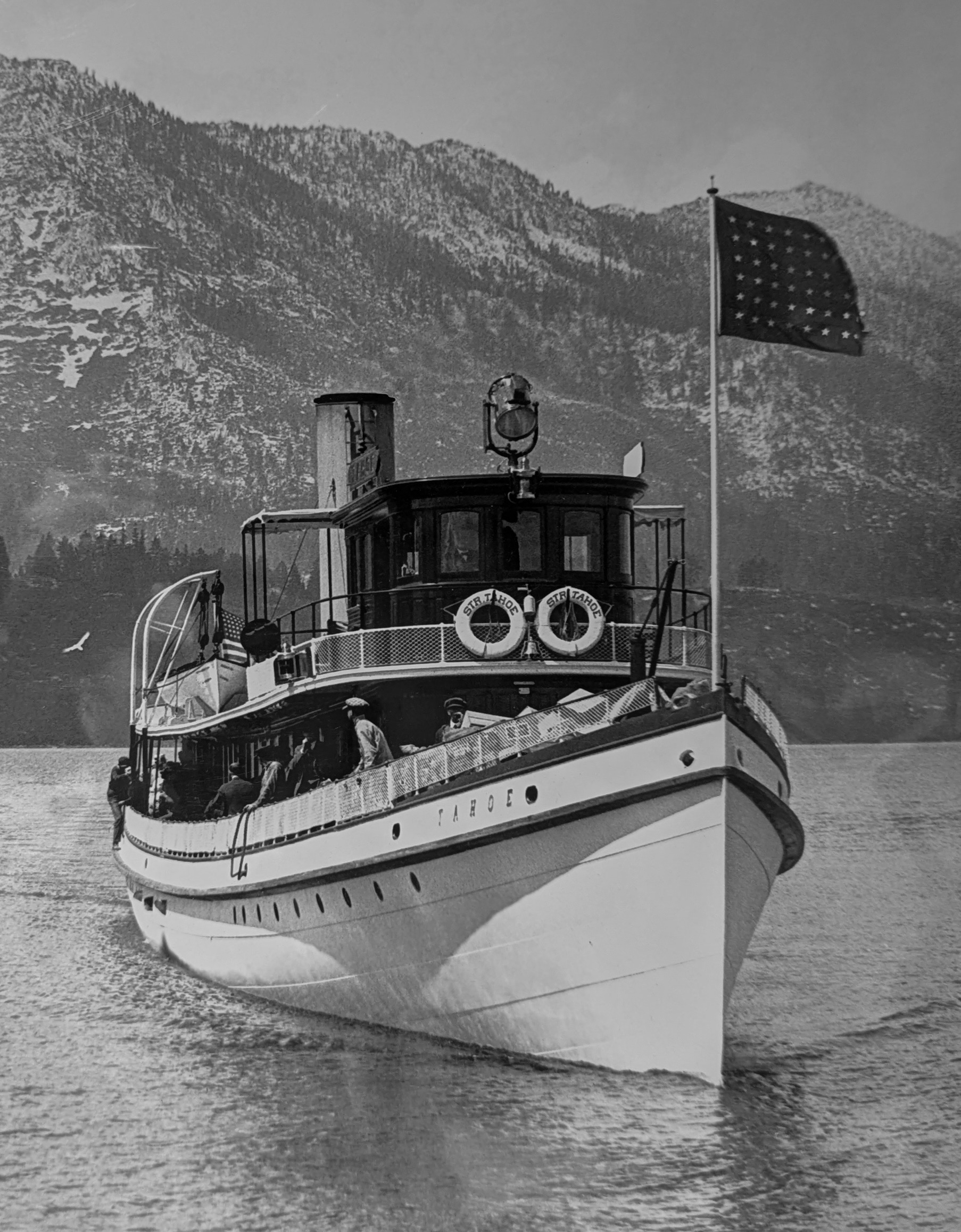
SS Tahoe flying 48 star jack, 1919

From September 11, 2002, the U.S. Navy made use of the so-called First Navy Jack. However, the standard U.S. jack (i.e. 50 white stars alternative in columns of four and five defacing a blue field) continued to be used as the jack by vessels of U.S. federal agencies such as the U.S. Coast Guard, the Military Sealift Command and the National Oceanic and Atmospheric Administration Corps and by U.S. civilian ships and by U.S. yachts. The majority of the U.S. Navy's warships returned to using the U.S. Union Jack on June 4, 2019.

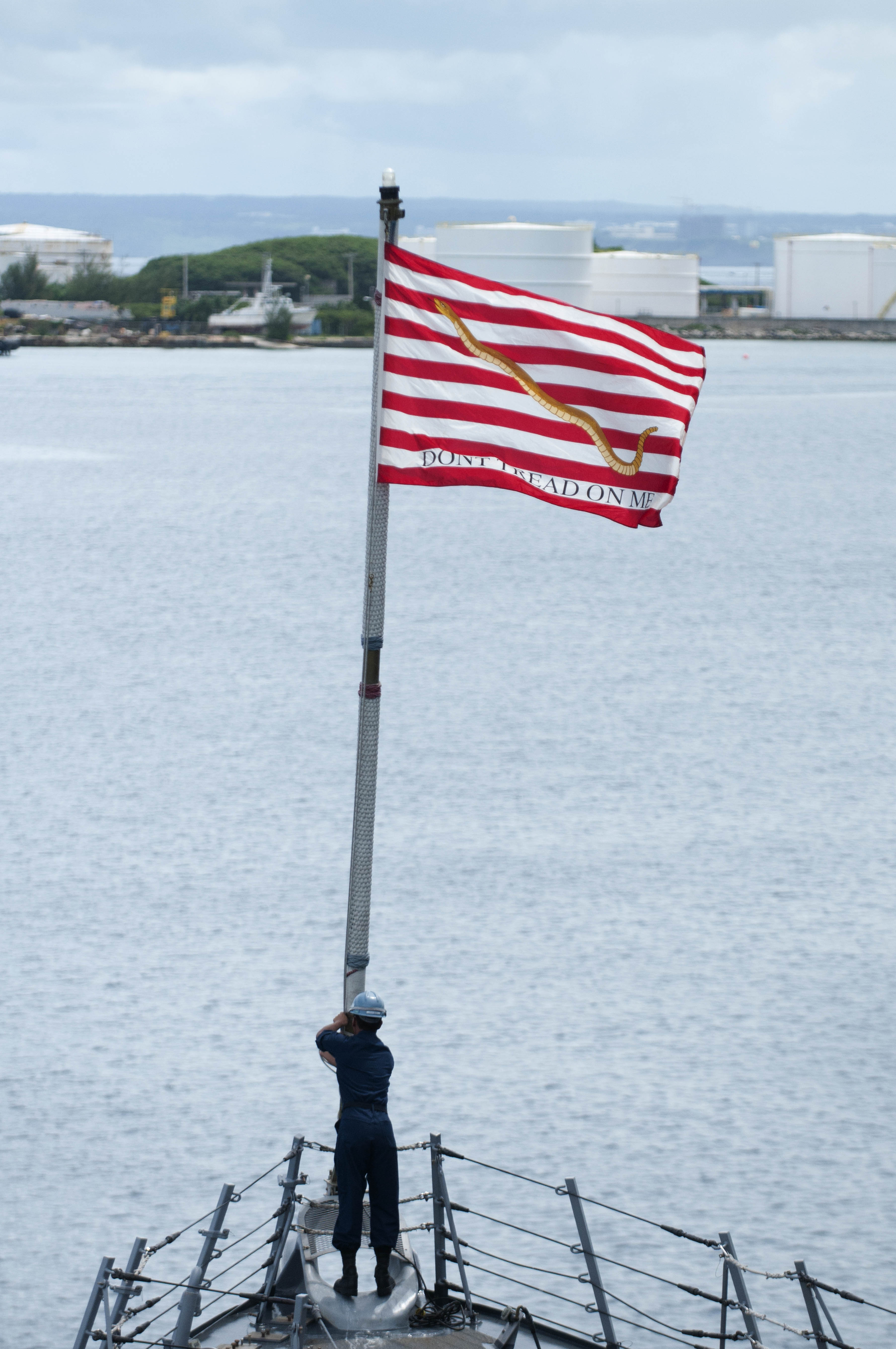
USS Mustin flying its "Don't tread on me" jack in 2012.

The jack is flown from the jackstaff from 08:00 to sunset while U.S. Navy ships are moored or at anchor. It is required to be the same size as the union of the ensign being flown from the stern of the ship. It is also flown from the yardarm during a general court-martial or court of inquiry. During times when the ensign is at half mast, the jack is also at half mast. The jack is hoisted smartly and lowered ceremoniously in the same manner as the ensign, however the jack is not dipped when the ensign is dipped.

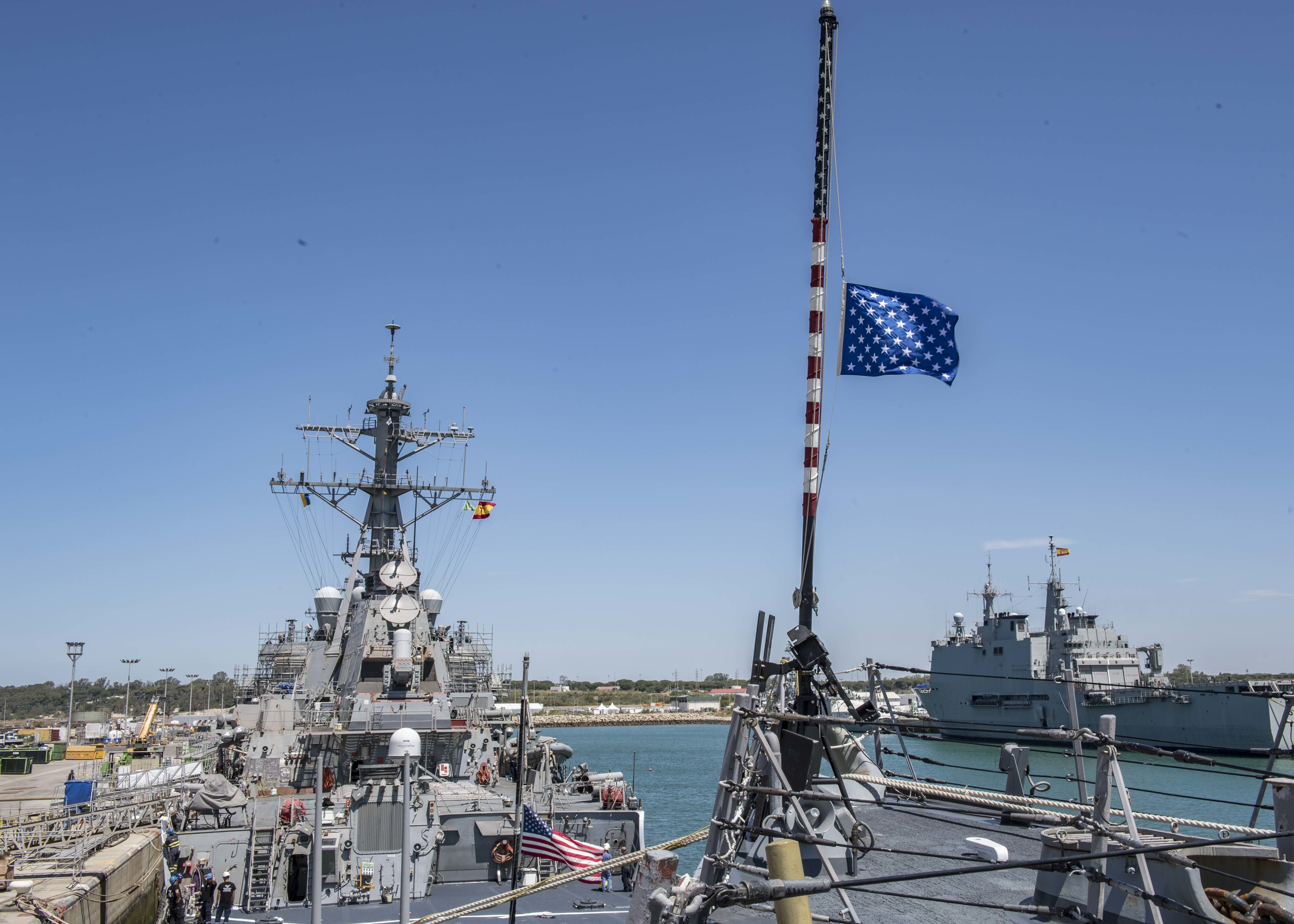
Union Jack on USS Carney during a 2019 deployment.

Some other exceptions to the use of the U.S. Union Jack have occurred in the case of the U.S. Navy, the most prominent being the use of the First Navy Jack by the U.S. Navy in honor of the U.S. founding's bicentennial and for other uses subsequently. For example, following the Bicentennial, in August 1980, use of the First Navy Jack was granted to the active commissioned ship having the longest total period of front-line operational service, this use to be in place of the Union Jack until that ship was decommissioned or transferred to inactive status, whereupon the next such ship in seniority inherits the honor of its use. This use is limited to the oldest "commissioned" naval vessel (i.e., an all-military United States Ship [ship prefix USS] versus a part-military/part-civilian crewed United States Naval Ship [ship prefix USNS]) in front-line operational service.

On June 3, 1999, the Secretary of the Navy also authorized the flying of the Submarine Centennial Jack on all U.S. Navy submarines and submarine tenders during 2000. (Note: That the U.S. Navy has, at times, elected to substitute other flags for the Union Jack has not affected its use as a jack by the Coast Guard, NOAA, other agencies and civilians.)

On February 21, 2019, the Chief of Naval Operations directed that U.S. Navy warships fly the U.S. jack again beginning on June 4, 2019. The oldest active U.S. warship flies the First Navy Jack; that ship has been USS Blue Ridge since 2014.

== Naval jacks of the United States by date ==
Stars	Design	Dates in general use	Notes
0		January 8, 1776 – June 14, 1777	The first jack adopted by the United States consisted of thirteen alternating red and white horizontal stripes. Known as the First Navy Jack, it is often depicted with a rattlesnake and motto; however, the evidence is inconclusive that the jack actually had either of these. There is reason to believe that the Continental Navy jack was simply a red and white striped flag with no other adornment.
13		June 14, 1777 – May 1, 1795	The introduction of the Union Jack design, "comprising the national ensign's blue field and white stars"; examples of many layouts of the 13-star pattern exist (see Flag of the United States).
15		May 1, 1795 – July 3, 1818	The 15-star jack was used by the United States during the Quasi-War and the War of 1812.
20		July 4, 1818 – July 3, 1819	
21		July 4, 1819 – July 3, 1820	
23		July 4, 1820 – July 3, 1822	
24		July 4, 1822 – July 3, 1836	
25		July 4, 1836 – July 3, 1837	
26		July 4, 1837 – July 3, 1845	
27		July 4, 1845 – July 3, 1846	
28		July 4, 1846 – July 3, 1847	
29		July 4, 1847 – July 3, 1848	
30		July 4, 1848 – July 3, 1851	
31		July 4, 1851 – July 3, 1858	
32		July 4, 1858 – July 3, 1859	
33		July 4, 1859 – July 3, 1861	Civil War
34		July 4, 1861 – July 3, 1863	
35		July 4, 1863 – July 3, 1865	
36		July 4, 1865 – July 3, 1867	
37		July 4, 1867 – July 3, 1877	
38		July 4, 1877 – July 3, 1890	
43		July 4, 1890 – July 3, 1891	
44		July 4, 1891 – July 3, 1896	
45		July 4, 1896 – July 3, 1908	Sinking of the USS Maine; Spanish–American War; Great White Fleet
46		July 4, 1908 – July 3, 1912	
48		July 4, 1912 – July 3, 1959	World War I; World War II
49		July 4, 1959 – July 3, 1960	
50		July 4, 1960 – October 12, 1975	The 50-star jack was adopted on July 4, 1960, after Hawaii became a state.
0	The First Navy Jack	October 13, 1975 – December 31, 1976	On October 13, 1975, commissioned U.S. Navy warships switched to the First Navy Jack in commemoration of the bicentennial of the United States Navy and the U.S. founding's bicentennial. It was used in this capacity until December 31, 1976, when the 50-star jack was re-adopted.
50		January 1, 1977 – September 10, 2002 (Note: Change ordered on May 31, 2002, and executed on date shown.)	The 50-star jack was re-adopted by commissioned U.S. Navy warships on January 1, 1977. Since August 18, 1980, the First Navy Jack has been used by the active commissioned ship having the longest total period as active in place of the union jack until the ship is decommissioned or transferred to inactive status, whereupon the next such ship inherits the honor.
0	The First Navy Jack	September 11, 2002 – June 4, 2019	Global War on Terrorism: War in Afghanistan; Iraq War; The First Navy Jack was used from 2002 to 2019 by United States Navy vessels only. MSC and non-U.S. Navy vessels, such as those of the U.S. Coast Guard and NOAA, continued to use the 50-star union jack that was adopted in 1960.
50		June 4, 2019 – 2026	The 50-star jack was ordered to be re-adopted by commissioned U.S. Navy warships on February 21, 2019, effective June 4, 2019, to coincide with anniversary of the Battle of Midway. From August 18, 1980, onward, the active commissioned ship having the longest total period as active uses the First Navy Jack instead. Currently that ship is USS Blue Ridge (LCC-19).

== See also ==
- Flag of the United States
- Flags of the United States Armed Forces
