= Noli me tangere (Correggio) =

C. 1525 painting by Correggio

- Do not touch me
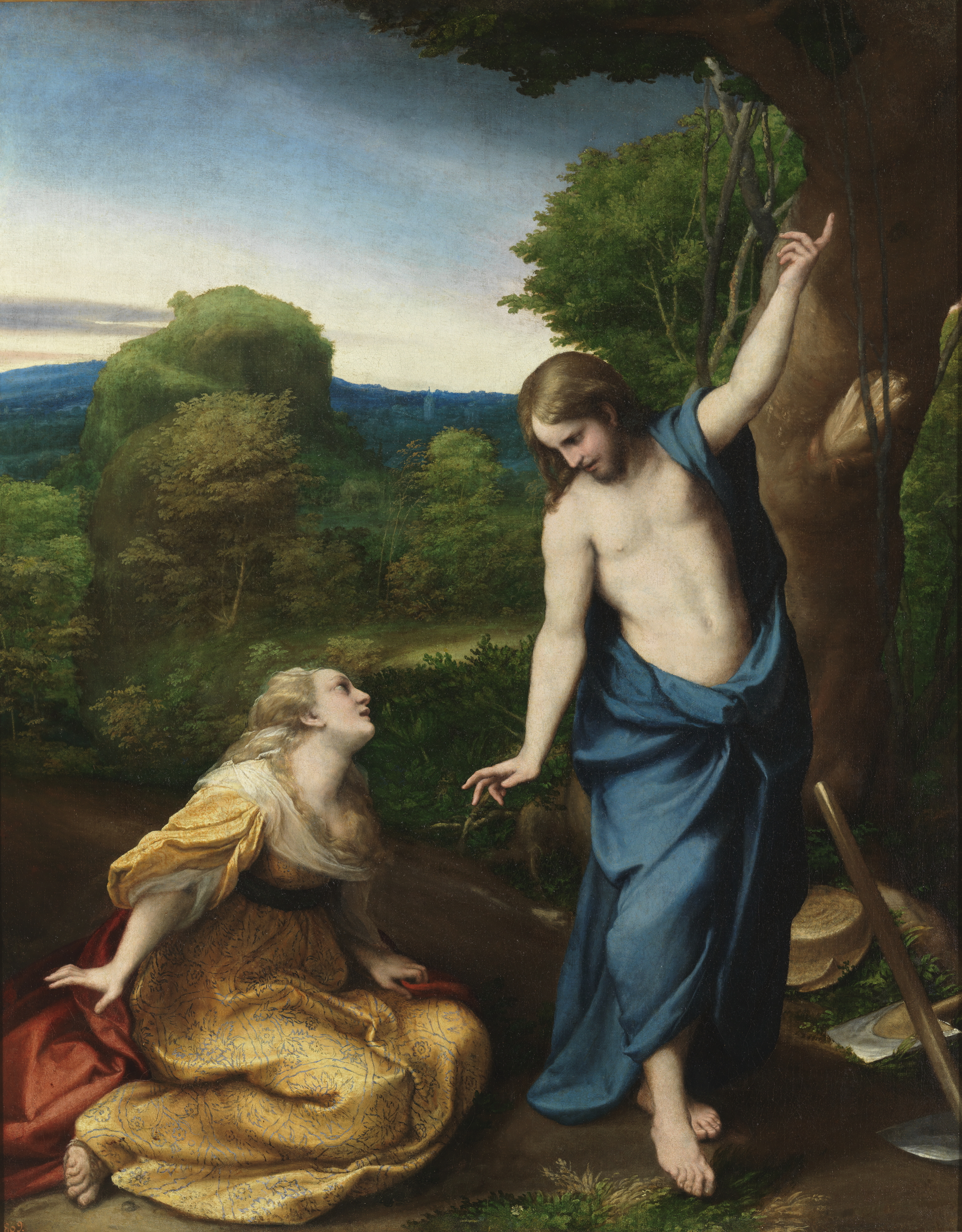
- Year: c.1525
- Dimensions: 130 cm (51 in) × 103 cm (41 in)

Noli me tangere, also known as Christ Appearing to Mary Magdalene in the Garden, is a c. 1525 painting by Correggio which depicts the noli me tangere interaction between Jesus and Mary Magdalene shortly after the Resurrection. It is currently in the collection of the Museo del Prado in Madrid.

== History ==
The first mention of the painting is in the manuscript of Pietro Lamo's Graticola di Bologna, dating to around 1560 and stating it was in the house of the Ercolani counts. It is also praised by Vasari in two passages in his Lives of the Artists of 1568, once in Correggio's own biography and once in that of Girolamo da Carpi. It was seen in Bologna at the end of the 16th century by cardinal Pietro Aldobrandini, who paid a very high price to buy it.

It later passed from the Alobrandini collection to that of Ludovico Ludovisi, as shown by (for example) a postscript to Vasari's Lives by Lelio Guidiccioni: "at present the Most Illustrious Lodovisio has four other marvellous works in one room, seen by me on 7 March 1621". Little more than ten years later Prince Niccolò Ludovisi - "in the necessity of anguish" - decided to curry favour with Philip IV of Spain by giving him the best works from his collection. One of these was the Noli me tangere, which left Rome in the late 1630s or early 1640s, once a copy had been made of it. It arrived in Madrid by the end of 1643, after a brief stop in the Kingdom of Naples. It is now in the Prado Museum.

== Background ==
The scene is taken from events narrated near the end of the Gospel of John, in which Mary Magdalene returns to Jesus' tomb after having found the body missing. There, in her sorrow, she is greeted by two angels and then by Christ himself.

And as she wept, she stooped down, and looked into the sepulchre, and seeth two angels in white sitting, the one at the head, and the other at the feet, where the body of Jesus had lain. And they say unto her, Woman, why weepest thou? She saith unto them. Because they have taken away my Lord, and I know not where they have laid him.

And when she had thus said, she turned herself back, and saw Jesus standing, and knew not that it was Jesus. Jesus saith unto her, Woman, why weepest thou? whom seekest thou? She, supposing him to be the gardener, saith unto him, Sir, if thou have borne him hence, tell me where thou hast laid him, and I will take him away. Jesus saith unto her, Mary. She turned herself, and saith unto him, Rabboni; which is to say, Master.

Jesus saith unto her, Touch me not; for I am not yet ascended to my Father: but go to my brethren, and say unto them, I ascend unto my Father, and your Father; and to my God, and your God.

— John 20:11–17 KJV

== Description ==
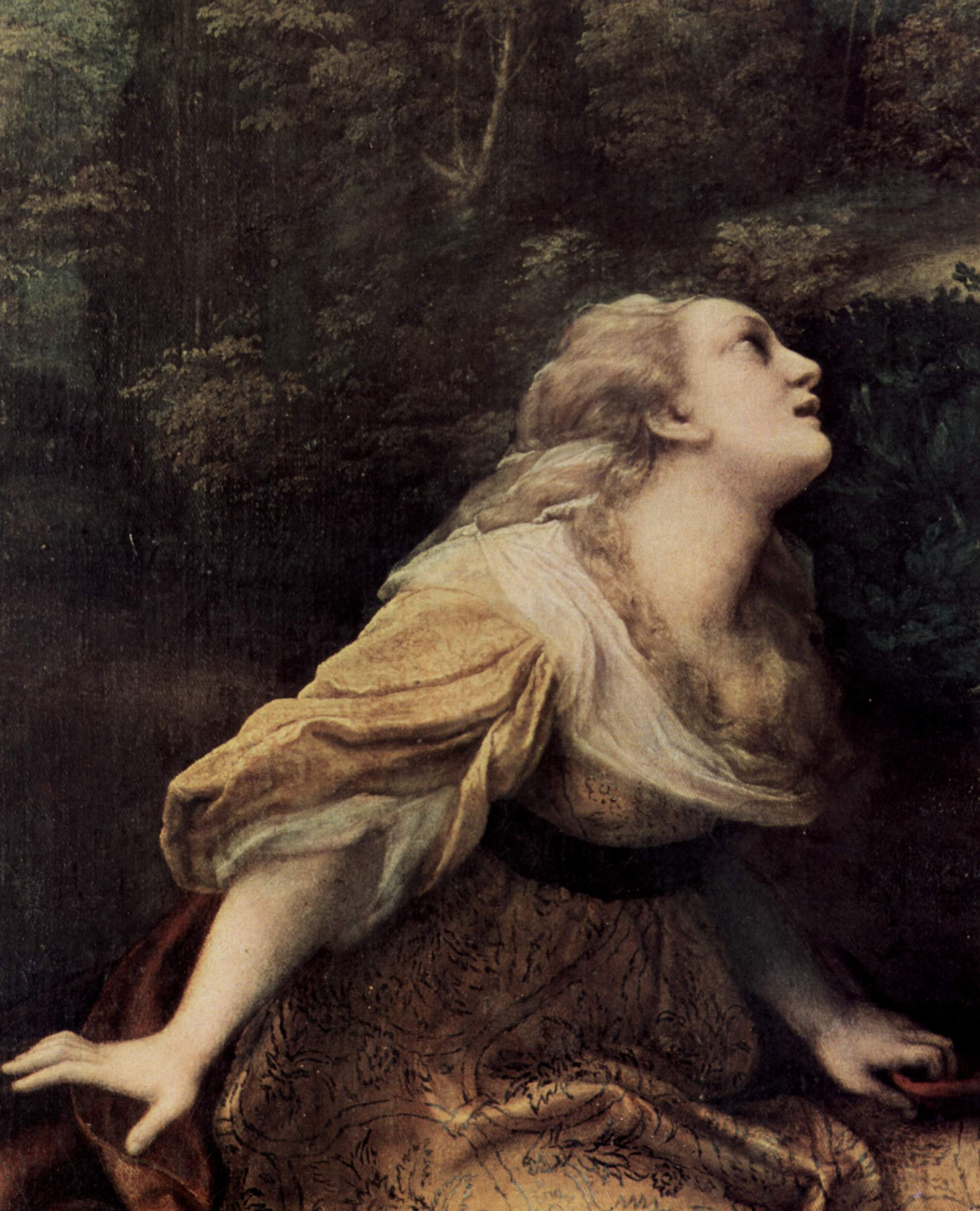
Mary Magdalene (detail)

The picture faithfully illustrates the narrative as told in the Gospel of John. Mary is depicted in the moment of her recognition of Jesus. She is struck to her knees and leans towards him, but Jesus repels her with a slight gesture. Awe-struck, she gazes into his face, while he explains the message she is to carry to the disciples.

Christ wears a heavy mantle knotted at the waist. The upper part is slipping from his shoulders, leaving the torso bare. The style of the body and clothing of Christ bear the influence of Greek sculpture common to Renaissance art. The figure in general features resembles the Christ type which is illustrated in Correggio's Ecce Homo. He is shown without any crucifixion wounds. On the ground beside him are a hoe, spade, and straw hat. These garden tools reference Mary's initial confused supposition that Jesus was a gardener.

Christ's attitude and gesture non-verbally communicate his words from the Gospel. The body sways slightly to one side, as if shrinking from Mary's touch, and he holds his right hand outstretched, keeping her away. This gesture expresses the titular "Touch me not." His left arm points heavenward, indicating his ascension yet to come. His demeanor is gentle and fatherly, looking down into Mary's face with a soft smile.

Mary is richly arrayed in a brocade dress, cut so as to show her neck and arms. Her body and gaze are oriented totally towards Christ. A mass of wavy golden hair falls over her shoulders and upon her bosom. Her expression is that of rapt devotion and complete self-forgetfulness. The background is spacious and picturesque, holding considerable compositional weight. The large tree behind Christ throws his figure into sharp relief.

== Analysis ==
Estelle May Hurll writes: "In painting the figure of the risen Christ the old masters were accustomed to give prominence to the nail prints in hands and feet, and the wound in his side. Correggio has not done this. Such signs of suffering were inconsistent with the joyous nature of his art. The subject of the picture is entirely a happy one, and he has kept out of it all evidences of the crucifixion, emphasizing rather the idea of the ascension."

In some artistic points the picture resembles the Madonna della Scodella. The pose of Christ is similar to that of Joseph, with one arm lifted up, and the other reaching down. Thus is formed the diagonal line which is at the basis of the composition. The right arm of Mary carries the line on to the lower corner of the picture.

== Sources ==
- Hurll, Estelle May (1901). Correggio: A Collection of Fifteen Pictures and a Supposed Portrait of the Painter, with Introduction and Interpretation. Boston and New York: Houghton Mifflin Company, The Riverside Press Cambridge. pp. 73–78.
