= Gadsden flag =

Historical American flag

- Use: Banner
- Proportion: Varies, generally 2:3
- Adopted: December 20, 1775
- Design: A yellow banner charged with a yellow spiraled timber rattlesnake facing toward the hoist sitting upon a patch of lush green grass, with thirteen rattles, representing the thirteen colonies, the words "DONT TREAD ON ME" [sic] positioned below the snake in black font
- Designed by: Christopher Gadsden

The Gadsden flag is a historical American flag with a yellow field depicting a timber rattlesnake coiled and ready to strike. Beneath the rattlesnake are the words "Dont Tread on Me" [sic]. (Note: During the 18th century, contractions were often written without an apostrophe.) Some modern versions of the flag include an apostrophe in the word "don't". Originating in the American Revolution, the flag has in modern days become a symbol of American and international right-libertarianism, and later the Tea Party movement.

The flag is named after Christopher Gadsden, a South Carolinian delegate to the Continental Congress, slaver and brigadier general in the Continental Army, who designed the flag in 1775 during the American Revolution. He gave the flag to Commodore Esek Hopkins, and it was unfurled on the main mast of Hopkins' flagship USS Alfred on December 20, 1775. Two days later, Congress made Hopkins commander-in-chief of the Continental Navy. He adopted the Gadsden banner as his personal flag, flying it from the mainmast of the flagship while he was aboard. The Continental Marines also flew the flag during the early part of the war.

The rattlesnake was a symbol of the unity of the Thirteen Colonies at the start of the Revolutionary War, and it had a long history as a political symbol in America. Benjamin Franklin used it for his Join, or Die woodcut in 1754. Gadsden intended his flag to serve as a physical symbol of the American Revolution's ideals.

The flag has been described as the "most popular symbol of the American Revolution". Its design proclaims an assertive warning of vigilance and unity of purpose in the common defense. This has led it to be associated with the ideas of individualism and liberty. It is often used in the United States as a symbol of right-libertarianism, classical liberalism, and small government, as well as for distrust or defiance against authorities and government.

== Appearance and symbolism ==
=== Variations in appearance ===
Many variations of the Gadsden flag exist. The motto may or may not include an apostrophe in the word "Don't"; the typeface used for the motto may or may not feature serifs. The rattlesnake is sometimes shown as resting on a green ground; representations dating from 1885 and 1917 do not display anything below the rattlesnake. The rattlesnake usually faces to the left, and the early representations mentioned above face left. However, some versions of the flag show the snake facing to the right.

=== History of the rattlesnake symbol in America ===
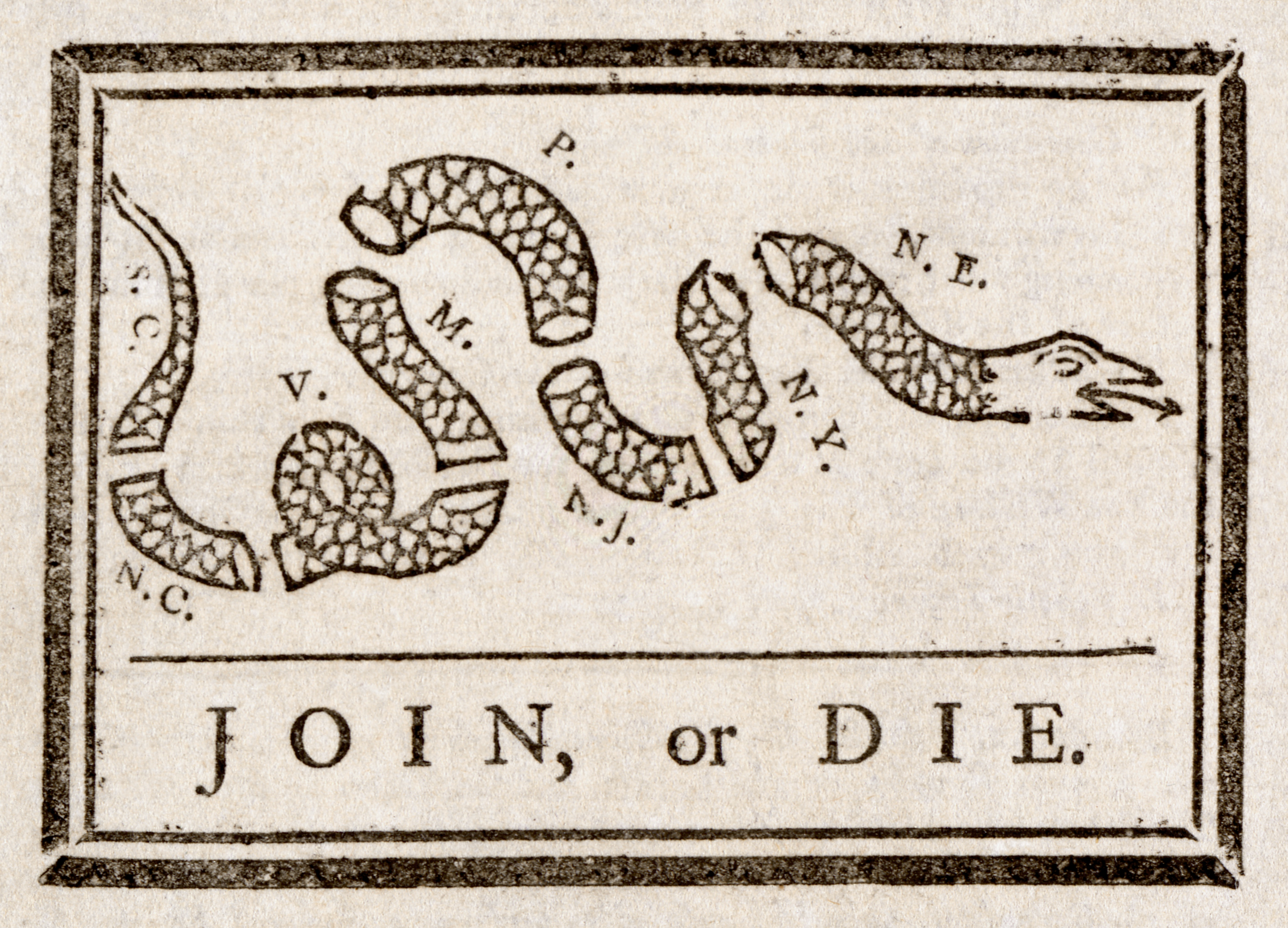
Benjamin Franklin's 1754 JOIN, or DIE. cartoon

The timber rattlesnake can be found in the area of the original Thirteen Colonies. Like the bald eagle, part of its significance is that it was unique to the Americas, serving as a means of showing a separate identity from the Old World. Its use as a symbol of the American colonies can be traced back to the publications of Benjamin Franklin. In 1751, he made the first reference to the rattlesnake in a satirical commentary published in The Pennsylvania Gazette. It became the policy of the British Parliament to send convicted criminals to Britain's North American colonies (primarily the Province of Georgia), so Franklin suggested that Americans thank Parliament by sending rattlesnakes to Britain.

In 1754, during the French and Indian War, Franklin published JOIN, or DIE, a woodcut of a snake cut into eight sections. It represented the colonies, with New England joined as the head and South Carolina as the tail, following their order along the coast. This was the first political cartoon published in an American newspaper.

In 1774, Paul Revere added Franklin's iconic cartoon to the nameplate of Isaiah Thomas's paper, the Massachusetts Spy, depicted there as fighting a British griffin.

In December 1775, Benjamin Franklin published an essay in the Pennsylvania Journal under the pseudonym "American Guesser" in which he suggested that the rattlesnake was a good symbol for the American spirit and its valuation for vigilance, assertiveness, individualism, unity, and liberty:

[T]here was painted a Rattle-Snake, with this modest motto under it, "Don't tread on me." [...] she has no eye-lids. She may therefore be esteemed an emblem of vigilance. She never begins an attack, nor, when once engaged, ever surrenders [...] The Rattle-Snake is solitary, and associates with her kind only when it is necessary for their preservation [...] 'Tis curious and amazing to observe how distinct and independent of each other the rattles of this animal are, and yet how firmly they are united together, so as never to be separated but by breaking them to pieces. [...] The power of fascination attributed to her, by a generous construction, may be understood to mean, that those who consider the liberty and blessings which America affords, and once come over to her, never afterwards leave her, but spend their lives with her.

Flag of the Culpeper Minutemen

The rattlesnake symbol was first officially adopted by the Continental Congress in 1778 when it approved the design for the seal of the War Office. At the top center of the seal is a rattlesnake holding a banner that says, "This we'll defend". This design of the War Office seal was carried forward—with some minor modifications—into the subsequent designs as well as the Department of the Army's seal, emblem and flag. As such, some variation of a rattlesnake symbol has been in continuous official use by the US Army for over 243 years.

Other American flags that use a rattlesnake motif include The United Companies of the Train of Artillery of the Town of Providence, the First Navy Jack, and the Culpeper Minutemen flag, among others.

In the 21st century, the Gadsden Flag has been used by supporters of the Tea Party movement.

== History ==
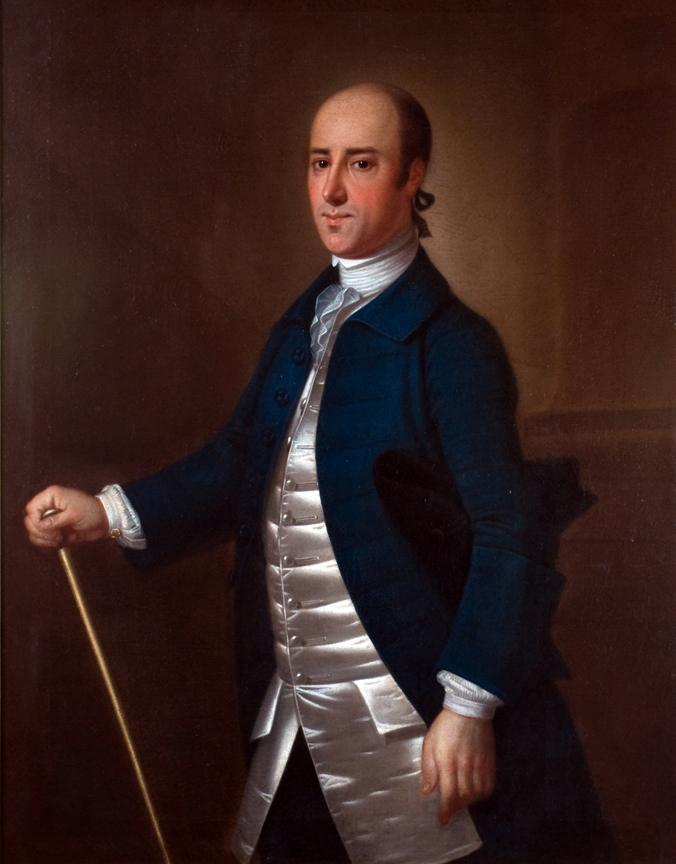
Christopher Gadsden, designer of the flag, portrait by Jeremiah Theus, c. 1760–1770

George Washington established the Continental Navy in 1775 as Commander in Chief of the Continental Forces, before Esek Hopkins was named Commodore of the Navy. The first ships were used to intercept incoming transport ships carrying war supplies to the British in the colonies in order to supply the Continental Army, which was desperately undersupplied in the opening years of the American Revolutionary War.

Continental Colonel Christopher Gadsden represented South Carolina in the Congress, and he was one of seven members of the Marine Committee outfitting the first naval mission. Paul Aron described Gadsden as a "leading advocate of an American navy." The first Marines carried drums painted yellow and depicting a coiled rattlesnake with thirteen rattles along with the motto "Don't Tread on Me." This is one of the first recorded mentions of the flag's symbolism. On April 27, 1775 a flag with the coiled rattlesnake and motto was carried by David Jameson from Culpeper County.

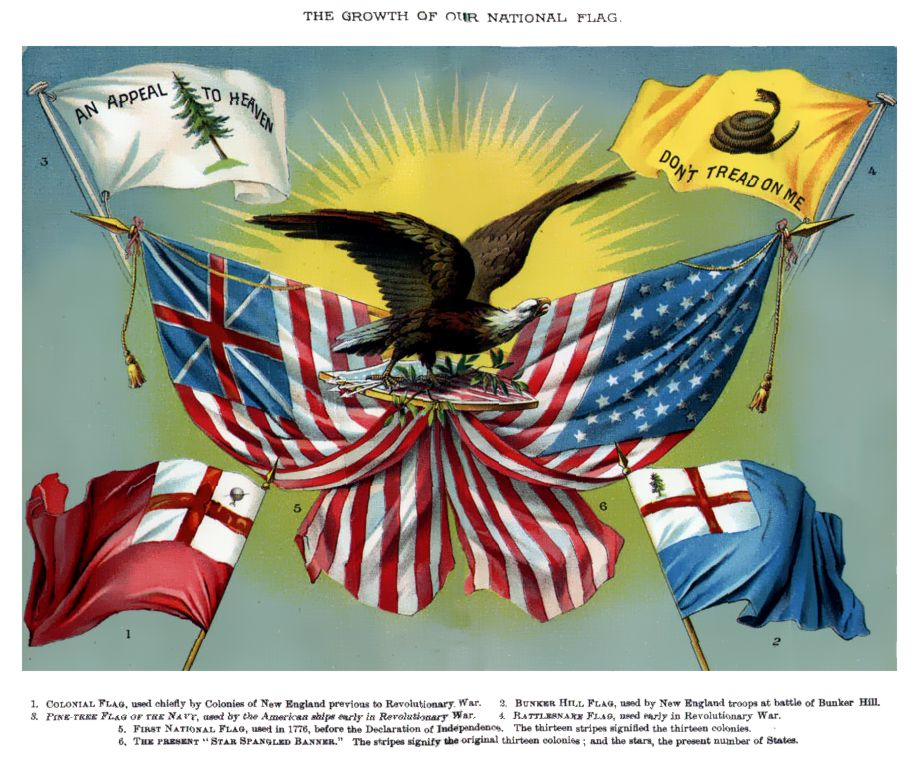
Gadsden's flag in an 1885 schoolbook

Gadsden decided that the American navy needed a distinctive flag and took it upon himself to make one in 1775. He gave Commodore Esek Hopkins a yellow rattlesnake flag to serve as his personal standard on USS Alfred, the flagship of America's first navy squadron. Gadsden intended the design to serve as a physical symbol of the American Revolution's ideals. The rattlesnake was seen in Charleston, South Carolina as a "noble and useful" animal that gave warning before it attacked. Before being appointed to lead the Navy, Hopkins had led The United Companies of the Train of Artillery of the Town of Providence, a unit that flew a flag similar to Gadsden's. He unfurled the Gadsden flag on the main mast of USS Alfred on December 20, 1775, while the ship was at anchor in Chesapeake Bay. Whenever he was aboard, Hopkins flew the flag from the mainmast of the flagship as his personal banner. Alfred was also the first recorded ship to fly the first national flag of the United States, when Senior Lieutenant John Paul Jones hoisted it on December 3, 1775, while the ship floated in the Delaware River near Philadelphia.

By winter 1775, the South Carolina Provincial Congress expected that British forces would attack Charleston and recalled Gadsden home from Congress in Philadelphia to command the 1st South Carolina Regiment. By January 14, Gadsden had both his orders to return home and permission from the Continental Congress to leave. On Friday, February 9, 1776, he presented an example of his yellow rattlesnake flag to president of the Congress William Henry Drayton.

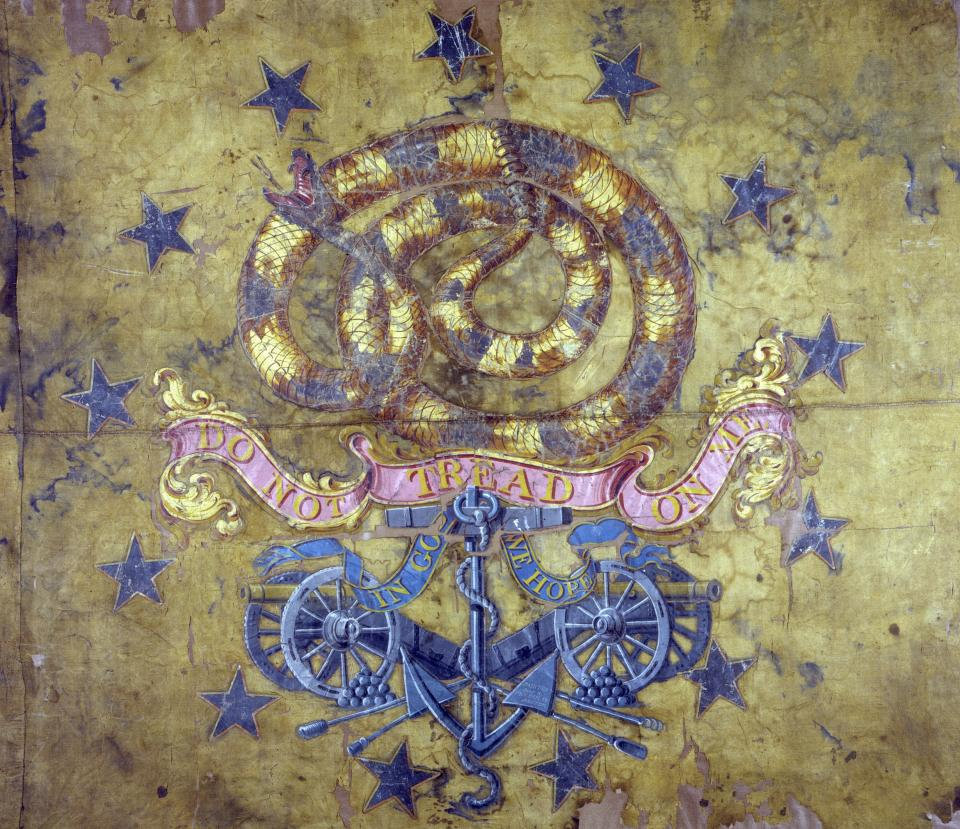
Flag of the Providence United Train of Artillery

Gadsden's presentation of the rattlesnake flag was recorded in the South Carolina congressional journals on February 9, 1776:

Col. Gadsden presented to the Congress an elegant standard, such as is to be used by the commander in chief of the American Navy; being a yellow field, with a lively representation of a rattlesnake in the middle in the attitude of going to strike and these words underneath, "Don't tread on me."

=== Use during the Civil War ===
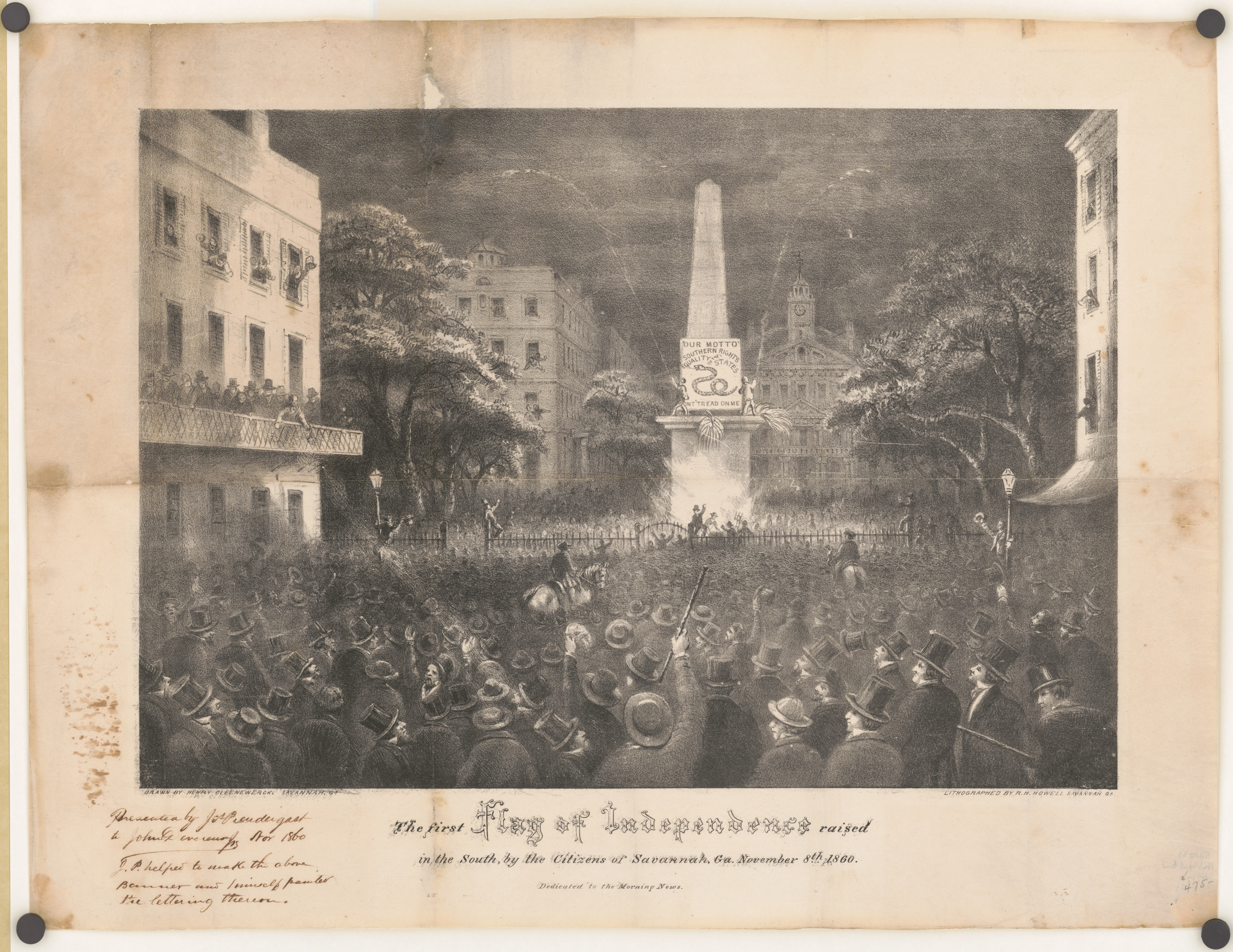
A variation of the Gadsden flag appears at a pro-secession rally in Savannah, Georgia, at the onset of the American Civil War in 1860

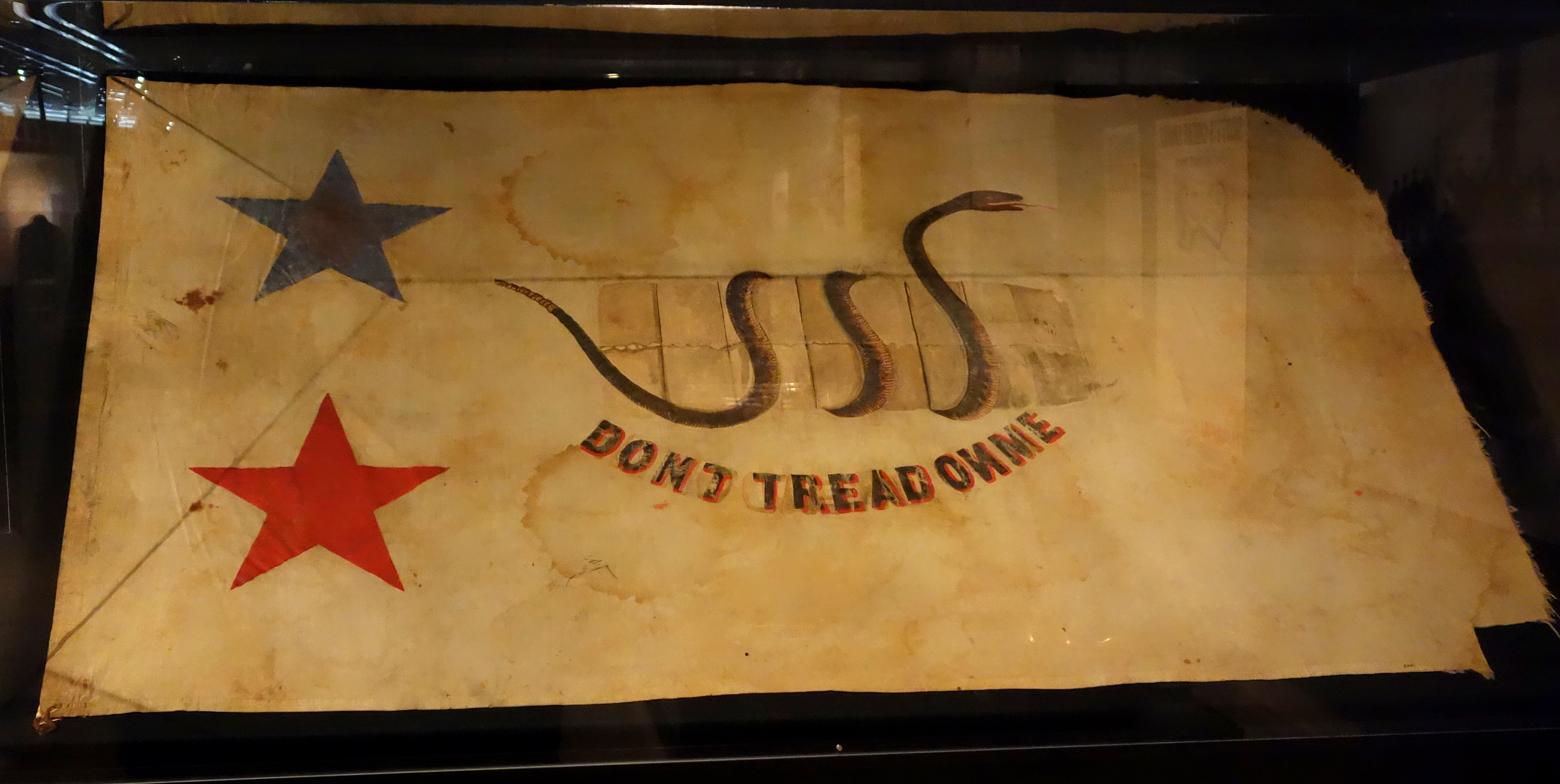
A variation of the Gadsden flag flown by the Confederate Navy

Between 1860 and 1862, the meaning of the Gadsden flag was disputed between pro- (later, the Confederacy) and anti-slavery (later, the Union) sides, with the latter side ending up abandoning the flag "because Confederates had irreparably tainted it" and the former making it into their unofficial flag.

The Union side would counter the Gadsden flag with images of snakes being stomped, stabbed, and eaten by eagles; in response, the Confederacy would abandon it for the Southern Cross battle flag. In 1862, Abraham Lincoln was given a 34 star American flag with the inscription: "The heel of the old flagstaff shall bruise the rattle-snake’s head," in gold.

In 1861, a ship from Georgia entered Boston Harbor flying a version of the Gadsden Flag with 15 stars on it signifying the 15 slave states. The captain removed the flag after a large and angry crowd gathered, who then destroyed it. The flags even flew as far west as El Dorado, California.

== Modern use ==
Map of states (colored yellow) that offer Gadsden flag specialty license plates

For historical reasons, the Gadsden flag is still popularly flown in Charleston, South Carolina, the city where Christopher Gadsden first presented the flag and where it was commonly used during the revolution, along with the blue and white crescent flag of pre-Civil War South Carolina.

The Gadsden flag has become a popular specialty license plate in several states. As of 2022, the following states offer the option of obtaining a Gadsden flag specialty license plate: Alabama, Arizona, Florida, Kansas, Maryland, Missouri, Montana, Oklahoma, South Carolina, Tennessee, Texas, and Virginia.

=== Use as a libertarian symbol ===
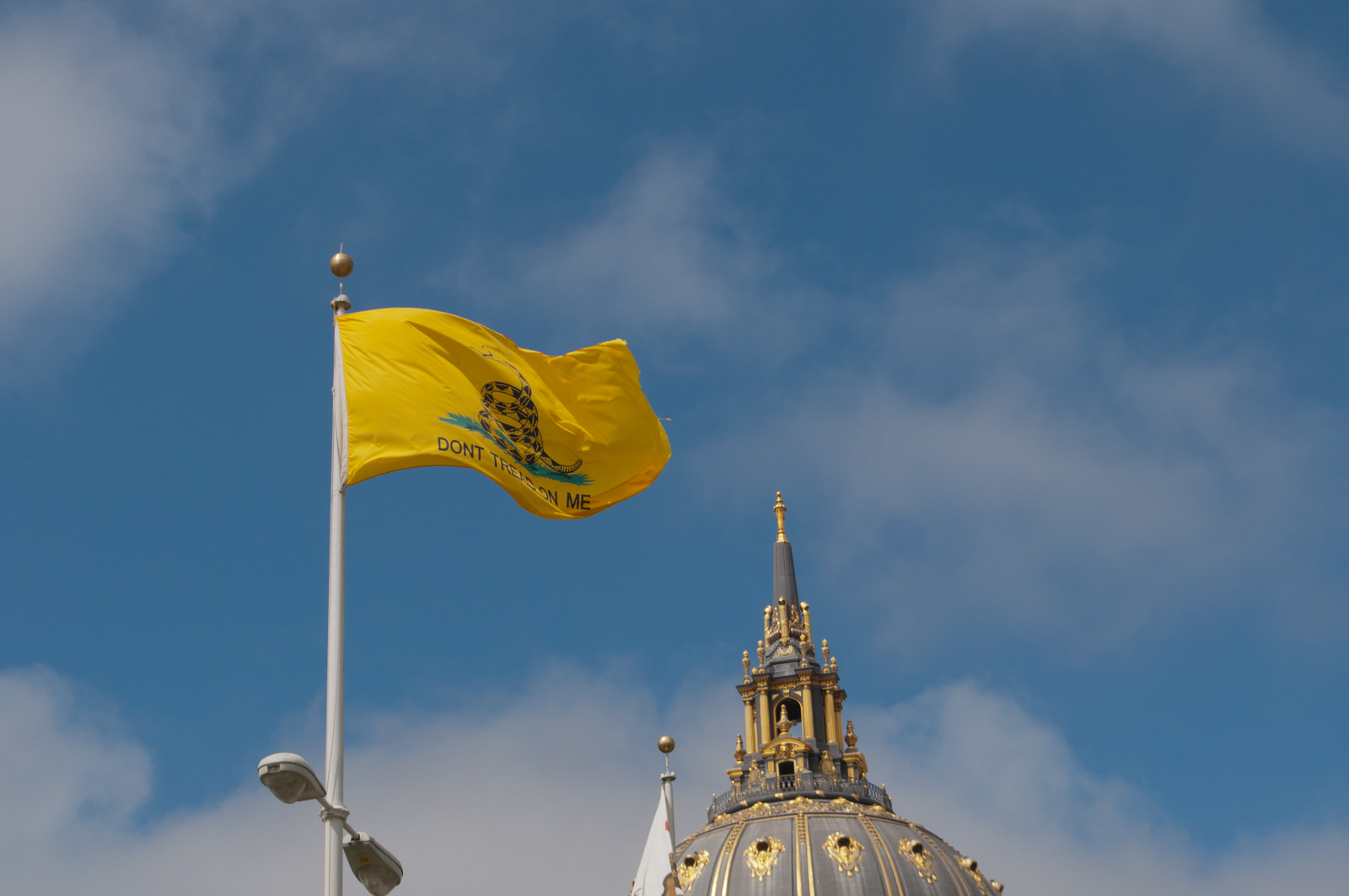
The Gadsden flag flying over the San Francisco Civic Center Plaza.

In the 1970s, libertarians began using the Gadsden flag as a symbol to represent individual rights and limited government. The flag's prominent yellow or gold color is also strongly associated with libertarianism. The libertarian Free State Project in New Hampshire uses a modified version of the flag with the snake replaced by a porcupine, a symbol of the libertarian movement.

=== Use by the right ===
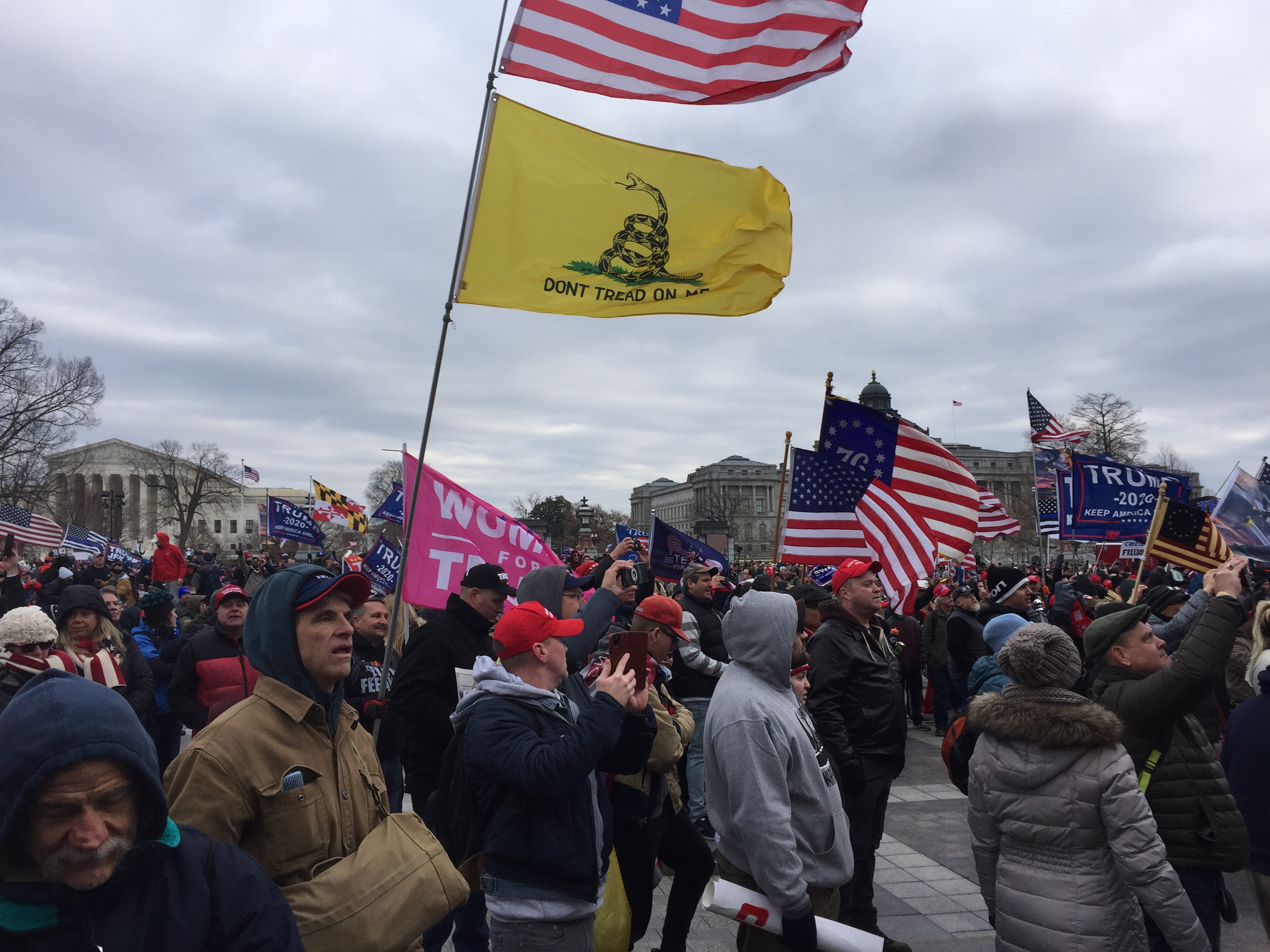
Gadsden flag flown in the area of demonstration during the January 6, 2021, storming of the U.S. Capitol.

Beginning in 2009, the Gadsden flag was widely used as a protest symbol by protesters who supported the American Tea Party movement. It was also displayed by members of Congress at Tea Party rallies. In some cases, the flag was ruled to be a political, rather than a historic or military, symbol due to the strong Tea Party connection.

The Gadsden flag was featured prominently in a report related to the January 6, 2021, attack of the United States Capitol. (Note: Thirty-four-year-old Rosanne Boyland carried one when she collapsed from an amphetamine overdose and died in the Capitol.)

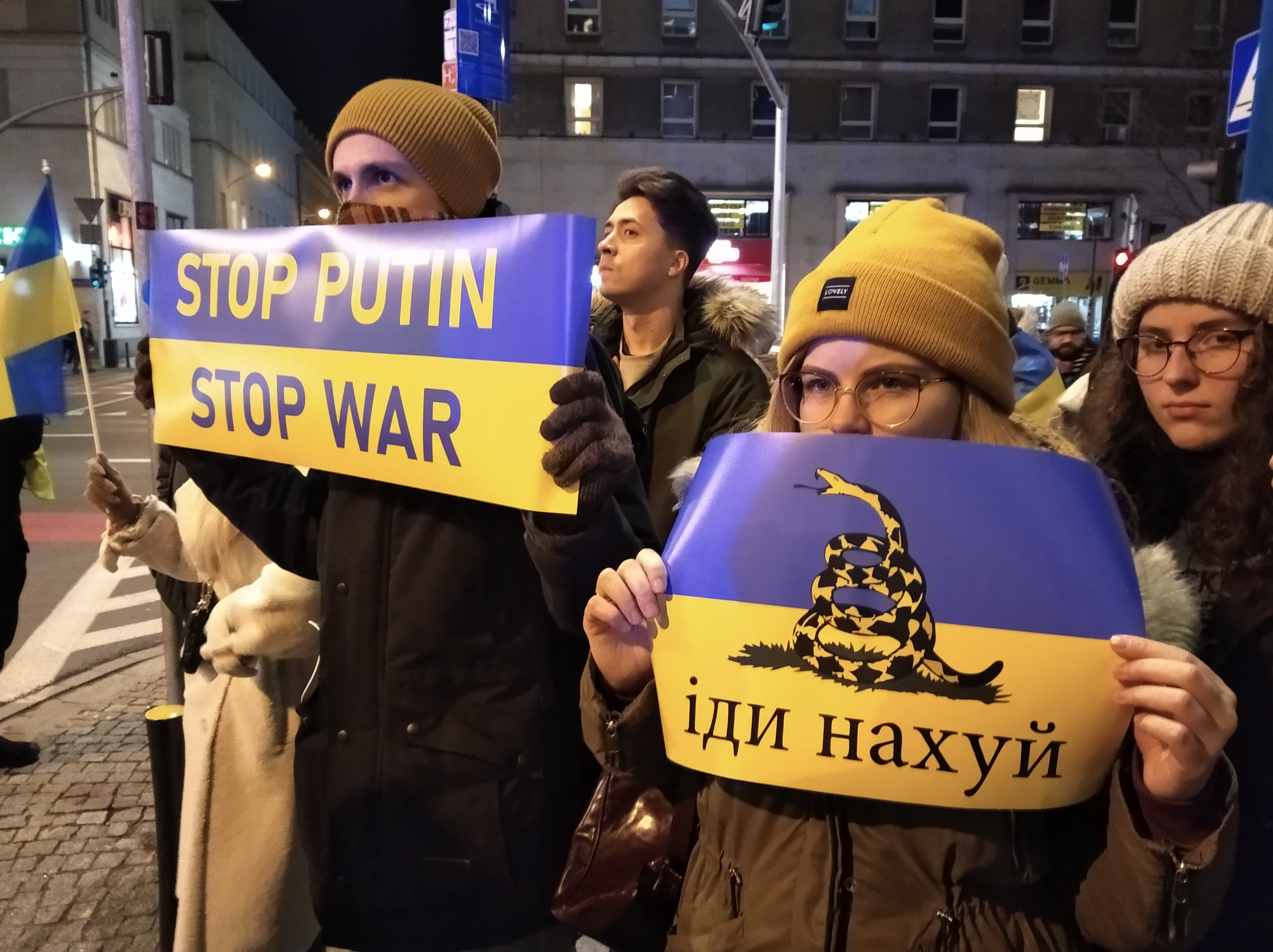
Stop wojnie - Gadsden flag at anti-war rally in support of Ukraine.

=== Use by the left ===
In the mid-1970s, the New Left People's Bicentennial Commission used the Gadsden flag symbolism on buttons and literature.

Following Dobbs v. Jackson Women's Health Organization, which struck down Roe v. Wade, abortion rights activists were seen at a Texas rally carrying a version of the flag with the snake in the shape of a human uterus.

Rainbow Gadsden flag

Street Patrol, a 1990s LGBTQ+ self-defense group affiliated with Queer Nation/San Francisco, used as its logo a coiled snake over a triangle holding a ribbon with the motto "Don't Tread on Me". Some libertarians use a version of the flag with the snake and motto placed over a rainbow flag. Following the 2016 Orlando nightclub shooting, posters containing a rainbow Gadsden flag inscribed with "#ShootBack" were placed around West Hollywood.

=== Use in a terrorist act ===
In 2014, the flag was used by Jerad and Amanda Miller, the perpetrators of the 2014 Las Vegas shootings who killed two police officers and a citizen. The Millers reportedly placed the Gadsden Flag on the corpse of one of the officers they killed.

=== Legal cases involving the Gadsden flag ===
In March 2013, the Gadsden flag was raised at a vacant armory building in New Rochelle, New York, without permission from city officials. The city ordered its removal and the United Veterans Memorial & Patriotic Association, which had maintained the U.S. flag at the armory, filed suit against the city. A federal judge dismissed the case, rejecting the United Veterans' First Amendment argument and ruling that the flagpole in question was city property and thus did not represent private speech.

In 2014, a US Postal Service employee filed a complaint about a coworker repeatedly wearing a hat with a Gadsden Flag motif at work. Postal service administration dismissed the complaint, but the United States Equal Employment Opportunity Commission reversed the decision and called for a careful investigation. The EEOC issued a statement clarifying that it did not make any decision that the Gadsden flag was a "racist symbol," or that wearing a depiction of it constituted racial discrimination.

In 2023, a seventh grader at The Vanguard School in Colorado Springs, Colorado, was removed from school for wearing several patches that were "in violation of the school’s dress code policy" including a Gadsden flag patch. After high-profile backlash against the decision, including criticism from Governor Jared Polis, the school reversed its decision.

The flag was found in the room of the perpetrator of the 2026 Kraków shooting, although the motive and ideology of the perpetrator was not established.

=== Use outside the U.S. ===
The Gadsden flag has been used by supporters of Argentine right-libertarian president Javier Milei. During Milei's inauguration, there were Gadsden flags flown which is one of the first times the flag was flown with notability in a foreign inauguration.

In Poland, the libertarian Youth of the Future (Młodzież Przyszłości) association used a combination of Gadsden flags and pride flags at their Inequality March event in central Warsaw in 2020, receiving support from the presidential candidate Paweł Tanajno. The protest raised LGBTQ rights, liberal economic and men's health demands, citing oppressive state law and "patriarchal culture".

=== Parodies ===
"No Step on Snek" parody flag

Parodies and pastiches of the Gadsden flag exist; one common design replaces the "Don't tread on me" motto with "No Step on Snek", sometimes paired with a crudely drawn snake.

== Appearances in popular culture ==
The Gadsden flag has made numerous appearances in popular culture, particularly in film, television, video games, music, and sports.

- In the 2006 CBS apocalyptic drama series Jericho, Gadsden flags are shown several times, most notably in the series finale when Jericho's mayor, Gray Anderson (Michael Gaston), replaces the town hall's "Allied States of America" flag with a Gadsden flag.
- In the 2009 NBC mockumentary sitcom Parks and Recreation, Ron Swanson (Nick Offerman) has a miniature Gadsden flag in his office.
- In the 2023 HBO apocalyptic drama series The Last of Us, Bill (Nick Offerman) has a Gadsden flag in his house.
- American heavy metal band Metallica recorded a song called "Don't Tread on Me" on their self-titled fifth studio album, released in 1991. The album cover features a dark-gray picture of a coiled rattlesnake like the one found on the Gadsden Flag.

== See also ==
- Don't Tread on Me
- Pine Tree Flag
- First Navy Jack
