= Kit and the Outlaws =

American garage rock band

Kit and the Outlaws were an American garage rock band, active in the mid-1960s. Their music was typical of the era, using familiar riffs, not unlike those used by more well-known bands such as The Rumours, The Weeds, or The Vibrations.

Their most famous song is "Don't Tread on Me". An anthem of rebellion, the song is adapted from a classic riff used by numerous garage bands, taken from the song "Hang on Sloopy". It was later covered by punk band The Cramps, albeit with different lyrics, as "Nest of the Cukoo Bird". It was later called one of the greatest punk singles ever recorded.

Joe Jesmer (born Joseph Phillip Jesmer on December 2, 1947, in Dallas, Texas) died on July 27, 2016, at age 68.

== Band members ==
- Kit Massengill (vocals, guitar)
- Jerry Colwell (vocals, keyboards)
- Alan Ravkind (a.k.a. Alan Rafkin) (bass)
- Joe Jesmer (drums)
