= First Navy Jack =

United States naval jack (1975–1976, 2002–2019)

United States of America
- The "First Navy Jack", currently flown only by the oldest active warship in the U.S. Navy.
- The First Navy Jack
- Adopted: October 13, 1975 (as U.S. naval jack); August 18, 1980 (for oldest U.S. warships); September 11, 2002 (as U.S. naval jack)
- Relinquished: December 31, 1976 (as U.S. naval jack); June 4, 2019 (as U.S. naval jack)
- Design: 13 horizontal stripes of alternating red and white, charged with a rattlesnake and inscribed on the lowest white stripe: "DONT [sic] TREAD ON ME".

The First Navy Jack was the naval jack of the United States from 1975 to 1976 and again from 2002 to 2019. It was authorized by the U.S. Navy and was flown from the jackstaff of commissioned vessels of the U.S. Navy while moored pierside or at anchor. Since then, it is used only as a naval jack by the oldest active warship in the U.S. Navy. (Note: USS Constitution, technically in active service, is excluded.) The design is purported to be that of the first U.S. naval jack, flown soon after independence.

The First Navy Jack was replaced as the U.S. naval jack by the U.S. Union Jack (consisting of white stars on a blue field, not to be confused with the flag of the United Kingdom, also commonly called "the Union Jack") on June 4, 2019, by order of the chief of naval operations.

== History ==
In late 1775, as the first ships of the Continental Navy readied in the Delaware River, Commodore Esek Hopkins issued an instruction directing his vessels to fly a "striped" jack and ensign. The exact design of these flags is unknown. But, since about 1880, this jack has traditionally been depicted as consisting of thirteen red and white stripes charged with an uncoiled rattlesnake and the motto "Dont Tread on Me" [sic]; this design appeared in a color plate in Admiral George Henry Preble's influential History of the Flag of the United States.

In 1778, John Adams and Benjamin Franklin wrote a letter to the ambassador of the Kingdom of Sicily, thanking him for allowing entry of revolutionary ships into Sicilian ports. The letter describes the new flag of the colonies according to the 1777 Flag Resolution, but also describes a flag of "South Carolina, a rattlesnake, in the middle of the thirteen stripes."

The rattlesnake had long been a symbol in the colonies of resistance and defiance to the Crown. The phrase "Don't Tread on Me" may have been coined during the American Revolutionary War, a variant perhaps of an earlier image. A snake severed in segments and labelled with the names of the colonies and the legend "Join, or Die", had first been published in Benjamin Franklin's Pennsylvania Gazette in 1754, as a political cartoon reflecting on the Albany Congress.

The rattlesnake (specifically, the Timber Rattlesnake) is especially significant and symbolic to the American Revolution. The rattle has thirteen layers, signifying the original Thirteen Colonies. Additionally, the snake does not strike until provoked, a characteristic expressed by the phrase "Don't tread on me" (see Gadsden flag).

Typically the flag's rattlesnake is depicted with red scales on its back, but some have depicted the snake as all-gold.

== Modern use ==
=== Shipboard ===
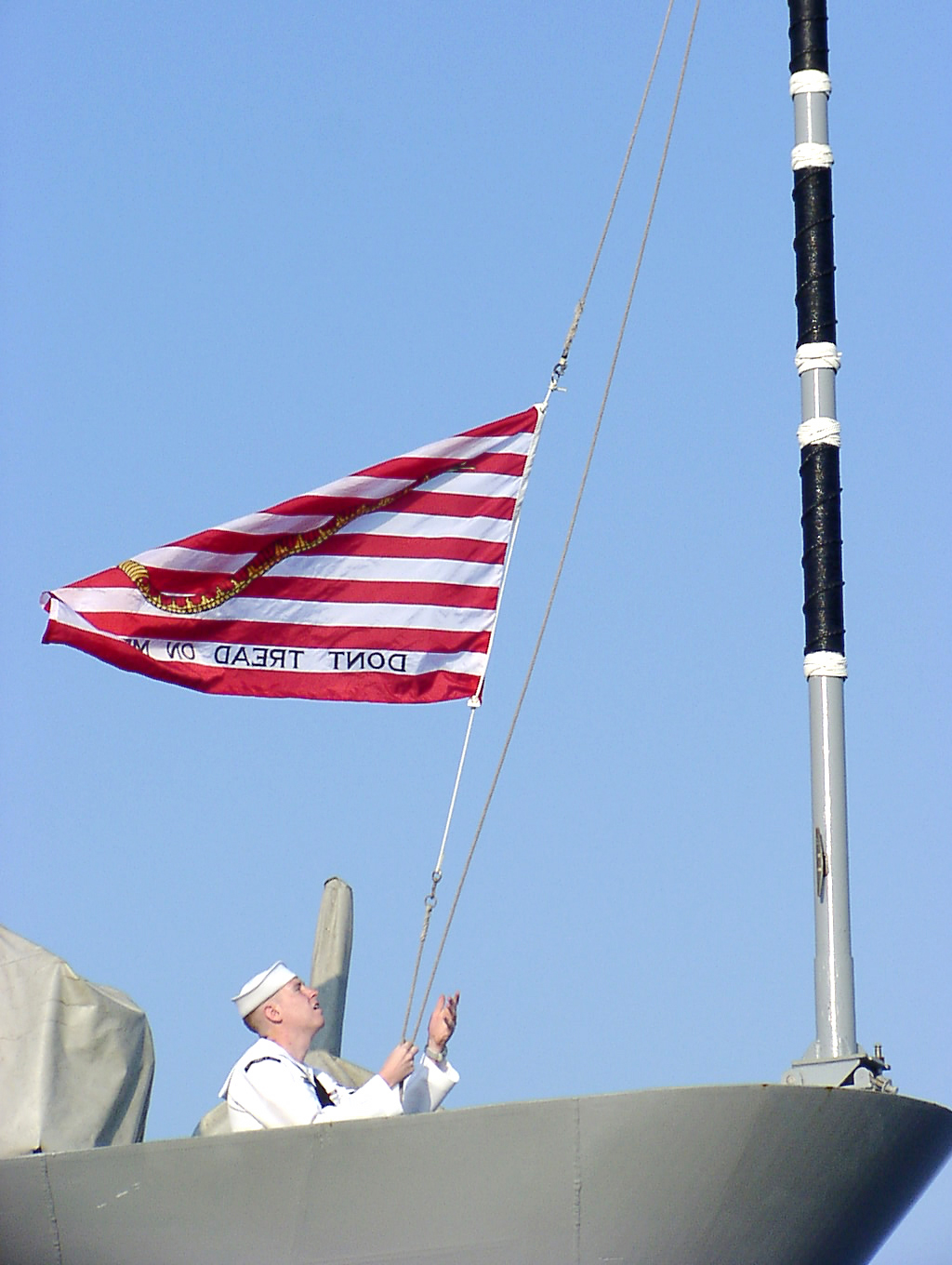
Raising of the "Navy Jack" for the first time at morning colors, on September 11, 2002, aboard the guided missile cruiser Thomas S. Gates in honor of those killed in the September 11, 2001 attacks.

Modern use of the flag is usually traced to 1976, when the United States celebrated its Bicentennial. All commissioned naval vessels were directed to fly the First Navy Jack for that calendar year while moored or anchored, and their commanding officers were authorized to retain and fly it thereafter.

The flag that had been used before, and afterward was the standard, was the fifty-star Union Jack. In 1980, Secretary of the Navy Edward Hidalgo directed that the warship or fleet auxiliary (e.g. a vessel designated as a "United States Ship" or "USS") with the longest active status shall display the First Navy Jack until decommissioned or transferred to inactive service.

The status of the flag was changed on May 31, 2002. Navy secretary Gordon England issued SECNAV Instruction 10520.6, directing all warships and auxiliaries of the U.S. Navy to fly the First Naval Jack as a "temporary substitution" for the Jack of the United States "during the Global War on Terrorism". The idea was based on a post-9/11 suggestion from retired Captain Brayton Harris, who in 1975 and 1976 had been Special Assistant to the Secretary of the Navy for the bicentennial. Most vessels made the symbolic switch on September 11, 2002 during the first anniversary of the terrorist attacks. Not all US vessels flew the flag while moored or at anchor. Those that did not included commissioned vessels of the U.S. Coast Guard designated as "United States Coast Guard Cutter" ("USCGC"), USCG patrol boats, vessels of the National Oceanographic and Atmospheric Administration, and predominantly civilian-crewed vessels of the U.S. Navy's Military Sealift Command.

On February 21, 2019, the chief of naval operations, Admiral John Richardson, announced the blue Union Jack would be returned to nearly all commissioned warships of the U.S. Navy. He restored the 1980 practice of reserving the First Navy Jack to the longest active status warship. This order disregards the USS Constitution, which technically is the oldest in the Navy but is used only for ceremonial purposes, and the USS Pueblo, which was captured by North Korea in 1968 and is currently a museum ship though is still commissioned in the U.S. Navy. The honor of "oldest ship" in the Fleet (Note: In modern times (post-1980 in this case).) was conferred on the following U.S. Navy vessels:

Ship name	Type	Commission date	Decommission date	Years as oldest	Age (Note: This column reflects the ship's age at the given decommissioning date.)	Homeport	Fate
USS Dixie (AD-14)	Destroyer tender	April 25, 1940	June 15, 1982	1981–1982	42	Subic Bay, Philippines	Scrapped
USS Prairie (AD-15)	Destroyer tender	August 5, 1940	March 26, 1993	1982–1993	52	—N/a	Scrapped
USS Orion (AS-18)	Submarine tender	September 30, 1943	September 3, 1993	1993	50	Newport, Rhode Island	Scrapped
USS Sierra (AD-18)	Destroyer tender	March 20, 1944	October 15, 1993	1993	49	Charleston, South Carolina	Scrapped
USS Jason (AR-8)	Repair ship	June 19, 1944	June 24, 1995 (Note: USS Jason was the last remaining U.S. naval commissioned ship to serve in World War II.)	1993-1995	51	Pearl Harbor, Hawaii; San Diego, California	Scrapped
USS Mauna Kea (AE-22)	Ammunition ship	March 30, 1957	June 30, 1995	1995	38	Concord, California	Sunk as target
USS Independence (CV-62)	Aircraft carrier	January 10, 1959	September 30, 1998	1995–1998	39	Naval Station Norfolk, Virginia; San Diego, California; Yokosuka, Japan	Scrapped
USS Kitty Hawk (CV-63)	Aircraft carrier	April 29, 1961	May 12, 2009	1998–2009	48	Bremerton, Washington	Undergoing scrapping
USS Enterprise (CVN-65)	Aircraft carrier	November 25, 1961	December 1, 2012	2009–2012	51	Naval Station Norfolk, Virginia	Awaiting scrapping
USS Denver (LPD-9)	Amphibious transport dock	October 26, 1968	August 14, 2014	2012–2014	45	Sasebo, Japan	Sunk as target
USS Blue Ridge (LCC-19)	Amphibious command ship	November 14, 1970	—N/a	2014–present	53	Yokosuka, Japan	Active

=== Other U.S. Navy uses ===
Since September 11, 2002, U.S. Navy installations and facilities ashore have been allowed but not required to fly the First Navy Jack from multi-halyard gaff-rigged flagpoles when the United States ensign is also flown.

The First Navy Jack has also been authorized for wear as a patch by sailors and naval officers on flight suits and certain versions of the Navy Working Uniform (NWU), including sailors and naval officers wearing the Army Combat Uniform (ACU) while assigned to and serving with Army units, at the discretion of the local Army commander. For the NWU and ACU, the patch is typically worn on the opposite sleeve as the U.S. flag.

This First Navy Jack, along with the Serapis flag, is also featured on the crest of the Arleigh Burke-class guided missile destroyer USS John Paul Jones.

During the War in Afghanistan, U.S. Navy sailors and officers assigned to the International Security Assistance Force (ISAF) were authorized to wear the First Navy Jack on their MultiCam-patterned Army Combat Uniform (ACU) on the right sleeve, below the U.S. flag.

== Non-military uses ==
Like other snake flags, the First Navy Jack has been used by non-Navy people in protest or commemoration. For example, opponents to a smoking ban in Franklin, Indiana, flew Navy Jacks outside their homes and businesses. A First Navy Jack flag was also placed at a makeshift memorial on Boylston Street after the Boston Marathon bombing.

== See also ==
- Ensign of the United States
- Bibliography of early United States naval history
