= Be fruitful and multiply =

Biblical phrase

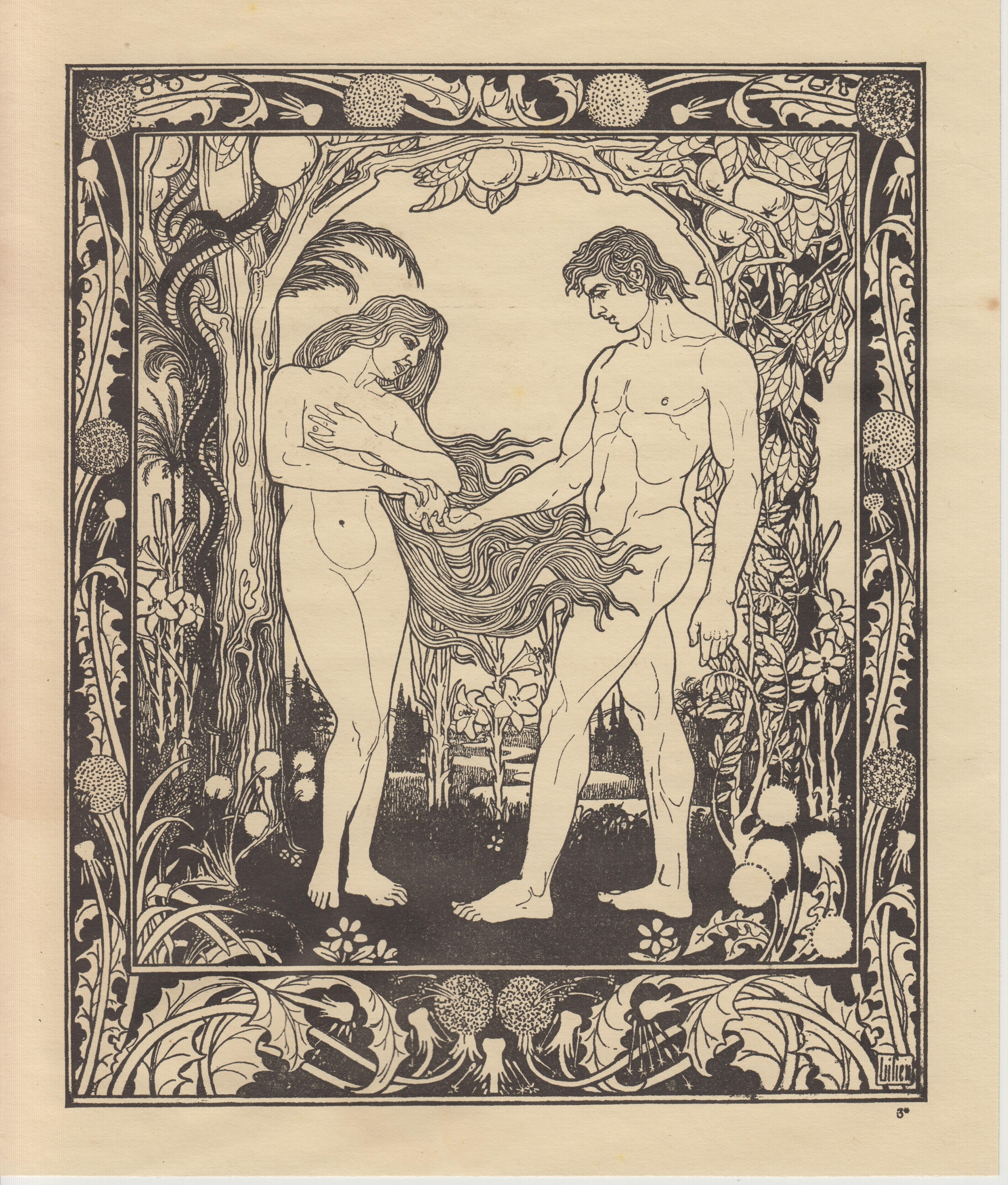
"Adam and Eve" by Ephraim Moshe Lilien, 1923

In Judaism, Christianity, and some other Abrahamic religions, the commandment to "be fruitful and multiply" (referred to as the "creation mandate" in some Christian traditions) is the divine injunction which forms part of Genesis 1:28, in which God, after having created the world and all in it, ascribes to humankind the tasks of reproducing and filling the earth. After the flood, God repeats the same instruction to Noah and his sons: "Be fruitful and multiply and fill the earth".

The text finds an immediate interpretation in the opening chapter of the book of Exodus as the description of the Israelites in Biblical Egypt are alluded to as, "fruitful, increased greatly, multiplied, and extremely strong, so that the land was filled with them".

== Biblical account ==
=== Texts ===
The commandment appears in Genesis 1:28 (within the creation narrative) and Genesis 9:1, 7 (after the flood). R. N. Whybray sees the repetition of the mandate as heralding "new era and ... renewed humanity" when God restores creation after its destruction.

The text of Genesis 1:28 states:

| Version | Text |
|---|---|
| Original Hebrew | וַיְבָרֶךְ אֹתָם אֱלֹהִים וַיֹּאמֶר לָהֶם אֱלֹהִים פְּרוּ וּרְבוּ וּמִלְאוּ אֶת הָאָרֶץ וְכִבְשֻׁהָ וּרְדוּ בִּדְגַת הַיָּם וּבְעוֹף הַשָּׁמַיִם וּבְכָל חַיָּה הָרֹמֶשֶׂת עַל הָאָרֶץ; Wayəḇāreḵ ’ōṯām ’ĕlōhîm, wayyō’mer lāhem ’ĕlōhîm, "Pərû, ûrəḇû, ûmilə’û ’eṯ-hā’āreṣ, wəḵiḇəšuhā; ûrəḏû biḏəg̱aṯ hayyām, ûḇə‘ôp̱ haššāmayim, ûḇəḵāl-ḥayyāh hārōmeśeṯ ‘al-hā’āreṣ." |
| Septuagint | καὶ εὐλόγησεν αὐτοὺς ὁ Θεός, λέγων· αὐξάνεσθε καὶ πληθύνεσθε καὶ πληρώσατε τὴν γῆν καὶ κατακυριεύσατε αὐτῆς καὶ ἄρχετε τῶν ἰχθύων τῆς θαλάσσης καὶ τῶν πετεινῶν τοῦ οὐρανοῦ καὶ πάντων τῶν κτηνῶν καὶ πάσης τῆς γῆς καὶ πάντων τῶν ἑρπετῶν τῶν ἑρπόντων ἐπὶ τῆς γῆς. Kaí evlógisen aftoús o Theós, légon: afxánesthe kaí plithýnesthe kaí plirósate tín gín kaí katakyriéfsate aftís kaí árchete tón ichthýon tís thalássis kaí tón peteinón toú ouranoú kaí pánton tón ktinón kaí pásis tís gís kaí pánton tón erpetón tón erpónton epí tís gís. |
| Vulgate | Benedixitque illis Deus et ait illis Deus: “Crescite et multiplicamini et replete terram et subicite eam et dominamini piscibus maris et volatilibus caeli et universis animantibus, quae moventur super terram”. |
| JPS Tanakh | God blessed them and God said to them, “Be fertile and increase, fill the earth and master it; and rule the fish of the sea, the birds of the sky, and all the living things that creep on earth.” |
| Everett Fox | God blessed them, and God said to them: Bear fruit and be many and fill the earth and subdue it! Have dominion over the fish of the sea, the birds of the heavens, and all living things that crawl about on the earth! |
| King James Bible | And God blessed them, and God said unto them, Be fruitful, and multiply, and replenish the earth, and subdue it: and have dominion over the fish of the sea, and over the fowl of the air, and over every living thing that moveth upon the earth. |
| New International Version | God blessed them and said to them, "Be fruitful and increase in number; fill the earth and subdue it. Rule over the fish in the sea and the birds in the sky and over every living creature that moves on the ground." |
| New Living Translation | Then God blessed them and said, "Be fruitful and multiply. Fill the earth and govern it. Reign over the fish in the sea, the birds in the sky, and all the animals that scurry along the ground." |

=== Interpretation ===
In Orthodox Judaism, the mandate to "be fruitful and multiply" is interpreted as requiring every couple to have at least a son and a daughter. Other Jewish groups (such as Reform Judaism) and individual Jews have interpreted this mandate differently. For example, Richard Elliott Friedman considers that the mandate "be fruitful and multiply and fill the Earth" has "now been fulfilled". The mandate is elaborated upon in numerous parts of the Talmud, for example in Kidushin.

Despite "be fruitful and multiply" being the most important mitzvah, contraception is permitted in some sects of Judaism in appropriate circumstances such as difficult family situations. In instances like these, rabbis may allow women to start contraceptive methods.

For some Christians, humans should actively work to fulfill the mandate.

== Qur'an ==
The text of surat Al-Baqarah 2:187 in the Qur'an enjoins the listeners (presumably male) to be intimate with their wives and do "that which God has decreed for them", a statement defined by commentators to refer to having children:

| Version | Text |
|---|---|
| Original Arabic | أُحِلَّ لَكُمْ لَيْلَةَ ٱلصِّيَامِ ٱلرَّفَثُ إِلَىٰ نِسَآئِكُمْ ۚ هُنَّ لِبَاسٌۭ لَّكُمْ وَأَنتُمْ لِبَاسٌۭ لَّهُنَّ ۗ عَلِمَ ٱللَّهُ أَنَّكُمْ كُنتُمْ تَخْتَانُونَ أَنفُسَكُمْ فَتَابَ عَلَيْكُمْ وَعَفَا عَنكُمْ ۖ فَٱلْـَٔـٰنَ بَـٰشِرُوهُنَّ وَٱبْتَغُوا۟ مَا كَتَبَ ٱللَّهُ لَكُمْ ۚ وَكُلُوا۟ وَٱشْرَبُوا۟ حَتَّىٰ يَتَبَيَّنَ لَكُمُ ٱلْخَيْطُ ٱلْأَبْيَضُ مِنَ ٱلْخَيْطِ ٱلْأَسْوَدِ مِنَ ٱلْفَجْرِ ۖ ثُمَّ أَتِمُّوا۟ ٱلصِّيَامَ إِلَى ٱلَّيْلِ ۚ وَلَا تُبَـٰشِرُوهُنَّ وَأَنتُمْ عَـٰكِفُونَ فِى ٱلْمَسَـٰجِدِ ۗ تِلْكَ حُدُودُ ٱللَّهِ فَلَا تَقْرَبُوهَا ۗ كَذَٰلِكَ يُبَيِّنُ ٱللَّهُ ءَايَـٰتِهِۦ لِلنَّاسِ لَعَلَّهُمْ يَتَّقُونَ ١٨٧ Ohilla lakum laylata assiyamiarrafathu ila nisa-ikum hunna libasunlakum waantum libasun lahunna AAalima Allahuannakum kuntum takhtanoona anfusakum fatabaAAalaykum waAAafa AAankum fal-ana bashiroohunnawabtaghoo ma kataba Allahu lakum wakuloo washraboohatta yatabayyana lakumu alkhaytu al-abyadumina alkhayti al-aswadi mina alfajri thumma atimmoo assiyamaila allayli wala tubashiroohunna waantum AAakifoonafee almasajidi tilka hudoodu Allahi falataqrabooha kathalika yubayyinu Allahu ayatihilinnasi laAAallahum yattaqoon |
| Sahih International | It has been made permissible for you the night preceding fasting to go to your wives [for sexual relations]. They are clothing for you and you are clothing for them. Allah knows that you used to deceive yourselves, so He accepted your repentance and forgave you. So now, have relations with them and seek that which Allah has decreed for you. And eat and drink until the white thread of dawn becomes distinct to you from the black thread [of night]. Then complete the fast until the sunset. And do not have relations with them as long as you are staying for worship in the mosques. These are the limits [set by] Allah, so do not approach them. Thus does Allah make clear His ordinances to the people that they may become righteous. |
| Muhsin Khan | It is made lawful for you to have sexual relations with your wives on the night of As-Saum (the fasts). They are Libas [i.e. body cover, or screen, or Sakan, (i.e. you enjoy the pleasure of living with her - as in Verse 7:189) Tafsir At-Tabari], for you and you are the same for them. Allah knows that you used to deceive yourselves, so He turned to you (accepted your repentance) and forgave you. So now have sexual relations with them and seek that which Allah has ordained for you (offspring), and eat and drink until the white thread (light) of dawn appears to you distinct from the black thread (darkness of night), then complete your Saum (fast) till the nightfall. And do not have sexual relations with them (your wives) while you are in I'tikaf (i.e. confining oneself in a mosque for prayers and invocations leaving the worldly activities) in the mosques. These are the limits (set) by Allah, so approach them not. Thus does Allah make clear His Ayat [revelations, laws, etc.] to mankind that they may become Al-Muttaqun (the pious - see V.2:2). |

== In popular culture ==
Below is a list of some instances where the injunction has been used in modern media, music, and literature:

- A Latin translation of the injunction was used as the official motto of the State of Maryland until 1874.
- In 1999, the Israeli musical comedy Kuni-Leml released a cast album including a song named after the injunction as track fifteen.
- In 2005, a documentary by Israeli director Shosh Shlam was produced and named after the injunction.
- On January 29, 2007, an episode of the American adult television show Moral Orel was named after the injunction.
- On September 26, 2009, a film based on the American horror author Stephen King's story Children of the Corn released, which depicts a scene referencing the injunction.
- On October 7, 2011, American gospel singer VaShawn Mitchell released his album "Triumphant" with the song on track eight titled "Be Fruitful," referencing the injunction.
- On September 10, 2013, an episode of the American reality television show Doomsday Castle was named after the injunction.
- On November 5, 2023, the final theme for the Japanese anime Attack on Titan titled "To You 2,000... or... 20,000 Years From Now..." included a line referencing the injunction in verse five.

== See also ==
- Natalism
