= Nahum Rabinovitch =

Israeli rabbi

Rabbi Dr. Nachum Eliezer Rabinovitch נַחוּם אֱלִיעֶזֶר רָבִּינוֹבִיץּ׳
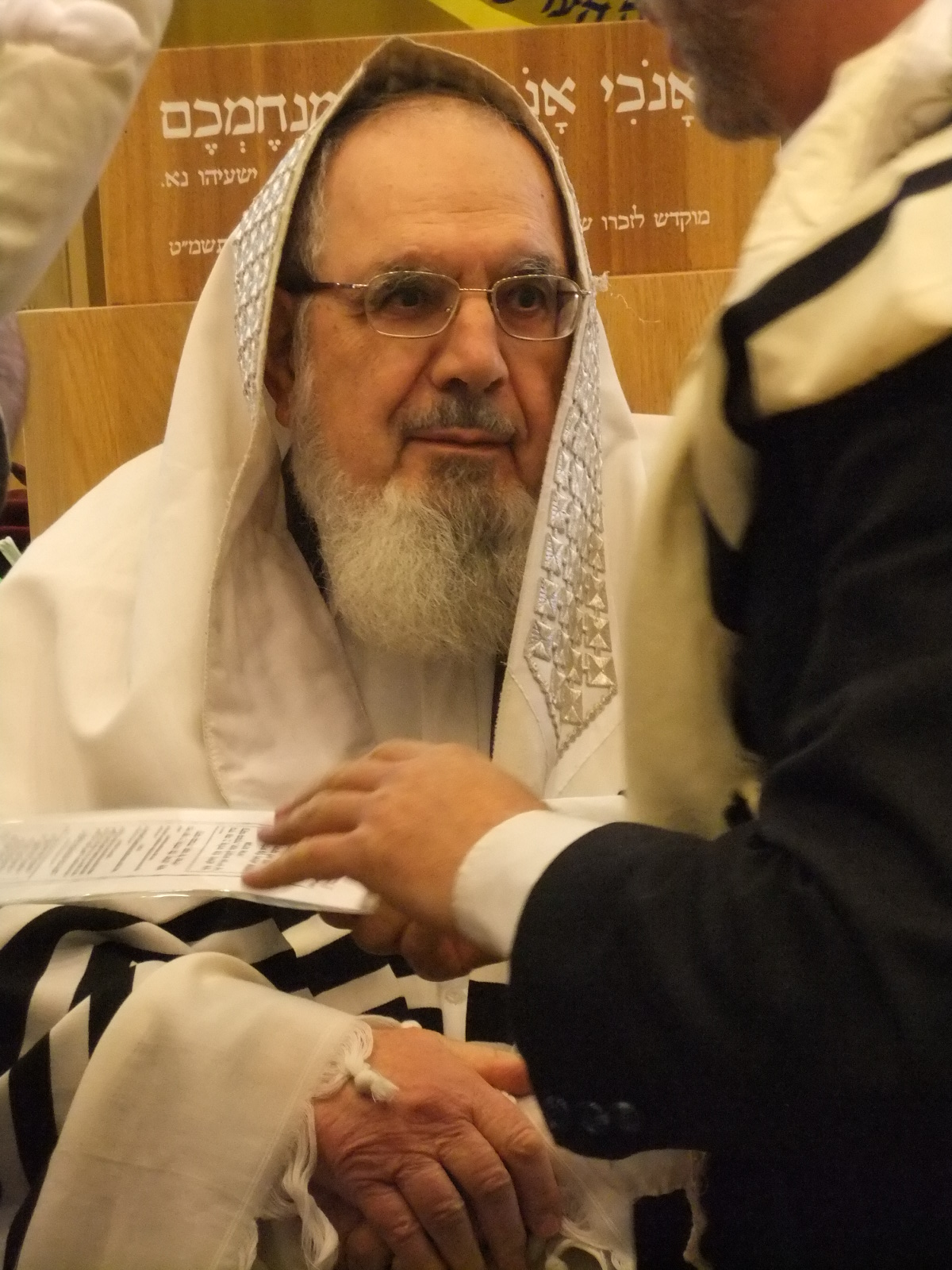

Personal life
- Born: Norman Louis Rabinovitch; 30 April 1928 Montreal, Quebec, Canada
- Died: 6 May 2020 (aged 92) Israel
- Buried: Har HaMenuchot
- Spouse: Ruth (Rachel Malka) Shuchatowitz (m. 1951; died 2012)
- Children: 6, including Dina Rabinovitch
- Education: Johns Hopkins University (B.S.); University of Toronto (Ph.D.)

Religious life
- Religion: Judaism
- Denomination: Religious Zionism

Jewish leader
- Main work: Melumdei Milḥamah (1993); Yad Peshutah (1977–2016)

Nachum Eliezer Rabinovitch (Hebrew: נַחוּם אֱלִיעֶזֶר רָבִּינוֹבִיץּ׳; 30 April 1928 – 6 May 2020), born Norman Louis Rabinovitch, was a Canadian-Israeli Religious Zionist rabbi and posek. He headed the London School of Jewish Studies from 1971 to 1982, and the hesder yeshiva Birkat Moshe in Ma'ale Adumim from 1982 until his death.

== Early life and education ==
Nahum Rabinovitch was born in Montreal, Quebec to Sarah (née Weiner) and Sam Rabinovitch. After completing an eight-year course of studies under Rabbi Pinchas Hirschsprung, Rabinovitch received semicha from Montreal's Yeshivas Merkaz HaTorah in the city's first rabbinical ordination ceremony.

After obtaining an honours degree in commerce from Sir George Williams College, he left for Baltimore to pursue a Master of Science degree in mathematics at Johns Hopkins University. While there, he studied at Yeshivas Ner Yisroel, where he received a second ordination from Rabbi Yaakov Yitzchok Ruderman.

== Career ==
Between 1955 and 1963, Rabinovitch served as spiritual leader of the Brith Sholom Beth Israel Congregation in Charleston, South Carolina. In this role, he helped establish the city's first Jewish day school, of which he served as principal. He also held appointments as lecturer in mathematics at the College of Charleston and chaplain to the Sixth Naval District Headquarters.

In 1963, he was called to serve as a community rabbi in Toronto, and assumed the pulpit of the Clanton Park Synagogue in Downsview. He completed a Ph.D. in the philosophy and history of mathematics at the University of Toronto in 1971 under the supervision of Kenneth O. May. His doctoral thesis, Probability and Statistical Inference in Ancient and Medieval Jewish Literature, was published as a monograph in 1973.

Rabinovitch was appointed principal of Jews' College in early 1970, and settled in London that spring. Notable among his students at the college was Chief Rabbi Lord Jonathan Sacks, who has cited Rabinovitch as his primary role model. Ten years later, he accepted an offer to become rosh yeshiva of Yeshivat Birkat Moshe, a hesder institution in Ma'ale Adumim.

In 2015, together with a group of prominent Israeli rabbis, Rabinovitch established Giyur Kehalacha, an independent beit din offering conversions outside of the Chief Rabbinate.

== Philosophical and political views ==
Rabinovitch published Halakhic rulings on various subjects, including organ donation, surrogacy, birth control, army service, Shabbat, and kashrut. His philosophical approach, influenced by Maimonidean rationalism, emphasized the connection between philosophy and Halakha, between Torah and scientific studies, and between theoretical learning and practical applications.

Rabinovitch was an authority on the writings of Maimonides, about which he published numerous books and essays. He is perhaps best known for his fourteen-volume Yad Peshuta (lit. "Outstretched Hand"), an in-depth commentary on Maimonides' Mishneh Torah. He also authored Melumdei Milḥamah (lit. "Learned in War"), a collection of responsa dealing with Halakhic issues facing religious members of the Israel Defense Forces.

Rabinovitch was a religious Zionist, a supporter of the settlement movement, and a vocal opponent of the Oslo Accords and the Disengagement. He was, however, often more liberal in social and religious matters than many in the religious Zionist movement. In an interview, Rabinovitch said that he backed religious studies for women, and did not see a problem in Halakhic decisions taken by women. Nonetheless, he signed a letter in 2019 agreeing with the Chief Rabbinate's opposition to religious Jewish women serving in the IDF. He also ruled that it is incumbent on Israeli combat medics and doctors to treat and save the lives of Palestinian combatants, even if wounded in the course of attacking Israelis. Rabinovitch characterized Christianity and Islam positively, as movements that spread monotheism, morality, and messianic hope. In addition, Rabinovitch differed from many other religious Zionist leaders in that he did not view the State of Israel as a harbinger of the Messiah and argued for greater separation between religion and state in Israel. Often, his iconoclastic positions were deeply influenced not only by Jewish tradition, but by the core ideas of political liberalism as well.

In 1995, Rabinovitch was among a group of rabbis accused of indirectly influencing Yigal Amir to assassinate Prime Minister Yitzhak Rabin, having branded Rabin a moser and likened his government to Nazis. The previous summer, he had also issued a ruling that Jewish soldiers should disobey any government orders to vacate West Bank army bases.

== Personal life ==
Rabinovitch had six children, including British journalist Dina Rabinovitch (born in 1963), who died in 2007 of breast cancer.

== Selected works ==
=== Books ===
- Hadar Itamar [הדר איתמר] (in Hebrew). Jerusalem: Daʻat Torah. 1971.
- Probability and Statistical Inference in Ancient and Medieval Jewish Literature. Toronto: University of Toronto Press. 1973.
- Darkah shel Torah [דרכה של תורה] (in Hebrew). Ma'ale Adumim: Maaliyot Press. 1998.
- Melumdei Milḥama [מלומדי מלחמה] (in Hebrew). Ma'ale Adumim: Maaliyot Press. 2004.
- Siach Nachum [שיח נחום] (in Hebrew). Ma'ale Adumim: Maaliyot Press. 2008.
- Iyunim be-Mishnato shel ha-Rambam [עיונים במשנתו של הרמב״ם] (in Hebrew). Ma'ale Adumim: Maaliyot Press. 2010.
- Mesilot Bilvavam [מסילות בלבבם] (in Hebrew). Ma'ale Adumim: Maaliyot Press. 2015.
- Yad Peshuta [יד פשוטה] (in Hebrew). Vol. 1–14. Ma'ale Adumim: Maaliyot Press. 1977–2016.

=== Articles ===
- Rabinovitch, Nachum L. (Winter 1965). "Chametz and Matzah: A Halakhic Perspective". Tradition. 7 (4): 77–88. JSTOR 23256045.
- Rabinovitch, Nachum L. (Fall 1966). "A Halakhic View of the Non-Jew". Tradition. 8 (3): 27–39. JSTOR 23256082.
- Rabinovitch, Nachum L. (Spring 1968). "What Is the Halakhah for Organ Transplants?". Tradition. 9 (4): 20–27. JSTOR 44818165.
- Rabinovitch, Nachum L. (August 1969). "Studies in the History of Probability and Statistics. XXII: Probability in the Talmud". Biometrika. 56 (2): 437–441. doi:10.2307/2334437. JSTOR 2334437.
- Rabinovitch, Nachum L. (Summer 1970). "Rabbi Hasdai Crescas (1340–1410) on Numerical Infinities". Isis. 61 (2): 224–230. doi:10.1086/350621. JSTOR 229976. S2CID 144368575.
- Rabinovitch, Nachum L. (1970). "Rabbi Levi ben Gershom and the Origins of Mathematical Induction". Archive for History of Exact Sciences. 6 (3): 237–248. doi:10.1007/BF00327237. JSTOR 41133303. S2CID 119948133.
- "A Fifteenth-Century Law of Large Numbers". Isis. 65 (2): 229–238. June 1974. doi:10.1086/351259. S2CID 143806284.
- Rabinovitch, Nachum L. (Fall 1974). "The Religious Significance of Israel". Tradition. 14 (4): 20–28. JSTOR 23258511.
- Rabinovitch, Nachum L. (December 1974). "Early Antecedents of Error Theory". Archive for History of Exact Sciences. 13 (4): 348–358. doi:10.1007/BF00327300. S2CID 119599431.
- "Torah and Science: Conflict or Complement?". Challenge: Torah Views on Science and Its Problems. Jerusalem: Feldheim Publishers. 1976. pp. 44–53. ISBN 9781583304242.
- "Torah and the Spirit of Free Enquiry". Challenge: Torah Views on Science and Its Problems. Jerusalem: Feldheim Publishers. 1976. pp. 53–67. ISBN 9781583304242.
- Rabinovitch, Nachum L. (1977). "The One and the Many: Early Stochastic Reasoning in Philosophy". Annals of Science. 34 (4): 331–344. doi:10.1080/00033797700200261.
- "Halachah and Technology". Proceedings of the Association of Orthodox Jewish Scientists. 2: 129–149. 1969.
- "All Jews Are Responsible for One Another". Jewish Tradition and the Nontraditional Jew. Northvale, N.J.: Aronson Press. 1992. pp. 177–204.

== Bibliography ==
- Brill, Alan (7 June 2020). "Rabbi Nahum Rabinovitch on Philosophy of Halakhah". The Book of Doctrines and Opinions: Notes on Jewish Theology and Spirituality. Retrieved 11 August 2020.
- Nadler, Allan (Summer 2018). "Maimonides in Ma'ale Adumim". Jewish Review of Books.
- Schwartz, Rami (2021). "The Political Theology of Rabbi Nachum Eliezer Rabinovitch". The Torah u-Madda Journal. 18, 1–32.
- Schwartz, Rami (2024). "BOOK REVIEW: Nachum L. Rabinovitch, Pathways to Their Hearts: Torah Perspectives on the Individual". Tradition. 56:1, 162-184.
