= William Romanowski =

William Romanowski may refer to:

- Bill Romanowski (born 1966), American football player
- William D. Romanowski (born 1954), American media critic
