= Flag of Montgomery County, Maryland =

American county flag

Montgomery County
- The current flag of Maryland's Montgomery County.
- Use: Other
- Proportion: 2:3
- Adopted: October 5, 1976
- Design: A rectangle, three parts wide and two parts tall, quartered by a crenellated line, separating the top two quarters from the two bottom quarters, and a straight vertical line, separating the left two quarters from the two right quarters, with the upper left and lower right quarters consisting of a gold fleur-de-lis on a blue background, with the upper right and lower left quarters consisting of a gold ring with a blue gem on a red background, with a crenellated line formed of 11 squares, 1/11 of flag length, with center block split in middle with left side red and right side blue, with rings and fleur-de-lises to be three times as high as a block in the crenellated line with width proportional, with rings and fleur-de-lises centered horizontally on their quarters and spaced vertically so that upper and lower edge of rings and fleur-de-lises at equal distance from the horizontal outside edge of quarter and nearest part of crenellated line.
- Designed by: College of Arms
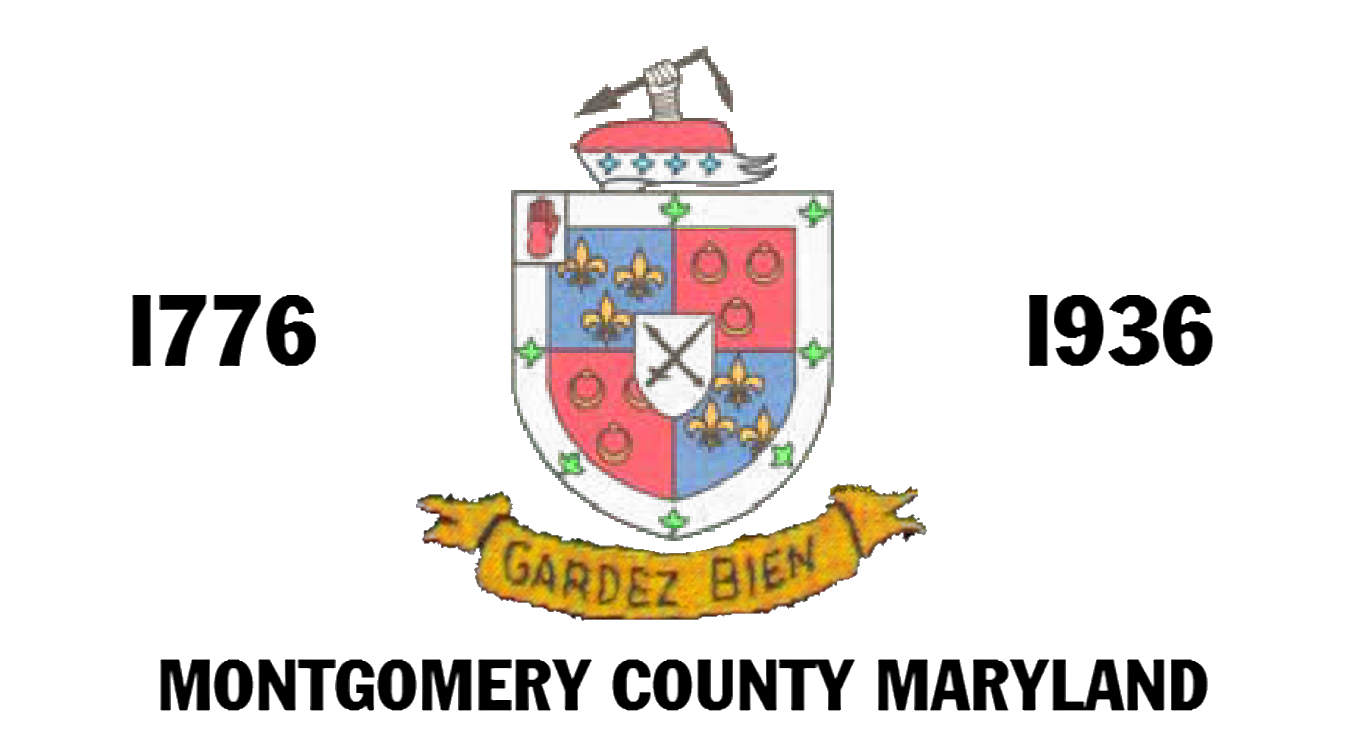
- The former flag of Montgomery County, Maryland, used from May 3, 1944 to October 5, 1976.
- Use: Other
- Adopted: May 3, 1944 – October 5, 1976
- Designed by: Lilly Catherine Stone

The current flag of Montgomery County, Maryland was adopted on October 5, 1976. It was designed by the British College of Arms. It is commonly flown outside of the Montgomery County's governmental facilities, such as fire stations.

The flag is based on the coat of arms of the Montgomery family, a scion of which, Richard Montgomery, gave the county its name. It is the county's second flag, replacing the first one, which had been in use from May 3, 1944, until its replacement in 1976.

== History ==
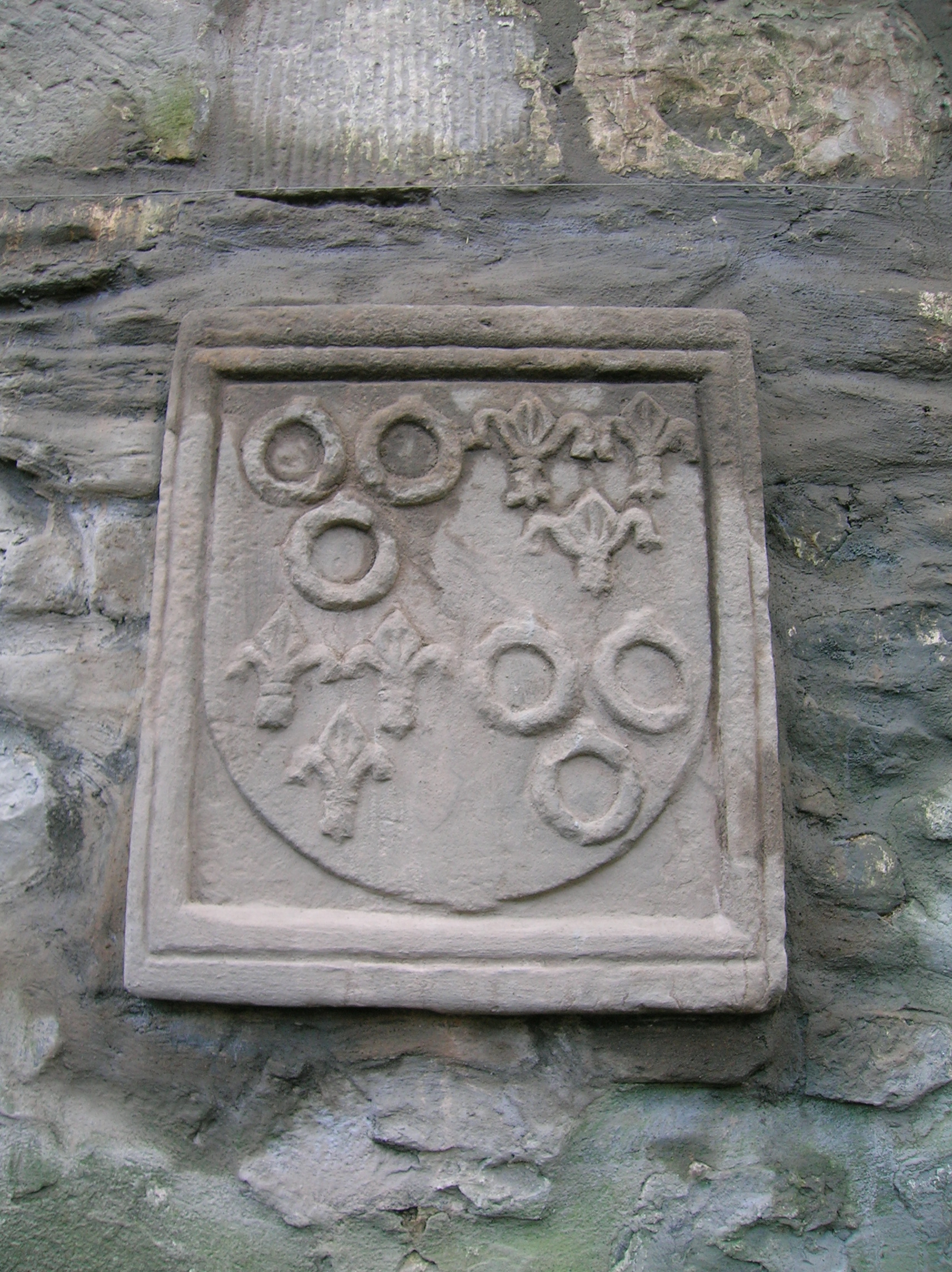
The Montgomery coat of arms after the marriage of John and Elizabeth, as carved at Eglinton Castle

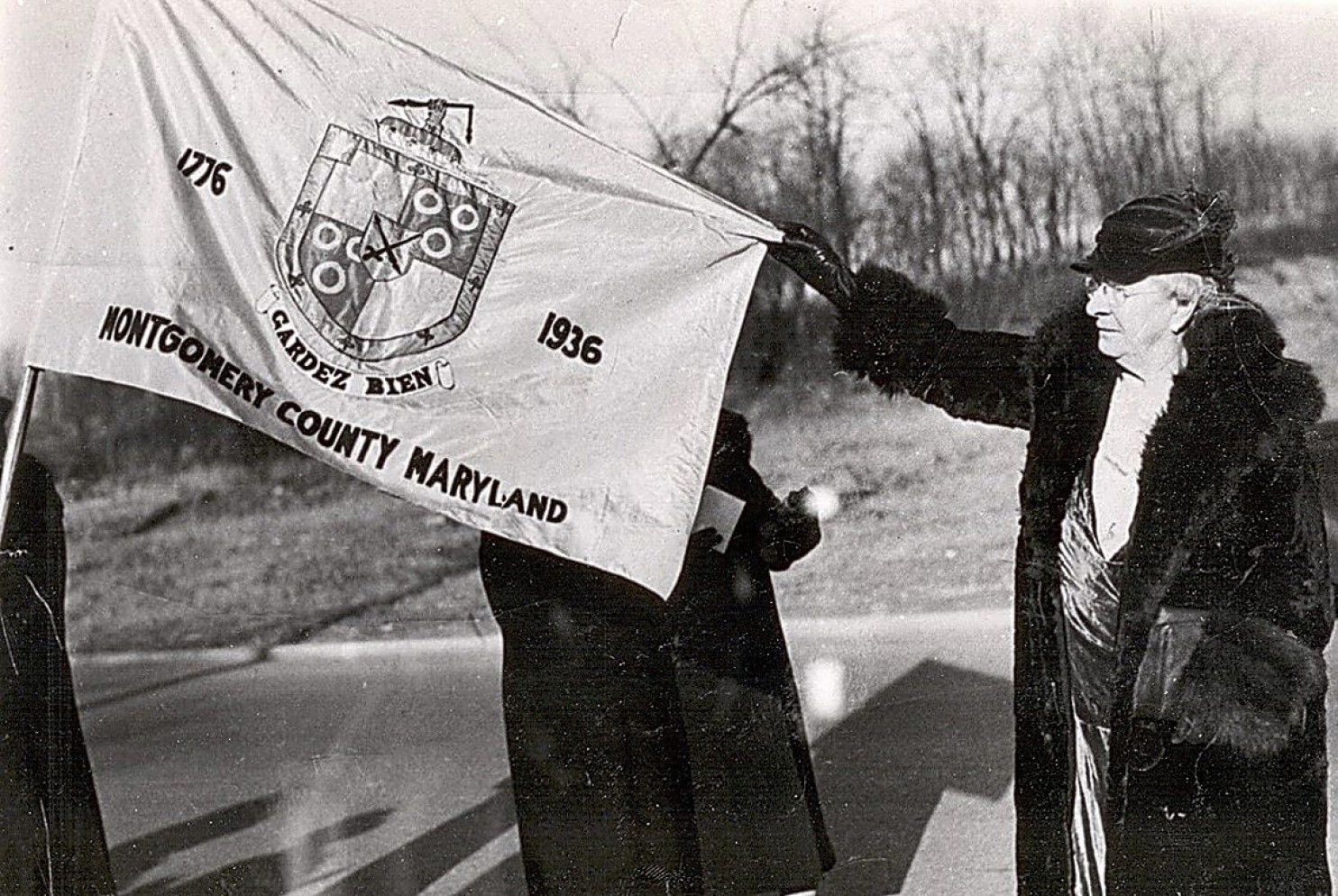
The first Montgomery County flag with its designer Lilly Catherine Stone in 1944.

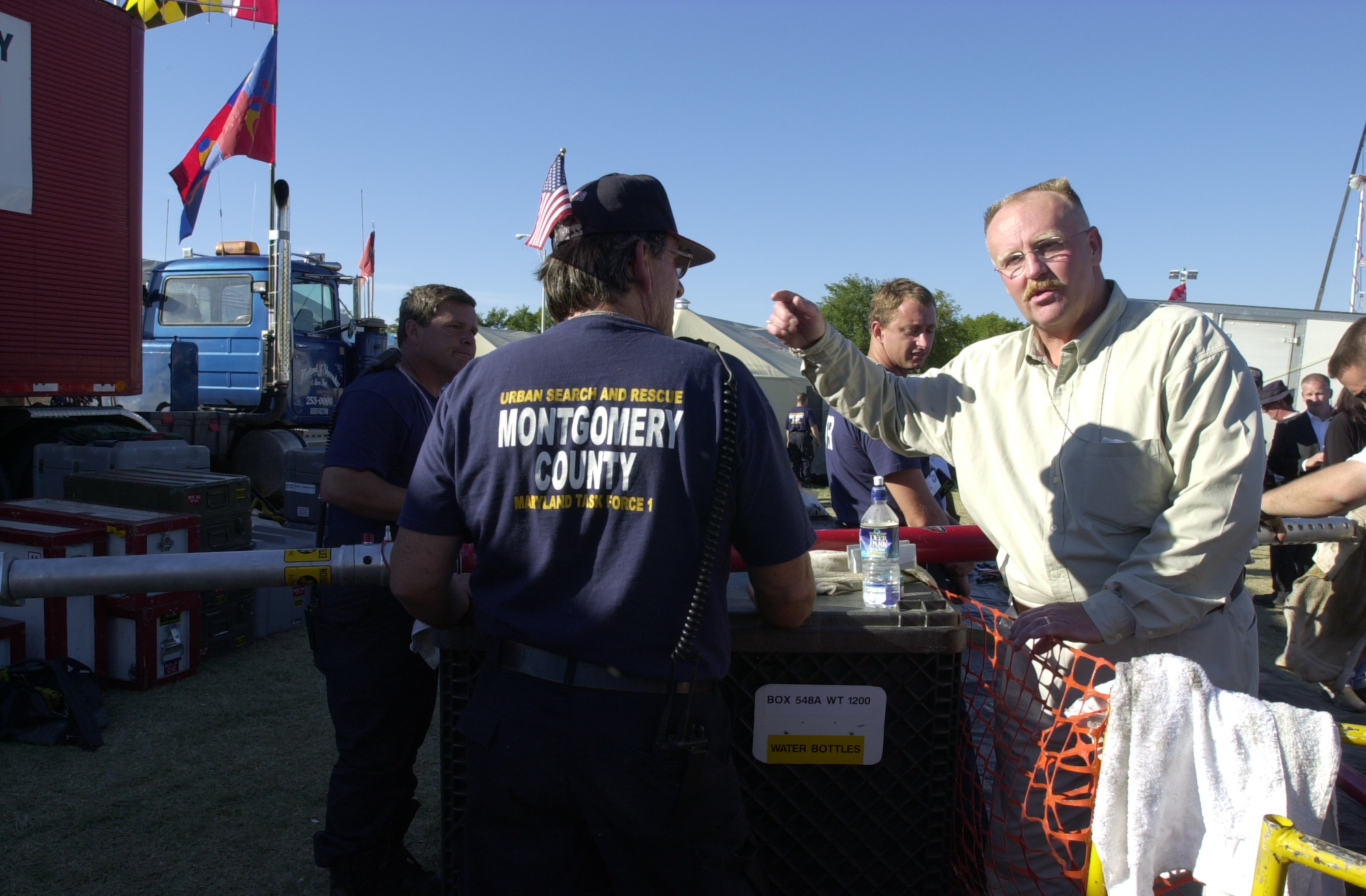
The Montgomery County flag being flown by firemen at the Pentagon after the September 11 attacks in 2001.

=== Former flag: 1944–1976 ===
A former flag was used by Montgomery County from May 3, 1944, until October 1976. It was designed by Lilly Catherine Stone and featured the former Montgomery County coat of arms along on a white background, inscribed with the county's name and the date it was founded.

=== Current flag: 1976–present ===
The current flag is a banner of the arms granted to the county by England's College of Heralds. At the request of the Montgomery County Executive, it was officially adopted by the Montgomery County Council as the county flag by Bill 38-76 on October 5, 1976. Bill 38-76 has since been designated as Section 1-402 of the Montgomery County Code.

The fleur-de-lis in two quarters of the flag comes from the arms of the Montgomery family. The oldest known depiction of the Montgomery fleur-de-lis appears on the seal of John de Mundegumri, who lived in the late 12th century. In 1368, the family's chief Sir John Montgomery married Elizabeth, the heiress of the Eglinton family, whose arms incorporated three rings. Their descendants combined the Montgomery fleurs-de-lis with the Eglinton rings in one quartered shield.

The indented line which separates the upper and lower quarters of the flag represent the borders of local government. The shades of red and blue are said to be identical to those on the national flag of the United States, whereas the shade of gold is identical to that found on the Maryland state flag, denoted as PMS 124 on the Pantone Matching System scale.

== Design ==
According to the Montgomery County government in 1999, the flag was described as:

The following specifications are used to produce the County flag: Height to length, 2 to 3. The flag will be quartered by a crenellated line, separating the top two quarters from the two bottom quarters, and a straight vertical line, separating the left two quarters from the two right quarters. The upper left and lower right quarters shall consist of a gold fleur-de-lis on a blue background. The upper right and lower left quarters shall consist of a gold ring with a blue gem on a red background. Crenellated line formed of 11 squares, 1/11 of flag length, with center block split in middle with left side red and right side blue. Rings and fleur-de-lises to be three times as high as a block in the crenellated line with width proportional. Rings and fleur-de-lises centered horizontally on their quarters and spaced vertically so that upper and lower edge of rings and fleur-de-lises are equal distance from horizontal outside edge of quarter and nearest part of crenellated line.

— Montgomery County government, 1999.

=== Colors ===
The official description of the flag in the county code states that the shade of red and blue used on the flag are to be identical to that found on the county's coat of arms, which themselves are the same shades of red and blue used in the US flag, and that the shade of gold is identical to that found on the flag of the State of Maryland.

Color scheme	Old Glory Blue	Black	Old Glory Red	Maryland Gold
CMYK	100-91-30-23	0-0-0-100	21-99-83-11	0-27-100-8
HEX	#002868	#000000	#B22234	#EAAB00
RGB	0-38-100	0-0-0	167-19-62	234-171-0
Pantone	281		193	124

== See also ==
- Flag of Maryland
- Flag of Prince George's County, Maryland
- Montgomery County, Maryland
