= Flag of Prince George's County, Maryland =

Prince George's County
- Other names: Prince Georgian flag, P.G. County flag
- Use: Other
- Proportion: 3:5
- Adopted: 1963; 63 years ago
- Design: A three-foot by five-foot white field, with a four inch-thick red cross atop it. In the canton is a rendition of the Prince George's County seal from 1958.

The current flag of Prince George's County, Maryland, was adopted in 1963, replacing one that had been in use since 1696. It is a 3 parts tall by 5 parts wide white field with a red St. George's cross centered atop it, with the seal of Prince George's County defacing the canton. Though official regulation states that the flag use the former county seal that was used from 1958 to 1971, in practice most flags that are manufactured and used by the county government itself use the current county seal, which was introduced in 1971.

== History ==
The Prince George's County flag with the 1971-specification county seal, in contravention of the county code. Actually-manufactured flags that follow the county code's definition are quite rare and most ones instead use this version, with the 1971-introduced seal.

The former Prince George's County used flag from 1696 to 1963.

The flag's origins date back to 1696, when Prince George's County was first created and under English rule. The flag was used by horsemen and colonial foot soldiers and consisted of a red St. George's Cross on a white field. The red cross of St. George was a symbol of Christian martyrdom since its first use during the Crusades.

=== Modifications ===
In 1963, the Prince George's County seal, the current one at the time, designed in November 1958, was added into the flag's canton to distinguish it from other flags.

== Design ==
The flag is a three-by-five white field with a red cross centered atop it, with the county seal in the canton.

=== Specification ===
The flag as defined by the most recent iteration of the Prince George's County code is stipulated to utilize the 1958-specification county seal, which was replaced in 1971. However, most flags actually manufactured and used by the county government itself do not follow the county code's definition and rather utilize the current county seal, introduced in 1971. The differences between the 1958 seal and the 1971 one are that the former lacks an apostrophe in "George's" and uses a letter "V" instead of a letter "U". Both seals include a shield reflecting the Stuart royal arms used by Queen Anne (rather than those of the Danish Prince George) when she was Queen of England between 1703 and 1707; when Scotland and England united as the Kingdom of Great Britain in 1707, the arms Anne bore to reflect the union changed, but Prince George's County retained the older design.

== See also ==
- Flag of Maryland
- Flag of Washington, D.C.
- Flag of Montgomery County, Maryland
- Prince George's County, Maryland
