= Crescite et multiplicamini =

Latin motto

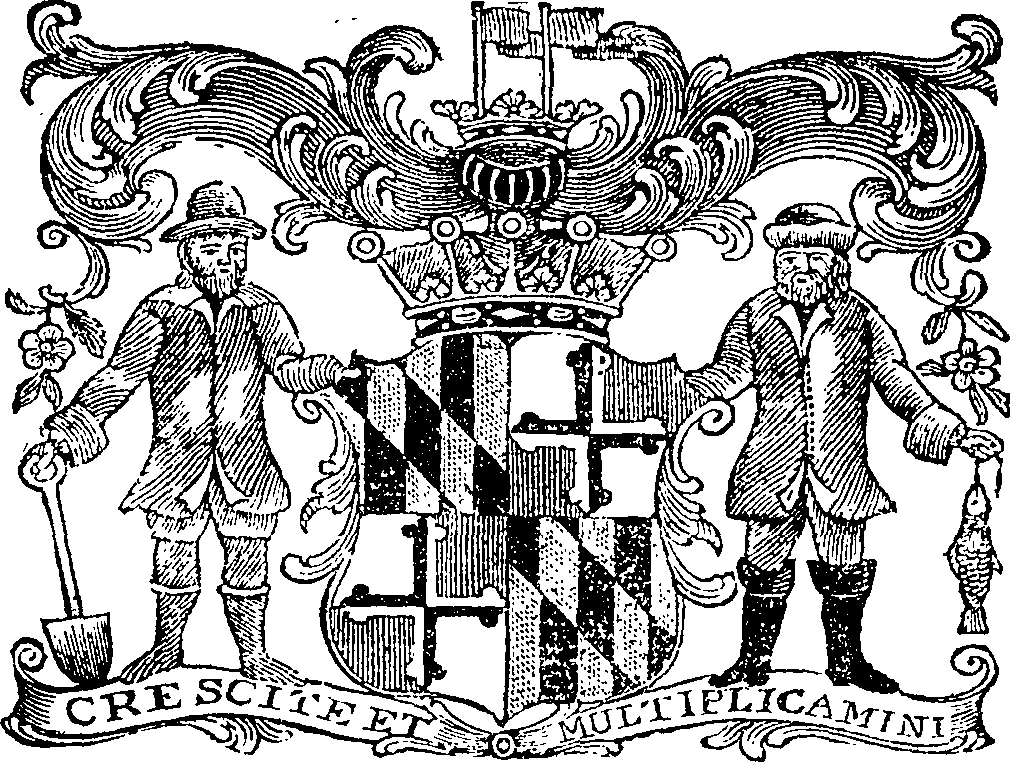
The motto on the former coat of arms of Maryland, from 1765.

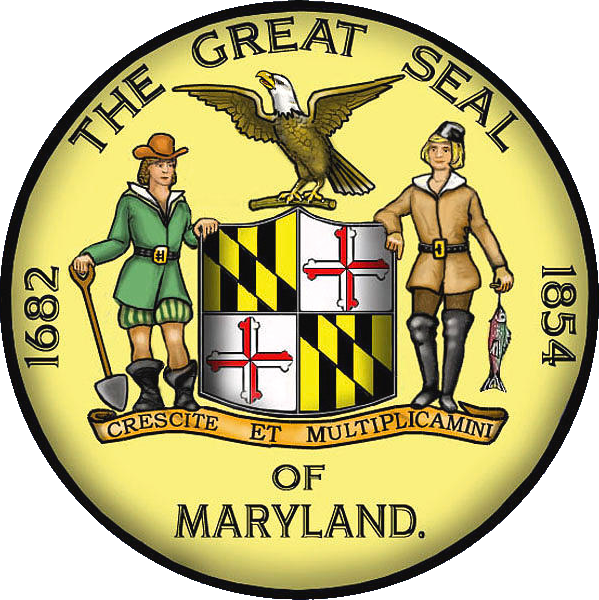
The motto on the former state seal of Maryland used from 1854 to 1874.

Crescite et multiplicamini is a Latin phrase meaning "increase and multiply" in English.

== History ==
Derived from the Bible's Genesis 1:28, it was the motto of Maryland from as early as 1765 until 1874, when it was replaced by the Italian motto, fatti maschii, parole femine.
