= Seal of Maryland =

Official government emblem of the U.S. state of Maryland

Great Seal of the State of Maryland
- The reverse of the seal of Maryland

Versions
- The obverse of the seal of Maryland
- Armiger: State of Maryland
- Adopted: 1969; 57 years ago
- Use: To represent the government of the State of Maryland in official contexts and to authenticate certain official documents

Coat of arms of Maryland
- Crest: On a ducal coronet proper, two pennons, dexter or, the other sable
- Shield: Quarterly, first and fourth, paly of six or and sable, a bend counter-changed; second and third, quarterly argent and gules, a cross bottony counter changed
- Supporters: A plowman and a fisherman proper
- Motto: Italian: Fatti maschii, parole femine
- Other elements: The arms is placed on a mantle gules, lined with ermine

The Great Seal of the State of Maryland is the seal of the U.S. state of Maryland. It is used to authenticate acts by the governor of Maryland and General Assembly of Maryland (state legislature), but it is also used more generally as an emblem to represent the government of Maryland. Although the state seal has been changed in design several times throughout history, the current model represents the reverse side of the original seal.

The seal consists of two sides, a reverse and an obverse. The obverse side has never been physically cut, meaning that only the reverse side is commonly used.

== History ==
The first seal of Maryland when it was an English colony was stolen in 1645 by Richard Ingle during a rebellion, but a similar one was sent as a replacement by Cecil Calvert, 2nd Baron Baltimore (1605-1675). This seal was used except for a period from 1692 to 1715 until a new one designed by Charles Willson Peale was adopted in 1794. That seal used republican imagery, such as a woman holding scales of justice on the obverse and on the reverse the motto "Industry the Means, Plenty the Result".

In 1817 and 1854, symbols of the eagle were used along with a version of the original reverse on the 1854 version. The original Calvert seal was brought back into use in 1874 and 1876, and has been refreshed through various modifications and corrections made to its design and meaning in 1959 and 1969.

=== Obverse side ===
The seal of Maryland is dual-sided seal, which is uncommon among U.S. states. The obverse side of the seal, which was described by statute in 1959 (Chapter 396, Acts of 1959), shows Lord Baltimore as a knight in full armor mounted on a charger with a drawn sword in hand. The caparisons of the horse on which Lord Baltimore is mounted bear his family coat of arms. The inscription on the rim of the seal shows the phrase, Cecilius Absolutus Dominus Terræ Mariæ et Avaloniæ Baro de Baltimore, which translates to "Cecil, Absolute Lord of Maryland and Avalon, Baron of Baltimore" (Chapter 79, Acts of 1969; Sections 13-101 through 13-105 of the State Government Article of the Annotated Code of Maryland).

=== Reverse side ===
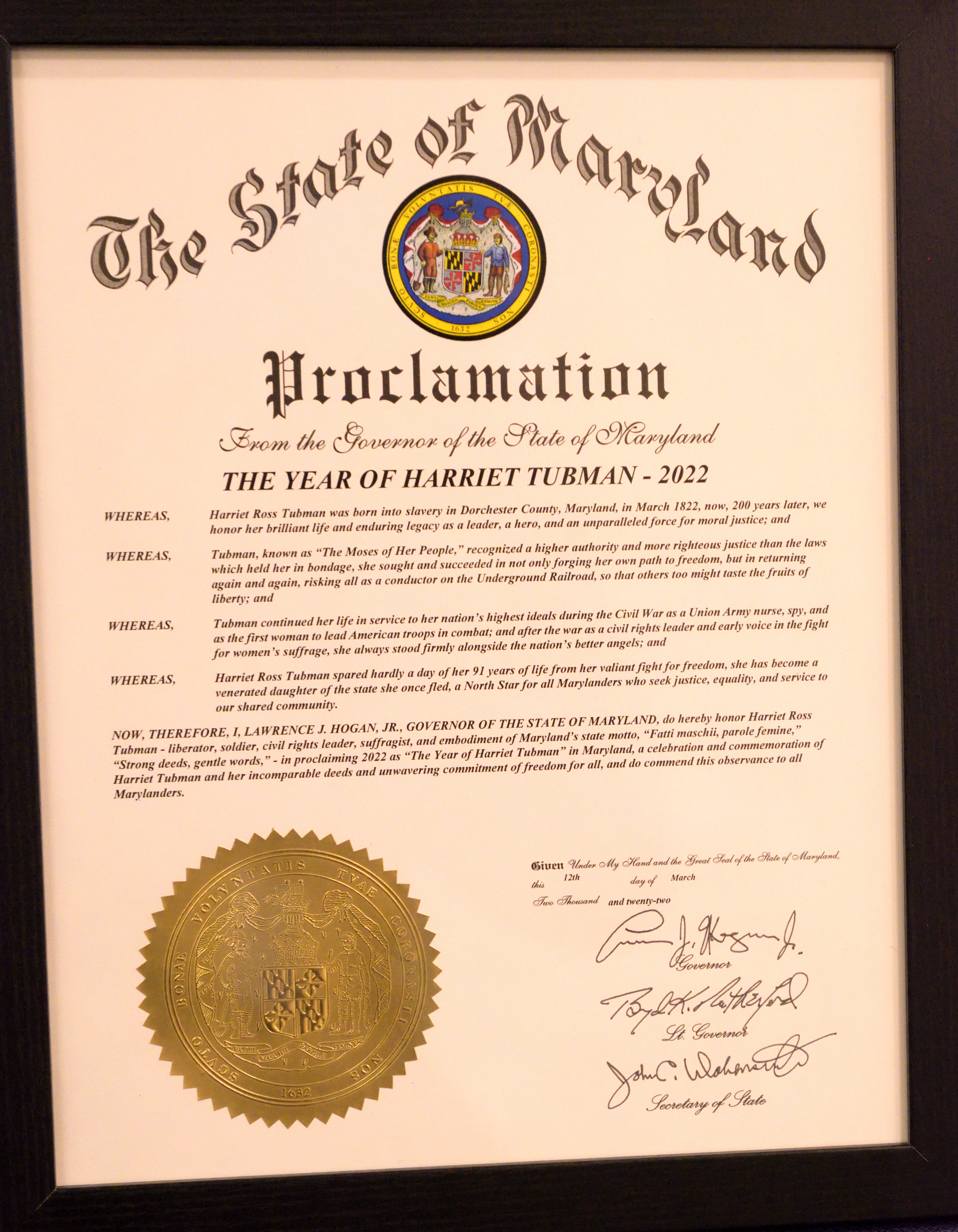
The physical impression and a pictorial representation of the reverse side seen on a proclamation

The reverse of the seal shows the Calvert arms, described as follows:

Quarterly first and fourth, a paly of six Or and Sable, a bend counterchanged; quarterly second and third, quarterly Argent and Gules a cross bottony counterchanged. Above the shield an earl's coronet surmounted by a barred helm affronté Argent.

The supporters are a plowman (dexter) and a fisherman (sinister), the former holding a spade and the latter a fish; the mantling of ermine (reverse Gules) is entire and surrounds the whole composition. The crest is a crown with two pennants, the dexter Or and the sinister Sable.

The state motto, Fatti maschii, parole femine (pronounced [ˈfatti ˈmaski paˈrɔːle ˈfeːmine]), has its origin in the archaic Italian. (Note: The modern spelling of the original version would be "Fatti maschi, parole femmine".) It literally translates as "Deeds are males, words are females", but Maryland's official translation has variously been "Deeds are manly, words are womanly" and "Manly deeds, womanly words." The current official translation, "Strong deeds, gentle words," was established during the 2017 legislative session. Maryland is the only state with a motto in Italian. The saying is the motto of the Calvert family (the Barons Baltimore), who first founded the Colony of Maryland. George Calvert, 1st Baron Baltimore (1579–1632), made it his family's motto in 1622 and it appears that the saying was well known in 17th-century England.

The Latin text encircling the seal, Scuto bonæ voluntatis tuæ coronasti nos, is from verse 12 of Psalm 5 from the Vulgate; it translates to "With favor Wilt Thou Compass Us as with a Shield" The founding date of 1632 completes the circle.

Though the reverse side has been the only part of the seal to be cut and is the part that is primarily used on official government documents, the obverse side can be found displayed around the state, especially on state government buildings, including the Maryland State House in Annapolis.

== Gallery ==
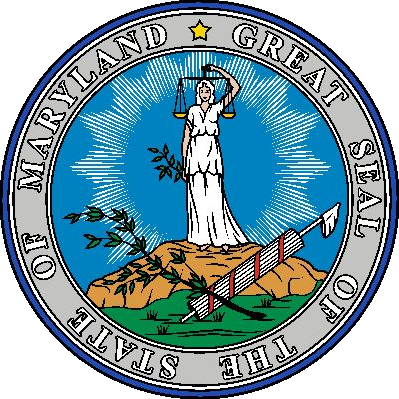
Obverse of the former state seal of Maryland used from 1794 to 1817. It was designed by Charles Willson Peale.

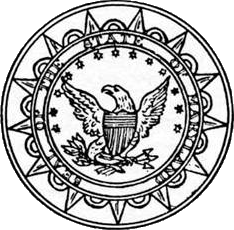
State seal of Maryland from 1817 to 1854.

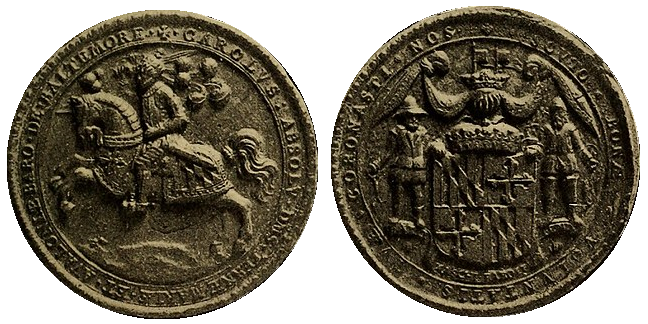
Obverse and reverse side of the seal of Charles Calvert, 3rd Baron Baltimore.

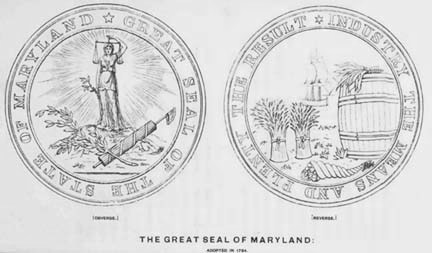
The obverse and reverse of the 1794 to 1817 state seal of Maryland, designed by Charles Willson Peale.

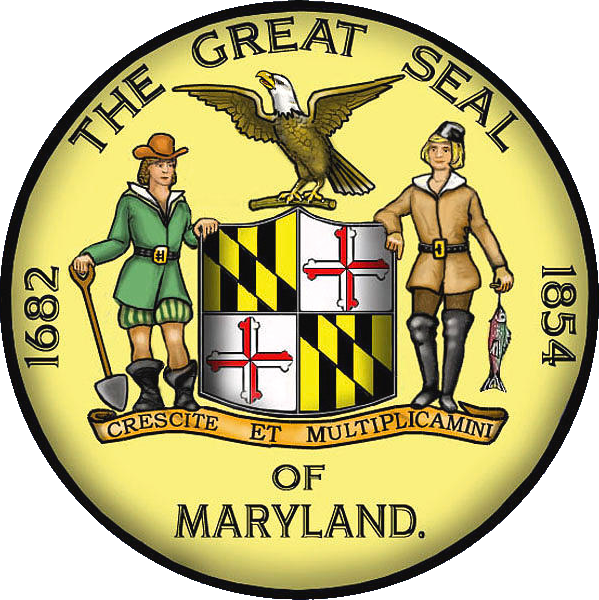
Colorized depiction of the Great Seal of Maryland from 1854 to 1874, with a North American bald eagle atop the shield and a scroll bearing the state's former motto crescite et multiplicamini.

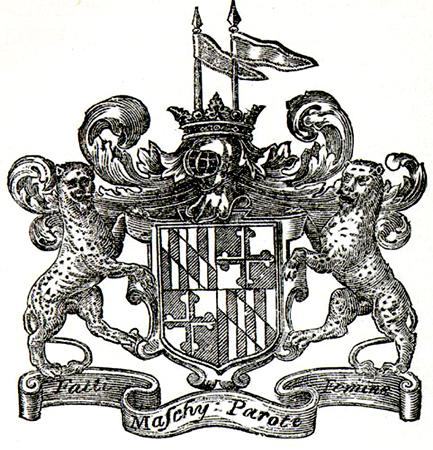
Coat of arms of the Barons Baltimore.

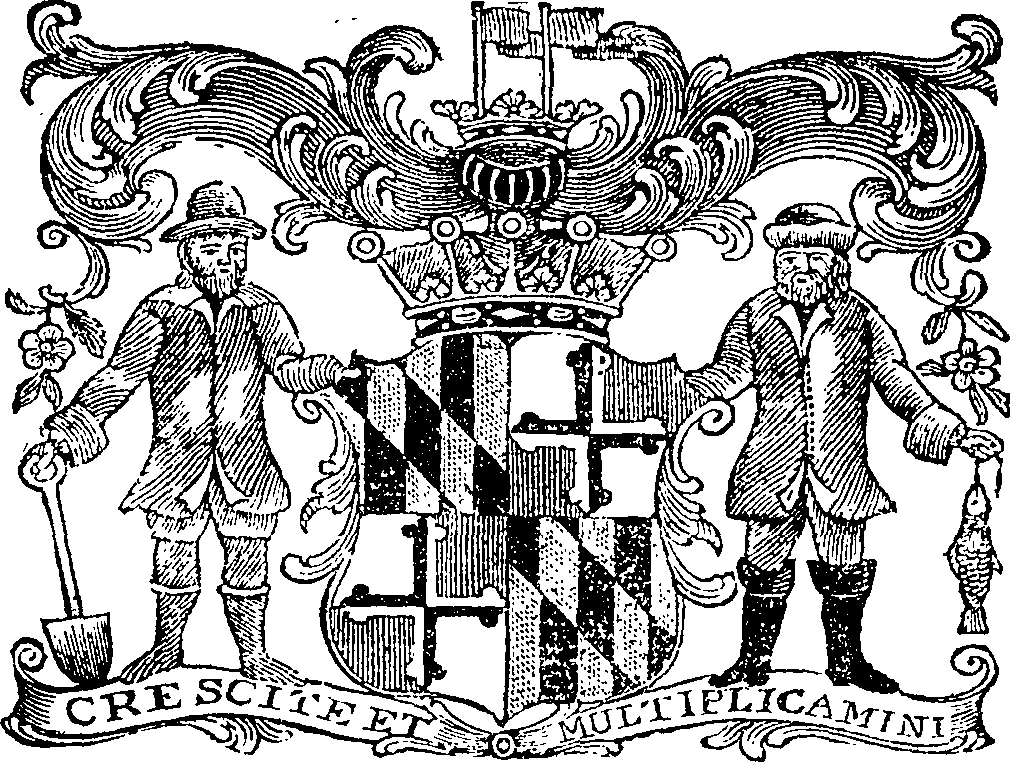
Coat of arms of Maryland from 1765.

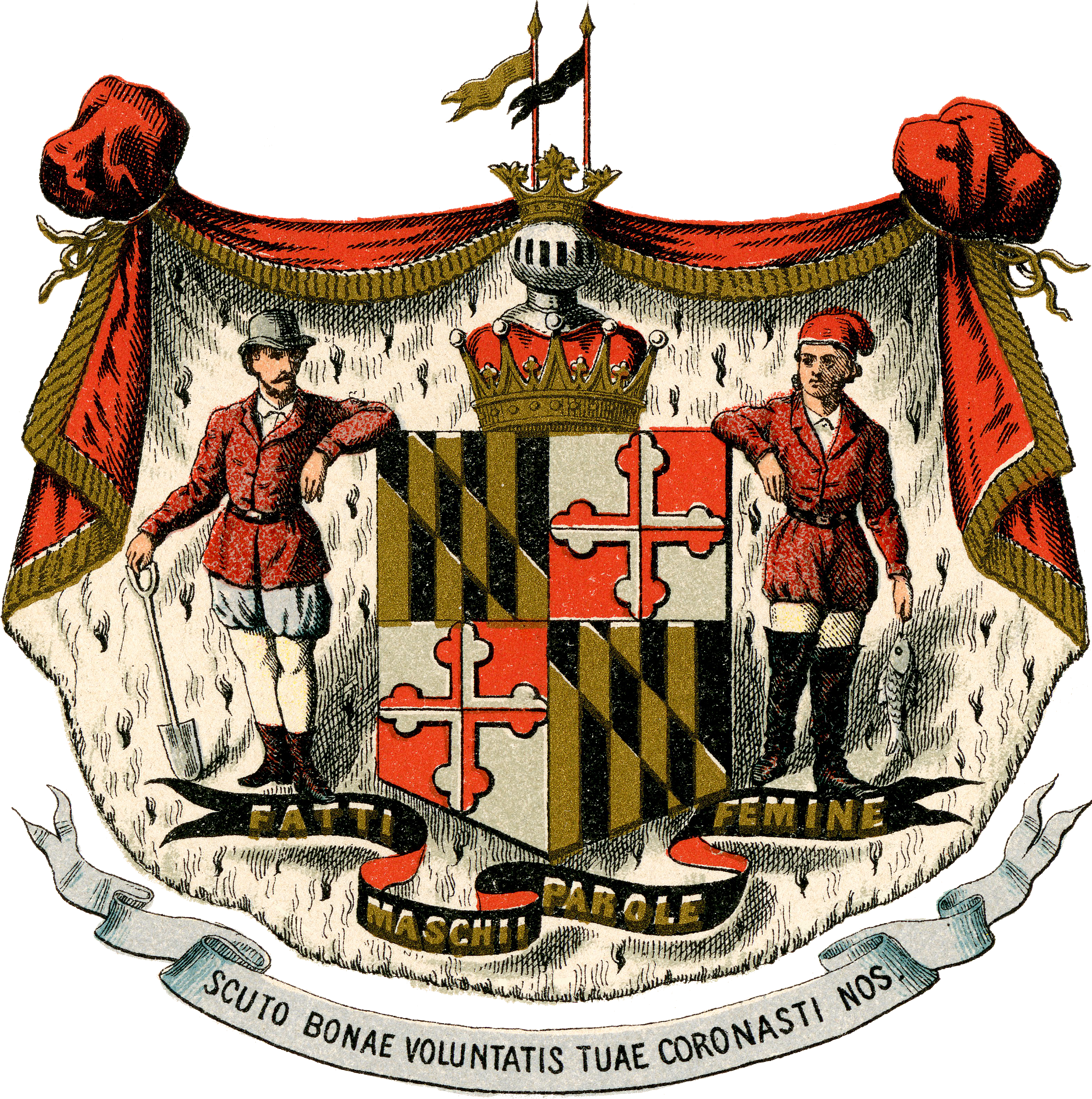
The historical coat of arms of Maryland from 1876.

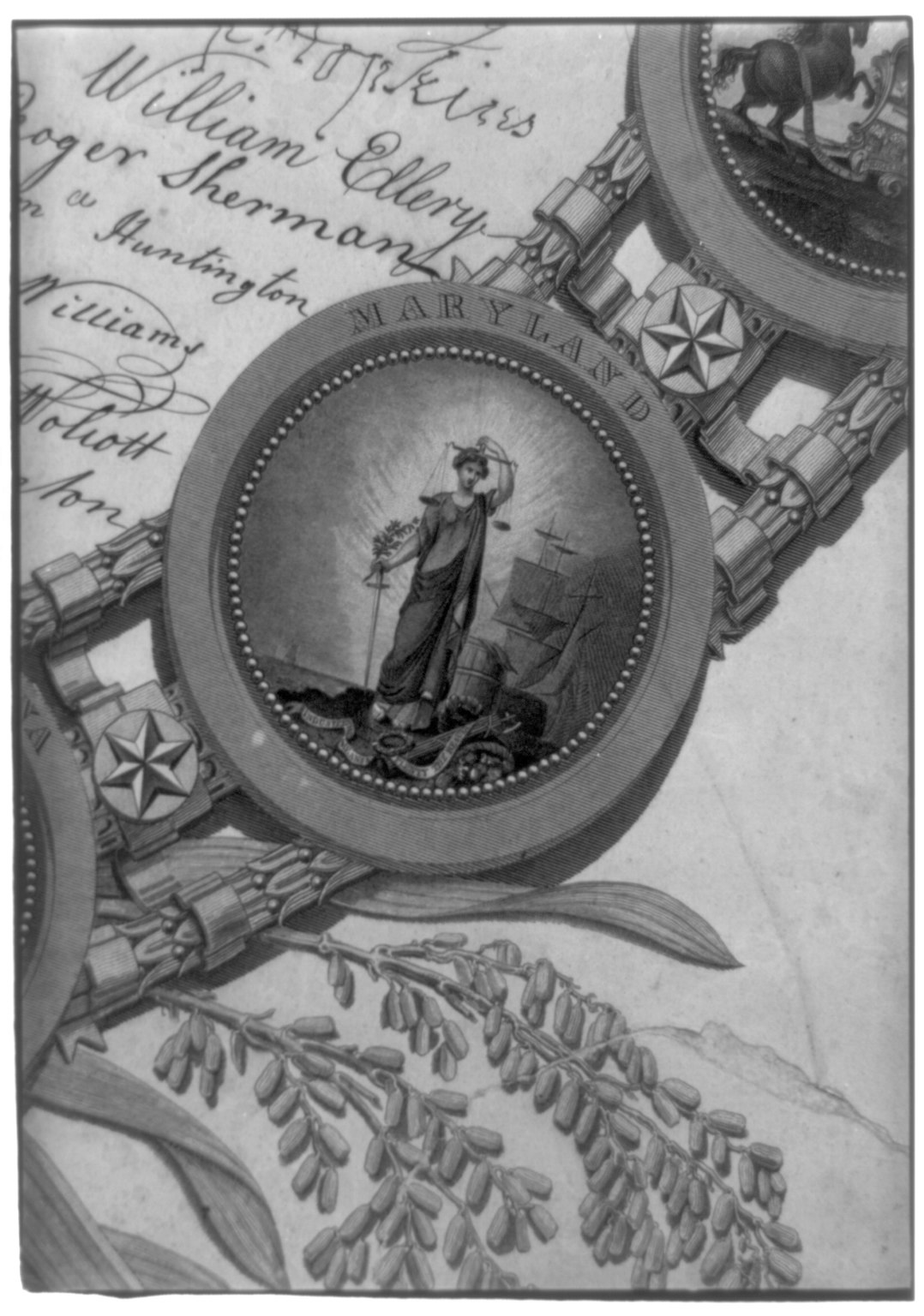
c. 1818 artistic depiction of the 1794 to 1817 state seal of Maryland.

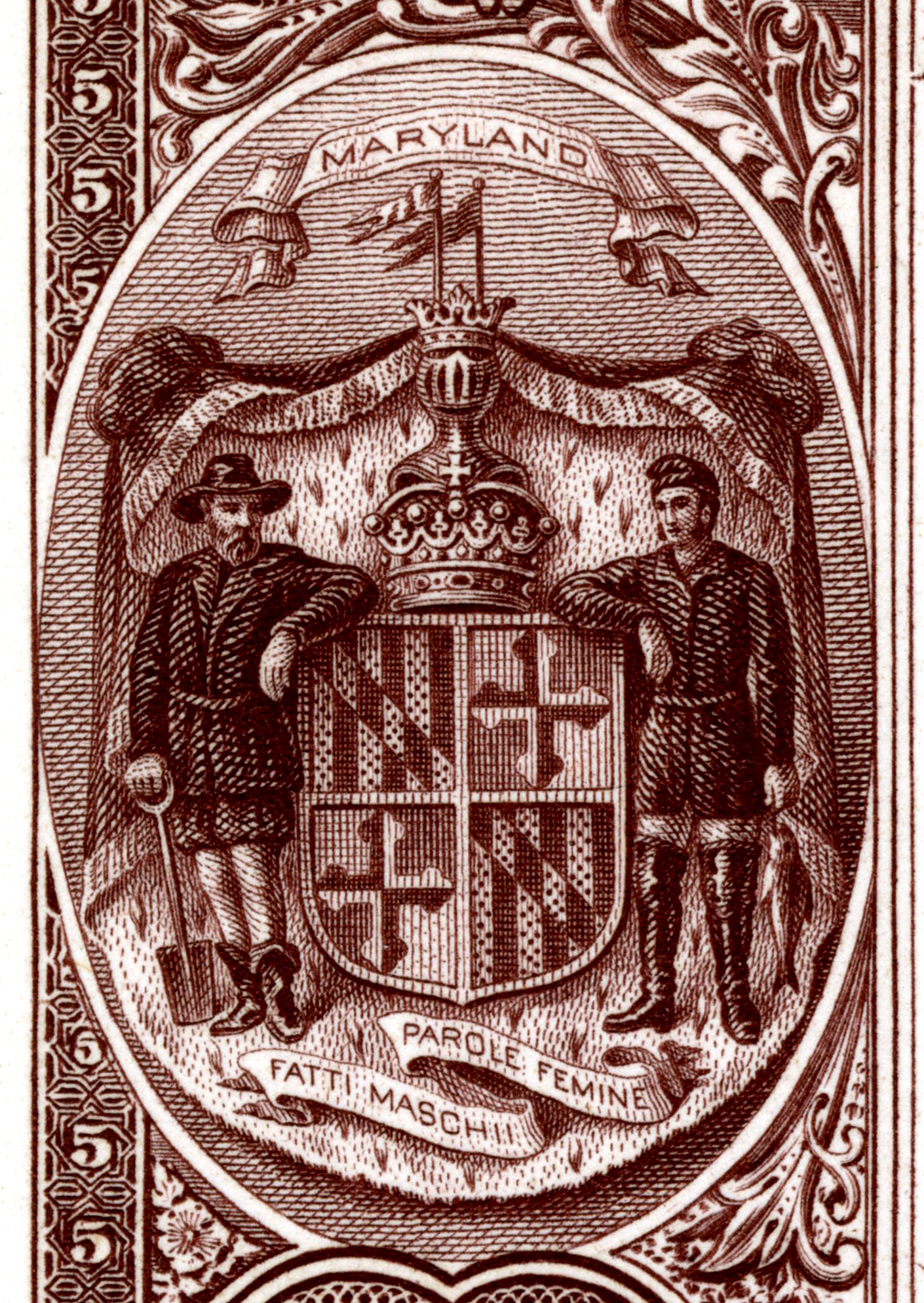
Reverse side of the seal of Maryland on National Bank Note series 1882 BB.

== See also ==
- List of Maryland state symbols
- Flag of Maryland
