= Flag of Maryland =

U.S. state flag

State of Maryland
- Use: Civil and state flag
- Proportion: 2:3
- Adopted: March 9, 1904; 122 years ago
- Design: Heraldic banner of Cecil Calvert, 2nd Baron Baltimore

The flag of Maryland is the official flag of the U.S. state of Maryland and the 17th-century heraldic banner of arms of Cecil, 2nd Baron Baltimore. It consists of the arms of his father George, 1st Baron Baltimore (1579–1632), quartered with those of his grandmother, heiress of the Crossland family. The flag was officially adopted by the Maryland General Assembly in 1904.

== Design and specifications ==
=== Statute ===
Under MD General Provisions Code § 7‑201 (2024), the "Maryland flag" is officially designated as the State flag.

The 2024 Maryland General Provisions Code, § 7‑202 describes the state flag as follows:

"(a) The State flag is divided into quarters.

(b) The first and fourth quarters are a paly of six pieces, or (gold) and sable (black), and a bend dexter (right diagonal band) counterchanged, so that they consist of six alternating gold and black vertical bars with a diagonal band on which the colors are reversed.

(c) The second and third quarters are quartered argent (white) and gules (red), a cross bottony counterchanged, so that they consist of a quartered field of white and red, charged with a Greek cross that has arms terminating in trefoils and opposite coloring so that red is on the white quarters and white is on the red quarters, as represented on the escutcheon of the State seal."

=== Colors ===
For printing, the Secretary of State specifies that the red and yellow colors in the Maryland flag should conform to the following Pantone Matching System standards:

Color scheme coated	Red	White	Gold	Black
Pantone	PMS 201	White	PMS 124	Black
CMYK	0-82-68-38	0-0-0-100	0-27-100-8	0-0-0-0
HEX	#9E1D32	#FFFFFF	#EBAC00	#000000
RGB	158-29-50	255-255-255	235-172-0	0-0-0

Color scheme uncoated	Red	White	Gold	Black
Pantone	PMS 193	White	PMS 124	Black
CMYK	0-95-75-25	0-0-0-100	0-27-100-8	0-0-0-0
HEX	#BF0A30	#FFFFFF	#EBAC00	#000000
RGB	191-10-48	255-255-255	235-171-0	0-0-0

=== Flagpole ornament ===
In 1945, the Maryland General Assembly made a gold cross bottony the official ornament for the top of any flagpole carrying the state flag. Under MD General Provisions Code § 7‑203 (2024), the only permitted ornament on the top of a flagstaff displaying the Maryland state flag is a gold cross bottony.

== History ==
Coat of arms of The 2nd Baron Baltimore

The banner of arms of the Barons Baltimore, now the Maryland state flag, contains the coat of arms of George Calvert, 1st Baron Baltimore in the canton (1st quarter) and the lower fly (4th quarter), while the arms of Alicia Crossland appear in the upper fly and lower hoist (2nd and 3rd quarters).

The arms of George Calvert, a former Secretary of State, were originally granted as a reward for storming a fortification in battle, with the vertical bars symbolizing the palisade.) Because George Calvert's mother was a heraldic heiress, he was entitled to use her Crossland family coat of arms in his own arms. Upon the death of George, 1st Baron Baltimore, in April 1632, the right to bear the arms and banner passed to his eldest son and heir Cecil Calvert, 2nd Baron Baltimore (1605–1675), to whom the Province of Maryland was granted that same year by King Charles I. Hence the use of his banner of arms as the flag.

The heraldic blazon is:

"Quarterly, 1st and 4th, paly of six Or and Sable, a bend counterchanged (for Calvert); 2nd and 3rd, quarterly argent and gules, a cross bottony counterchanged (for Crossland)"

During the colonial period, however, only the gold (yellow) and black Calvert arms were associated with Maryland. The state stopped using the colors following American independence, but they were reintroduced in 1854.

Lord Baltimore's banner, used by Union contingents during the American Civil War.

"Crossland Banner", used by Confederate contingents during the American Civil War.

By the Civil War, the most common design representing all of Maryland consisted of the seal of Maryland on a blue background, which at the time did not include George Calvert's arms (after independence and the discontinuation of the Calvert flag, Maryland was represented by various unofficial banners of unknown specifications).

In the war, both Union and Confederate armies had Maryland contingents with distinctive unit badges. Union troops favored the yellow-and-black Calvert arms, while the Confederate units became associated with the Crossland banner and its bottony cross. When the present flag made its first appearance in 1876, it included both. This may have been a last-minute compromise or, as the modern Maryland Secretary of State suggests, a representation of the reunion of all the state's citizens, 11 years after the war ended.

The first mention of a state flag was in 1817, when it was raised over the dome of the state house. Its design is not known. In September of 1844, the Odd Fellows held a large parade in Philadelphia, with chapters across the country taking part in it. During the march a chapter from Baltimore carried with them a banner bearing the coat of arms of the state.

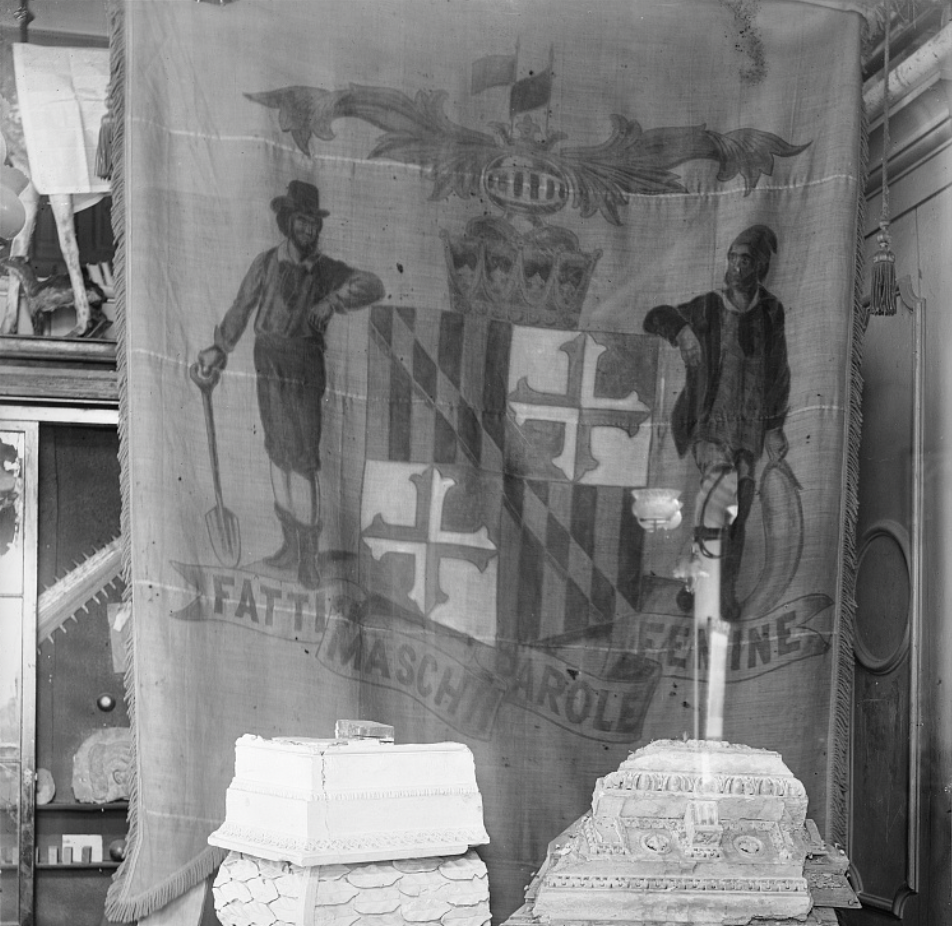
Unofficial state banner, c.1890-1901

Although the current flag was not adopted until 1904, a flag with this design was first flown in 1876 from the Maryland building during the Centennial Exposition. It measured 3 x 4 feet. A second state flag was flown in Baltimore, on October 11, 1880, at a parade marking the 150th anniversary of the founding of Baltimore (1729–1730). The flag was flown again on October 25, 1888, at the Gettysburg Battlefield during ceremonies dedicating monuments to the Maryland regiments of the Army of the Potomac by reorganized regiments of the former state militia, now the Maryland National Guard. The flag made another appearance at the Pan-American Exposition in 1901.

In 2001, a survey conducted by the North American Vexillological Association placed Maryland's flag fourth best in design quality out of the 72 flags of the provinces of Canada, the U.S. states, and the territories of the United States. It finished behind the flags of New Mexico, Texas and Quebec respectively.

== Uses ==
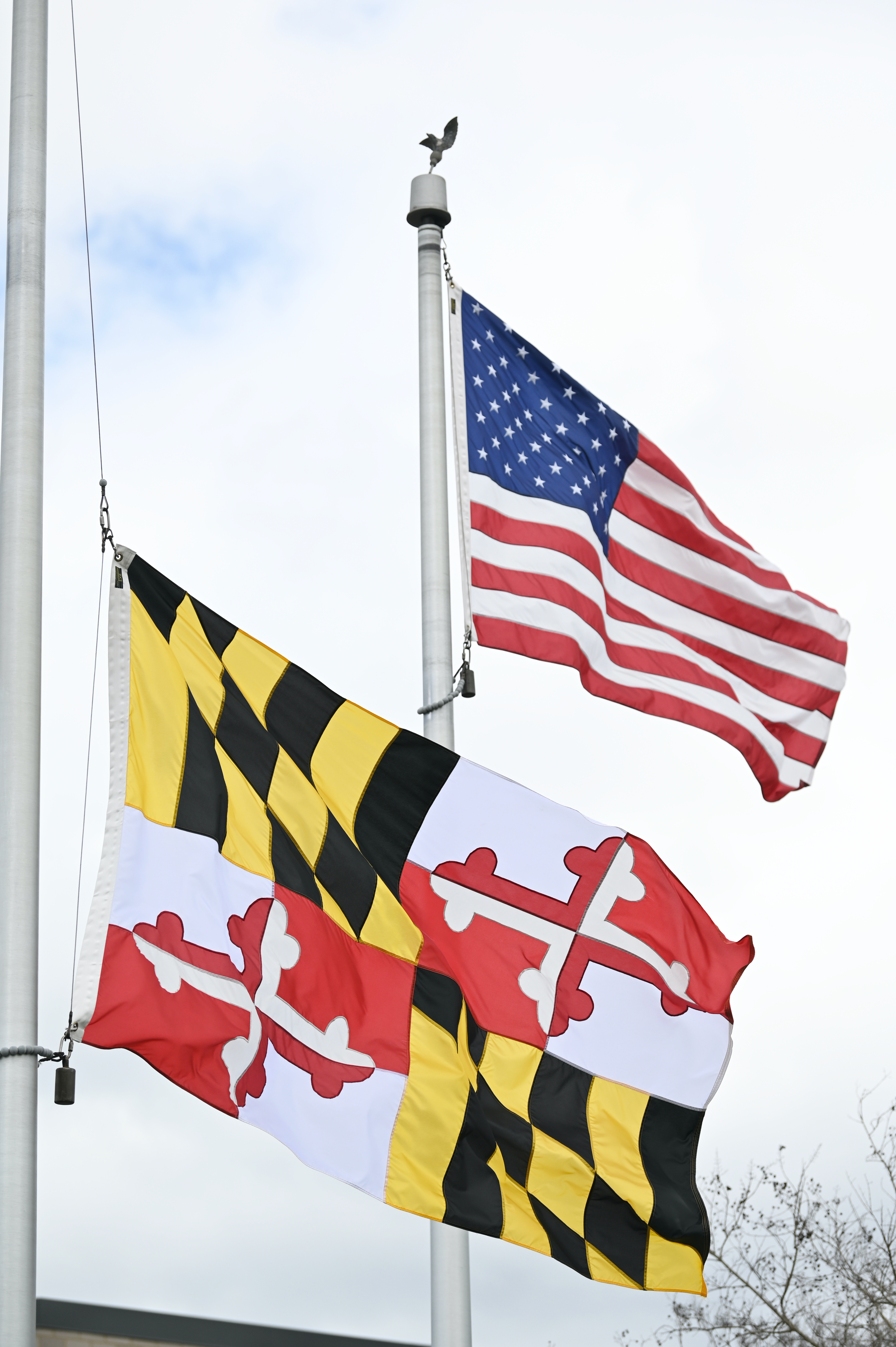
The Maryland state flag flying alongside the U.S. flag in 2024

The Calvert and Crossland arms and banner, and the Maryland flag itself, have been adapted for use in various ways across the state.

=== Official ===
- The gold and black Calvert coat of arms and red and white Crossland coat of arms are featured in the seal of the town of Ferryland, Newfoundland, the present-day site of Calvert's Colony of Avalon.
- Some Maryland counties and municipalities have arms and/or flags incorporating various elements of the arms, including the city of Baltimore, as well as Calvert, Caroline, Baltimore, and Worcester counties.
- From 1986 to 2010, Maryland's standard issue license plates were white with black lettering and a central seal with the flag's unique design. The 1986 plates are still valid and widely seen after being temporarily replaced by a design commemorating the bicentennial of the War of 1812, which had its Chesapeake Campaign in the state. On Monday, September 26, 2016, Maryland offered the option to replace the commemorative War of 1812 license plates with plates featuring a flowing Maryland flag beneath tag number. Maryland driver's licenses also use the pattern of the state flag.
- The flag of the short-lived Republic of Maryland—a state established by the Maryland State Colonization Society to "repatriate" freed slaves in Africa—also used Calvert's black and yellow.
- The checkered Lord Baltimore banner appears as a decorative flash on the tails (vertical stabilizers) of the KC-135R aircraft belonging to the Air Force Reserve's 459th Air Refueling Wing at Joint Base Andrews, MD. Likewise the flash appears on the 459th ARW patch.
- The Calvert and Crossland arms are used on the Emblem of the Maryland Wing, Civil Air Patrol.

=== Education ===
- The school colors of Calvert School, an independent school in Baltimore City, are black and gold.
- Goucher College incorporates the flag in its seal.
- The seal of Johns Hopkins University in Baltimore features the same design and colors as the Maryland flag. The Johns Hopkins colors are sable and gold, taken from the Calvert coat of arms (though the athletic colors are blue and white, as the school mascot is the blue jay).
- The shield of Loyola University Maryland (formerly Loyola College) utilizes both the Calvert shield in its upper-left quadrant, as well as a stylized red and yellow quadrant, symbolic of the Maryland state flag.
- The school colors of Towson University, a member of the University System of Maryland, are black and gold, and the university seal incorporates the Calvert and Crossland shield.
- The University of Maryland, Baltimore County (UMBC), also in the University System of Maryland, uses all four colors in its main logo.

=== Sport ===
- An alternate logo of the Baltimore Ravens professional football team in the National Football League is a shield with alternating Calvert and Crossland Banners interlocked with a stylized "B" and "R".
- The University of Maryland, College Park athletic teams have long used the colors of the state flag. All four colors from the flag are currently used, with the primary colors being red and white, with black and gold used as accent colors. The Maryland flag is also displayed on the right shoulder of the football uniforms. At the start of the 2011 football season, the team unveiled a new uniform designed by Baltimore-based sportswear company Under Armour combining both parts of the flag. Similarly, the men's lacrosse team features designs from the flag on the jersey shoulders.
- Beginning on September 9, 2008, the University of Maryland painted both end zones at SECU Stadium with the flag's two patterns.
- The Baltimore Dragon Boat Club features the flag motif in its logo.
- Starting with the 2009 season, the Baltimore Orioles major league baseball club has added a patch to the left arm of their uniforms that features a round version of the Maryland flag.
- Maryland-based company Under Armour released a line of cleats in 2017, with the Crossland coat of arms design incorporated into the cleats. Under Armour bags also incorporate the flag in its design starting in late 2015 and is seen at its outlet mall locations.
- Junior Hockey teams Maryland Black Bears (NAHL) and Team Maryland (EHL) sport the flag on their team jerseys.

=== Other ===
- Southwest Airlines painted a Boeing 737-700 in a Maryland state flag theme in 2005, dubbed Maryland One in recognition of the airline's hub in Baltimore.
- The world's only full size chain mail/scale mail Maryland flag was created by Brian Galloway, a retired U.S. Air Force veteran from Cecil County. It is 7 by 3.5 feet (2.1 m × 1.1 m), consisting of over 22,000 individual aluminum scales, over 45,000 rings, and weighs close to 30 pounds (14 kg).
- The flag, as a coat of arms, is used on the state's welcome sign.
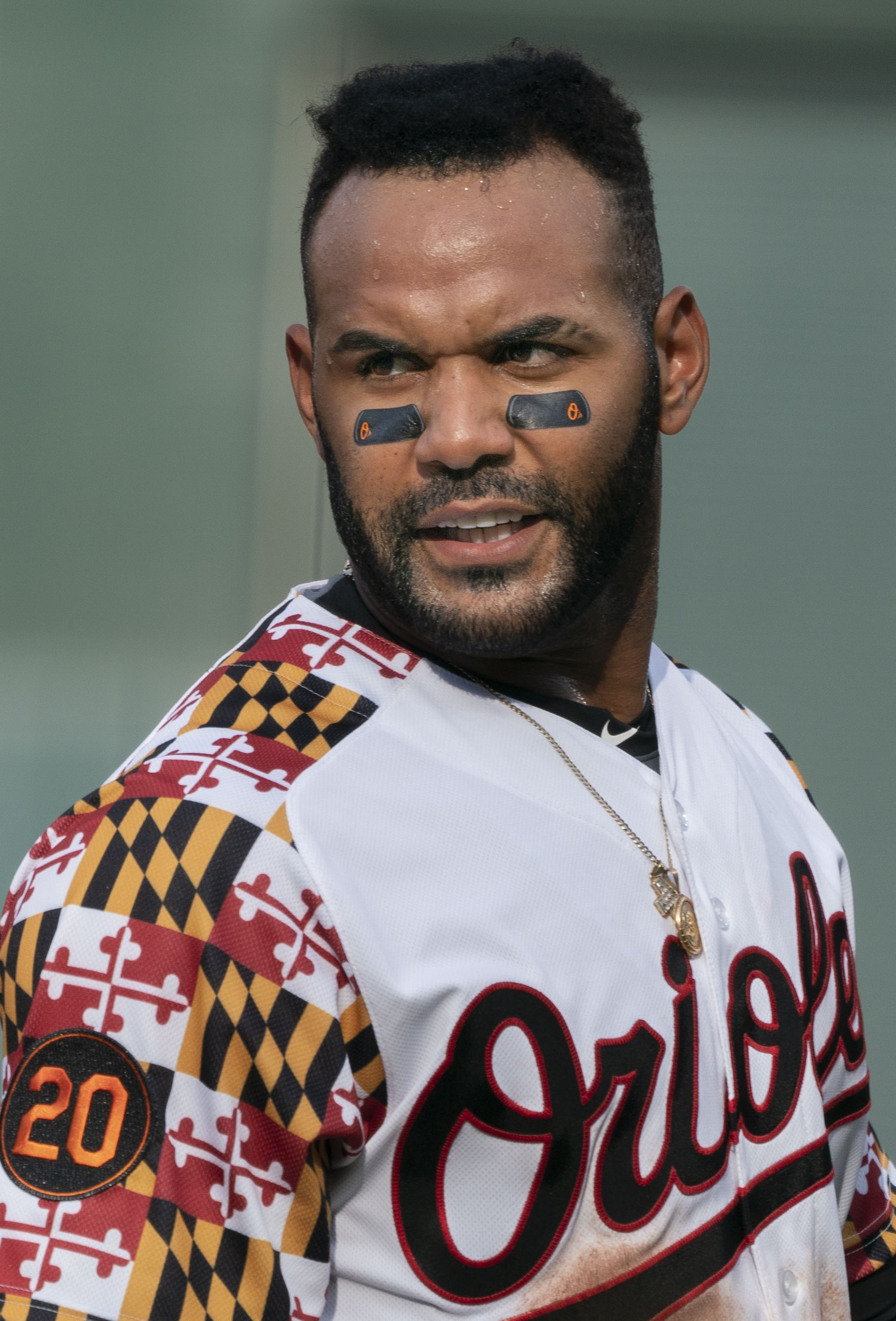
Baltimore Orioles jersey worn by second baseman Jonathan Villar

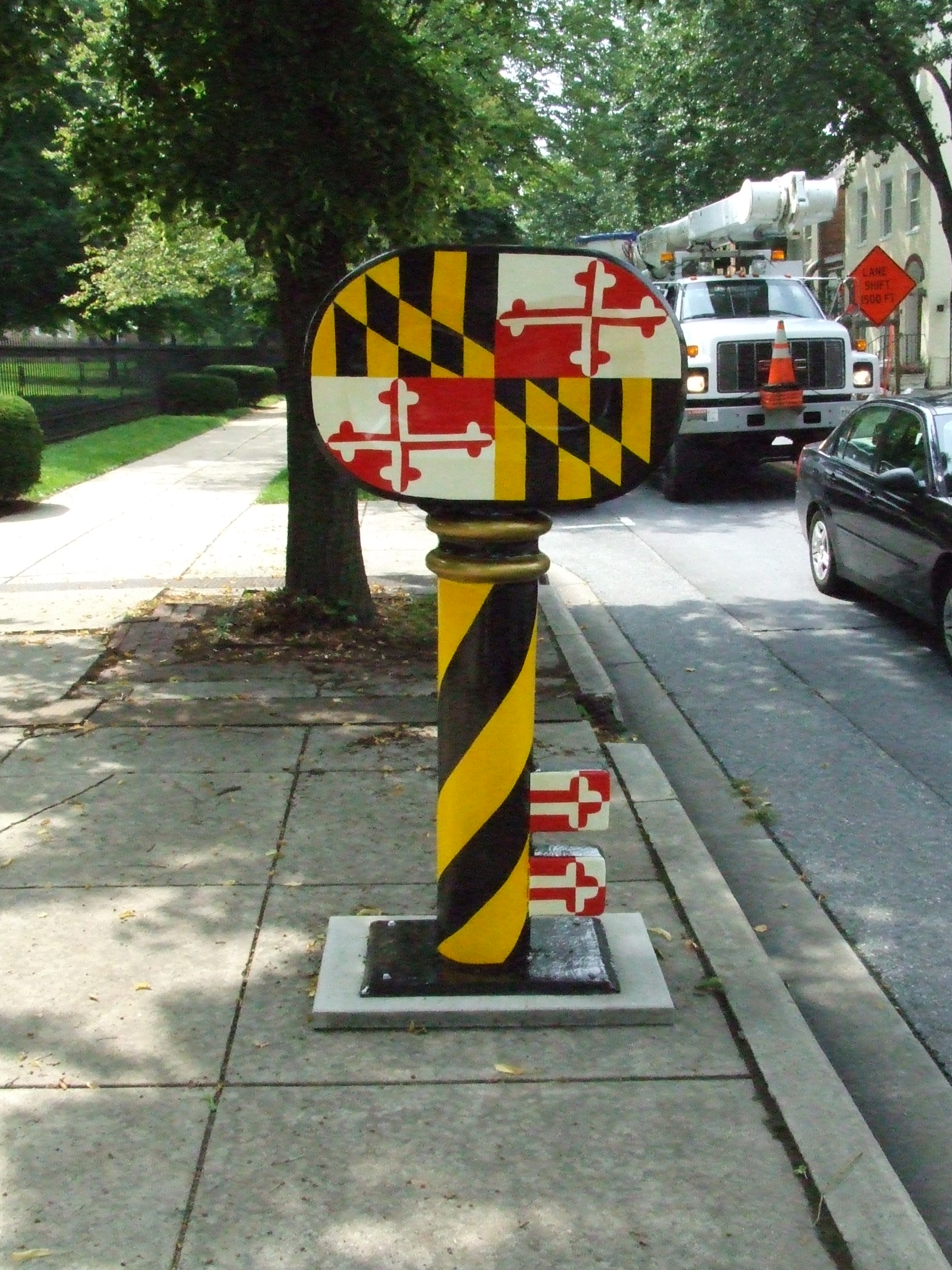
Key sculpture in Frederick, Maryland

Flag of the Maryland National Guard

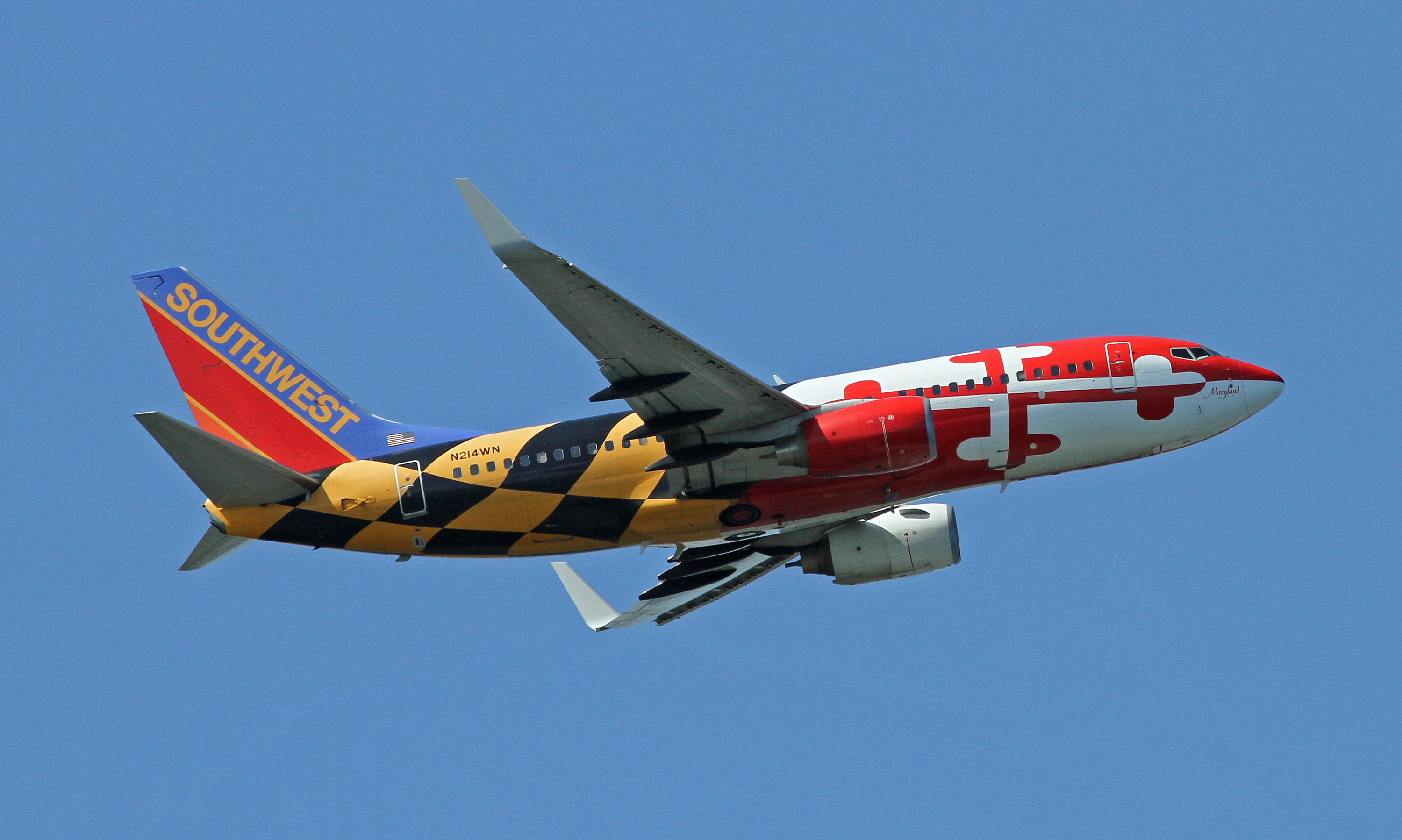
The state flag on a Southwest Airlines Boeing 737-700 plane called "Maryland One"

The Maryland state flag as depicted in the 1976 bicentennial postage stamp series

== See also ==
- List of Maryland state symbols
- Flag of Montgomery County, Maryland
- Flag of Prince George’s County, Maryland
