= William D. Romanowski =

William D. Romanowski (born August 2, 1954) is an American academic and media critic. He served as the Arthur H. DeKruyter Chair in Communication at Calvin University.

Romanowski studied at Indiana University of Pennsylvania and Youngstown State University before obtaining a PhD at Bowling Green State University. He came to Calvin in 1988, and remained there until his retirement in 2020.

Romanowski has written a number of books, including Eyes Wide Open: Looking for God in Popular Culture (Brazos Press, 2001), Reforming Hollywood: How American Protestants Fought for Freedom at the Movies (Oxford University Press, 2012), and Cinematic Faith: A Christian Perspective on Movies and Meaning (Baker Academic, 2019).

Eyes Wide Open won the Evangelical Christian Publishers Association's Gold Medallion Book Award for Christianity and Society in 2012, while Reforming Hollywood won the Religious Communication Association's 2013 Book of the Year award,

Writing about Cinematic Faith, Justin Bailey notes that "Romanowski is characteristically Reformed in his analysis. He grounds his appreciation of film in the image of God and the creation mandate."
