= Dina Rabinovitch =

British journalist and writer

- Born: 9 June 1962; Charleston, South Carolina, U.S.
- Died: 30 October 2007 (aged 45); London, England
- Cause of death: Breast cancer
- Education: London School of Economics (BA); University of East Anglia (MA)
- Occupation: Journalist
- Spouse(s): Guido Rauch (divorced); Anthony Julius
- Children: 4
- Father: Nahum Rabinovitch

Dina Rabinovitch (9 June 1962 – 30 October 2007) was a British journalist and writer who wrote a column for The Guardian.

== Early life and education ==
Born in Charleston, South Carolina, she was the fifth of six children born to the Halakhist Rabbi, Nahum Rabinovitch. The family later moved to Toronto for a short period before settling in London. Rabinovitch was educated at Hasmonean High School and Henrietta Barnett School. She earned a Bachelor of Arts in International Relations from the London School of Economics in 1993 and Master of Arts in Creative Writing from the University of East Anglia in 2000.

== Career ==
After graduating from the London School of Economics, Rabinovitch worked as a freelance journalist before joining The Independent. After the birth of her first child, Rabinovitch returned to freelance writing, specializing in interviews. Rabinovitch later joined The Guardian, writing a regular column for the G2 blog.

== Personal life ==
An Orthodox Jew, she lived in London with her second husband, lawyer Anthony Julius, with whom she had one child and through whom she had four stepchildren. With her first husband, financier Guido Rauch, she had three daughters.

Rabinovitch, who died of breast cancer on 30 October 2007, aged 45, wrote regular columns describing her cancer-related experiences. These columns were published as the book Take Off Your Party Dress in March 2007. Proceeds from the sale of the book go to the CTRT Appeal, a million-pound appeal to set up a cancer trials research centre at Mount Vernon Hospital in London.
