= Brith Sholom Beth Israel Synagogue =

Orthodox synagogue in Charleston, South Carolina

Brith Sholom Beth Israel
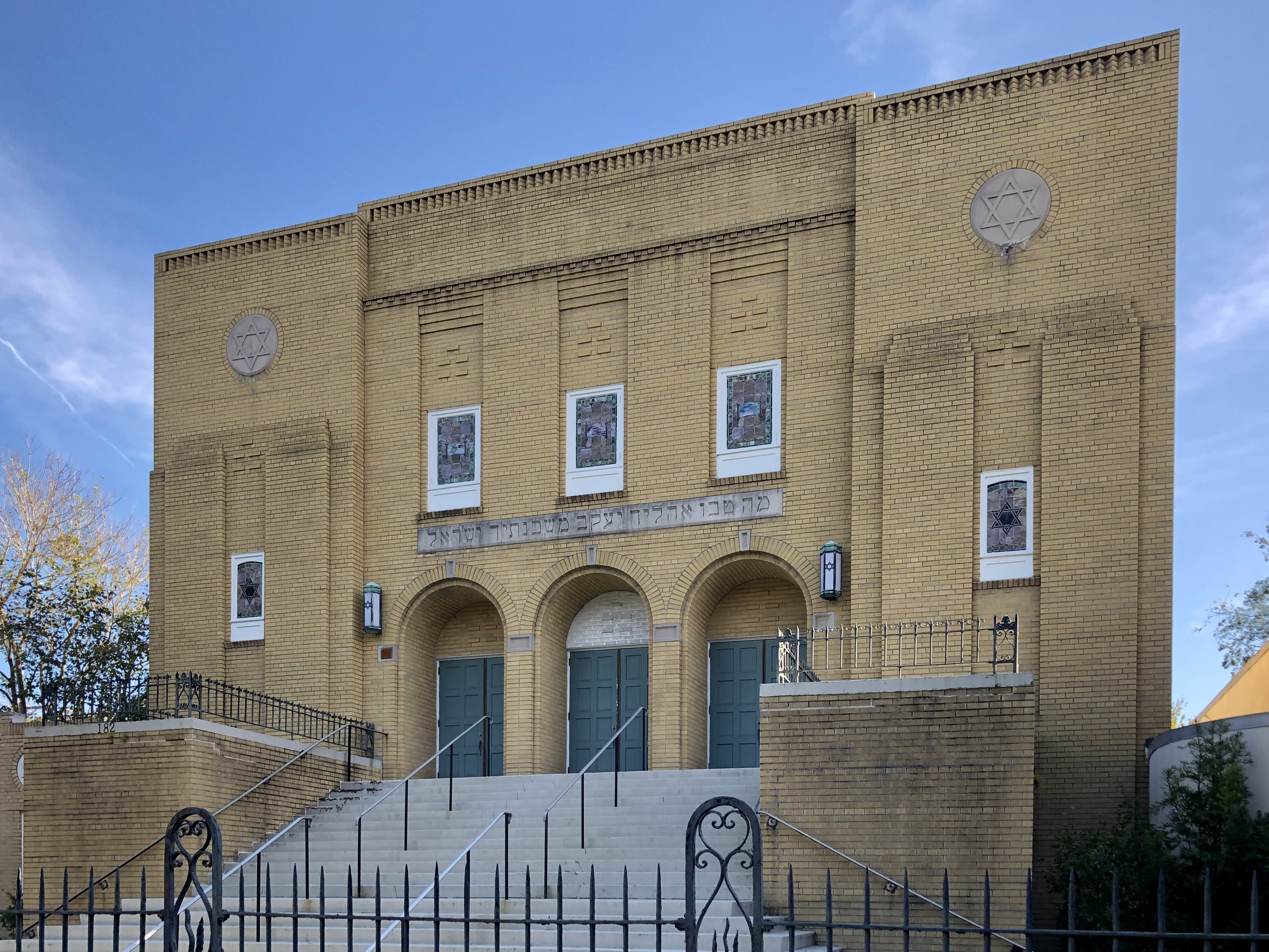
- Synagogue in 2019

Religion
- Affiliation: Judaism
- Sect: Orthodox

Location
- Location: 182 Rutledge Avenue, Charleston, South Carolina, United States
- Interactive map of Brith Sholom Beth Israel
- Coordinates: 32.787579°N 79.946082°W

Architecture
- Founder: Hirsch Zvi Levine
- Established: 1852
- Completed: 1948

Brith Sholom Beth Israel Synagogue (Hebrew: ברית שלום–בית ישראל, lit. 'Covenant of Peace–House of Israel') is an Orthodox Jewish synagogue in Charleston, South Carolina. Its congregation was founded in 1852, and its current location has been in use 1948. It is located in the Charleston Historic District and is the oldest continuously operating Ashkenazi Jewish congregation in the United States.

== History ==
=== Formation and Civil War ===
In the early 1850s, German and Polish Jews founded Berith Shalome, a small congregation led by recent emigrant to America, Hirsch Zvi Levine. It was created in response to the largely Sephardic Jewish community already extant in the area, as the two communities had different rites of worship. Many other Eastern European Jews came to Brith Sholom and prayed in the Polish minhag, feeling that Shearith Israel, the Sephardic synagogue, had been acculturated to the New World. All three had been founded in opposition to the 18th-century Kahal Kadosh Beth Elohim, the Reform Jewish congregation in Charleston and one of the oldest synagogues in the United States. The congregation applied for a Charter of Incorporation in June 1856 as a formal organization, and it was granted by the city in January of the following year.

During the American Civil War, Brith Sholom was the only congregation to remain open in the city, and it housed soldiers consistently for all four years. In the 1870s, a synagogue was constructed on 145 St. Philip Street, where a large portion of Jews in the city lived. It was designed by architect John Henry Devereux.

=== Breakaway congregations ===
In the late 19th century, many congregants were dissatisfied with the level of observance and broke away in 1886 and became "Shari Emouna" (Hebrew: שערי אמונה, lit. 'Gates of Faith'). A reconciliation was made and they merged back into the main congregation in 1897.

In 1911, Beth Israel was founded as a breakaway synagogue by Russian Jewish immigrants in Charleston. The majority had come from the village of Kałuszyn (then-Kalushin, part of the Russian Empire), and had formed a mutual aid society and spoke Yiddish apart from many of earlier immigrants to the area. and the two congregations merged in 1955.

== Leadership ==
Rabbis and Chazzans for Brith Sholom throughout history include:

- Rabbi Hirsch Zvi Levine (1852–1873)
- Rabbi Barnet Rubin (1873–1874)
- Chazzan Moses Spertner (1860)

...

- Rabbi Nachum L. Rabinovitch (1955–1963)
- Rabbi Hersh M. Galinski (1963–1970)
- Rabbi David J. Radinsky (1970–2004)
- Rabbi Art Sytner (2004–2012)
- Rabbi Moshe Davis (2012–2020)
- Rabbi Scott Hoberman (2020–2023)
- Rabbi Yosef Bart (2023–present)

== Architecture ==
The current synagogue building utilized since 1948 features three brick arches surrounding entrance doors with concave keystones at the top of each. Above the entrances to the building is an inset of stone with the opening phrase of Ma Tovu (Numbers 24:5) written on it: Hebrew: מה טובו אהליך יעקב משכנותיך ישראל, romanized: Ma tovu, ohalecha Yaakov, mishkenotecha Yisrael, lit. 'How goodly are your tents, O Jacob, your dwelling places, O Israel!'. The surrounding top and sides of the façade feature windows of stained glass and multiple stone ornaments of the Star of David.
