= Giyur Kehalacha =

Giyur KeHalacha (also stylised Giyur K'Halacha) is an Israeli-based organisation offering conversions outside of the state mandated Chief Rabbinate. It has elicited controversy around its desire to decentralise the conversion process and is associated with the Tzohar network of rabbis. At present they have received wide support around the Jewish world. but the Chief Rabbis are unwilling to accept their authority.

== Creation ==
The organisation was started by a series of rabbis who wanted to challenge the existing monopoly that the Chief Rabbinate had over conversions to Judaism. These included rabbis Seth Farber, Chuck Davidson and Nahum Rabinovitch.

The organisation soon grew with the addition of several high-profile rabbis, including rabbis David Stav, Shlomo Riskin, Nahum Rabinovitch and Yisrael Rosen, amongst others.

The organisation has continued to grow, and as of the beginning of 2019 there are more than 70 rabbis who are actively converting people, with a particular focus on children prior to their bar or bat mitzvah.

== Legality ==
In the Knesset, Elazar Stern presented a bill to legalise an alternative path to conversions outside of the Chief Rabbinate, although significant opposition existed to the passing of the law from the Haredi political parties, and their pressure was sufficient to prevent the bill passing into law. However, the status of the people converted by Giyur KeHalacha is a significant struggle today in Israel, with efforts, both legislative and legal, ongoing.

These political-legal manoeuvrings are significant in Israel since Halacha is strongly entwined in the day-to-day running of the state, and specifically the Chief Rabbinate, which controls the conversion process, and uses this power to decide who can get married, and who can be buried in a Jewish cemetery.

== Halacha ==
Giyur KeHalacha follows Orthodox Halacha, while easing some of the harsh restrictions of the large centralised beth dins. In addition to Giyur KeHalacha there are other independent conversion courts, such as Ahavat HaGer.

== Controversy ==
The Chief Rabbinate courted significant controversy when they cancelled many of the conversions performed under the auspices of Giyur KeHalacha, or otherwise not accepting conversions done by the group. When the Supreme Court rejected the cancelling of conversions, the Haredi communities attempted to pass a new law to by-pass the courts.

In Australia, the local rabbis refused to accept the conversions performed through the Beth din of rabbi Yisrael Rosen, a member of Tzohar and Giyur Kehalacha.
