= Creation mandate =

Biblical commandments

In Reformed Christian ethics, the creation mandates or creation ordinances are the commandments given to Adam and Eve in Genesis 1 and 2. These predate the Mosaic Law and are often thought to apply to all people rather than just Christians. They include the cultural mandate ("Be fruitful and multiply!"), including both marriage and procreation (Gen 1:28), the labour mandate (Gen 2:15), and complying with Sabbath (Gen 2:3).

These mandates are considered by many to be superseded by the Noahic Mandates in Genesis 9. Of note is that Adam was told to "subdue" the Earth, but Noah was not. This suggests that Fallen Man is incapable of subduing Earth without exploiting it contrary to God's Plan.

== See also ==
- Natalism
