= Jewish views on contraception =

Religious views on birth control

The Jewish view on birth control currently varies between the Orthodox, Conservative and Reform branches of Judaism. Among Orthodox Judaism, use of birth control has been considered only acceptable for use in limited circumstances. Conservative Judaism, while generally encouraging its members to follow the traditional Jewish views on birth control has been more willing to allow greater exceptions regarding its use to fit better within modern society. Reform Judaism has generally been the most liberal with regard to birth control allowing individual followers to use their own judgment in what, if any, birth control methods they might wish to employ.

Regulations regarding contraception affect the traditional streams of Judaism (including the Haredi and Modern Orthodox varieties) more so than others because of their strict adherence to Halakhah, or Jewish law. These regulations affect liberal strains of Judaism (including the Reform, Reconstructionist, and Conservative movements; particularly in Western society) much less, where the emphasis is on applying Halakhah to modern life rather than observing it strictly. Many modern Jews feel that the benefits of contraception, be they female health, family stability, or disease prevention, uphold the commandment in Judaism to "choose life" much more strongly than they violate the commandment to "be fruitful and multiply".

== Orthodox Judaism ==
Among traditional interpretations of the Torah, active prevention of pregnancy is in violation of the commandment "be fruitful and multiply" (Genesis 1:28). Some Rabbinic authorities further consider the possibility (generally not accepted) that a union that by definition cannot lead to pregnancy would amount to "spilling seed", the sin of Onan ( Genesis 38:9–10). A woman's obligation being overridden in Jewish law by the danger of childbirth which opens up the option of them taking steps toward preventing pregnancy.

The option of contraception is raised by the Talmud (Tractate Yevamot 12b), where the use of a pessary(the talmud describes it as a "contraceptive resorbent" made from "soft fabric") is discussed for women who are too young to get pregnant, presently pregnant, or nursing. In each case, either the woman or her child is at risk for serious complications, and this is the basis for many rabbinic authorities permitting contraception in situations where pregnancy would seriously harm the woman. In those cases, the most "natural" method is preferred; as the use of a condom or pessary creates a physical barrier, "the pill" (or an intrauterine device) is preferred by most authorities. Fertility awareness methods (modern improvements over the rhythm method) are difficult to use, because many infertile days coincide with the ritually impure days of niddah.

Orthodox rabbis believe that the positive commandment of being fruitful and multiplying is a male obligation. Consequently, wives may choose abstinence as birth control, but husbands are not permitted to decline their wives if they are not in niddah. Along with that, if the commandment for men to procreate is not fulfilled, women may not be allowed to go on birth control.

Contraceptive measures that lead to male sterility, are not ever permitted for their interfering with a man's obligation, only ever being permitted in life-threatening circumstances for the man such as some forms of cancer. For example, a crushed or mangled man may not be permitted to marry anyone but a convert under Jewish law, and halachic authorities see vasectomy as a form of maiming, even if already married to a non-convert becoming maimed intentionally or accidentally including a vasectomy does obligate divorce unless a successful repair surgery is performed and sperm flow is returned (based on Deuteronomy 23:2).

When Orthodox Jewish couples contemplate the use of contraceptives, they generally consult a rabbi competent on this topic who evaluates the need for the intervention and which method is preferable from a halachic point of view.

The Midrash of Genesis speaks of the origins of oral contraceptives: "In the early time of creation, in the time of Lemech, a medicine was known, the taking of which prevented a woman's conception."

Inasmuch as the strict letter of the law, as understood by classic authorities, does not obligate the fathering of limitless number of children beyond the requirement to produce at least one child of each gender or according to another opinion until two male offspring are born, there is wide latitude within halacha to limit family sizes, although usage of contraception varies from community to community.

Many Modern Orthodox authorities are inclined to permit contraception for a broad array of reasons, with some arguing that a couple may decide to delay procreation even without specific rabbinic permission.

The birthrate in Orthodox Judaism is significantly higher than for Reform Judaism.

== Hormonal contraception ==
Generally, the introduction of hormonal contraception in the 1960s did not cause the stir within Jewish circles that it caused in other religious groups. A number of responsa from rabbinic decisors (poskim) outlined the proper approach to the new phenomenon. There has been little talk of the potential risk of increased promiscuity (z'nut).

An innovative use of the combined oral contraceptive pill in Judaism is employed by some young brides. The laws of family purity prohibit sexual intercourse while a woman is menstruating (see niddah). In order to decrease the chance of menstruation occurring just before (or on) the wedding night, some brides briefly regulate their periods in the months leading up to their wedding.

== Male contraception ==
In the Mishneh Torah, Hilchot Issurei (21:18)–which is part of the Maimonides' Law Code from the medieval period–it is stated that expending semen for no purpose is forbidden as a man holds the sole responsibility in the act of procreation. Because the commandant for this duty rests on the man, any form of male contraception or sterilization is prohibited by Traditional Jewish Law. However, liberal figures and authorities encourage male contraception when the use of contraception is important for the safety and health of the man and his partner. In this regard, these authorities prioritize human health and safety over the male's duty to procreate.
