= List of flags by color combination =

This is a list of flags of states, territories, former, religious and other geographic entities (plus a few non-geographic flags) sorted by their combinations of dominant colors. Flags emblazoned with seals, coats of arms, and other multicolored emblems are sorted only by their color fields. The color of text is almost entirely ignored.

Colors white and gold, related to the two metals of European heraldry (argent and or) are sorted first. The five major colors of European heraldry (black, red, green, blue, and purple) are sorted next. Miscellaneous colors (murrey, tan, grey, and pink) are sorted last.

Similar colors are grouped together to make navigation of this list practical. As such, the dark greens prevalent in the Middle East are sorted together with the brighter greens prevalent in Western Europe. Significantly, yellows, golds, and oranges are grouped together as "gold" due to the lack of discrete divisions within this spectrum and the differing standards of interpretation of "gold", which appears in the legally codified specifications of many flags. Some flags, including a number from South Asia, include both a distinct yellow and a distinct orange; these have been noted accordingly. Magenta is included with red.

== White ==
- White flag, internationally recognised as a sign of truce, ceasefire, and surrender. The flag of the Kingdom of France in 1814–1830, during the Bourbon Restoration.
- Arkhangelsk, Russia (with multicolored coat of arms)
- Afghanistan (with black text)
- Afghanistan (with Pashto subtext)
- Ahrar al-Sham, flag used since early 2016 (with green and black text)
- Buenos Aires, Argentina (with multicolored coat of arms)
- Ciudad del Este, Paraguay (with multicolored coat of arms)
- Gniezno, Poland (with multicolored coat of arms), as well as its gmina
- Illinois, United States (with multicolored coat of arms)
- Jabhat Fatah al-Sham (with black text)
- Jakarta, Indonesia (with multicolored coat of arms)
- Jujuy Province, Argentina (with multicolored coat of arms)
- Lambaré, Paraguay (with multicolored coat of arms)
- Mariano Roque Alonso, Paraguay (with multicolored coat of arms)
- Massachusetts, United States (with multicolored coat of arms)
- Mombasa, Kenya (with multicolored coat of arms)
- Poznań, Poland (with multicolored coat of arms)
- Prussia, Germany (1803–1892) (with multicolored coat of arms)
- Queretaro, Mexico (with multicolored coat of arms)
- Quintana Roo, Mexico (with multicolored coat of arms)
- Saint Barthélemy, French overseas collectivity, unofficial (with multicolored coat of arms)
- San Luis, Argentina (with multicolored coat of arms)
- Siberian Federal District (multicolored coat of arms)
- Tulsa, Oklahoma, United States (1973–2018) (with multicolored emblems)

=== White, gold ===
- Banten Sultanate (1527–1813)
- Bhutan (with distinct yellow and orange)
- Hanover (1837–1946)
- Hindu flag (with distinct orange)
- Jacksonville, Florida, United States (with a distinct gold and orange and a brown emblem)
- Jalalyan Dynasty of Armenia
- Jerusalem cross – flag used by several Crusader states
- Kędzierzyn-Koźle, Poland (with multicolored coat of arms)
- Mamluk Sultanate (1250–1517)
- Nagano Prefecture, Japan
- Quiché, Guatemala
- San Francisco, California, United States (with multicolored emblem)
- Silesia and Lower Silesia
- Sulawesi, Indonesia
- Vatican City (with multicolored emblem)

=== White, gold, black ===
- Baltimore, Maryland, United States
- Brunei (1906–1959)
- Lower Silesian Voivodeship, Poland
- Loyalty Islands Province, New Caledonia
- Norfolk, England, United Kingdom
- Perak, Malaysia
- Russian Empire (1858–1896)
- Sutherland, Scotland, United Kingdom
- Tarnowskie Góry, Poland

=== White, gold, black, red ===
- Brunei
- Buckinghamshire, England, United Kingdom
- Egypt
- Flemish Brabant, Belgium
- Glarus, Switzerland
- Kanta-Häme, Finland
- Maryland, United States
- Miranda State, Venezuela (with multicolored emblem)
- Papua New Guinea
- Patani United Liberation Organisation (original)
- Patani United Liberation Organisation (1989–2005)
- Pattani United Liberation Organisation (2005–present)
- Shaiva flag (with distinct gold and red)
- 's-Hertogenbosch, Netherlands
- Skała, Poland
- Syria (1972–1980)
- Tamil Eelam
- Timor-Leste
- Uganda (with multicolored emblem)
- United States Marine Corps
- Wejherowo County, Poland

=== White, gold, black, red, blue ===
- Ain, France
- Antigua and Barbuda
- Bedfordshire, England, United Kingdom
- Bonaire, Caribbean Netherlands
- Charente-Maritime, France
- Republic of China (1912–1949)
- Reformed Government of the Republic of China (1938–1940)
- Reorganized National Government of China (1940–1943)
- East Anglia, England, United Kingdom
- Eswatini
- Graubünden, Switzerland
- Herm, one of the British Channel Islands
- Lot, France
- Manchukuo (1932–1945)
- Melekeok, state of Palau
- Moselle, France
- Nunavut, Canada
- Podkarpackie Voivodeship, Poland
- Rhône, France
- São Paulo, Brazil
- Western Australia, Australia

=== White, gold, black, red, blue, grey ===
- Airai, state of Palau

=== White, gold, black, red, green, blue ===
- Angaur, state of Palau
- Bubi people
- Choiseul, province of Solomon Islands
- East African Community
- Ngiwal, state of Palau
- Karlino, Poland
- Knurów, Poland
- Saint Pierre and Miquelon, French overseas collectivity, unofficial
- Sanma, province of Vanuatu
- Shefa, province of Vanuatu
- South Africa
- Mapuche
- South Sudan
- Torba, province of Vanuatu

=== White, gold, black, red, green, blue, grey ===
- Ngardmau, state of Palau

=== White, gold, black, red, green ===
- Dominica (with multicolored emblem)
- Guyana
- Jain flag (with distinct yellow and orange)
- Mozambique
- Pattani (with white symbol and no yellow)
- Saint Kitts and Nevis
- Santander, Colombia
- Táchira State, Venezuela
- Zimbabwe
- Zimbabwe Rhodesia (1979)

=== White, gold, black, red, green, brown ===
- Osun State, Nigeria

=== White, gold, black, green ===
- Afghanistan (1992–1996)
- Amazonas, Colombia
- Chorzele, Poland
- Guadalcanal, province of Solomon Islands (with two shades of green)
- Orellana Province, Ecuador
- Schijndel, Netherlands

=== White, gold, black, green, blue, brown ===
- Delta Amacuro State, Venezuela
- Kayangel, state of Palau

=== White, gold, black, green, brown ===
- Ngatpang, state of Palau

=== White, gold, black, green, murrey ===
- North Central Province, Sri Lanka – with other color symbol

=== White, gold, black, blue ===
- Finistère, France
- Myszków, Poland
- Pittsburgh, Pennsylvania, United States
- Republic of Maryland (1854–1857)
- Saint Lucia
- Zulia State, Venezuela

=== White, gold, black, blue, murrey ===
- Salta, Argentina

=== White, gold, red ===
- Alsace, France
- Apeldoorn, Netherlands
- Aude, France
- Barcelona, Spain
- Benevento, Campania, Italy
- Białystok, Poland (with multicolored coat of arms)
- Bielsko-Biała, Poland (with multicolored coat of arms)
- Carinthia, Austria
- Columbus, Ohio, United States (with multicolored seal)
- Free City of Danzig (1920–1939)
- Dorset, England, United Kingdom
- Elba, 1814–1815, used during Napoleon Bonaparte's imprisonment
- Essex, England, United Kingdom
- Commune of the Working People of Estonia (1918–1919)
- Gard, France
- Gdańsk, Poland
- Greater Poland Voivodeship, Poland
- Grudziądz, Poland
- Guernsey (British crown dependency)
- Haarlem, Netherlands
- Haute-Garonne, France
- Hérault, France
- Inowrocław, Poland
- Isle of Man (British crown dependency)
- Jelenia Góra, Poland (with multicolored coat of arms)
- Jersey (British crown dependency)
- Lesser Poland Voivodeship, Poland
- Limburg, Belgium
- Lincoln, England, United Kingdom
- Lorraine, former administrative region of France
- Lot-et-Garonne, France
- Lublin Voivodeship, Poland
- Masovian Voivodeship, Poland
- Middlesex, England, United Kingdom
- North Ossetia-Alania, Russia
- Odesa, Ukraine
- Proszowice, Poland
- Provence-Alpes-Côte d'Azur, a French region
- Saint Petersburg, Russia
- San Diego, United States (with multicolored seal)
- Santa Barbara, California, United States
- Sark, one of the British Channel Islands
- Seine-Maritime, France (with other color symbol)
- Selangor, Malaysia
- Sikkim (1967–1975)
- South Ossetia (de facto state, limited recognition)
- Świebodzin, Poland
- Sułkowice, Poland (with multicolored coat of arms)
- Warmian–Masurian Voivodeship, Poland
- Westmorland, England, United Kingdom
- Wolin, Poland
- York, England, United Kingdom

=== White, gold, red, green ===
- Alderney, one of the British Channel Islands
- Barretos, São Paulo, Brazil
- Byelorussian SSR, Soviet Union (1951–1991)
- Chechnya, Russia
- East Indonesia (1946–1950)
- Kurdistan, Iraq
- Lara State, Venezuela
- Liège Province, Belgium
- Lithuanian SSR, Soviet Union (1953–1988)
- Lubusz Voivodeship, Poland
- Myanmar
- New Granada (1811–1814)
- Prince Edward Island, Canada
- La Rioja, Spain (with multicolored coat of arms)
- Shan State, Myanmar
- Suriname
- Tajik SSR, Soviet Union (1953–1992)
- Tajikistan
- Thurgau, Switzerland
- Togo
- Turkmenistan
- Vosges, France

=== White, gold, red, green, blue ===
- Empire of Brazil (1821–1889), House of Braganza
- Cantal, France
- Central African Republic
- Comoros
- Green Ensign
- Jabal ad-Druze, French Mandate for Syria and Lebanon (1921–1936)
- Karachay-Cherkessia, Russia
- Karakalpakstan, Uzbekistan
- Khakassia, Russia
- Misiones Department, Paraguay – with other color symbol
- Namibia
- Northern Province, Sri Lanka
- Ontario, Canada
- Pembrokeshire, Wales, United Kingdom
- Pernambuco, Brazil
- Qing Dynasty
- Rio Grande do Sul, Brazil
- Roraima, Brazil
- Seychelles
- Sikkim (1877–1914 and 1962–1967)
- Sikkim (1914–1962)
- Sint Eustatius, Caribbean Netherlands
- South West Ethiopia Peoples' Region, Ethiopia
- Tampa, Florida, United States
- Vaucluse, France
- United States Virgin Islands (US insular area)

=== White, gold, red, green, blue, purple ===
- Jewish Autonomous Oblast, Russian Far East, Russia (with distinct yellow and orange)
- Wiphala (with distinct yellow and orange)

=== White, gold, red, green, blue, brown ===
- British Hong Kong (1841–1997)

=== White, gold, red, green, brown ===
- Turbaco, municipality in Bolívar, Colombia

=== White, gold, red, blue ===
- Acadia, Ethno-Linguistic region of the Northeastern United States and Southeastern Canada.
- Acadiana, Louisiana, United States
- Alawite State, French Mandate for Syria and Lebanon (1920–1936)
- Almere, Netherlands (with other color symbol)
- Alpes-de-Haute-Provence, France
- Anglican Communion
- Antwerp Province, Belgium
- Ardennes, France
- Ariège, France
- Republic of Artsakh (1992–2023, de facto separatist state, not recognized by UN)
- Aruba, Kingdom of the Netherlands
- ASEAN, the Association of Southeast Asian Nations
- Bitola, North Macedonia
- British Columbia, Canada
- Bruges, Belgium
- Buddhist flag (with distinct yellow and orange)
- Cape Verde
- Castilla-La Mancha, Spain
- Catamarca Province, Argentina (with multicolored emblem)
- Charente, France
- Cher, France
- Córdoba Province, Argentina
- Colorado, United States (1911–1964)
- Colorado, United States
- Côte-d'Or, France
- Creuse, France
- Croatian Republic of Herzeg-Bosnia (unrecognised, 1991–1996)
- Denver, Colorado, United States
- Detroit, Michigan, United States
- Drôme, France
- Encarnación, Paraguay – with other color symbol
- Estelada, flag of the Catalan independence movement
- Estonian SSR, Soviet Union (1953–1990)
- Eure, France
- Eure-et-Loir, France
- Falcón State, Venezuela
- Gagauzia, Moldova
- Georgia, United States
- Gironde, France
- La Guaira State, Venezuela
- Haute-Loire, France
- Hertfordshire, England, United Kingdom (a brownish red)
- Indre, France
- Indre-et-Loire, France
- Jura, France
- Kirghiz SSR, Soviet Union (1952–1992)
- Kiribati
- Krosno, Poland
- Lafayette, Indiana, United States
- Latvian SSR, Soviet Union (1953–1990)
- Leeuwarden, Netherlands
- Limburg, Netherlands
- Loja, Ecuador
- Lyon, France
- Madeira (Portuguese autonomous region)
- Malaya (1948–1963)
- Malaysia
- Mayotte, French overseas department, unofficial
- Mecklenburg-Vorpommern, Germany
- Melaka, Malaysia
- Mengjiang (1939–1945)
- Mississippi, United States
- Napo, Ecuador
- Newfoundland and Labrador, Canada
- New South Wales, Australia
- Niue
- North Carolina, United States
- North Karelia, Finland
- Nova Scotia, Canada
- Orange Free State (1857–1902)
- Orne, France (with black outlines)
- Oxfordshire, England, United Kingdom
- Philippines
- Podlaskie Voivodeship, Poland
- Radzionków, Poland
- Rostov Oblast, Russia
- Saba, Caribbean Netherlands
- St. Louis, Missouri, United States
- Santiago del Estero Province, Argentina
- Saône-et-Loire, France
- Sarthe, France
- Seine-Saint-Denis, France
- Serbian Orthodox Church
- Serock, Poland
- Sievierodonetsk, Ukraine (Russian occupied territory)
- Sioux Falls, South Dakota, United States
- South Bend, Indiana, United States
- Union Jack of Sweden and Norway, used by Swedish and Norwegian warships, 1844–1905
- Świętokrzyskie Voivodeship, Poland
- Sydney, New South Wales, Australia
- Tarn-et-Garonne, France (with other color symbol)
- Tibet, China – with other color symbol
- Tuvalu – two different shades of blue
- Royal Standard of the United Kingdom
- Uzbek SSR, Soviet Union (1953–1991)
- Ust-Orda Buryat Okrug, Russia (1997–2007)
- Venezuela
- Vojvodina, Serbia
- Yaracuy State, Venezuela (with multicolored emblem)
- Yonne, France
- Zeeland, Netherlands (with multicolored seal)
- Żory, Poland

=== White, gold, red, purple ===
- Balearic Islands, Spain
- Castile and León, Spain

=== White, gold, green ===
- African Union
- Akwa Ibom State, Nigeria
- Azad Kashmir, Pakistan
- Bocas del Toro, Panama (with black and white text)
- Caqueta, Colombia
- Coral Gables, Florida, United States
- Cyprus
- Distrito Federal, Brazil
- East Sumatra (1947–1950)
- Ehime Prefecture, Japan
- Huila, Colombia
- India (with blue emblem)
- Ireland
- Ivory Coast
- Macau (Chinese special administrative region)
- Miami, Florida, United States
- Niger
- Nová Ves u Jarošova, Pardubice Region, Czechia
- Panama Oeste, Panama
- Starry Plough
- Sucumbios, Ecuador
- Vaud, Switzerland
- Wiltshire, England, United Kingdom
- Zamora Chinchipe, Ecuador
- Zielona Góra, Poland

=== White, gold, green, blue ===
- Amapá, Brazil
- Andorra la Vella, Andorra
- Apure, Venezuela (with multicolored emblem)
- Bashkortostan, Russia
- Bolívar State, Venezuela (with multicolored emblem)
- Brazil
- Ceará, Brazil
- Chaco Province, Argentina (with multicolored emblems)
- Christmas Island (Australian external territory)
- Connecticut, United States – with other color symbol
- Derbyshire, England, United Kingdom
- Duluth, Minnesota, United States
- Flevoland, Netherlands
- Formosa Province, Argentina
- Fortaleza, Ceará, Brazil
- Goiás, Brazil
- Guárico State, Venezuela (with two multicolored emblems)
- Janská Janská, Ústí nad Labem Region, Czechia
- Mato Grosso, Brazil
- Mato Grosso do Sul, Brazil
- Nairobi, Kenya
- Nairobi City County, Kenya (with tan symbols)
- National Renewal Alliance (1964–1985), extinct political party of Brazil
- Nueva Esparta State, Venezuela
- Piauí, Brazil
- Portland, Oregon, United States
- Portuguesa State, Venezuela
- Rio Grande do Norte, Brazil
- Rondônia, Brazil
- Sergipe, Brazil
- Solomon Islands
- Yorkshire, England, United Kingdom

=== White, gold, green, murrey ===
- Western Province, Sri Lanka

=== White, gold, green, tan ===
- North Western Province, Sri Lanka

=== White, gold, blue ===
- Aisne, France
- Albany, New York, United States (with multicolored seal)
- Dolphin Flag, used by the unrecognized Republic of Anguilla (1967–1969)
- Aube, France
- Australian Capital Territory, Australia
- Azores (Portuguese autonomous region) (with multicolored coat of arms)
- Banffshire, Scottish county
- Białobrzegi, Poland
- Bir Tawil
- Bosnia and Herzegovina
- Brisbane, Queensland, Australia
- Buryatia, Russia
- Canary Islands, Spain
- Chubut Province, Argentina
- Colón, Panama (with multicolored coat of arms)
- Curaçao, Kingdom of the Netherlands
- Częstochowa, Poland
- Delaware, United States – with other color symbol
- Essonne, France
- Euclid, Ohio
- Haute-Marne, France
- Jerusalem
- Kalmykia, Russia
- Kosovo
- Lelystad, Netherlands
- Loir-et-Cher, France
- Loiret, France
- Long Beach, California, United States (with multicolored seal)
- Lord Howe Island, New South Wales, Australia, unofficial
- Mariupol, Ukraine (Donetsk People's Republic)
- Magallanes, Chile
- Marne, France
- Marshall Islands
- Merionethshire, Wales, United Kingdom
- "The People's Flag" of Milwaukee
- Nashville, Tennessee, United States
- Nauru
- New Hampshire, United States
- New York City, United States
- Ngeremlengui, state of Palau
- Nowa Sól, Poland (with multicolored coat of arms)
- Pacatuba, Ceará, Brazil
- Penang, Malaysia (with multicolored emblem)
- Prince's Flag (historical flag of the Netherlands)
- Reda, Poland
- Rhode Island, United States
- Isles of Scilly, United Kingdom
- Seine-et-Marne, France
- Shizuoka Prefecture, Japan
- South Africa (with multicolored emblem), 1928–1994
- Thessaloniki, Central Macedonia, Greece
- Tierra del Fuego, Argentina
- Tocantins, Brazil
- Tokelau (New Zealand territory)
- Tuva, Russia
- Uruguay
- Uusimaa, Finland
- Val-de-Marne, France
- West Indies Federation (1958–1962)
- Yvelines, France

=== White, gold, blue, tan ===
- Ciechanów, Poland
- Eastern Province, Sri Lanka
- Santa Cruz Province, Argentina

=== White, gold, blue, grey ===
- Brussels, Belgium

=== White, gold, purple ===
- Kyoto Prefecture, Japan
- Yamanashi Prefecture, Japan

=== White, gold, brown, grey ===
- Royal Banner of the Kingdom of Kakongo (c.1883)

=== White, gold, murrey ===
- Hernandarias, Paraguay (with multicolored coat of arms)

=== White, gold, murrey, tan ===
- Central Province, Sri Lanka

=== White, black ===
- Basel-Stadt, Switzerland
- Brittany, France
- Historical flag of Brittany
- Ceuta, Spain (with multicolored coat of arms)
- Come and take it, from the Battle of Gonzales during the Texas Revolution
- Cornwall, England, United Kingdom
- Corsica, France
- Cyrenaica, Libya
- Delft, Netherlands
- Diagolon, Canadian far-right extremist group
- Enugu State, Nigeria
- Fribourg, Switzerland
- Ghent, Belgium (with multicolored emblem)
- Hohenzollern-Hechingen (to 1850) – with multicolored coat of arms
- Hohenzollern-Sigmaringen (to 1850) – with multicolored coat of arms
- ISIS, Terrorist organisation
- Johor Sultanate (1528–1855)
- Metz, France
- Pahang, Malaysia
- Prussia, Germany (1892–1918) – with multicolored coat of arms
- Prussia, Germany (1918–1947) – with multicolored coat of arms
- Prussia, Germany (civil flag, 1701–1947)
- Schutzstaffel
- Silver Fern Flag, unofficial flag of New Zealand
- Straight flag
- Terengganu, Malaysia
- Teutonic Order, former crusader state
- Tokugawa Shogunate
- Ulm, Germany

=== White, black, red ===
- Emirate of Afghanistan (1929)
- Amsterdam, Netherlands
- Appenzell Ausserrhoden, Switzerland
- Appenzell Innerrhoden, Switzerland
- Belarusian People's Republic (in exile, 1919–1925)
- Berlin, Germany
- Central Finland
- Charleroi, Belgium (with gold on coat of arms)
- Confederación Nacional del Trabajo, Spain
- Drenthe, Netherlands
- Durham, England, United Kingdom
- Flintshire, Wales, United Kingdom
- Germany (1867–1918)
- Germany (1935–1945)
- Kagoshima Prefecture, Japan
- Kuyavian-Pomeranian Voivodeship, Poland
- La Masó, Spain
- Limousin, France
- Tino rangatiratanga (Māori flag)
- Minas Gerais, Brazil
- Northern Territory, Australia (with ochre-red)
- Oromia Region, Ethiopia (with multicolored emblem)
- Paraíba, Brazil
- Peel en Maas, Netherlands
- Puigpelat, Spain
- Republic of the Rio Grande, now used by the city of Laredo, Texas, United States
- Roman Republic (1798–1799)
- Salm (1802–1811)
- Sandinista National Liberation Front
- Sardinia, Italy
- Sealand (micronation)
- Trinidad and Tobago
- Udmurtia, Russia
- Upper Volta (1959–1984)
- Yemen

=== White, black, red, blue ===
- Bikini Atoll
- Haute-Vienne, France
- Knoxville, Tennessee, United States (with multicolored symbol)
- Republic of Korea
- Lockwood Silver Fern flag, proposed alternative flag of New Zealand
- Maranhão, Brazil
- Republic of Matabeleland
- Red Peak flag, proposed alternative flag of New Zealand
- San Antonio, Texas, United States
- United Tribes flag, New Zealand
- South Yemen (1967–1990)

=== White, black, red, green ===
- Arab Revolt, 1916–1918 revolt against the Ottoman Empire
- Bangladesh naval Ensign (with combined national flag and white background)
- Dąbrowa Górnicza, Poland
- Gambela Region, Ethiopia
- Ghana (1964–1966)
- Goshen (1883–1885, unrecognized)
- Iraq
- Iraq (1924–1959)
- Jordan
- Kenya
- Kuwait
- Libya
- Malawi (2010–2012)
- Ngobe-Bugle, Panama
- Ożarów Mazowiecki, Poland
- Palestine
- Sahrawi Arab Democratic Republic
- Santo Domingo, Ecuador – with other color symbol
- Somaliland
- Sudan
- Syria (1963–1972)
- Syrian Arab Republic (1980–2024)
- Syria (1930–1958, 1961–1963, since 2024)
- United Arab Emirates
- United Arab Republic (1958–1971)
- Universal Negro Improvement Association and African Communities League
- Yemen Arab Republic (1962–1990)

=== White, black, red, grey ===
- Balvi, Latvia

=== White, black, green ===
- Devon, England, United Kingdom
- East Flanders, Belgium (with other color symbol)
- Extremadura, Spain – with other color symbol
- Jastrzębie-Zdrój, Poland
- Marche, Italy
- Nevřeň, Pilsen Region, Czechia
- Ngchesar, state of Palau
- Putumayo Department, Colombia

=== White, black, green, blue ===
- Aimeliik, state of Palau
- Lesotho
- Movement for the Self-Determination of Bioko Island, also known as the Bubi separationist movement
- Río Negro Province, Argentina
- Worcestershire, England, United Kingdom

=== White, black, blue ===
- Aargau, Switzerland
- Autonomous Republic of Northern Epirus (1914)
- Botswana
- Côtes-d'Armor, France
- Estonia
- Ille-et-Vilaine, France
- Loire-Atlantique, France
- Morbihan, France
- Neutral Moresnet
- North Province, New Caledonia
- Saar (1920–1935)
- South Ostrobothnia, Finland

=== White, black, murrey ===
- Democratic Republic of Georgia (1918–1921)
- Georgia (1991–2004)

=== White, red ===
- Abu Dhabi, United Arab Emirates
- Aceh Sultanate (1496–1903)
- Aichi Prefecture, Japan
- Ajman, United Arab Emirates
- Akita Prefecture, Japan
- Alabama, United States
- Alsace (Historical), France
- Amersfoort, Netherlands
- Antwerp, Belgium
- Árpád stripes, historical flag of House of Árpád
- Asunción, Paraguay – with other color symbol
- Atlántico, Colombia
- Austria
- Bahrain
- Bari, Italy
- Basel-Landschaft, Switzerland
- Bas-Rhin, France
- Belarus (1918, 1991–1995)
- Będzin, Poland (with multicolored coat of arms)
- Birmingham, Alabama, United States
- Brandenburg, Germany
- Brandywine flag, used during the American Revolution
- Bratislava, capital of Slovakia
- Bremen, Germany
- Breda, Netherlands
- Brno, Czechia
- Calgary, Canada
- California, United States (with multicolored emblem and text)
- Canada
- Cantabria, Spain (with multicolored coat of arms)
- Republic of Central Albania (1913–1914)
- Chlístovice, Central Bohemian Region, Czechia
- Chuquisaca Department, Bolivia
- City of London, England, United Kingdom
- Cross of Burgundy, historical flag of the Duchy of Burgundy and Spain
- Denmark
- District of Columbia, United States
- Dordrecht, Netherlands
- Drahobuz, Ústí nad Labem Region, Czechia
- Dubai, United Arab Emirates
- Džbánice, South Moravian Region, Czechia
- Easter Island, Chile
- Eindhoven, Netherlands
- Elbląg, Poland
- England, United Kingdom
- Florence, Italy
- Florida, United States – with other color symbol
- Franconia, Germany
- Frankfurt (to 1866) – with multicolored coat of arms
- French Polynesia, French overseas territory (with multicolored emblem)
- Fujairah, United Arab Emirates (to 1961)
- Fukushima Prefecture, Japan (orangish red)
- Genoa, Italy
- Georgia
- Gers, France
- Gibraltar (British overseas territory) – with other color symbol
- Glamorgan, Wales, United Kingdom
- Golden Horde
- Gouda, Netherlands
- Greenland (Danish autonomous country)
- Hamburg, Germany
- Hesse, Germany
- Hesse and by Rhine (Hesse-Darmstadt), Germany (to 1945)
- Hesse-Homburg (to 1866)
- Hesse-Kassel (to 1866)
- Hiroshima Prefecture, Japan
- Hong Kong (Chinese special administrative region)
- Hoorn, Netherlands
- Indonesia
- Saint Patrick's Saltire, historical flag of Ireland
- Japan
- Rising Sun Flag, used by the Japanese military
- Jura, Switzerland
- Kanagawa Prefecture, Japan
- Kelantan, Malaysia
- Kent, England, United Kingdom
- Kerkrade, Netherlands
- Kōchi Prefecture, Japan
- Koniecpol, Poland (with multicolored coat of arms)
- Kumamoto Prefecture, Japan
- Kingdom of Laos (1952–1975)
- Leiden, Netherlands
- Leuven, Belgium
- Lier, Belgium
- Lübeck, Germany (to 1937)
- Maastricht, Netherlands
- Madrid, Spain
- Malta – with other color symbol
- Malta (variant)
- Sovereign Military Hospitaller Order of Saint John of Jerusalem, of Rhodes and of Malta
- Mari El, Russia (with multicolored coat of arms)
- Melbourne, Victoria, Australia – with other color symbol
- Milan, Italy
- Monaco
- Mons, Belgium
- Montreal, Canada
- Nara Prefecture, Japan
- Nation of Islam
- Němčičky (Znojmo District), South Moravian Region, Czechia
- Nidwalden, Switzerland
- North Brabant, Netherlands
- Turkish Republic of Northern Cyprus (de facto state, limited recognition)
- Obwalden, Switzerland
- Ōita Prefecture, Japan
- Okinawa Prefecture, Japan
- Ostróda, Poland (with multicolored coat of arms)
- Ottoman Empire, also known as the Turkish Empire (1844–1922)
- Perth, Western Australia, Australia (with multicolored emblem)
- Peru
- Grand Duchy of Posen (1815–1848)
- Poland
- Potosí Department, Bolivia
- Rakhine State, Myanmar (with blue emblem)
- Ras al-Khaimah, United Arab Emirates
- Regensburg (1803–1810)
- Rijnsburg, Netherlands
- Saitama Prefecture, Japan
- Salzburg, Austria
- Savoy (1416–1792 & 1814–1860)
- Schwyz, Switzerland
- Sharjah, United Arab Emirates
- Singapore
- Sint-Lievens-Houtem, Belgium
- Słubice, Poland (with multicolored coat of arms)
- Słupsk, Poland (with multicolored coat of arms)
- Solothurn, Switzerland
- Strasbourg, France
- Switzerland
- Tarija, Bolivia
- Thuringia, Germany
- Tlaxcala, Mexico
- Tonga
- Tournai, Belgium
- Free Territory of Trieste (1947–1954)
- Tunisia
- Turkey
- Tyrol, Austria
- Umm al-Quwain, United Arab Emirates
- Upper Austria, Austria
- Utrecht (city), Netherlands
- Utrecht (province), Netherlands
- Valais, Switzerland
- Vendée, France
- Vienna, Austria
- Vorarlberg, Austria
- Warwickshire, England, United Kingdom
- West Pomeranian Voivodeship, Poland (with multicolored coat of arms)
- Workers' Party, political party of Brazil
- Mutawakkilite Kingdom of Yemen (1927–1962)

=== White, red, grey ===
- Coclé, Panama
- Pasir Puteh, Malaysia
- Wanze, Belgium

=== White, red, green ===
- Republic of Abkhazia (de facto state, limited recognition)
- Algeria
- Amambay Department, Paraguay – with other color symbol
- Anhalt, Germany (1863–1945)
- Areguá, Paraguay – with other color symbol
- Basque Country, Spain
- Belarus
- Federation of Bosnia and Herzegovina (with multicolored coat of arms), in use 1996–2007
- Boyacá Department, Colombia
- Bulgaria
- Burundi
- Campo Limpo Paulista, São Paulo, Brazil (with multicolored coat of arms)
- Central Bosnia Canton, Bosnia and Herzegovina
- Chiriquí Province, Panama
- Cisalpine Republic (1797–1802)
- Cispadane Republic (1796–1797)
- Gorzów Wielkopolski, Poland
- Harari Region, Ethiopia (with multicolored emblem)
- Houthi movement
- Hungary
- Ingushetia, Russia
- Iran
- Italy
- Kingdom of Italy (1861–1946) – with other color symbol
- Lebanon
- Lublin, Poland (with multicolored coat of arms)
- Madagascar
- Maldives
- Manabí Province, Ecuador
- Mexico – with multicolored emblem
- Neuchâtel, Switzerland
- New England, United States
- Newbury, Essex County, Massachusetts, United States
- North Rhine-Westphalia, Germany
- Nottinghamshire, England, United Kingdom
- Oman
- Oyo State, Nigeria
- Paraguarí Department, Paraguay – with other color symbol
- Posavina Canton, Bosnia and Herzegovina
- Saga Prefecture, Japan
- San Ignacio, Paraguay
- Santa Catarina, Brazil
- Seychelles (1977–1996)
- Tajik SSR, Soviet Union (1953–1991) (emblem is gold)
- Tajik SSR, Soviet Union (1991–1992)
- Tatarstan, Russia
- Trujillo State, Venezuela
- Wales, United Kingdom
- Yucatán, Mexico
- Zenica-Doboj Canton, Bosnia and Herzegovina

=== White, red, green, grey ===
- Aguadulce, Panama

=== White, red, blue ===
- Adjara, Georgia
- Alagoas, Brazil (with multicolored coat of arms)
- Amazonas, Brazil
- American Samoa, (US insular area) (with multicolor emblem)
- Anguilla (British overseas territory) – with other color symbol
- Arkansas, United States
- Ascension Island (part of the British overseas territory of Saint Helena, Ascension and Tristan da Cunha) – with other color symbol
- Assyrian flag – with other color symbol, two shades of blue or red (may or may not always be included)
- Australia
- Bahia, Brazil
- Bandera del Directorio Revolucionario Estudiantil
- Bali Kingdom (914–1908)
- Belize (with multicolored coat of arms)
- Bermuda (British overseas territory) – with other color symbol
- Bohol, Philippines
- Bouvet Island, Norwegian overseas territory (does not have a flag of its own)
- British Antarctic Territory (British overseas territory) – with other color symbol
- British Indian Ocean Territory (British overseas territory) – with other color symbol
- Bydgoszcz, Poland (with multicolored coat of arms)
- Cambodia
- Campania, Italy
- Caribbean Netherlands, or the BES islands, Dutch islands in the Caribbean (does not have a flag of its own)
- Carpathian Ruthenia
- Cayman Islands (British overseas territory) (with multicolored coat of arms)
- Central Department, Paraguay
- Chicago, Illinois, United States
- Chile
- Chile, 1817
- Republic of China (Taiwan and surrounding islands)
- Choctaw Republic, flag in use 1860–1866
- Christian flag
- Cincinnati, Ohio, United States
- Cleveland, Ohio, United States – with other color symbol
- Confederate States of America, 1861–1865, flag in use 1861–1863
- Confederate States of America, 1861–1865, flag in use 1863–1865
- Confederate States of America, 1861–1865, flag in use 1865
- Confederate States of America (battle flag, used by the Confederate military), 1861–1865
- Cook Islands
- Costa Rica
- Crimea (disputed between Ukraine and Russia)
- Croatia – with other color symbol
- Croats of Serbia
- Cuba
- Czech Republic
- Czechoslovakia (1920–1992)
- Dallas, Texas, United States – with other color symbol
- Des Moines, Iowa, United States
- Dominican Republic – with other color symbol
- Easton, Pennsylvania, United States
- Entre Ríos Province, Argentina
- Falkland Islands (British overseas territory) – with other color symbol
- Faroe Islands (Danish autonomous country)
- Fiji – with other color symbol; two different shades of blue
- France
- Presidential Standard of France
- French Southern and Antarctic Lands
- Friesland, Netherlands
- Georgia, naval ensign
- Merchant Flag of Germany (1946–1949), used during the Occupation Period to identify German ships according to international law.
- Kingdom of Great Britain (1707–1800)
- Kingdom of Slavonia
- (Kingdom of Yugoslavia) Kingdom of Serbs, Croats and Slovenes
- Hawaii, United States
- Heard Island and McDonald Islands, Australian external territory (does not have a flag of its own)
- Herefordshire, England, United Kingdom
- Hokkaido Prefecture, Japan
- Iceland
- Imo State, Nigeria
- Indaiatuba, São Paulo, Brazil
- Indianapolis, Indiana, United States
- Iowa, United States (with multicolored emblem)
- Johor, Malaysia
- Kansas City, Missouri, United States
- Kayin State, Myanmar
- Khmer Republic (1970–1975)
- Democratic People's Republic of Korea
- Laos
- La Rioja Province, Argentina – with other color symbol
- Legionowo, Poland (with multicolored coat of arms)
- Liberia
- Luxembourg
- Luxembourg (civil ensign)
- Luxembourg, Belgium
- M-19
- Magdalena Department, Colombia
- Manitoba, Canada – with other color symbol
- Mari El, Russia (2006–2011)
- Masuria, Poland
- Mataram Sultanate (1587–1755)
- Misiones Province, Argentina
- Mississippi, United States (1894–1996)
- Mississippi, United States (1996–2001)
- Mississippi, United States (2001–2020)
- Missouri, United States – with other color symbol
- Mobile, Alabama, United States – with other color symbol
- Montserrat (British overseas territory) – with other color symbol
- Mordovia, Russia
- Natal (British colony, 1870–1910) – with other color symbol
- Natalia Republic (1839–1843, unrecognized)
- Nepal
- The Netherlands
- Netherlands Antilles
- New Orleans, Louisiana, United States – with gold emblems
- New Zealand
- Ngarchelong, state of Palau
- Nivkh people
- North Dakota, United States
- Norway
- Nouvelle-Aquitaine, (aka New Aquitaine), France
- Ohio, United States
- Panama
- Pará, Brazil
- Paraguay – with other color symbol
- Patagonian Republican Party
- Pitcairn, Henderson, Ducie and Oeno Islands (British overseas territory) – with other color symbol
- Principality of Lucca and Piombino (1805–1809)
- Principality of Piombino
- Protectorate of Bohemia and Moravia (Partially-annexed German territory, 1939–1945)
- Puerto Rico (US insular area)
- Republika Srpska, Bosnia and Herzegovina
- Federation of Rhodesia and Nyasaland, British colony, 1953–1963 – with other color symbol
- Russia
- Revolutionary Directorate
- Rocha
- Saar (1947–1956)
- Sabah, Malaysia – three different shades of blue
- Saint Helena (part of the British overseas territory of Saint Helena, Ascension and Tristan da Cunha) – with other color symbol
- Saint Martin, French overseas collectivity (will have its own flag in December 2026)
- Samoa
- Samoan Kingdom (1872–1873)
- Samoan Kingdom (1873–1875)
- Samoan Kingdom (1875–1879)
- Santa Fe Province, Argentina – with other color symbol
- Schaumburg-Lippe, Germany (to 1946)
- Schleswig-Holstein, Germany
- Serbia – with other color symbol
- Serbia and Montenegro (1992–2006)
- Serbs of Croatia
- Seychelles (1976–1977)
- Sint Maarten, Kingdom of the Netherlands – with other color symbol
- Slovakia
- Slovenia – with other color symbol
- Sorbs
- Southern Nations, Nationalities, and Peoples' Region, Ethiopia (1995–2023) – with multicolored emblem
- South Georgia and the South Sandwich Islands (British overseas territory) – with other color symbol
- South Province, New Caledonia
- Springfield, Illinois, United States
- Svalbard and Jan Mayen, Norwegian islands in the Arctic (does not have a flag of its own)
- Tasmania, Australia
- Tennessee, United States
- Texas, United States
- Telavi, Georgia
- Thailand
- Toronto, Ontario, Canada
- Transvaal (British colony, 1903–1910) – with other color symbol
- Trenton, Georgia, United States
- Tristan da Cunha (part of the British overseas territory of Saint Helena, Ascension and Tristan da Cunha) – with other color symbol
- Turks and Caicos Islands (British overseas territory) – with other color symbol
- United Kingdom of Great Britain and Northern Ireland
- United States of America
- United States Minor Outlying Islands, isolated island territories of the United States (does not have a flag of its own)
- Artigas flag, one of the three official flags of Uruguay
- Flag of the Treinta y Tres, one of the three official flags of Uruguay (with black text)
- Utah, United States (with multicolored coat of arms)
- British Virgin Islands (British overseas territory) – with other color symbol
- Wallis and Futuna, French overseas territory, unofficial
- Republic of West Papua (1961–1962)
- Wichita, Kansas, United States
- Wyoming, United States
- Kingdom of Yugoslavia (1918–1946)
- Democratic Federal Yugoslavia (1943–1946)
- Socialist Federal Republic of Yugoslavia (1945–1992) – with gold outline
- Republic of Graaff-Reinet (with multicolored coat of arms)
- Republic of Swellendam (with multicolored coat of arms)
- Islands of Refreshment (with different aspect ratio)

=== White, red, green, blue ===
- Abruzzo, Italy – with other color symbol
- Afar Region, Ethiopia (with multicolored emblem)
- Alpes-Maritimes, France
- Azerbaijan
- Aztlán, unofficial flag of Chicano nationalism, with other color symbol
- Bayelsa State, Nigeria
- Central Ethiopia Regional State, Ethiopia
- Chin State, Myanmar (with multicolored emblem)
- Djibouti
- Equatorial Guinea – with other color symbol
- Federal Dependencies of Venezuela
- The Gambia
- Groningen (province), Netherlands
- Guanacaste, Costa Rica
- Herzegovina-Neretva Canton, Bosnia and Herzegovina – with other color symbol
- Imbabura Province, Ecuador
- Lesotho (1966–1987)
- Mérida, Venezuelan state
- Nieuwe Republiek (1884–1888, unrecognized)
- Ogaden, Ethiopia
- Sakha Republic, Russia
- Sidama Region, Ethiopia
- Somali Region, Ethiopia
- South African Republic (1852–1877, 1881–1902)
- Republic of South Maluku (1950–1963)
- State of Syria, French Mandate for Syria and Lebanon (1925–1930)
- Uzbekistan

=== White, blue ===
- Almelo, Netherlands
- Altai Republic, Russia
- Antarctic Treaty System
- Antarctica – Graham Bartram flag
- Antarctica – True South flag
- Argentina – with other color symbol
- Arlon, Belgium
- Arnhem, Netherlands
- Ashdod, Israel
- Assen, Netherlands
- Basilicata, Italy
- Bat Yam, Israel
- Bavaria, Germany
- Bavaria, Germany
- Billings, Montana, United States (with multicolored emblem)
- Bonnie Blue Flag, unofficial flag of the Confederate States of America
- Brescia, Italy
- Buffalo, New York, United States (with multicolored emblem)
- Central America, 1823–1824 (with multicolored coat of arms)
- Central America, 1824–1839 (with multicolored coat of arms)
- Ciskei, nominally independent homeland (Bantustan), 1981–1994 (with black emblem)
- Chiba Prefecture, Japan (with gold on symbol)
- Chuuk, Federated States of Micronesia
- Colorado Springs, Colorado, United States (with multicolored emblem)
- Corrientes Province, Argentina (with black text and multicolored coat of arms)
- Cross River State, Nigeria
- Czeladź, Poland (with multicolored coat of arms)
- East Turkestan Liberation Organization/East Turkistan Republic
- Dalfsen, Netherlands
- Ecuador (1845–1860)
- El Salvador – with other color symbol
- Finland
- Fort Wayne, Indiana, United States (with red symbols)
- Fukui Prefecture, Japan
- Fukuoka Prefecture, Japan
- Galicia, Spain – with other color symbol
- Gazankulu (1971–1994)
- Gdynia, Poland (with multicolored coat of arms)
- Gelendzhik, Russia
- Greece
- Goryachy Klyuch, Russia
- Guanabara (1960–1975), Brazil (with multicolored coat of arms)
- Guatemala (with multicolored emblem)
- Guayas Province, Ecuador
- Hatohobei, state of Palau
- Holon, Israel
- Hoogeveen, Netherlands
- Honduras (1949–2022)
- Honduras
- Houston, Texas, United States (with multicolored seal)
- Hyōgo Prefecture, Japan
- International Flag of Planet Earth
- Ibaraki Prefecture, Japan
- Ishikawa Prefecture, Japan
- Israel
- Iwate Prefecture, Japan
- Kentucky, United States
- Kłobuck, Poland (with multicolored coat of arms)
- Korean Unification Flag, used when South Korean and North Korean athletes compete on a shared team
- Kosrae, Federated States of Micronesia
- Koszalin, Poland
- Kraków, Poland
- La Pampa Province, Argentina (with multicolored coat of arms)
- Legnica, Poland
- Leyen (1806–1813)
- Louisiana, United States – with other color symbol
- Lucerne, Switzerland
- Luxembourg City, Luxembourg – with other color symbol
- Madison, Wisconsin, United States (with multicolored emblem)
- Martinique, French overseas department, unofficial
- Mendoza Province, Argentina – with other color symbol
- Federated States of Micronesia
- Minneapolis, Minnesota, United States
- Moultrie Flag, historical flag used during the American Revolution
- Nagasaki Prefecture, Japan
- Neuquén Province, Argentina – with other color symbol
- Nicaragua (with multicolored emblem)
- Northwest Territories, Canada (with multicolored coat of arms)
- Oklahoma, United States
- Osaka Prefecture, Japan
- Paraguay (1826–1842)
- Police County, Poland
- Province of Pomerania, Germany (1882–1935)
- Quebec, Canada
- Rio de Janeiro, Brazil (with multicolored coat of arms)
- Rivers State, Nigeria
- Rybnik, Poland (with multicolored coat of arms)
- Salt Lake City, Utah, United States
- San Andres y Providencia, Colombia
- San Juan Province, Argentina – with other color symbol
- San Marino – with other color symbol
- Santander, Cantabria, Spain – with other color symbol
- Schwarzburg-Rudolstadt, Germany (to 1920)
- Schwarzburg-Sondershausen, Germany (to 1920)
- Scotland, United Kingdom
- Shetland, Scotland, United Kingdom
- Shiga Prefecture, Japan
- Slavonia, Croatia
- Somalia
- Sosnowiec, Poland
- South Carolina, United States
- The Starry Plough, used after the 1930s
- Sucre State, Venezuela (with multicolored emblem)
- Syracuse, New York, United States (with multicolored seal)
- Tenerife, Spain
- Kingdom of Tlemcen (1338–1488)
- Toruń, Poland (with multicolored coat of arms)
- Tottori Prefecture, Japan
- Trust Territory of the Pacific Islands (1965–1986)
- Tucumán Province, Argentina
- United Nations
- Veraguas, Panama
- Virginia, United States – with other color symbol
- VII Corps HQ Flag
- Wakayama Prefecture, Japan
- West Virginia, United States
- Western Pomerania
- Westphalia (1807–1813)
- White-blue-white flag, used by Russian anti-war protestors
- Wisconsin, United States
- Yamagata Prefecture, Japan
- Yap, Federated States of Micronesia
- Zug, Switzerland
- Zurich, Switzerland
- Zwolle, Netherlands

=== White, green, blue ===
- Kingdom of Araucanía and Patagonia (1860–1862)
- Barinas State, Venezuela (with multicolored emblem)
- Blachownia, Poland
- Córdoba Department, Colombia
- Cumberland, England, United Kingdom
- Doug flag, Cascadian bioregion (unofficial)
- Duluth, Minnesota, United States (1979–2019)
- Galapagos, Ecuador
- Gloucestershire, England, United Kingdom (a cream white)
- Guaviare Department, Colombia (with multicolored coat of arms)
- Republic of Jamtland (with black seal)
- Kabardino-Balkaria, Russia
- Kachin State, Myanmar
- Kępno, Poland
- Khabarovsk Krai, Russia
- Komi, Russia
- Konstancin-Jeziorna, Poland (with multicolored coat of arms)
- Ovamboland (1973–1989)
- Republic of Molossia (unrecognized micronation)
- Labrador, Canada (unofficial)
- Limón, province of Costa Rica
- Los Lagos Region, Chile
- Mountainous Republic of the Northern Caucasus (1917–1922)
- Confederation of Mountain Peoples of the Caucasus (1989–2000)
- New York City Police Department
- Nunatsiavut, Canada
- Paraná, Brazil
- San Pedro Department, Paraguay – with other color symbol'
- Sierra Leone
- Metropolitan Toronto, Ontario, Canada (1954–1997)
- Yukon, Canada (with multicolored coat of arms)

=== White, green ===
- Andalusia, Spain – with other color symbol
- Anhalt-Bernburg (to 1863)
- Anhalt-Dessau (to 1863)
- Anhalt-Köthen (to 1853)
- Antioquia, Colombia
- Aomori Prefecture, Japan
- Bangkok, Thailand
- Caaguazú, Paraguay
- Cesar Department, Colombia
- Coburg, Germany (1918–1920)
- Comoros (1978–1992)
- Comoros (1992–1996)
- Comoros (1996–2001)
- East Java (1948–1950)
- Egypt (1922–1958)
- Esmeraldas Province, Ecuador
- Esperanto flag
- Esquintla, Guatemala (with multicolored seal)
- Gifu Prefecture, Japan
- Groningen (city), Netherlands
- Hamas Resistance Group, Gaza Strip
- Hasselt, Belgium
- Jaworzno, Poland
- Kanepi Parish, Estonia
- Kagawa Prefecture, Japan
- Kirkcudbrightshire, Scotland, United Kingdom
- La Guajira, Colombia
- Lombardy, Italy
- Los Ríos Province, Ecuador
- Madura (1948–1950)
- Meta, Colombia
- Mie Prefecture, Japan
- Miyagi Prefecture, Japan
- Nigeria
- Norfolk Island (Australian external territory)
- Ottoman Tripolitania, eyalet of Ottoman Empire
- Pakistan
- Pando Department, Bolivia
- Pasundan (1948–1950)
- Pine Tree Flag, historical flag used during the American Revolution
- Rhodesia (1968–1979) – with other color symbol
- Ridderkerk, Netherlands
- Risaralda Department, Colombia
- Rotterdam, Netherlands
- St. Gallen, Switzerland
- Santa Cruz Department (Bolivia), Bolivia
- Saudi Arabia
- Saxe-Altenburg, Germany (1826–1920)
- Saxe-Coburg and Gotha, Germany (1826–1911)
- Saxe-Coburg and Gotha, Germany (1911–1918)
- Saxe-Gotha, Germany (1918–1920)
- Saxe-Hildburghausen (to 1826)
- Saxe-Meiningen, Germany (to 1920)
- Saxony, Germany
- Siberia, Russia
- Stellaland (1883–1885, de facto state, limited recognition)
- Styria, Austria
- Sucre, Colombia (with multicolored coat of arms)
- Tochigi Prefecture, Japan
- Togo (1956–1960)
- Tokyo, Japan (Symbol flag)
- Toyama Prefecture, Japan
- Vaupés Department, Colombia – two different shades of green
- Vlieland, Netherlands
- Wavre, Belgium

=== White, green, blue, tan ===
- Lesotho (1987–2006)
- Pohnpei, Federated States of Micronesia

=== White, green, purple ===
- Adjuntas, Puerto Rico

=== White, green, pink ===
- Flag of Newfoundland (Unofficial)

=== White, green, tan ===
- Alto Paraná Department, Paraguay
- Transkei, nominally independent homeland (Bantustan), 1976–1994

=== White, blue, grey ===
- Northern Mariana Islands (US insular area) – with other color symbol
- Northern Mariana Islands (US insular area), 1976–1981
- Valle del Cauca, Colombia

=== White, blue, murrey ===
- Sonsorol, state of Palau

=== White, purple ===
- Bueng Kan Province, Thailand (with multicolored seal)
- Gunma Prefecture, Japan
- Tokyo, Japan

=== White, murrey ===
- Berg (1806–1808)
- Latvia
- Moscow, Russia – with other color symbol
- Ñemby, Paraguay – with other color symbol
- Qatar

=== White, tan ===
- Yamaguchi Prefecture, Japan
- The Kanem-Bornu Empire, according to Gabriel de Vallseca (1439)

=== White, pink ===
- Jalal-Abad, Kyrgyzstan

== Gold ==
- Anchorage, Alaska, United States (with multicolored seal)
- Aundh (1699–1948)
- Ayyubid dynasty (1171–1260)
- Baroda (?–1874)
- Basud, Camarines Norte
- Bruneian Sultanate (1368–1906)
- Bundi (1342–1949)
- Sultanate of Deli (1632–1946)
- Gwalior (1731–1818)
- Indore (1732–1818)
- Jhalawar (1838–1949)
- Jhansi (1728–1858)
- Karauli (1348–1948)
- Kolhapur (1710–1949)
- Kurundvad Junior (1733–1948)
- Maguindanao (1520–1905)
- Maratha Empire (1674–1818)
- Mysłowice, Poland (with multicolored coat of arms)
- New Jersey, United States (with multicolored coat of arms)
- Paracale, Camarines Norte
- Sangli (1782–1948)

=== Gold, black ===
- Anarcho-capitalist flag
- Austrian Empire
- Baden-Württemberg, Germany
- Baltimore, Maryland, United States (with other color emblem)
- Banjar Sultanate (1526–1860)
- Sultanate of Gowa (1300s–1945)
- Greek Orthodox Church
- Kashubia, Poland
- Lanfang Republic (1777–1884)
- Liberland (with multicolored coat of arms)
- Namur (city), Belgium
- National Capital District, Papua New Guinea
- Pittsburgh, Pennsylvania, United States (with multicolored emblem)
- Pomeranian Voivodeship, Poland
- Saint David, historical flag of Wales, United Kingdom
- Saxe-Gotha-Altenburg (to 1826)
- Saxe-Lauenburg, Germany (to 1876)
- Saxony-Anhalt, Germany
- Sikh flag
- Sneek, the Netherlands
- Tanzim Qaidat al-Jihad fi Bilad al-Rafidayn (with yellow text and seal)
- Workum, the Netherlands
- Refugee Nation (proposed flag)

=== Gold, black, red ===
- Angola
- Aboriginal Australians
- Belgium
- Bern, Switzerland
- Flanders, Belgium (with multicolored emblem)
- Geneva, Switzerland
- Germany
- German Democratic Republic (1959–1990)
- Guayama, Puerto Rico
- Hainaut, Belgium (with other color symbol)
- Lower Saxony, Germany (with white in coat of arms)
- Negeri Sembilan, Malaysia
- Norte de Santander, Colombia
- Pagaruyung Kingdom (1347–1833)
- Purmerend, North Holland, The Netherlands
- People's State of Reuss, Germany (1919–1920)
- Reuss-Gera (Junior Line), Germany (to 1919)
- Reuss-Greiz (Elder Line), Germany (to 1919)
- Reuss-Lobenstein (to 1820)
- Rhineland-Palatinate, Germany (with white in coat of arms)
- Saarland, Germany (with multicolored coat of arms)
- Sarawak, Malaysia
- Raj of Sarawak
- Schaffhausen, Switzerland
- Uri, Switzerland
- Waldeck, Germany (1921–1929)
- Waldeck and Pyrmont, Germany (to 1921)
- Walloon Brabant, Belgium
- Württemberg-Baden, West Germany (1945–1952)
- Würzburg, Germany

=== Gold, black, red, green ===
- Azawad, breakaway region from Mali
- Benishangul-Gumuz Region, Ethiopia
- Biafra (1967–1970, de facto state, limited recognition)
- Cape Verde (1975–1992)
- Ghana
- Guinea-Bissau
- Rwanda (1961–2001)
- São Tomé and Príncipe
- Vanuatu
- Zambia

=== Gold, black, red, green, blue ===
- Kanak flag, used in New Caledonia alongside the French flag
- South Ethiopia Regional State, Ethiopia – with other color symbol
- Tafea, province of Vanuatu

=== Gold, black, red, blue ===
- Germantown, Ohio, United States (with multicolored emblem)
- Peleliu, state of Palau
- Zgierz, Poland (with multicolored coat of arms)

=== Gold, black, green ===
- Cherokee Nation, United States (with distinct yellow and orange)
- Jamaica
- Saxe-Weimar-Eisenach, Germany (1813–1897)
- Saxe-Weimar-Eisenach, Germany (1897–1920)
- Sultanate of Siak Sri Indrapura (1723–1949)
- Tanganyika (1961–1964)

=== Gold, black, green, blue ===
- Guadeloupe, French overseas department, unofficial
- Saint Christopher-Nevis-Anguilla, British colony, 1882–1983, adopted in 1967
- Tanzania
- Zanzibar
- Malampa, province of Vanuatu

=== Gold, black, blue ===
- The Bahamas
- Barbados
- Territoire de Belfort, France
- Sultanate of Bulungan (1731–1964)
- Caithness, Scotland, United Kingdom (with multicolored emblem)
- Cojedes State, Venezuela
- Donetsk, Ukraine
- Donetsk Oblast, Ukraine
- El Paso, Texas (1948–1960)
- Gelderland, Netherlands
- Monmouthshire, Wales, United Kingdom
- Porto Velho, Rondônia, Brazil
- San Pedro de Ycuamandiyú, Paraguay – with other color symbol
- Shropshire, England, United Kingdom
- Wellington, New Zealand (with multicolored emblem)
- Zanzibar (January 1964)

=== Gold, black, blue, brown ===
- Koror, state of Palau

=== Gold, black, murrey ===
- Northamptonshire, England, United Kingdom
- Sabaragamuwa Province, Sri Lanka
- Southern Province, Sri Lanka

=== Gold, red ===
- Socialist Soviet Republic of Abkhazia (1925–1931)
- The Achaemenid Empire (The standard of Cyrus the Great) (550–330 BC)
- Alash Autonomy
- Albuquerque
- Amhara Region, Ethiopia
- Andrychów, Poland (with multicolored coat of arms)
- Anglesey, Wales, United Kingdom
- Aragon, Spain (with multicolored coat of arms)
- Aragua State, Venezuela (with multicolored coat of arms)
- Aramean-Syriac flag
- Armenian SSR, Soviet Union (1921–1922)
- Armenian SSR, TSFSR, Soviet Union (1922–1936)
- Armenian SSR, Soviet Union (1936–1940)
- Armenian SSR, Soviet Union (1940–1952)
- Aveyron, France
- Azerbaijan SSR, TSFSR, Soviet Union (1924–1927)
- Azerbaijan SSR, TSFSR, Soviet Union (1927–1931)
- Azerbaijan SSR, TSFSR, Soviet Union (1931–1937)
- Azerbaijan SSR, Soviet Union (1937–1940)
- Azerbaijan SSR, Soviet Union (1940–1952)
- Azuay, Ecuador
- Baden, Germany (to 1891)
- Baden, Germany (1891–1945)
- (South) Baden, West Germany (1945–1952)
- Bogotá, Colombia (with multicolored coat of arms)
- Burgenland, Austria
- Byelorussian SSR, Soviet Union (1919–1927)
- Byelorussian SSR, Soviet Union (1927–1937)
- Byelorussian SSR, Soviet Union (1937–1951)
- Byzantine Empire (Palaiologos dynasty, c. 1350)
- Senyera, flag of Catalonia (Spain), Northern Catalonia (France) and Alghero (Italy)
- People's Republic of China
- Chuvashia, Russia
- Dobczyce, Poland
- Dordogne, France
- Estonian SSR, Soviet Union (1940–1953)
- Georgian SSR, Soviet Union (1921–1922)
- Georgian SSR, Soviet Union (1922–1937)
- Georgian SSR, Soviet Union (1937–1951)
- Gmina Garbatka-Letnisko, Poland (with multicolored coat of arms)
- Gmina Gózd, Poland (with multicolored coat of arms)
- Hautes-Pyrénées, France (with other color symbol)
- Haut-Rhin, France
- Ilkhanate
- Jabal Shammar
- The Kalmar Union (1397–1523)
- Democratic Kampuchea (1976–1979)
- People's Republic of Kampuchea (1979–1989)
- Kazakh SSR, Soviet Union (1937–1940)
- Kazakh SSR, Soviet Union (1940–1953)
- Kirghiz SSR, Soviet Union (1936–1940)
- Kirghiz SSR, Soviet Union (1940–1952)
- Kyrgyzstan
- Latvian SSR, Soviet Union (1918–1920)
- Latvian SSR, Soviet Union (1940–1953)
- Liechtenstein (1719–1852)
- Liège, Belgium
- Lippe, Germany (1815–1880)
- Lippe, Germany (1880–1947)
- Lithuanian SSR, Soviet Union (1940–1953)
- Łódź, Poland
- Łódź Voivodeship, Poland
- Loire, France
- Lubin, Poland
- Middelburg, Netherlands
- Mohéli, Comoros autonomous island
- Moldavia
- Moldavian ASSR, Soviet Union (1937–1938)
- Moldavian ASSR, Soviet Union (1938–1940)
- Moldavian SSR, Soviet Union (1940–1952)
- Mon State, Myanmar
- Montenegro (with multicolor coat of arms)
- Naples, Italy
- New Mexico, United States
- Niigata Prefecture, Japan
- Republic of Macedonia (1992–1995)
- North Macedonia
- Normandy, France, Jersey, Guernsey
- Northumberland, England, United Kingdom
- Nowy Sącz County, Poland
- Occitania, historical region in southern Europe
- Ottoman Tunisia, eyalet of Ottoman Empire
- Pichincha Province, Ecuador
- Pirkanmaa, province of Finland
- Gmina Pionki, Poland (with multicolored coat of arms)
- Prague, Czechia
- Pretoria, South Africa
- Provence, a historical French province
- Pruszków, Poland
- Rembertów, Poland
- Republic of Rotuma (self-proclaimed republic within Fiji) (1987–1988)
- Rome, Italy
- Russian SFSR, Soviet Union (1918–1937)
- Russian SFSR, Soviet Union (1937–1954)
- Ryukyu Kingdom (merchant flag)
- Royal Banner of Scotland, United Kingdom
- Scania, Sweden
- Shimane Prefecture, Japan
- Sicily, Italy (with other color symbol)
- Gmina Sobolew, Poland (with multicolored coat of arms)
- Somerset, England, United Kingdom
- South Holland, Netherlands (with black outline)
- Spain – with other color symbol
- Staffordshire, England, United Kingdom
- Swedish-speaking Finns
- Taichung, Taiwan (1945–2025)
- Tajik SSR, Soviet Union (1931–1935)
- Tajik SSR, Soviet Union (1935–1936)
- Tajik SSR, Soviet Union (1936–1938)
- Tajik SSR, Soviet Union (1938–1940)
- Tajik SSR, Soviet Union (1940–1953)
- Tarn, France
- Tigray Region, Ethiopia
- Transcaucasian SFSR, Soviet Union (1922–1925)
- Transcaucasian SFSR, Soviet Union (1925–1936)
- Turkestan ASSR, RSFSR, Soviet Union (1918–1924)
- Turkmen SSR, Soviet Union (1926–1937)
- Turkmen SSR, Soviet Union (1937–1940)
- Turkmen SSR, Soviet Union (1940–1953)
- Tuvan People's Republic (1943–1944)
- Ukrainian SSR, Soviet Union (1919–1929)
- Ukrainian SSR, Soviet Union (1929–1937)
- Ukrainian SSR, Soviet Union (1937–1950)
- Union of Soviet Socialist Republics (1923–1924)
- Union of Soviet Socialist Republics (1924–1936)
- Union of Soviet Socialist Republics (1936–1955)
- Union of Soviet Socialist Republics (1955–1991)
- Uva Province, Sri Lanka
- Uzbek SSR, Soviet Union (1925–1927)
- Uzbek SSR, Soviet Union (1927–1929)
- Uzbek SSR, Soviet Union (1929–1931)
- Uzbek SSR, Soviet Union (1931–1934)
- Uzbek SSR, Soviet Union (1934–1935)
- Uzbek SSR, Soviet Union (1935–1937)
- Uzbek SSR, Soviet Union (1937–1938)
- Uzbek SSR, Soviet Union (1938–1941)
- Uzbek SSR, Soviet Union (1941–1952)
- Val d'Aran, administrative entity in Catalonia
- Vallmoll, Spain
- Vietnam
- Republic of Vietnam (1955–1975)
- Wallonia, Belgium
- Warsaw, Poland
- Wessex, England, United Kingdom
- Włocławek, Poland (with multicolored coat of arms)
- Wrocław, Poland
- Xinjiang Clique, China (1911–1944)

=== Gold, red, green ===
- Acre, Brazil
- Auvergne, France
- Bangladesh, flag used during the 1971–1972 Bangladesh Liberation War
- Benin
- Berkshire, England, United Kingdom (a brownish red)
- Bolívar Department, Colombia
- Bolivia
- Burkina Faso
- Cameroon
- Carchi, Ecuador
- Casanare Department, Colombia
- Republic of the Congo
- Ethiopia (1914–1996)
- French Guiana, French overseas department, unofficial
- Grenada
- Guinea
- Komárom, Hungary
- Lancashire, England, United Kingdom
- Sultanate of Langkat (1568–1946)
- Lithuania
- Los Angeles, California, United States (with multicolored seal)
- Mali
- Mauritania
- Moldavian SSR, Soviet Union (1952–1990)
- Navarre, Spain
- Puy-de-Dôme, France
- Movement for a Democratic Society (de facto symbol for Rojava)
- Regency of Algiers, Ottoman province
- Rwanda (1961)
- Rwanda (1961–2001)
- Saskatchewan, Canada
- Senegal
- Transnistria (de facto state, limited recognition)
- Zanzibar (December 1963 – January 1964)

=== Gold, red, green, blue ===
- Buenos Aires Province, Argentina
- Carabobo State, Venezuela (with black silhouette)
- Eritrea
- Ethiopia
- Hellendoorn, Netherlands
- Karelo-Finnish SSR, Soviet Union (1953–1956)
- Lincolnshire, England, United Kingdom
- Mauritius
- Pyrénées-Atlantiques, France (with black outlines)
- St. Petersburg, Florida

=== Gold, red, green, blue, purple ===
- Cusco, Peru (with distinct yellow and orange and two shades of blue)

=== Gold, red, green, tan ===
- Zaire (1971–1997)

=== Gold, red, blue ===
- Adelaide, South Australia (with multicolored emblems)
- Åland (Finnish autonomous territory)
- Allier, France
- Andorra – with other color symbol
- Arenberg (1803–1810)
- Arizona, United States – blue, red, gold and copper
- Armenia
- Armenian SSR, Soviet Union (1952–1990)
- Azerbaijan SSR, Soviet Union (1952–1991)
- Bouches-du-Rhône, France
- Calvados, France
- Cañar Province, Ecuador
- Chad
- Cieszyn, Poland
- Colombia
- Congo-Léopoldville (1963–1966)
- Congo-Kinshasa (1966–1971)
- Democratic Republic of the Congo
- Corrèze, France
- Cundinamarca Department, Colombia (with multicolored coat of arms)
- Ecuador (with multicolored coat of arms)
- Free State of Fiume (1920–1924)
- Gran Colombia (1821–1831)
- Great Dayak (1946–1950)
- Hautes-Alpes, France
- Kazakh SSR, Soviet Union (1953–1992)
- Landes, France
- Łomża, Poland
- Lozère, France
- Maine-et-Loire, France
- Manche, France
- Mecklenburg, Germany
- United Principalities of Moldavia and Wallachia (1859–1862)
- United Principalities of Romania (1862–1866)
- Moldova – with other color symbol
- Mongolia
- Montgomery County, Maryland, United States
- New Brunswick, Canada – with other color symbol
- Ngaraard, state of Palau
- Normandy, France
- North Holland, Netherlands
- Orkney, Scotland, United Kingdom
- Overijssel, Netherlands
- Pas-de-Calais, France (unofficial)
- Płock, Poland
- Réunion, French overseas department (unofficial)
- Romania
- Russian SFSR, Soviet Union (1954–1991)
- Skåne, Sweden
- Świętochłowice, Poland (with multicolored coat of arms)
- Turkmen SSR, Soviet Union (1952–1992)
- Ukrainian SSR, Soviet Union (1950–1991)
- Valencia, Spain – with other color symbol
- Var, France (unofficial)
- South Vietnam, 1975–1976
- Waalre, Netherlands
- West Flanders, Belgium
- Würzburg (1805–1814)
- Zabrze, Poland

=== Gold, red, blue, tan ===
- Tulsa, Oklahoma, United States

=== Gold, red, purple ===
- Córdoba, Spain (with multicolored emblem)
- Second Spanish Republic

=== Gold, green ===
- Aa en Hunze, Netherlands
- Adygea, Russia
- Ang Thong Province, Thailand (with multicolored seal and distinct yellow)
- Caacupé, Paraguay – with other color symbol
- Caernarfonshire, Wales, United Kingdom
- Caldas Department, Colombia
- Cauca Department, Colombia
- Kingdom of Cambodia (1340–1431)
- El Oro Province, Ecuador
- Figuerola del Camp, Spain
- Gombe State, Nigeria
- The Hague, Netherlands
- Hezbollah
- Huntingdonshire, England, United Kingdom
- Mangkunegaran (1757–1946)
- Mauritania (1959–2017)
- Miyazaki Prefecture, Japan
- Morona Santiago, Ecuador
- Nariño, Colombia
- Pakualaman
- Pastaza Province, Ecuador
- Pontianak Sultanate (1771–1950)
- Ramat HaSharon, Israel
- Rutland, England, United Kingdom
- Vallfogona de Ripollès, Spain
- Vichada Department, Colombia

=== Gold, green, blue ===
- Anzoátegui State, Venezuela (with black outline of the state)
- Bandung, Indonesia
- Bełchatów, Poland
- Chocó Department, Colombia
- Cumbria, England, United Kingdom
- Gabon
- Guainía Department, Colombia
- Bayan-Ölgii Province
- Ostrołęka, Poland
- Rwanda (with distinct yellow and gold)
- Saint Vincent and the Grenadines
- Siemianowice Śląskie, Poland
- Sudan (1956–1970)
- Tamazgha, Berber people
- Ustroń, Poland (with sun with a black outline from the coat of arms)

=== Gold, green, blue, tan ===
- Appalachia, United States cultural region, unofficial
- Venda, nominally independent homeland (Bantustan) (1979–1994)

=== Gold, green, blue, grey ===
- Medio San Juan, Colombia

=== Gold, green, purple ===
- Quindío, Colombia

=== Gold, green, murrey ===
- Sri Lanka (with distinct yellow and orange)

=== Gold, green, tan ===
- Cocos (Keeling) Islands (Australian external territory)
- The Starry Plough (1914–1930)

=== Gold, blue ===
- Alaska, United States
- Ardèche, France
- Asturias, Spain
- Bophuthatswana, nominally independent homeland (Bantustan), 1977–1994 (with white-and-black emblem)
- Brunswick, Germany (to 1946)
- Bytom, Poland (with multicolored coat of arms)
- Cambridgeshire, England, United Kingdom (two shades of blue)
- Cheshire, England, United Kingdom
- Congo Free State (1877–1908)
- Belgian Congo (1908–1960)
- Congo-Léopoldville (1960–1963)
- Democratic Republic of the Congo (1997–2003)
- Democratic Republic of the Congo (2003–2006)
- Dalmatia (1822–1918)
- County Durham, England, United Kingdom
- Doubs, France
- East Lothian (Haddingtonshire), Scotland, United Kingdom
- European Union
- Friuli–Venezia Giulia, Italy
- Gmina Opatowiec, Poland
- Hamilton, Ontario, Canada
- Heerlen, Netherlands
- Herrera Province, Panama
- Indiana, United States
- Isère, France
- Jalisco, Mexico (with multicolored coat of arms)
- Kansas, United States – with other color symbol
- Katowice, Poland (with multicolored coat of arms)
- Kazakhstan
- Kuźnia Raciborska, Poland (with multicolored coat of arms)
- Łaziska Górne, Poland (with multicolored coat of arms)
- Lower Austria, Austria
- Lubliniec, Poland (with multicolored coat of arms)
- Luque, Paraguay
- Macedonia, Greece (unofficial)
- Republic of Minerva (1972)
- Montana, United States
- Nassau (1806–1866)
- Nebraska, United States
- Opole Voivodeship, Poland
- Oregon, United States – reverse has same colors
- Otago, New Zealand
- Pabianice, Poland (with multicolored coat of arms)
- Palau
- Perlis, Malaysia
- Philadelphia, Pennsylvania, United States (with multicolored emblem)
- Piekary Śląskie, Poland
- Pszczyna, Poland (with multicolored coat of arms)
- Pszów, Poland (with multicolored coat of arms)
- Regina, Saskatchewan, Canada
- Ruda Śląska, Poland
- Saint Alban's Cross, flag of the Kingdom of Mercia
- Silesian Voivodeship, Poland
- Skoczów, Poland (with multicolored coat of arms)
- Sokoto State, Nigeria
- Sośnicowice, Poland (with multicolored coat of arms)
- Sousse, Tunisia
- South Dakota, United States
- Springfield, Massachusetts, United States (with multicolored emblem)
- Suffolk, England, United Kingdom
- Surrey, England, United Kingdom
- Sussex, England, United Kingdom
- Sweden
- Tilburg, Netherlands
- Tokushima Prefecture, Japan
- Ukraine
- Upper Silesia
- Vice Presidential Standard of Brazil

=== Gold, purple ===
- Amnat Charoen Province, Thailand (with multicolored seal)
- Buriram Province, Thailand (with multicolored seal and distinct orange)
- Campione d'Italia, Italy (with multicolored coat of arms)
- Okayama Prefecture, Japan
- Volapük

=== Gold, murrey ===
- Ceylon (1948–1951)
- Chachoengsao Province, Thailand (with multicolored seal)
- Region of Murcia, Spain
- Tolima Department, Colombia

=== Gold, pink ===
- Cantabrian labarum, used in Cantabria, Spain

== Black ==
- Black Flag
- Afghanistan (1901–1919)
- Afghanistan (1919–1921)
- Afghanistan (1921–1926)
- Afghanistan (1926–1928)
- Al-Qaeda, flag of Jihad (with white text)
- Ansaru (with multicolored emblem)
- Caucasus Emirate, Jihadist organisation in Russia (with white text)
- Islamic State of Iraq and the Levant (with white text and seal)
- Jama'at al-Tawhid wal-Jihad, flag used in late 2004 (with yellow and white text)
- Jolly Roger, is the traditional English name for the flags flown to identify a pirate ship preceding or during an attack, during the early 18th century.
- Nduma Defense of Congo-Renovated

=== Black, red ===
- Albania
- Civil ensign of Albania
- Anarcho-syndicalist flag
- Aosta Valley, Italy
- FET y de las JONS, the sole legal political party of Francoist Spain
- The colonial naval flag of the Duchy of Courland and Semigallia
- Haiti (1964–1986) – with multicolored coat of arms
- Namur Province, Belgium
- Nijmegen, Netherlands
- Ukrainian Insurgent Army
- Württemberg, Germany (to 1945)
- Württemberg-Hohenzollern, West Germany (1945–1952)

=== Black, red, green ===
- Afghanistan (2013–2021)
- Karelian Nationalist Flag
- Malawi
- Martinique (French overseas department)
- Pan-African flag
- Youth International Party (YIPPIES), American youth-oriented radical group

=== Black, red, blue ===
- Donetsk People's Republic, self-proclaimed state in Ukraine
- Kamienna Góra County, Poland
- East Frisia, Germany

=== Black, green, blue ===
- Zanzibar (January – April 1964)

=== Black, purple ===
- Anarcha-feminism

=== Black, grey ===
- Agorism

== Red ==
- Red flag
- Baton Rouge, Louisiana, United States (with white text and multicolored emblem)
- Biała, Poland (with multicolored coat of arms)
- Caracas, Venezuela (with multicolored coat of arms)
- Far Eastern Republic (1920–1922)
- Kedah, Malaysia (with multicolored coat of arms)
- Muscat and Oman (to 1970)
- Oruro Department, Bolivia
- Racibórz, Poland (with multicolored coat of arms)
- Soviet Union (1922–1991)
- Estonian Soviet Socialist Republic (ESSR) (1953–1990)
- Kazakh Soviet Socialist Republic (KSSR) (1953–1991)
- Kirghiz Soviet Socialist Republic (KSSR) (1952–1991)
- Latvian Soviet Socialist Republic (LSSR) (1953–1990)
- Lezgistani Separatist Movement
- Russian Soviet Federative Socialist Republic (RSFSR) (1954–1991)
- Sławków, Poland (with multicolored coat of arms)

=== Red, green ===
- Arauca Department, Colombia
- Bangladesh
- Bolívar Province, Ecuador
- Byelorussian Soviet Socialist Republic (BSSR) (1951–1991)
- Bukharan People's Soviet Republic (BPSR) (1920–1924)
- Khorezm People's Soviet Republic (KPSR) (1920–1924)
- People's Republic of Benin (1975–1990)
- Głogówek, Poland (with multicolored coat of arms)
- La Paz, Bolivia
- Lithuanian Soviet Socialist Republic (LSSR) (1953–1988)
- Morocco
- Moldavian Soviet Socialist Republic (MSSR) (1952–1990)
- Piaseczno, Poland
- Portugal (with multicolored coat of arms)
- Transnistria (state flag)
- Transnistria (civil flag)
- Tungurahua, Ecuador
- Zaporozhye Oblast (Occupied Ukrainian territory controlled by Russia)

=== Red, green, blue ===
- Amazonas State, Venezuela (with multicolored emblem)
- Dagestan, Russia
- Karelia, Russia
- Kayah State, Myanmar (with multicolored emblem)
- Romani people

=== Red, blue ===
- Chorzów, Poland
- Cotopaxi Province, Ecuador
- Georgian Soviet Socialist Republic (GSSR) (1951–1990)
- Gliwice, Poland (with multicolored coat of arms)
- Guam (US insular area) (with multicolored coat of emblem)
- Haiti (with multicolored coat of arms)
- Liechtenstein (with gold and black emblem)
- Province of Lugo, Spain (with multicolored coat of arms)
- Kingdom of Ndongo
- Nakhichevan Autonomous Soviet Socialist Republic (NASSR) (1956–1990)
- Oldenburg, Germany (to 1946)
- Paris, France (with multicolored coat of arms)
- Prudnik, Poland (with multicolored coat of arms)
- Szczecin, Poland (with multicolored coat of arms)
- Ticino, Switzerland
- Venlo, Limburg, the Netherlands (with multicolored coat of arms)
- Wodzisław Śląski, Poland (with multicolored coat of arms)
- Wojkowice, Poland

=== Red, tan ===
- Leszno, Poland

=== Red, grey ===
- Ottoman Empire, (1480–1780)
- Ottoman Empire, (1590–1646)

== Green ==
- Green Flag
- Adamawa State, Nigeria
- Beni Department, Bolivia
- Presidential standard of Brazil (with multicolored coat of arms)
- Hamas, Palestinian entity (with white text)
- Libya (1977–2011)
- Najran
- Wałbrzych, Poland (with multicolored coat of arms)
- Washington, United States – with other color symbol
- Zamfara State, Nigeria

=== Green, blue ===
- Chattanooga, Tennessee, United States (with multicolored emblem)
- Ełk, Poland (with multicolored coat of arms)
- Niuafo'ou
- Santa Elena Province, Ecuador – two different shades of blue (with multicolored coat of arms)

== Blue ==
- Australia
- Western Australia, Australia
- South Australia, Australia
- Queensland, Australia
- New South Wales, Australia
- (Victoria (state)) Victoria, Australia
- Tasmania, Australia
- Alberta, Canada (with multicolored shield of arms)
- Boston, Massachusetts, United States (with multicolored emblem)
- Cochabamba, Bolivia
- John McConnell's Earth Flag (with multicolored image)
- Idaho, United States (with multicolored seal)
- Lord Howe Island, external territory of Australia
- Maine, United States (with multicolored coat of arms)
- Melilla (with multicolored emblem)
- Michigan, United States (with multicolored coat of arms)
- Milwaukee, Wisconsin, United States (with multicolored emblems)
- Minnesota, United States
- Nevada, United States (with multicolored emblem)
- New York, United States (1901–2020)
- New York, United States (with multicolored coat of arms)
- (Campbell Island, New Zealand) New Zealand
- Northern Mariana Islands
- Pennsylvania, United States (with multicolored coat of arms)
- Surabaya, Indonesia (with multicolored coat of arms)
- Vermont, United States (with multicolored coat of arms)
- Bougainville, Papua New Guinea. Flag of the separatist movement of Bougainville.
- Camarines Sur, Philippines (with multicolored emblem)

=== Blue, grey ===
- Las Vegas, Nevada, United States (with multicolored emblem)

=== Blue, tan ===
- Kogi State, Nigeria
- Székely Land

== Grey ==
- Santiago Metropolitan Region, Chile (with multicolored seal)

== Pink ==
- Chai Nat Province, Thailand (with multicolored seal)

== See also ==
- List of flags
- List of flags by color
