= Flag of Poznań =

Poznań
- Use: Civil flag
- Proportion: 5:8
- Adopted: 1997
- Design: Coat of arms of the city on a white background

The flag of Poznań is a rectangular piece of white material with the coat of arms of the city placed in the middle. It was adopted in 1997.

The coat of arms of Poznań consists of white (not silver) city walls with three towers. On the left (heraldic) tower stands Saint Peter with a key and on the heraldic right one stands Saint Paul with a sword. In the gate there are two golden crossed keys with a cross above. Over the middle tower, which contains a single window and is topped by a battlement, there is a gothic shield with a white eagle in crown. On the sides of the two saints there are golden crescents and stars. All of those elements are on a blue field. Over the shield there is golden crown.

== See also ==
- Flag of Poland
- Coat of arms of Poland

== Sources ==
- Załącznik Nr 1 do Uchwały Nr LXXX/1202/V/2010 Rady Miasta Poznania z dnia 9 listopada 2010 r.
- (Załącznik Nr 1 do Statutu Miasta Poznania) Uchwała Nr X/50/IV/2003 Rady Miasta Poznania z dnia 18 lutego 2003 r. (Dz. Urz. Woj. Wielkopolskiego z 2003 r. Nr 54, poz. 1014)
- (Załącznik Nr 1 do Statutu Miasta Poznania) Uchwała Nr LVIII/415/II/97 Rady Miejskiej Poznania z dnia 27 maja 1997 r.
