= Flag of Fort Wayne, Indiana =

City of Fort Wayne
- Adopted: June 26, 1934
- Designed by: Guy Drewett
- Variant of the flag where the city's name and date are added to the flag.

The flag of Fort Wayne, Indiana was adopted as the city's official flag by City Council on June 26, 1934. The pall design includes two diagonal white stripes (from the bottom left and top left corners) converging in the circular center to form a horizontal white stripe. Red silhouettes of a Miami Native American head (center left), a French fleur-de-lis (top right), and a British lion (bottom right) grace a navy blue field. A red blockhouse is located at the center of the converging stripes. On some flag variants, the city's name and founding date are placed around the blockhouse, though this is uncommon.

== History ==
The first flag of Fort Wayne (1916–1934)

In commemoration of Indiana's centennial festivities in 1916, the Journal Gazette sponsored a contest to design a flag for the city of Fort Wayne. Guy Drewett's original winning design included the current white 'Y' stripes on a blue field, but also included two white stars. Each star was located where the fleur-de-lis and lion are on the current design.

Drewett redesigned the flag in 1934 under the guidance of veteran and historian Col. Clyde Dreisbach. The new design discarded the two white stars (symbolizing Fort Wayne's status as the state's second-largest city) for icons specific to its history. This current design was officially adopted by City Council on June 26, 1934.

A survey of flag design quality by the North American Vexillological Association ranked Fort Wayne's flag 52nd of 150 American city flags. It earned a score 4.62 out of 10.

== Symbolism ==
- Blockhouse: Symbolizes pioneer days of settlement
- Miami Indian head: Representing the Miami tribe (native inhabitants to the area)
- French fleur-de-lis: Represents former French control and influence on the area
- British lion: Represents former British control and influence on the area
- Three stripes: Symbolizing confluence of the three rivers in the city; Maumee River, St. Joseph River, and St. Marys River
- Colors: Red, white, and blue, identical to the colors represented on the flag of the United States
- 1794: Founding of Fort Wayne

The addition of the city name and date on the flag depends on the flag maker. The name and date are not listed in the flag design specifications, but if added, would not violate the flag code.

== Influence ==
Allen County, Indiana, the county that Fort Wayne is located in, held a flag redesign contest as part of a closing ceremony of its bicentennial anniversary. The contest lasted from January 1 through March 29, 2025. The contest received over 300 submissions. In October, 2025, residents of Allen County could vote on eight finalist flags. The winning flag, having received 41% of the vote, was made by Robert Borland, and it was directly inspired by the flag of Fort Wayne. The flag was adopted on April April 4, 2025.

The flag of Allen County, Indiana, which was designed to be similar to the flag of Fort Wayne.
