= Flag of Wrocław =

Wrocław
- Use: Civil flag
- Proportion: 5:8
- Adopted: 1938
- Design: A bicolor of red and yellow.
- Proportion: 5:8

The flag of Wrocław is formed by two horizontal bands of equal width — yellow on the bottom and red on the top. On the vertical banners, the red stripe is on the left, the yellow stripe on the right.

It was adopted originally in 1938.

Until 1938, the colors of Wrocław were red and white in the form of horizontal stripes: four (2 red + 2 white) or five (3 red + 2 white). Before 1938 the city flag with a coat of arms was also used.

== Gallery ==
Vertical flag

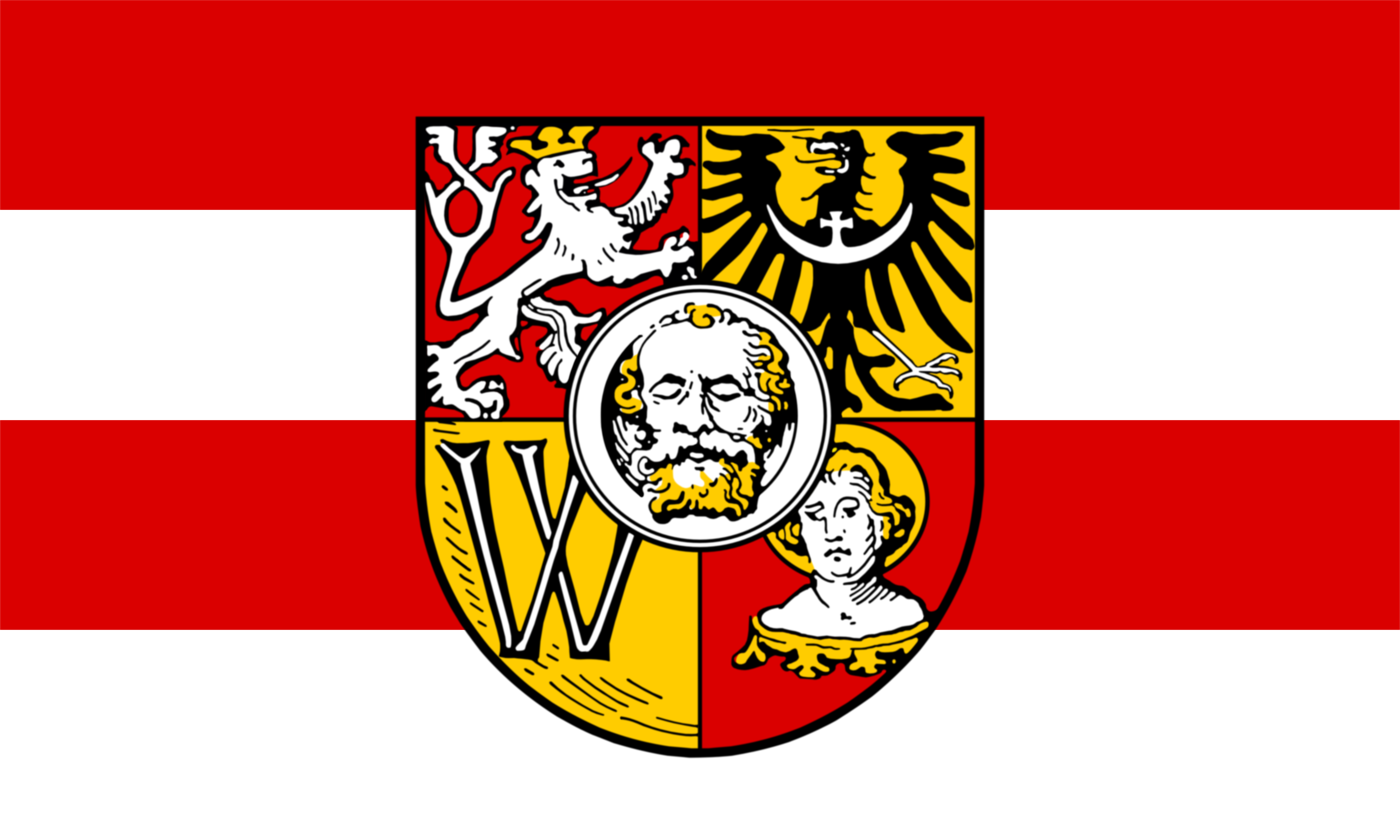
Flag of Breslau

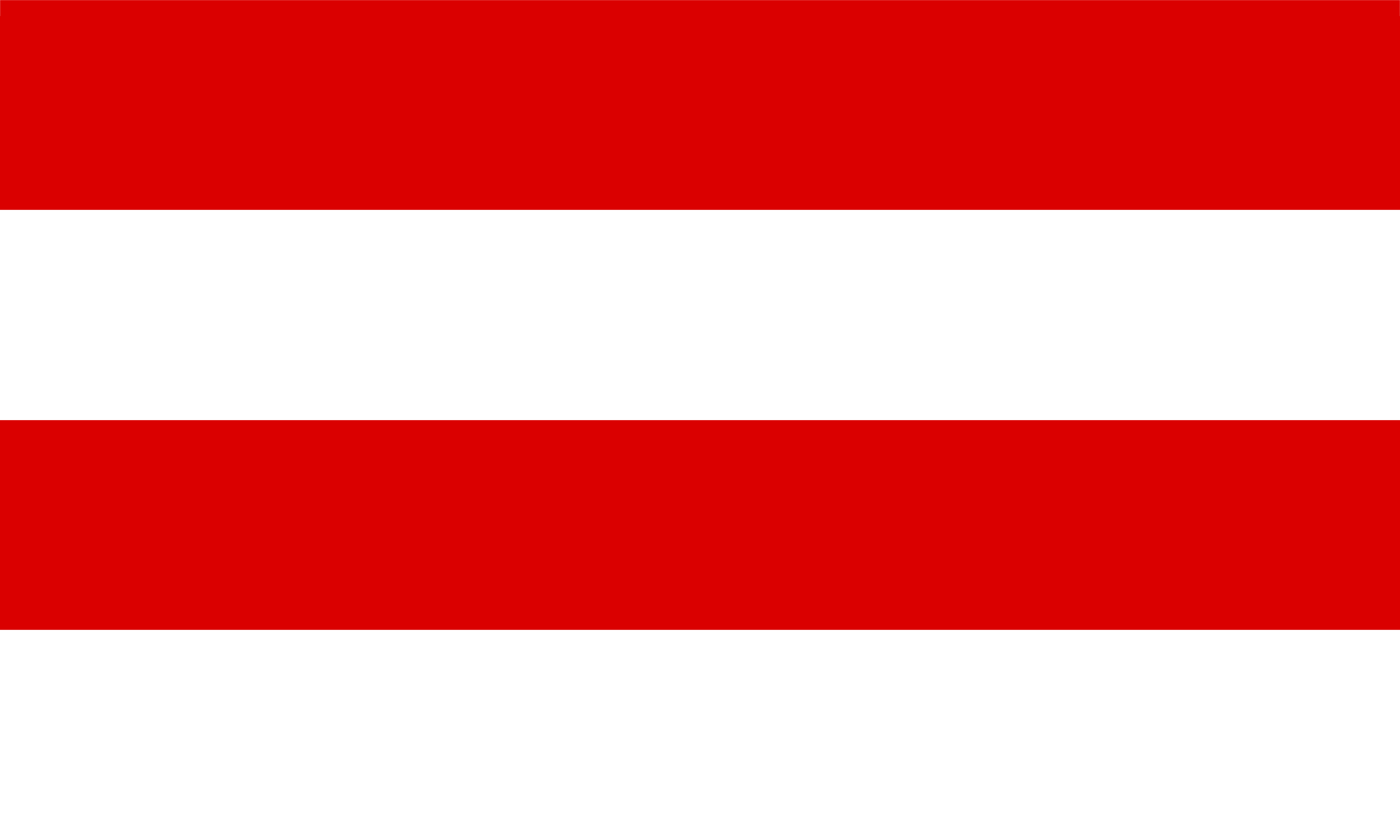
Flag of Breslau without the shield

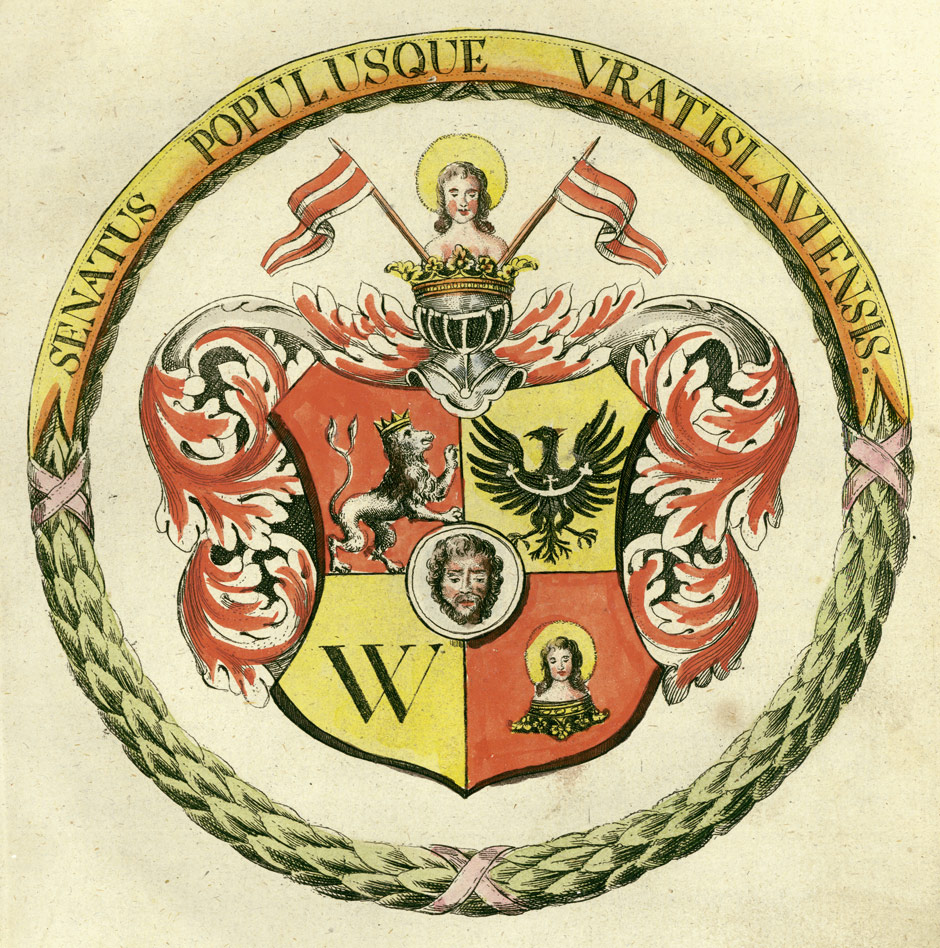
Coat of arms of Wrocław

== See also ==
- Flag of Silesia
- Flag of Brno
