= Flag of Anchorage, Alaska =

City of Anchorage
- Proportion: 2:3
- Adopted: 1973
- Design: A yellow field with the words "ANCHORAGE ALASKA" around a blue-bordered white circle featuring a blue anchor, blue airplane, yellow sun, and yellow sailboat
- Designed by: Joan Kimura

The city flag of Anchorage, Alaska was adopted by the city of Anchorage in 1973. It is a field of yellow with the seal of the city, which features a blue anchor in the foreground as well as a blue airplane, yellow sun, and yellow sailboat in the background. The words "ANCHORAGE ALASKA" are also present.

== History ==
In 1973, the city of Anchorage held a contest to adopt a city flag for the first time. Artist and longtime art professor at the University of Alaska Anchorage Joan Kimura submitted an acrylic painting of her design which was slightly adjusted and then adopted by the city. In 1975 the Anchorage Assembly passed a resolution to adapt the seal on the flag into the seal of the city, which is still in use today.

== Symbolism ==
The large anchor is in reference to the city's name as well as its origin as an anchorage, notably for the third voyage of James Cook. The modern airplane symbolizes Anchorage's role as a transportation hub with its Ted Stevens Anchorage International Airport. The yellow sun symbolizes the city's variation in daylight across the seasons due to its northern latitude. The ship is HMS Resolution used by Captain James Cook in his exploration of the Cook Inlet, upon which Anchorage was founded. It is unknown what the field of yellow is meant to represent, but it is possibly in reference to the Yukon Gold Rush.

== Reception ==
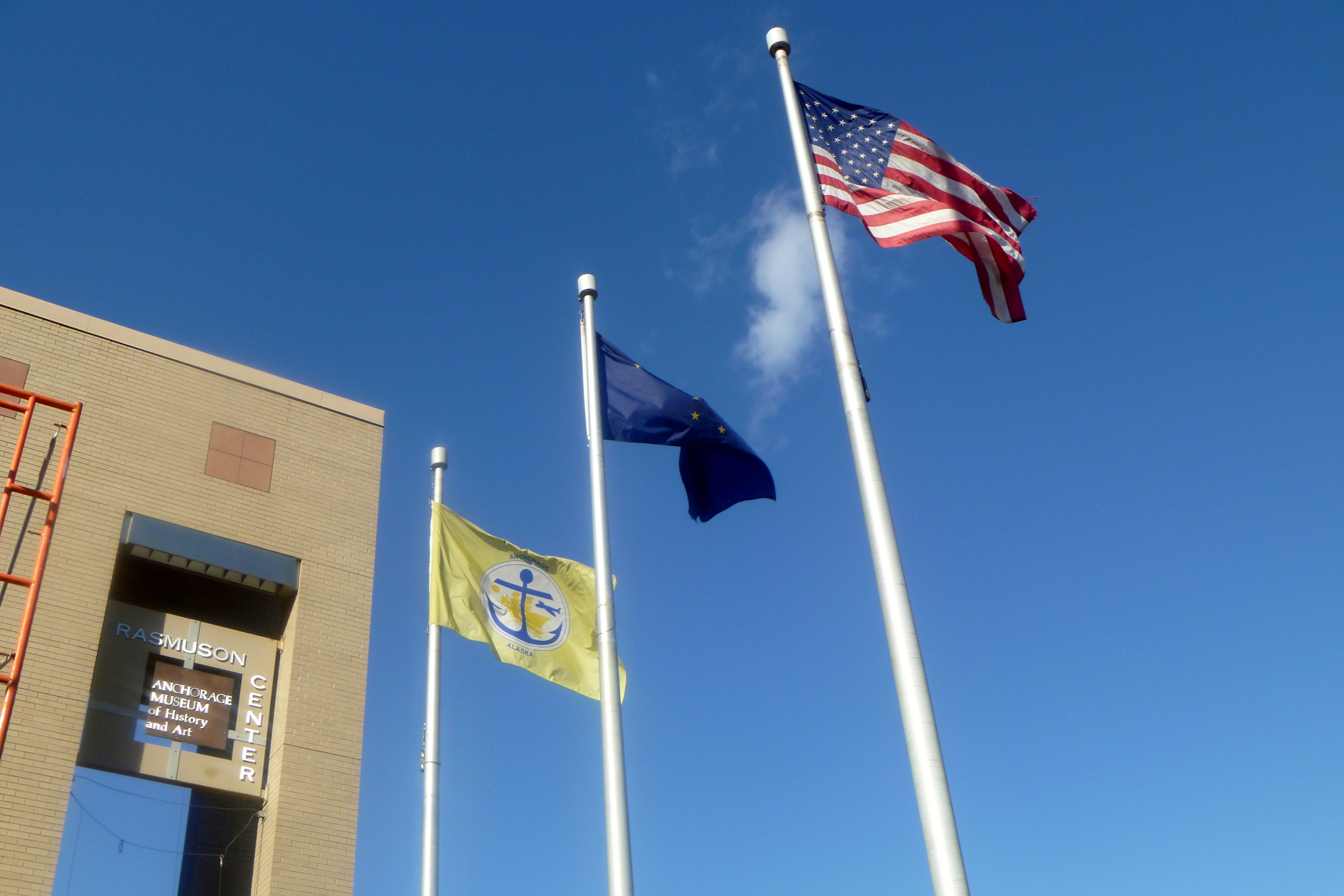
The flag flying alongside the Flag of Alaska and the Flag of the United States at the Anchorage Museum

The North American Vexillological Association ranked the Anchorage flag as the 29th best of 150 selected city flags in the United States and rated it a 5.33 out of 10. Ted Kaye, secretary of the Association, said "it has great imagery, an anchor for Anchorage is just super. But writing the words Anchorage, Alaska on the flag, in a sense, shows that Anchorage is insecure about its symbolism."

The flag is rarely seen in the city; it is most notably flown at the Anchorage public library and the Anchorage Museum.

The Kimura Art Gallery at the University of Alaska Anchorage is named in honor of Sam Kimura, Professor Emeritus of Art, and the flag's designer and also Professor of Art, Joan Kimura.
