= Flag of Chattanooga, Tennessee =

City of Chattanooga
- Use: Civil flag
- Proportion: 1:2
- Adopted: August 29, 2012
- Design: Green-blue-green horizontal triband, 1975-spec seal in center
- Flag of Chattanooga from 1923 to 2012
- Use: Civil flag
- Proportion: 2:3
- Adopted: 1923
- Design: A blue circle with one white five-pointed star with oak leaves and acorns on a rectangular field of red, with a strip of white and blue on the fly.

The current city flag of Chattanooga was adopted on August 29, 2012. It features a 1975-spec seal in the center of the green-blue-green horizontal triband. The former flag from 1923 featured a different design, including different colors and fly.

== History ==
=== Former flag ===
The former flag used from 1923 to 2012 had a blue circle with one white five-pointed star surrounded by a wreath of oak leaves on a rectangular field of red, with a strip of white and blue on the fly. Apart from the wreath and star symbol, the design was nearly identical to the flag of Tennessee, the state Chattanooga is located in.

=== Current flag ===
The current flag, adopted on August 29, 2012, is a green-blue-green horizontal triband with a modified version of the city's seal in center. The green stripes represent mountains while the blue stripe represents the Tennessee River. The seal was adopted in February 1975, and was designed by George Little.
