= Nová Ves u Jarošova =

- Municipality
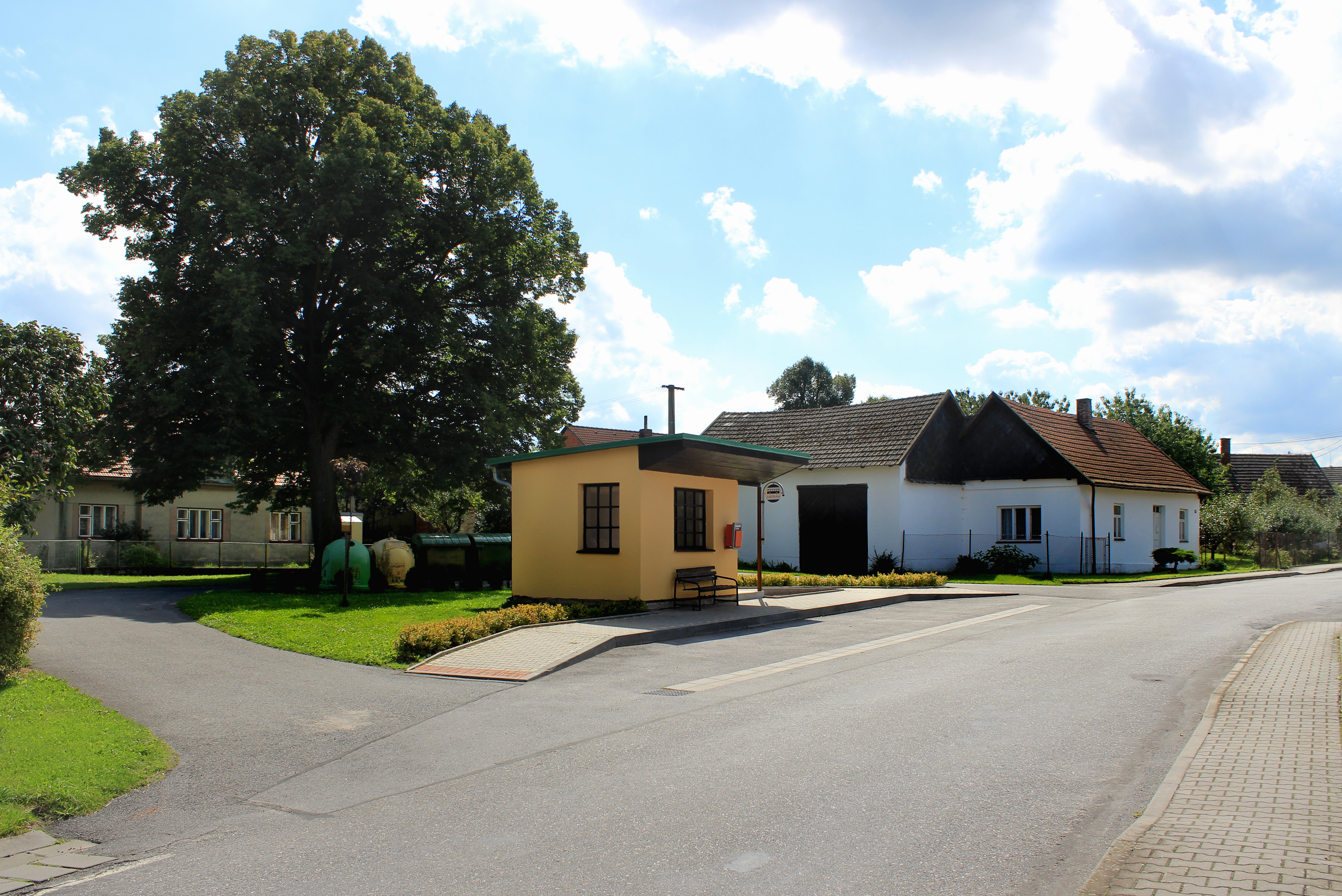
- Centre of Nová Ves u Jarošova

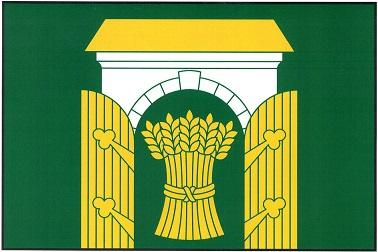
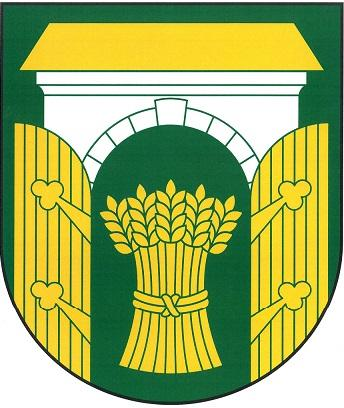
- Flag Coat of arms

- Location in the Czech Republic
- Coordinates: 49°50′15″N 16°9′36″E
- Country: Czech Republic
- Region: Pardubice
- District: Svitavy
- First mentioned: 1559

Area
  - Total: 2.38 km^{2} (0.92 sq mi)
- Elevation: 454 m (1,490 ft)

Population (2026-01-01)
  - Total: 66
  - Density: 28/km^{2} (72/sq mi)
- Time zone: UTC+1 (CET)
  - Summer (DST): UTC+2 (CEST)
- Postal code: 570 01
- Website: www.obecnovaves.com

Nová Ves u Jarošova is a municipality and village in Svitavy District in the Pardubice Region of the Czech Republic. It has about 70 inhabitants.

Nová Ves u Jarošova lies approximately 24 kilometres (15 mi) north-west of Svitavy, 36 km (22 mi) south-east of Pardubice, and 128 km (80 mi) east of Prague.

== Demographics ==
Historical population
Year	Pop.	±%
1869	229	—
1880	310	+35.4%
1890	282	−9.0%
1900	246	−12.8%
1910	269	+9.3%
1921	261	−3.0%
1930	243	−6.9%
1950	182	−25.1%
1961	156	−14.3%
1970	129	−17.3%
1980	86	−33.3%
1991	63	−26.7%
2001	63	+0.0%
2011	61	−3.2%
2021	59	−3.3%
Source: Censuses
