= Džbánice =

- Municipality
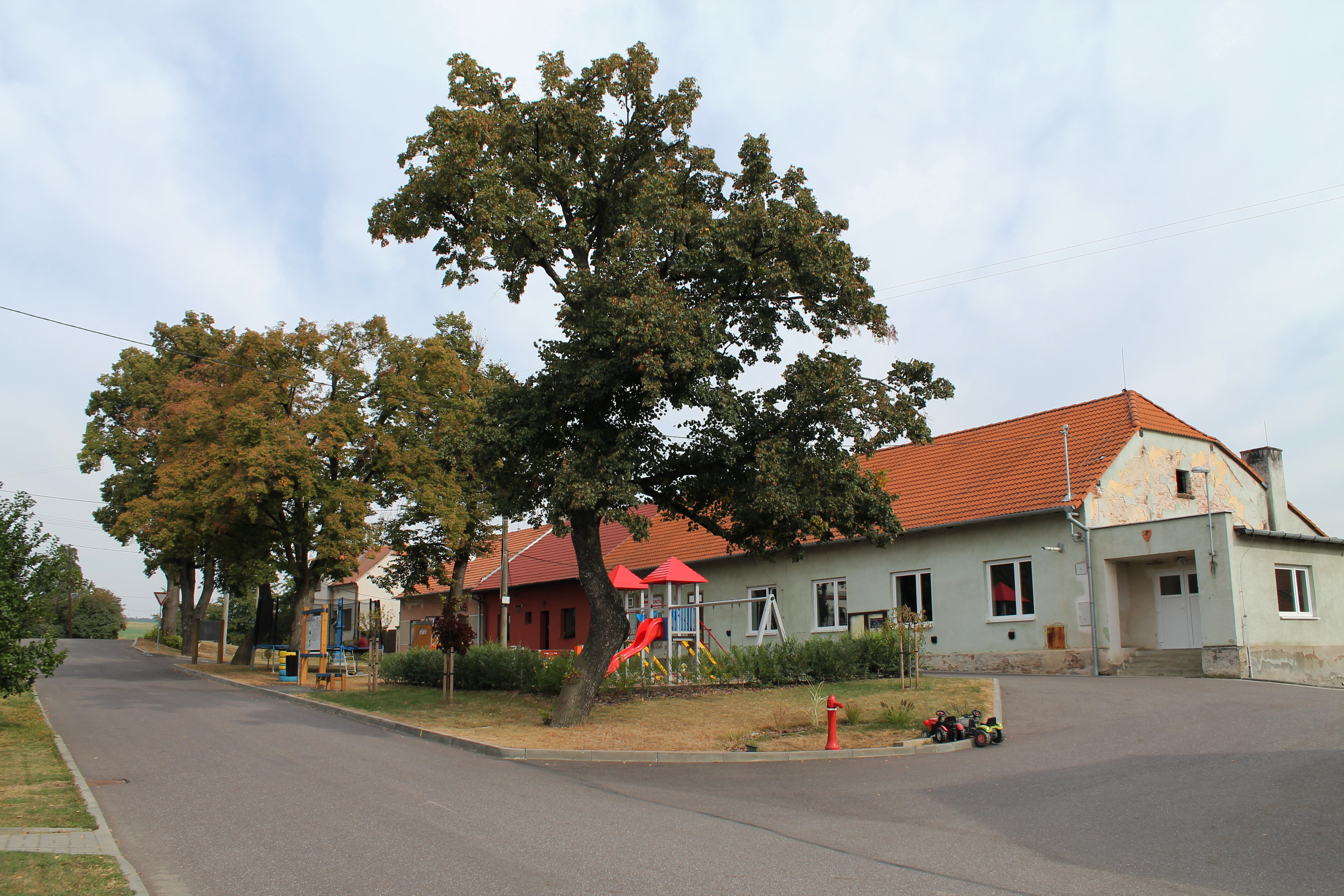
- Centre of Džbánice

- Flag Coat of arms

- Location in the Czech Republic
- Coordinates: 49°0′5″N 16°12′39″E
- Country: Czech Republic
- Region: South Moravian
- District: Znojmo
- First mentioned: 1253

Area
  - Total: 5.40 km^{2} (2.08 sq mi)
- Elevation: 321 m (1,053 ft)

Population (2026-01-01)
  - Total: 135
  - Density: 25.0/km^{2} (64.7/sq mi)
- Time zone: UTC+1 (CET)
  - Summer (DST): UTC+2 (CEST)
- Postal code: 671 71
- Website: www.obecdzbanice.cz

Džbánice is a municipality and village in Znojmo District in the South Moravian Region of the Czech Republic. It has about 100 inhabitants.

Džbánice lies approximately 22 kilometres (14 mi) north-east of Znojmo, 37 km (23 mi) south-west of Brno, and 177 km (110 mi) south-east of Prague.

== Demographics ==
Historical population
Year	Pop.	±%
1869	213	—
1880	231	+8.5%
1890	247	+6.9%
1900	244	−1.2%
1910	259	+6.1%
1921	290	+12.0%
1930	293	+1.0%
1950	219	−25.3%
1961	227	+3.7%
1970	222	−2.2%
1980	219	−1.4%
1991	189	−13.7%
2001	163	−13.8%
2011	155	−4.9%
2021	143	−7.7%
Source: Censuses
