= Flag of Zielona Góra =

Polish municipal flag

Zielona Góra
- Proportion: 5:8
- Adopted: 16 September 1965

The flag, that serves as the symbol of the city of Zielona Góra, Lubusz Voivodeship, in western Poland, is divided into three fields, including the vertical yellow stripe on the left, and two equally-sized horizontal stripes, white on the top, and green on the bottom, on the right. It was established in 1965.

== Design ==
The flag of the city of Zielona Góra is divided into three fields. To the left, the flag has a vertical yellow stripe, which length equals 1/3 of the flag's. To the right, it is divided into two equally-sized horizontal stripes, white on the top, and green on the bottom. Theirs length equals 2/3 of the flag's. The flag proportions have the aspect ratio of its height to its width of 5:8.

The yellow stripe symbolized the historical allegiance of the city to Silesian Piast dynasty that ruled the area in the High Middle Ages, and whose coat of arms contained yellow colour, as a background. The white stripe symbolizes the city's long textile industry tradition, and the green stripe symbolizes its winemaking and wine grapes harvest traditions.

== History ==
The flag was established by the City Council on September 16, 1965, making it one of the oldest city flags of Poland. Originally, the proportions were 1:2, but were later altered to 5:8.
