= Coat of arms of Poznań =

Polish coat of arms

Coat of Arms of Poznań

The coat of arms of Poznań consists of white (not silver) city walls with three towers. On the left (heraldic) tower stands Saint Peter with a key and on the heraldic right one stands Saint Paul with a sword. In the gate there are two golden crossed keys with a cross above. Over the middle tower, which contains a single window and is topped by a battlement, there is a gothic shield with a white eagle in crown. On the sides of the two saints there are golden crescents and stars. All of those elements are on a blue field. Over the shield there is golden crown. Author of modern version of coat of arms is Jerzy Bąk.

== History ==
The first known image of the Poznań coat of arms is on the seal of a document dated 1 May 1344. It contains all of the elements of the modern coat of arms except the crown over the shield. Throughout history, simpler versions were sometimes used: with only walls and keys or even only keys and cross on blue field. In 1440 king Vladislaus III of Varna gave Poznań the right and privilege to seal documents with red, royal wax. This privilege also allowed the town court to judge people of all estates, including nobles and church hierarchs.

During Prussian-German rule, the Polish white eagle on a red background was coloured black on a gold background (a Prussian eagle), and the city towers were brick-red instead of white.

== Symbolic ==
- City walls – symbol of town founded on Magdeburger law.
- St. Peter and St. Paul – patrons of cathedral and city. Poznań diocese is the oldest in Poland so it has right to this same patrons as St. Peter's Basilica in Vatican
- shield with white eagle – Coat of Arms of Przemysł I, founder of town on magdeburger law and his son Przemysł II, king of Poland with seat in Poznań
- keys – municipal self-government
- cross – Christian faith
- crescents and stars – unknown but resembling Leliwa coat of arms
- crown over Coat of Arms – capital function in history of Poznań
