= Flag of Albuquerque, New Mexico =

City of Albuquerque
- Proportion: 10:17 (unofficial)
- Adopted: 1968
- Design: A red field containing a yellow Zia sun symbol with the number "1706" in the middle circle, the word "Albuquerque" in yellow italics just below that, and a yellow thunderbird in the canton
- Designed by: Dr. Richard P. Vann

The flag of Albuquerque is the official municipal flag of the city of Albuquerque, New Mexico. The design is a red field with yellow elements (a Zia sun symbol with the number "1706" in the middle, the word "Albuquerque" in italics just below the sun symbol, and a flying thunderbird in the canton).

Multiple pushes have been made to redesign the flag, even getting some city council members to suggest an open contest and public vote. No change has been made despite these efforts.

== Design and symbolism ==
The Albuquerque flag reverses the colors of the New Mexico flag, with yellow elements on a red field. The central element on both flags is the Zia sun symbol, which represents the spiritual importance of the sun and the sacred number four in the culture of the Zia people. The rays of the Zia symbol represent the four cardinal directions, four seasons, four times of the day, and four stages of life. The center of the Zia symbol bears the year of the city's founding, 1706, and the name "Albuquerque" is printed underneath in a Spanish gothic script. In the upper hoist is a stylized bird symbol, consisting of a streamlined bomb superimposed over and perpendicular to a crescent moon, "acknowledging Albuquerque's contributions to the nuclear-and-space age."

== History ==
The idea of creating a city flag was first discussed by the Albuquerque Chamber of Commerce in 1967. Later that same year, the city received a flag from Sasebo, its sister city in Japan, ahead of a planned visit by a delegation from Sasebo to Albuquerque. The Chamber of Commerce wanted a flag to present in return and announced a contest to design one running from December 1967 to March 1968. The winning entry was designed by Richard P. Vann, a local optometrist. The new flag was flown for the first time on June 21, 1968, after which it was presented to the deputy mayor of Sasebo.

Another copy of the flag was presented to the city of Albuquerque on January 13, 1969, by the Camp Fire Girls organization under the direction of Joyce Miller. This flag was reported to be 5 feet (1.5 m) by 8 feet (2.4 m) and was placed in the City Commission chamber. Other handmade copies of the flag were also distributed by the Camp Fire Girls. A June 1969 article stated that "Mrs. Miller has made all of the Albuquerque flags now in existence". Use of the flag became more widespread after the Zonta Club donated 140 flags for use on public buildings around the city in November 1969 and 108 more flags for Albuquerque Public Schools in 1970. The organization distributed a further batch of 200 flags in 1985 to replace the earlier ones. In 1984, astronaut Mike Mullane took an Albuquerque flag into space aboard the Space Shuttle Discovery during its first mission, and then presented it to the city upon his return.

The flag placed 25th out of 150 American city flag designs in a 2004 North American Vexillological Association survey.
