= Flag of Jacksonville, Florida =

Flag of an American city

City of Jacksonville
- Bold New City of the South
- Proportion: 2:3
- Adopted: February 24, 1976; 50 years ago
- Design: The flag shall be divided horizontally into two equal panels: The upper panel has a rampant equestrian statue of Andrew Jackson in silhouette over sunburst; the lower panel has a silhouette of Duval County and the words CITY OF JACKSONVILLE, FLORIDA in a recumbent concave arc thereunder, all on a solid field. The rays of the sunburst, silhouette of Duval County and the words CITY OF JACKSONVILLE, FLORIDA are gold; the equestrian statue of Andrew Jackson is dark brown, the upper panel background is white and the lower panel field is orange.

The current flag of Jacksonville, Florida was adopted by the Jacksonville City Council on February 24, 1976. It was designed by Don Bozeman, winner of a design contest prior to the 1975 Bold CityFest, the annual celebration of the city/county government consolidation. The city's previous flag, designed by Edmund Jackson and adopted in 1914, was considered outdated.

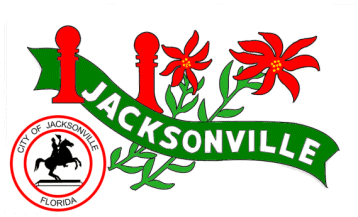
Previous Jacksonville flag, from 1914 to 1976.

The brown silhouette of a mounted Andrew Jackson is taken from a bronze statue in the downtown urban core, and represents the city's history and namesake. The sunburst represents a bright future. The map silhouette of the city/county with the St. Johns River through the middle shows the consolidated community and the large impact of the river. The color orange is significant in the "Sunshine State" and one of Jacksonville's neighborhoods is named Mandarin.

A survey of flag design quality by the North American Vexillological Association ranked Jacksonville's flag the second best in Florida and 38th best of 150 American city flags. It earned a score 5.03 out of 10 based on meaningful symbolism, use of 2–3 basic colors, and distinctiveness, although it did not meet criteria for simple design and failed the "no lettering or seals" criterion.

== See also ==
- Flag of Florida
