= Flag of the Latvian Soviet Socialist Republic =

Flag of the U.S.S.R. republic of Latvia

Latvian Soviet Socialist Republic
- Use: Civil and state flag, civil and state ensign
- Proportion: 1:2
- Adopted: 17 January 1953
- Relinquished: 27 February 1990
- Design: A plain red flag with a golden hammer and sickle and a gold-bordered red star in its upper canton with the blue and white rippling water at the bottom.
- Reverse flag
- Use: Civil and state flag, civil and state ensign
- Latvijas karogs
- Flag of the Latvian SSR (1990) and the Republic of Latvia (1990–)
- Use: Civil and state flag, civil ensign
- Proportion: 1:2
- Adopted: 27 February 1990
- Design: A carmine red field bisected by a narrow white stripe (one-fifth the width of the flag).
- Designed by: Ansis Cīrulis

The flag of the Latvian Soviet Socialist Republic shows a yellow hammer and sickle and outlined star on a red field above rippling water at the bottom, and was adopted by the former Latvian Soviet Socialist Republic on January 17, 1953.

== History ==
The first socialist Latvian state, the Latvian Socialist Soviet Republic, shown a red flag with the inscription LSPR.

Prior to this, from 25 August 1940, the flag was red with the gold hammer and sickle in the top-left corner, with the Latin characters LPSR (Latvijas Padomju Sociālistiskā Republika) above them in gold in a serif font.

The Soviet-era flag was officially replaced on 27 February 1990, when the national flag of Latvia was reintroduced. Since 2013, the use of a Latvian SSR flag at public events is banned.

== Gallery ==
Flag of the Latvian SSR (1918–1920)

Flag of the Latvian SSR (1940–1953)

Early variant of the flag of the Latvian SSR (1953–1967)

Flag of the Latvian SSR (1953–1990)

== See also ==
- Coat of arms of the Latvian SSR
- Flag of the Soviet Union
- Flag of Latvia
