= Janská =

- Municipality
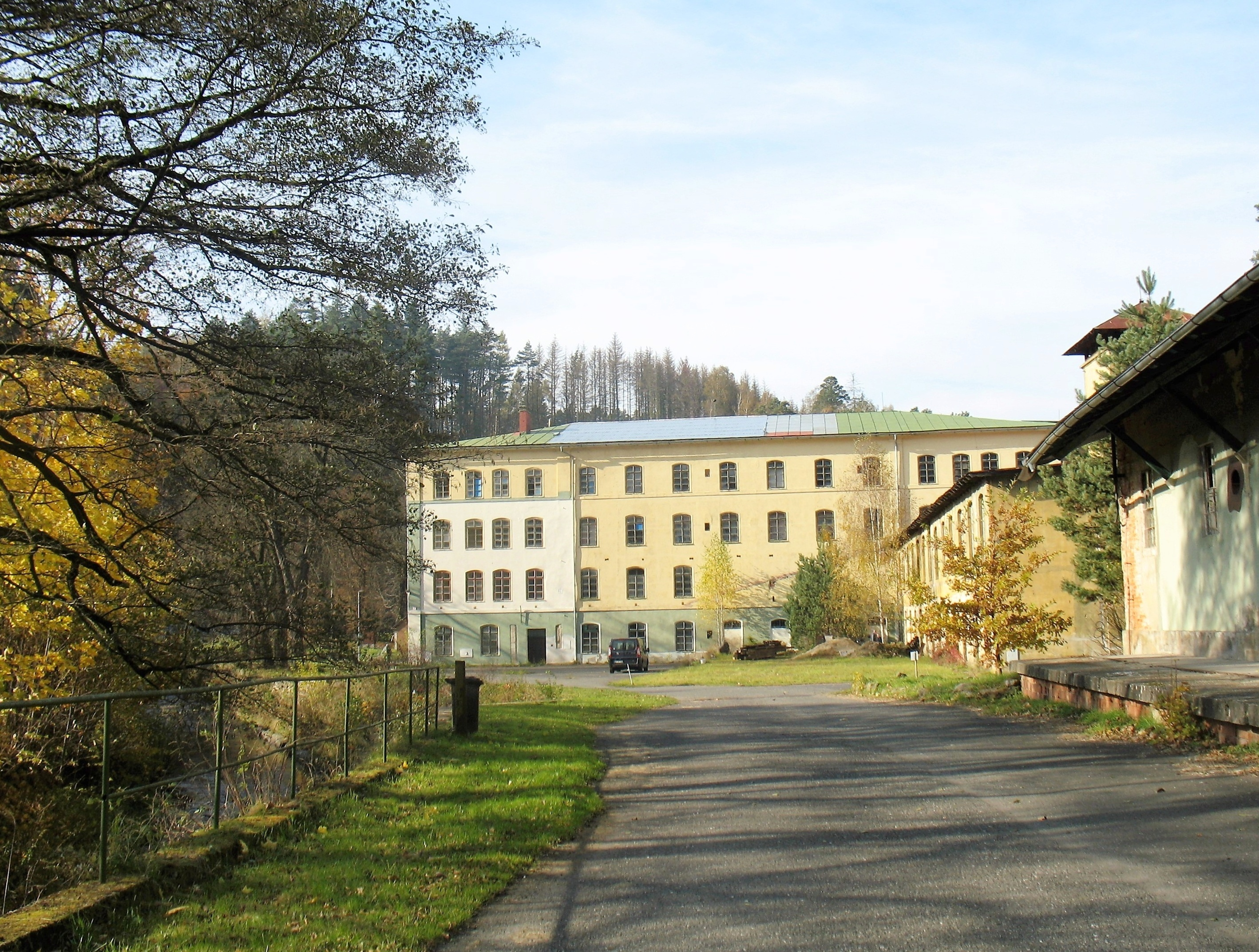
- Rabštejn Underground Factory complex

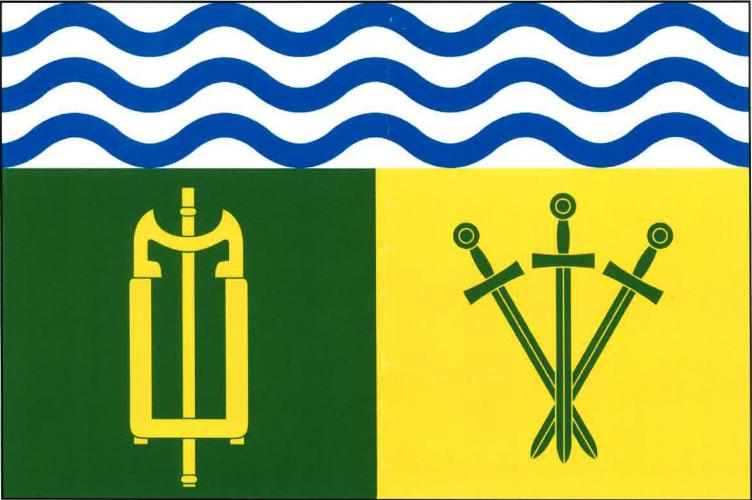
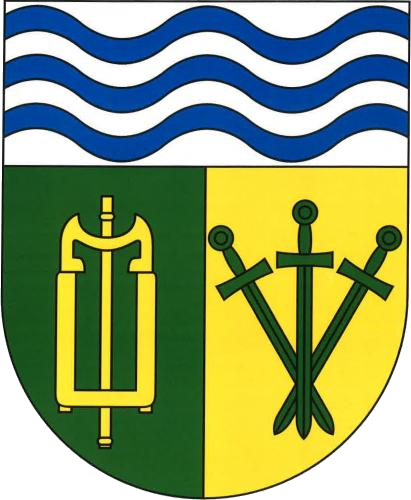
- Flag Coat of arms

- Location in the Czech Republic
- Coordinates: 50°48′16″N 14°21′49″E
- Country: Czech Republic
- Region: Ústí nad Labem
- District: Děčín
- First mentioned: 1380

Area
  - Total: 5.36 km^{2} (2.07 sq mi)
- Elevation: 230 m (750 ft)

Population (2026-01-01)
  - Total: 212
  - Density: 39.6/km^{2} (102/sq mi)
- Time zone: UTC+1 (CET)
  - Summer (DST): UTC+2 (CEST)
- Postal code: 405 02
- Website: www.obec-janska.cz

Janská (German: Johnsbach, Jonsbach) is a municipality and village in Děčín District in the Ústí nad Labem Region of the Czech Republic. It has about 200 inhabitants.

Janská lies approximately 15 kilometres (9 mi) east of Děčín, 29 km (18 mi) north-east of Ústí nad Labem, and 80 km (50 mi) north of Prague.

== Demographics ==
Historical population
Year	Pop.	±%
1869	424	—
1880	557	+31.4%
1890	534	−4.1%
1900	452	−15.4%
1910	445	−1.5%
1921	466	+4.7%
1930	516	+10.7%
1950	189	−63.4%
1961	266	+40.7%
1970	243	−8.6%
1980	267	+9.9%
1991	203	−24.0%
2001	198	−2.5%
2011	192	−3.0%
2021	205	+6.8%
Source: Censuses
