= Flag of Las Vegas =

City of Las Vegas
- Use: City flag
- Proportion: 3:5
- Adopted: October 2, 1968; 58 years ago
- Design: Blue field with gray diagonal stripe and an alternative design of the city seal in canton
- Designed by: Kenneth A. Bouton
- The former flag of Las Vegas, briefly seen in the early 2000s, as a possible replacement for the original.
- Proportion: 2:3
- Relinquished: Sometime before 2004 or 2005
- Design: The city seal on a white field

The flag of Las Vegas consists of blue field with a diagonal gray stripe running from the top of the hoist to the bottom of the fly. The city seal was designed by Richard Thompson, adopted on March 16, 1966, and is located on the canton (i.e. upper left) breaking the stripe.

== Design and symbolism ==
The dominant color of the flag is royal blue, which symbolizes the blue skies of the state of Nevada. The gray stripe alludes to Nevada's nickname as "The Silver State". On the same day as the adoption of the flag, these two colors were adopted as the official colors of Las Vegas. The seal shows three tall buildings- the middle is the tallest, the left is the shortest, and the right is midway the height between the two. Each of these buildings have yellow marquees, going downward from left to right. The buildings and marquees symbolize tourism, a major industry for the city. To the left of the buildings is the Hoover Dam, also in white. The dam is a major landmark in the Clark County area. At the base of the dam is the Colorado River, which runs to about the middle of the seal. At the very left is a small portion of a brown cliff, symbolizing the mountainous terrain. To the right of the three buildings is a silhouette of Sunrise Mountain, further conveying the mountains of Las Vegas and the surrounding area. In front of the mountain is a green four-limbed Joshua tree, a reference to the desert landscape of the area. The sun, in yellow with orange rays, rises behind the mountains and is about the height of the right-most building. The sky above this is a lighter shade of blue than the royal blue. A black jet and black contrail above the scene alludes to the importance of air traffic, both civilian and military, in the region. The outer ring of the seal has the words "City Of Las Vegas" on the top portion and "Nevada" on the bottom portion, both in silver lettering.

== History ==
The Las Vegas City Council authorized a contest for a city flag on April 7, 1965. The winning design was created by Kenneth A. Bouton, an assistant to the city manager. The winning flag was not officially adopted for another three years, finally being adopted on October 2, 1968. In a 2004 North American Vexillological Association survey of American city flags, Las Vegas ranked 93rd out of 150.
