= Němčičky (Znojmo District) =

- Municipality
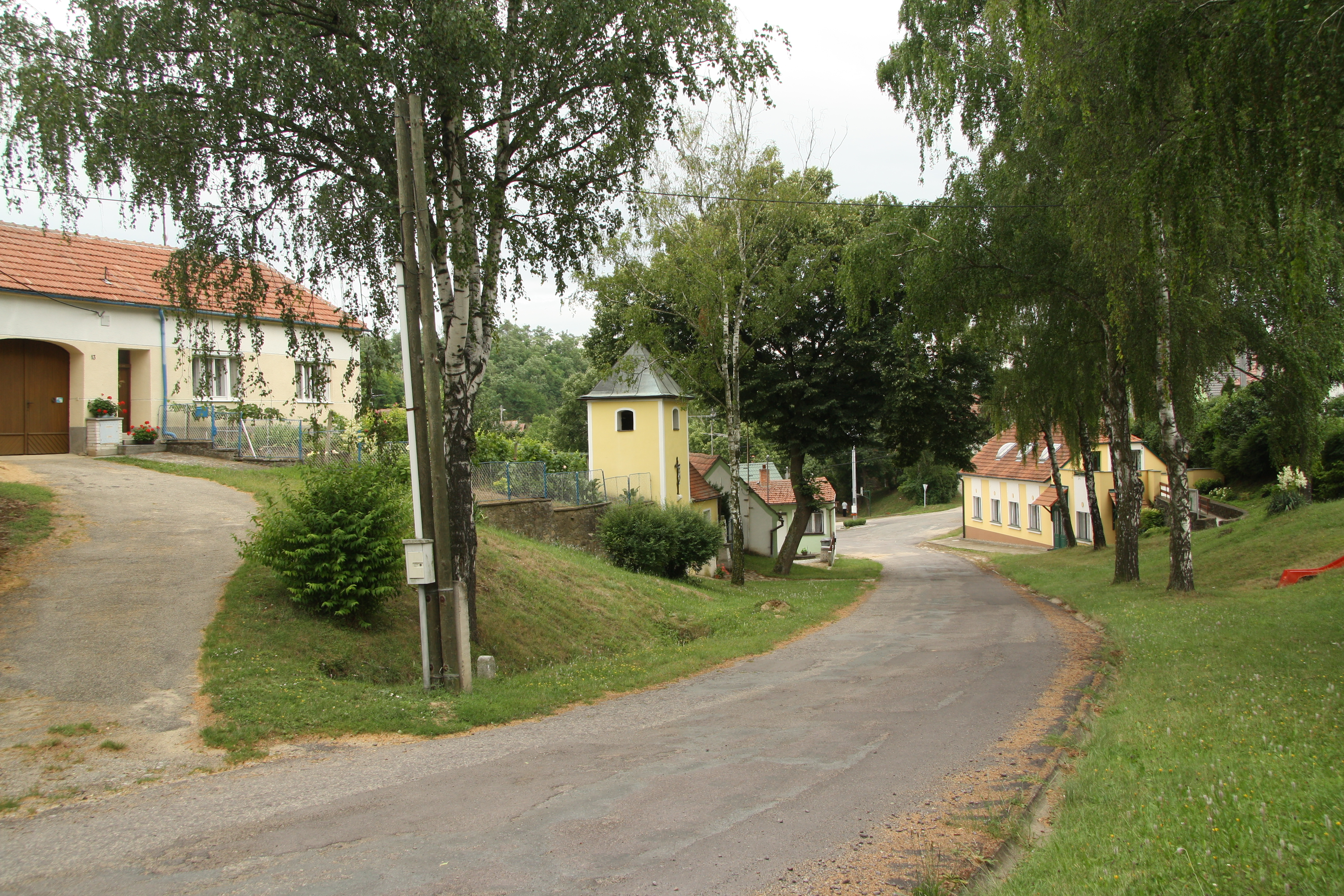
- Centre of Němčičky

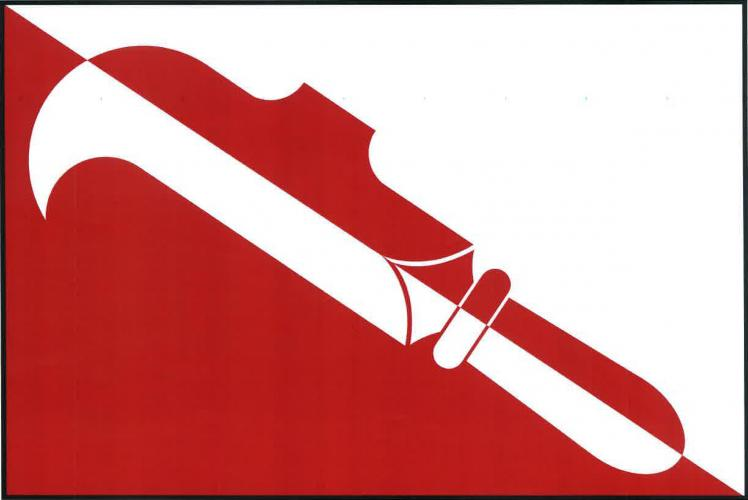
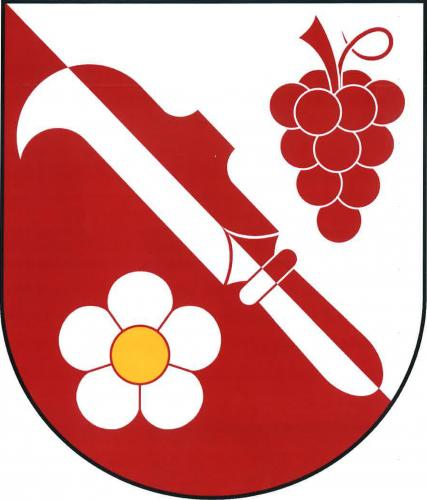
- Flag Coat of arms

- Location in the Czech Republic
- Coordinates: 48°56′32″N 16°5′18″E
- Country: Czech Republic
- Region: South Moravian
- District: Znojmo
- First mentioned: 1350

Area
  - Total: 4.95 km^{2} (1.91 sq mi)
- Elevation: 270 m (890 ft)

Population (2026-01-01)
  - Total: 84
  - Density: 17/km^{2} (44/sq mi)
- Time zone: UTC+1 (CET)
  - Summer (DST): UTC+2 (CEST)
- Postal code: 671 53
- Website: www.obecnemcicky.cz

Němčičky is a municipality and village in Znojmo District in the South Moravian Region of the Czech Republic. It has about 80 inhabitants.

Němčičky lies approximately 12 kilometres (7 mi) north-east of Znojmo, 48 km (30 mi) south-west of Brno, and 176 km (109 mi) south-east of Prague.

== Demographics ==
Historical population
Year	Pop.	±%
1869	174	—
1880	171	−1.7%
1890	199	+16.4%
1900	207	+4.0%
1910	220	+6.3%
1921	206	−6.4%
1930	185	−10.2%
1950	162	−12.4%
1961	149	−8.0%
1970	140	−6.0%
1980	117	−16.4%
1991	104	−11.1%
2001	98	−5.8%
2011	90	−8.2%
2021	81	−10.0%
Source: Censuses
