= Flags and coats of arms of the Austrian states =

The flags of the Austrian states show two (or three) stripes in the main colours of the respective arms. These flags are the state flags and are shown with the coats of arms, although it is common for them to be shown without it. Without the coats of arms, some flags are very similar, such as those of Tyrol and Upper Austria (also nearly identical to the flag of Poland) plus those of Salzburg, Vienna and Vorarlberg similar to the flag of Indonesia or Monaco. Frequently, the flags are used in vertical variants with or without coat of arms. The coats of arms of the Austrian States are also shown.

| State | Year adopted | Flag without arms | Flag with arms | Coat of arms |
|---|---|---|---|---|
| Burgenland | 1971 | | | |
| Carinthia (Kärnten) | 1946 | | | |
| Lower Austria (Niederösterreich) | 1954 | | | |
| Salzburg | 1921 | | | |
| Styria (Steiermark) | 1960 | | | |
| Tyrol (Tirol) | 1945 | | | |
| Upper Austria (Oberösterreich) | 1949 | | | |
| Vienna (Wien) | 1924 | | | |
| Vorarlberg | 1946 | | | |

== See also ==
- Flag of Austria
- Coat of arms of Austria
