= Flag of New York =

Flag of New York may refer to:

- Flag of the State of New York
- Flags of New York City
