= Flag of Long Beach, California =

City flag

Long Beach
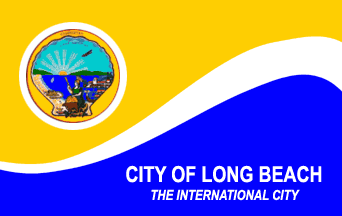
- Use: Municipal
- Proportion: 12:19
- Adopted: July 5, 1967; 59 years ago
- Design: A gold and blue flag divided horizontally by a widening white wave. The inner area of the city seal is located on the top left, outlined by white and "CITY OF LONG BEACH THE INTERNATIONAL CITY" written in white sans-serif is located on the bottom right.
- Designed by: Derived from design by Al Maddy

The flag of Long Beach, California, was adopted on July 5, 1967. It incorporates the city's seal, name, and motto on a gold, white, and blue field. The field is designed to be reminiscent of a beach. Each of the colors also has its own meaning, the gold represents the sand on the beach, the white represents the city's clean air, and the blue represents the Pacific Ocean.

== History ==
=== Former flag (1948–1967) ===
In 1948, Corporal Eugenia McGrath of the Long Beach Lancerettes, a semi-military mounted troop of female lancers, designed the first city flag of Long Beach. A physical form of the flag was made by Captain Arvery Lehman and was flown by the Lancerettes in city parades.

=== Current flag (1967–present) ===
By 1956, the city of Long Beach had begun to consider adopting a new flag. The city assigned three city officials, Fielding C. Combs, the director of public relations, Edwin Castagna, the city librarian, and Jerome Donson, the municipal art director, with making the new flag and called for it to have the city seal on it. Later on, per the request of the public relations committee, the city council invited organizations to submit flag designs as well. By 1958, the need to adopt a new city flag had become a more urgent issue. The three officials originally tasked with designing the new flag later came to the conclusion that the seal was too complicated to be on a flag and Combs suggested that citizens should send in proposals. The city held several flag design contests in the early 1960s but none of the proposals were accepted. One person later suggested that the city flag should be based on the flag of the Port of Long Beach, which was designed in 1964 by Al Maddy, the port's Director of Administration. A city flag derived from Maddy's design ended up being adopted by the city council on July 5, 1967.

=== Vietnam War ===
During the Vietnam War in late 1967, shortly after the city of Long Beach had adopted its current flag, Lance Corporal Steven Radford, a resident of Long Beach, received a copy of the Press-Telegram from his parents, Ernest and Hazel. After reading in the paper that the city had recently adopted a new flag, he decided that he wanted one to remind him of his hometown and sent a letter to the Long Beach City College's Volksen Club requesting one. The club responded to his request by presenting a flag to his parents to send to him. By the time Radford was sent the flag, he was recovering from an injury aboard the USS Sanctuary.

On Christmas Day of 1968, the flag of Long Beach was added to the USS New Jersey, a Long Beach-based battleship which was deployed in the Gulf of Tonkin during the Vietnam War. It was placed on the quarterdeck of the ship alongside the flag of the United States and the flag of New Jersey.

=== Boy Scouts of America ===
For the 1969 National Scout Jamboree in Farragut State Park, Idaho, the Long Beach branch of the Boy Scouts of America brought a city flag to accompany them.

=== Rose Parade ===
For the 1973 Rose Parade, the Long Beach Mounted Police, serving as the parade's color guard, carried the city flag as well as the mounted police banner and 26 American flags.

=== 2004 North American Vexillological Association survey ===
In 2004, the North American Vexillological Association held a survey where it ranked 150 American city flags based on the quality of their designs. The flag of Long Beach placed 90th, receiving a score of 3.70 out of 10.
