= Flag of Santa Barbara, California =

City of Santa Barbara
- Adopted: 1923
- Design: A horizontal triband of white (top), red (middle), and yellow (bottom), with a red tower symbol in the top left corner

The flag of Santa Barbara, California, was created in 1920, and was adopted as the official city flag in 1923. The tower is in red on white, the colors of Saint Barbara. The red and gold (the rosette and ribbon of the king of Spain) recall the city's Spanish origins.

The tower in the left-hand corner is the tower in which Saint Barbara (patron saint and namesake) was trapped during her execution.

The flag is used in governmental chambers and on promotional materials, and prominently displayed outdoors in the city's downtown and on some city government buildings. The flag bears some resemblance to the flag of Ossetia.
