= Flag of the Tajik Soviet Socialist Republic =

Tajik Soviet Socialist Republic
- Use: Civil and state flag, civil and state ensign
- Proportion: 1:2
- Adopted: 20 March 1953
- Relinquished: 24 November 1992
- Design: A triband flag sporting the Pan-Iranian colors of red, white and green, manifested in the large white and green stripes in the middle of the red flag, with a golden hammer and sickle in the upper canton.
- Designed by: M.P. Shlykov
- Reverse flag
- Use: Civil and state flag, civil and state ensign

The flag of the Tajik Soviet Socialist Republic was the red Soviet flag with white and green stripes below the gold hammer and sickle, with the measures: 1/2 red, 1/5 white, 1/10 green, 1/5 red. The flag sported the Pan-Iranian colors of red, white and green, as a nod to the republic's Persian-descended culture. The flag was adopted on March 20, 1953 by decree of the Supreme Soviet of the Tajik SSR:

The national flag of the Tajik Soviet Socialist Republic is a panel consisting of four horizontal colored stripes: the upper band of red which is half the width of the flag; white stripe, making one fifth of the width of the flag; green stripes, is one-tenth the width of the flag, and the lower band of red color, is one-fifth the width of the flag. On top of the red band at the flagpole located gold hammer and sickle and above them is a five-pointed red star framed by a gold border. The ratio of the flag's width to its length is 1: 2. The fitting of the hammer and sickle into a square whose side wound 1/4 width of the flag. The sharp end of the sickle falls in the middle of the upper side of the square, handles the sickle and hammer rest on the bottom corners of the square. hammer with a handle length is 3/4 of the diagonal of a square. The five-pointed star in a circle fits 1/8 width of the flag relating to the upper side of the square. Distance vertical axis of the star, the hammer and sickle from the grapnel is equal to 1/4 of the flag's width. The distance from the top edge of the flag of the flag to the center of the star - 1/10 of the flag's width.

The red represents the unity of the republic and the aspect of workers' revolution, white symbolized cotton production, the basis of Tajik agriculture, and the green was for other agricultural produce.

After 1953, the flag received a unique reverse side. The reverse side of the flag was the same as the obverse with the exception of it lacking the yellow hammer and sickle. In 1991, after Tajikistan became an independent country, this flag was used until a new flag was created and adopted in 1992.

== Historical flags ==
The first specifically Tajik flag was introduced in 1929. Before that, Tajikistan had been part of the Bukharan SSR (partly transferred to the Turkestan SSR in 1924); before the Russian revolution it had been part of the Emirate of Bukhara (since 1873 a protectorate of the Russian Empire).

23 February 1929 – April 1929	First flag of the Tajik ASSR	Adopted on 23 February 1929, with the coat of arms in the top-left corner.
April 1929 – 24 February 1931	Flag of the Tajik ASSR	
24 February 1931 – 04.07.1935	Flag of the Tajik SSR	Latin script (ç.i.ş.toç)
04.07.1935 – 26 May 1936	Flag of the Tajik SSR	Latin script (ÇSS Tocikiston)
26 September 1936 – 1938	Flag of the Tajik SSR	Latin (ÇSS Tocikiston) and Cyrillic script, with hammer and sickle
1938 – 28 September 1940	Flag of the Tajik SSR	Latin (RSS Tocikiston) and Cyrillic script
28 September 1940 – 1953	Flag of the Tajik SSR	Cyrillic script only, in Tajik (РСС Тоҷикистон) and Russian (Таджикская ССР).
20 April 1953 – 24 November 1992	Flag of the Tajik SSR and the post-Soviet Republic of Tajikistan	A red banner with a large white and small green stripe in the middle (below the gold hammer and sickle). The colors are a nod to the republic's Persian-influenced culture.
20 April 1953 – 24 November 1992 (reverse)	Flag of the Tajik SSR and the post-Soviet Republic of Tajikistan	Reverse of national flag.

Following independence on September 9, 1991, the flag of the Tajik SSR remained in use as the alternative national flag of Tajikistan until a new Tajik flag was adopted in November 1992, becoming the last post-Soviet country to receive a completely new flag.

== See also ==
- Flag of the Soviet Union
- Coat of arms of the Tajik SSR
- Flag of Tajikistan
