= Flag of El Paso, Texas =

City of El Paso
- Proportion: 3:5
- Adopted: March 29, 1962
- Design: A dark blue field with a traditional El Paso emblem in the center
- Designed by: City planning department of El Paso

The current city flag of El Paso, Texas is an augmentation of the city's seal in the center of a dark blue field, which has been in place since 1962.

== Design and symbolism ==
In the center of the emblem is a silver five-pointed star, representing faith. The left half of each point is shaded a darker color, giving the star a three-dimensional appearance. The star's design, not the color, is the exact used on the seal and coat of arms of Texas. Completely surrounding the star is a bright yellow sun with 35 equal rays. This represents El Paso's nickname of "The Sun City", as the sun shines about 302 days a year on average. The sun is on a maroon (officially "red-purple") field, representing fellowship, warmth, and shelter. A narrow white border encircles the field. This is also the inner border of a maroon ring. Green olive leaves occupy the left and right sides of this ring, with the green meaning hope, good fortune, fertile land, and vitality. A wide heraldic ribbon is above the ring, with a white front and maroon back. On the ribbon is the text "CITY OF EL PASO" in maroon capital Arial-type font. A shorter ribbon of the same style is on the bottom of the flag, this time with the word "TEXAS". Connecting these ribbons is a thin white border, forming the outer edge of the olive leaf ring. The white within the emblem represents purity. The emblem is centered on a blue field, which represents sincerity. In terms of measurements, the total flag's proportions are 3 by 5. The drawing accompanying the official ordinance recognizing the adoption of the flag described the emblem as positioned 17 inches from the hoist and fly sides and 6 inches from the top and bottom. The emblem measures 26 inches horizontally and 24 inches vertically.

== History ==
The emblem on the flag was created around 1880, and was enclosed in a cornerstone at the old El Paso City Hall in 1899. The old city hall was demolished in 1958 to clear space for a new building, and the emblem was recovered.

=== First flag ===
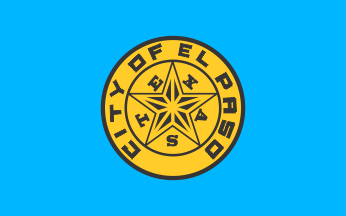
First flag of El Paso, using the correct seal in the center

Crest used on the flag, now the current seal of El Paso

The city first adopted a flag on June 17, 1948. The specification of its design was as follows:

Now therefore, be it resolved that the official flag of the city of El Paso shall be a light blue field with the seal of the City in gold in or near the center thereof.

The flag was manufactured in a 5:8 ratio. The manufacturer, however, did not use the official city seal on the flag. They instead used a modified version of Texas' state seal, replacing "THE STATE OF TEXAS" with "THE CITY OF EL PASO". This emblem was used often on city documents, officially known as the city crest prior to the adoption of the flag. It wasn't until 1960 when the Girl Scouts noticed this discrepancy, as they were looking to embroider a new flag. It appears that the crest used on the flag is now the current seal of El Paso. With the adoption of a new flag 2 years later the issue was noticed, the first flag of El Paso was technically never used.

=== Second flag ===
Following the Girl Scouts' discovery, the city administration decided to redesign the flag, which would be more authentic historically. The city planning department designed the flag and it was officially adopted on March 29, 1962. A 2004 North American Vexillological Association survey of 150 American city flags ranked El Paso's flag 91st. Out of Texas city flags in the same survey, the flag ranked 11th out of 12. Only the flag of Lubbock ranked lower, a design which has since been changed. A 2015 El Paso Times opinion piece called on the city to redesign the flag, even providing an alternative, with the yellow sun centered on a blue field, with a blue five-pointed star in the middle.
