= Flag of Vendée =

- Use: Civil
- Adopted: 18 September 1989
- Design: Vertically divided red-white, with the logo of Vendée in the center.
- Designed by: Michel Disle
- Use: Flag of departmental council.

The flag of the department of Vendée was created on 18 September 1989 by French designer Michel Disle.

== Overview ==
Coat of arms description: Argent two hearts voided and entwined surmounted by a crown voided and a crosslet all gules, a bordure gobony azure with or fleur-de-lis and gules with an or castle with three turrets.

The flag represents both the department and its citizens.

== History ==
Before the French Revolution, Vendée was part of the Poitou region and did not have its own coat of arms and flag. The Sacred Heart symbol began to be associated with Vendée with the outbreak of rebellion in 1793. The Sacred Heart was seen on rebels' patches more often than on banners. After passing the Infernal columns, the heart symbol was banned or promoted depending on the political climate. The coat of arms was created in the first half of the 20th century, it contains a double Sacred Heart on sliver shield and a frame composed of an alternating blue rectangle with gold fleur-de-lis, symbol of France and red rectangle with gold castle, symbol of Poitou. Then a crown was added to the symbol, which had not been there before. The banner of arms defends this coat has become an unofficial flag of Vendée. The Sacred Heart has become the basis of the modern logo in 1989. Most French departments place their logo as the centerpiece of their flag. The flags thus created usually did not gain popularity, but Vendée is an exception. In March 1999, the association Une Vendée pour tous les Vendéens sued the General Council, arguing that the cross surmounting the double heart made of the logo as a religious symbol, in contradiction with State secularity, which has been established in France in 1905. The Court of Nantes, however, rejected the claim, stating that "the logo does not refer to religion but to history [...]". In 2015 also was created the Viking flag of Vendée. The flag represents the Viking history of Vendée, recalling the Viking establishments in Noirmoutier, Yeu, Bouin, the Olonne marshes.

== Gallery ==
Traditional flag of Poitou

Type of Catholic and Royal Army of Vendée flag.

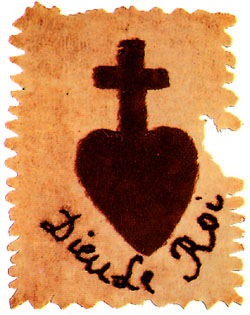
Sacred Heart patch.

The Vendée coat of arms.

Traditional flag.

Viking flag of Vendée.
