= Sri Lankan provincial flags =

This is a list of the flags of the provinces of Sri Lanka. Provincial flags for the modern provinces of Sri Lanka were first introduced in 1987, and 1988 for the North Eastern Province, which was at the time one entity. In 2007 with the separation of the North Eastern Province, into the Northern and the Eastern provinces, two new flags were adopted.

Most of the flags are based upon ancient Sinhalese flags, and or symbols for their respective regions.

== Current provincial flags ==
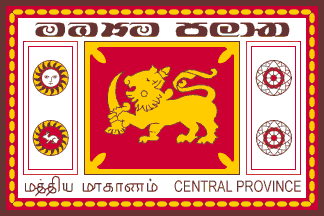
Flag of Central Province
(1987–present)

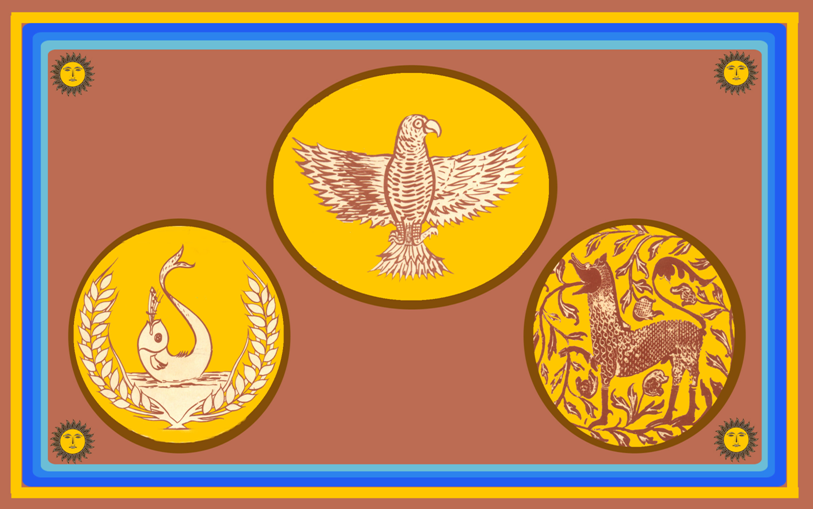
Flag of Eastern Province
(22 May 2007–present)

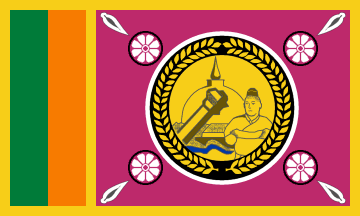
Flag of North Central Province
(1987–present)

Flag of Northern Province
(22 May 2007–present)

Flag of North Western Province
(1987–present)

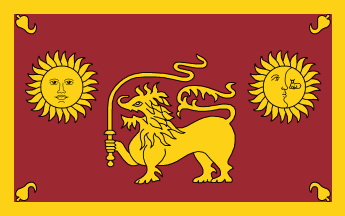
Flag of Sabaragamuwa Province
(1987–present)

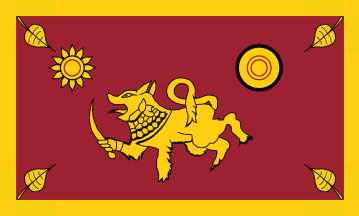
Flag of Southern Province
(1987–present)

Flag of Uva Province
(1987–present)

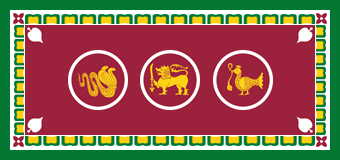
Flag of Western Province
(1987–present)

== Historic provincial flags ==
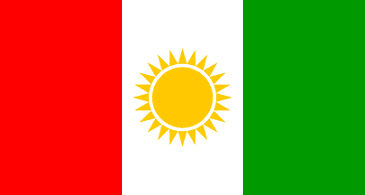
Flag of North Eastern Province
(1988–2007)

== See also ==
- List of Sri Lankan flags
