= List of country subdivision flags in Asia =

This page lists the country subdivision flags in Asia. It is a part of the Lists of country subdivision flags, which is split into continents due to its size.

== Bahrain ==
=== Governorates ===
Flag	Date	Use	Description
	2002–present	Flag of the Capital Governorate	A white field with the emblem of the Capital Governorate in the center.
	2002–present	Flag of the Muharraq Governorate	A white field with the emblem of the Muharraq Governorate in the center.
	2002–present	Flag of the Southern Governorate	A white field with the emblem of the Southern Governorate in the center.
	2002–present	Flag of the Northern Governorate	A white field with the emblem of the Northern Governorate in the center.
	2002–2014	Flag of the Central Governorate	A white field with the emblem of the Central Governorate in the center.

== China ==
All Chinese provinces – except the two special administrative regions (SARs) of Hong Kong and Macau – were not allowed to adopt their own province flag due to an order passed by CCP Central Committee General Office and General Office of the State Council.

=== Special Administrative Regions ===
Flag	Date	Use	Description
	1997 –	Flag of Hong Kong	A stylised, white, five-petal Bauhinia blakeana flower in the centre of a red field
	1999 –	Flag of Macau	Peacock green field with a lotus flower above the stylised Governor Nobre de Carvalho Bridge and water in white, beneath an arc of five golden five-pointed stars, where the large star is in the center flanked by four smaller stars, two on each side of the large star.

== East Timor ==
=== Municipalities ===
Flag	Date	Use	Description
		Flag of Baucau	
		Flag of Oecusse	

== Georgia ==
Flag	Date	Use	Description
	1992 –	Flag of Abkhazia	Seven horizontal stripes alternating green and white; in the canton, a white open hand below a semicircle of seven five-pointed stars on a red field.
	2004 –	Flag of Adjara	Seven horizontal stripes alternating blue and white; in the canton, the national flag of Georgia.

== Indonesia ==
=== Provinces ===
Flag	Date	Use	Description
		Flag of Aceh	
		Flag of Bali	
		Flag of Bangka Belitung Islands	
		Flag of Banten	
		Flag of Bengkulu	
		Flag of Central Java	
		Flag of Central Kalimantan	
		Flag of Central Papua	
		Flag of Central Sulawesi	
		Flag of East Java	
		Flag of East Kalimantan	
		Flag of East Nusa Tenggara	
		Flag of Gorontalo	
		Flag of Highland Papua	
		Flag of Special Capital Region of Jakarta	
		Flag of Jambi	
		Flag of Lampung	
		Flag of Maluku	
		Flag of North Kalimantan	
		Flag of North Maluku	
		Flag of North Sulawesi	
		Flag of North Sumatra	
		Flag of Papua	
		Flag of Riau	
		Flag of Riau Islands	
		Flag of Southeast Sulawesi	
		Flag of South Kalimantan	
		Flag of South Papua	
		Flag of South Sulawesi	
		Flag of South Sumatra	
		Flag of Southwest Papua	
		Flag of West Java	
		Flag of West Kalimantan	
		Flag of West Nusa Tenggara	
		Flag of West Papua	
		Flag of West Sulawesi	
		Flag of West Sumatra	
		Flag of Special Region of Yogyakarta	

== Iraq ==
=== Autonomous Regions ===
Flag	Date	Use	Description
	1921 –	Flag of Kurdistan	The flag of Kurdistan is a red-white-green tricolour with a yellow sun in the centre.

=== Governorates ===
Flag	Date	Ratio	Use	Description
	?–present	2:3	Flag of Al Anbar Governorate	
	?–present	2:3	Flag of Babil Governorate	
	?–present	2:3	Flag of Baghdad Governorate	
	?–present	2:3	Flag of Basra Governorate	
	?–?	2:3	Former flag of Basra Governorate	
	?–present	2:3	Flag of Diyala Governorate	
	?–present	2:3	Flag of Halabja Governorate	
	?–present	2:3	Flag of Muthanna Governorate	
	?–present	2:3	Flag of Nineveh Governorate	White flag charged with the emblem of the governorate. The emblem depicts the leaning minaret of the Great Mosque of al-Nuri, Mosul surrounded by olive branches.
	?–present	2:3	Flag of Saladin Governorate	
	2025 –present	2:3	Flag of Kirkuk Governorate	
	?–present	1:2	Flag of Sulaymaniyah Governorate	
	?–present	2:3	Flag of Wasit Governorate	

== Kazakhstan ==
=== Cities with special status ===
Flag	Date	Use	Description
		Flag of Almaty	
		Flag of Astana	
		Flag of Baikonur	

=== Regions ===
Flag	Date	Use	Description
		Flag of Almaty Region	
		Flag of Karaganda Region	

=== Districts ===
Flag	Date	Use	Description
		Flag of Akkol District	
		Flag of Medeu District	
		Flag of Uzunkol District	

== North Korea ==
=== Special administrative regions ===
Flag	Date	Use	Description
	2001–2002	Flag of proposed Sinuiju Special Administrative Region	Aquamarine flag with a white Magnolia, in 3:2 ratio.

== South Korea ==
=== Provinces ===
Flag	Date	Name	Geocode	Use
	1996–present	Seoul Special City	KR-11	Flag of Seoul
	2012–present	Sejong Special Self-Governing City	KR-50	Flag of Sejong City
	2023–present	Busan Metropolitan City	KR-26	Flag of Busan
	2001–present	Daegu Metropolitan City	KR-27	Flag of Daegu
	1996–present	Incheon Metropolitan City	KR-28	Flag of Incheon
	2000–present	Gwangju Metropolitan City	KR-29	Flag of Gwangju
	1995–present	Daejeon Metropolitan City	KR-30	Flag of Daejeon
	1997–present	Ulsan Metropolitan City	KR-31	Flag of Ulsan
	2021–present	Gyeonggi Province	KR-41	Flag of Gyeonggi Province
	2023–present	Gangwon State	KR-42	Flag of Gangwon State
	2023–present	North Chungcheong Province	KR-43	Flag of North Chungcheong Province
	2012–present	South Chungcheong Province	KR-44	Flag of South Chungcheong Province
	2024–present	Jeonbuk State	KR-45	Flag of Jeonbuk State
	2016–present	South Jeolla Province	KR-46	Flag of South Jeolla Province
	1997–present	North Gyeongsang Province	KR-47	Flag of North Gyeongsang Province
	1999–present	South Gyeongsang Province	KR-48	Flag of South Gyeongsang Province
	2009–present	Jeju Special Self-Governing Province	KR-49	Flag of Jeju Special Self-Governing Province

== Kyrgyzstan ==
=== Regions ===
Flag	Date	Use	Description
	1999–present	Flag of Batken	
	1992–present	Flag of Bishkek (independent city)	
	1992–present	Flag of Chüy	
	1992–present	Flag of Jalal-Abad	
	1992–present	Flag of Issyk-Kul	
	1992–present	Flag of Naryn	
	1992–present	Flag of Osh	
	1992–present	Flag of Talas	

== Malaysia ==
=== States ===
Flag	Date (century)	Use	Description
	1912 on	Flag of the state of Kedah.	A red field with the state coat of arms in the canton.
	1923 on	Flag of the state of Kelantan.	A red field defaced with a white crescent and star and two white kris and spears.
	1871 on	Flag of the state of Johor.	A blue field with an arranged crescent and five-pointed stars in a red canton.
	1957 on	Flag of the state of Malacca.	Two equal bands of red and white, with a crescent and five-pointed star in a blue canton.
	1895 on	Flag of the state of Negeri Sembilan.	A yellow field with two diagonal bands of red and black in the canton.
	1903 on	Flag of the state of Pahang.	Two equal horizontal bands of white and black.
	1965 on	Flag of the state of Penang.	A blue, white and yellow vertical tri-colour defaced with a betel nut tree.
	1869 on	Flag of the state of Perak.	A white, yellow and black horizontal tri-colour.
	1870 on	Flag of the state of Perlis.	Two equal horizontal bands of yellow and blue.
	1988 on	Flag of the state of Sabah.	A blue (top), white, and red tri-colour, with the silhouette of Mount Kinabalu on a light blue canton.
	1988 on	Flag of the state of Sarawak. (Ibu Pertiwi)	A yellow field with two diagonal bands of red (top) and black, defaced with a nine-pointed star.
	1965 on	Flag of the state of Selangor.	Red and yellow quartered, with a white crescent and five-pointed stars in the canton.
	1953 on	Flag of the state of Terengganu.	A black field defaced with a white crescent and five-pointed star, with white at the edge.

== Mongolia ==
=== Provinces ===
Flag	Date	Use	Description
		Flag of Ulaanbaatar	A sky blue background and the Garuda bird in the center
		Flag of Arkhangai Province	A light blue background and the emblem in the left
		Flag of Bayankhongor Province	
		Flag of Bayan-Ölgii Province	Three colors in vertical 2 blue and 1 green and a yellow crescent
		Flag of Bulgan Province	A green background and province emblem in the center.
		Flag of Darkhan-Uul Province	
		Flag of Dornod Province	
		Flag of Dornogovi Province	
		Flag of DundGobi Province	
		Flag of Govi-Altai Province	
		Flag of Govisümber Province	
		Flag of Khentii Province	
		Flag of Khovd Province	
		Flag of Khövsgöl Province	
		Flag of Orkhon Province	
		Flag of Selenge Province	
		Flag of Sükhbaatar Province	
		Flag of Töv Province	
		Flag of Ömnögovi Province	
		Flag of Uvs Province	
		Flag of Övörkhangai Province	
		Flag of Zavkhan Province	

== Myanmar ==
=== States ===
Flag	Date	Use	Description
	1986	Flag of Chin State	Hornbill on a branch within a white circle surrounded by 9 white stars atop a blue-red-green horizontal triband
	2010	Flag of Kachin State	Blue circle with white mountains defaced with Manaw poles on a green field
	2010	Flag of Kayah State	A Kinnara centred on a red-blue-green horizontal triband
		Flag of Kayin State	Blue-white-red horizontal triband with a white star inset on top-left of blue band
	8 June 2018	Flag of Mon State	Yellow Hamsa on a red field
		Flag of Rakhine State	Emblem of Rakhine, a Shrivatsa, on a blue disk in the centre of a white-red horizontal bicolour
	12 February 1947	Flag of Shan State	White circle, representing the moon, on a yellow-green-red horizontal triband

=== Regions ===
Flag	Date	Use	Description
	2022	Flag of Ayeyarwady Region	Seal of Ayeyarwady Region on a blue field
	c. 2018	Flag of Bago Region	Female hamsa perched on a male hamsa within a white circle bordered in green on a dark blue field. The text ပဲခူးတိုင်းဒေသကြီး ("Bago Region") is above the birds.
	2021	Flag of Magway Region	Seal of Magway Region on a yellow field with the text မကွေးတိုင်းဒေသကြီး ("Magway Region") above the seal in green.
	2022	Flag of Mandalay Region	Seal of Mandalay Region on a red field
	30 September 2019	Flag of Sagaing Region	Seal of Sagaing Region centred on a yellow-blue-red horizontal triband with the text စစ်ကိုင်းတိုင်းဒေသကြီး ("Sagaing Region") above the seal within the yellow band.
order	2010	Flag of Tanintharyi Region	Naga facing forward with a white star above on a red-blue-green horizontal triband
	2022	Flag of Yangon Region	Inner portion of the Seal of Yangon Region centred on a yellow-green-red horizontal triband with the text ရန်ကုန်တိုင်းဒေသကြီးအစိုးရအဖွဲ့ ("Yangon Region Government Group") on a white banner below the seal.

=== Union territory ===
Flag	Date	Use	Description
		Flag of the Naypyidaw Union Territory	Seal of the Naypyidaw Union Territory on a teal-blue field

=== Self-administered zones and divisions ===
==== Self-administered zones ====
Flag	Date	Use	Description
	2017	Flag of the Danu Self-Administered Zone	Blue over yellow bicolour with a green disc at the centre charged with a white flower
		Flag of the Kokang Self-Administered Zone	Blue-red-green horizontal triband charged with a white star and 8 white circular rings forming an arc above the star.
		Flag of the Naga Self-Administered Zone	White over red bicolour with a green square in the upper hoist charged with two crossed spears and a tribal headdress
		Flag of the Pa Laung Self-Administered Zone	Red circle on a light blue-yellow-green horizontal triband.
	1955	Flag of the Pa'O Self-Administered Zone	White star within a blue canton on a red-green horizontal bicolour

==== Self-administered divisions ====
Flag	Date	Use	Description
		Flag of the Wa Self-Administered Division	There is no official flag, the flag of Myanmar is used

== Pakistan ==
=== Provinces ===
Flag	Date	Use	Description
	2005–Present	Flag of Sindh	A traditional green flag, with the provincial emblem in the centre.
	1970–Present	Flag of Punjab	A traditional green flag, with the provincial emblem in the centre. The emblem reflects Punjab's natural resources: its wheat, and the five rivers which give the province its name in Persian (from Punj = Five, Aab = Waters).
	2011–Present	Khyber Pakhtunkhwa	A traditional green flag, with the provincial emblem on the flag shows the Jamrud fort which guards the Khyber Pass, and mountains in the back.
	2011–Present	Gilgit–Baltistan	A traditional green flag, with the provincial emblem on the flag showing the Baltit Fort and the Skardu Fort which guards the Himalayas (including K2), the designated national peak in the back.
	?–Present	Baloch	A traditional green flag, with the provincial emblem in the centre. The emblem shows stylised mountains of this barren province and the principal mode of transport: the Dromedary camel, also the provincial animal of Balochistan.
	1975–Present	Flag of Azad Kashmir	The flag displays the Pakistani national colours, white and dark green, with a crescent and star to represent the Muslim majority, and a saffron square to represent the Buddhist, Hindu, Sikh and other minorities of the disputed region, the colours are clearly influenced by the Mughal Empire. The four white stripes symbolise the main rivers of the Kashmir region; Indus, Jhelum, Chenab and Ravi. It also represents the five geographic divisions of the disputed territory, Baltistan, Gilgit, Jammu, the Kashmir Valley and Ladakh.
	2011–2018	Federally Administered Tribal Areas	A traditional green flag, with the provincial emblem in the centre. The emblem shows a castle and two swords. Underneath it are the letters FATA – abbreviation of the province.
	1901–1955 1970–2010	North-West Frontier Province	A traditional green flag, with the provincial emblem in the centre. The emblem shows a castle and a crescent moon. Underneath it are the letters NWFP - abbreviation of the province.

== Philippines ==
=== Autonomous regions ===
Flag	Date	Use	Description
	2019 –	Flag of Bangsamoro	The flag of Bangsamoro is a horizontal tricolor of green, white and red with the yellow seven-pointed star surrounded by a yellow crescent both centered on the white band and a white kris centered on the red band.

== Russia ==
Flag	Date	Use	Description
	2000 –	Flag of Altai Krai	
	1992 –	Flag of the Altai Republic	
	1999 –	Flag of Amur Oblast	
	1992 –	Flag of the Republic of Buryatia	
	2001 –	Flag of Chelyabinsk Oblast	
	1997 –	Flag of Chukotka Autonomous Okrug	
	1997 –	Flag of Irkutsk Oblast	
	2005 –	Flag of the Jewish Autonomous Oblast	
	2010 –	Flag of Kamchatka Krai	
	1994 –	Flag of Khabarovsk Krai	
	2003 –	Flag of the Republic of Khakassia	
	1995 –	Flag of Khanty–Mansi Autonomous Okrug	
	2000 –	Flag of Krasnoyarsk Krai	
	1997 –	Flag of Kurgan Oblast	
	2001 –	Flag of Magadan Oblast	
	2009 –	Flag of Nenets Autonomous Okrug	
	2014 –	Flag of Omsk Oblast	
	2011 –	Flag of Perm Krai	
	1995 –	Flag of Primorsky Krai	
	1992 –	Flag of the Sakha Republic	
	1995 –	Flag of Sakhalin Oblast	
	1997 –	Flag of Sverdlovsk Oblast	
	1992 –	Flag of the Tuva Republic	
	1995 –	Flag of Tyumen Oblast	
	1996 –	Flag of Yamalo-Nenets Autonomous Okrug	
	1995 –	Flag of Zabaykalsky Krai	

== Sri Lanka ==
=== Provinces ===
Flag	Date	Use	Description
	November 14, 1987 –	Flag of Central Province	The flag is designed to represents the Central Province and its three districts Kandy, Matale and Nuwaraeliya. The Golden colour Lion that carries a sword and the four Bo leaves at the four corners in the maroon colour background represents the Kandy District. The white layout represents Matale District and Nuwaraeiya District which represents the Upcountry is symbolised by the white lotus. The Sun and Moon are for Eternity.
	January 1, 2007 –	Flag of Eastern Province	
	November 14, 1987 –	Flag of North Central Province	
	November 14, 1987 – December 31, 2006	Flag of North Eastern Province	Was adapted as the Flag of the North Province after the demerger of the North-Eastern Province
	January 1, 2007 –	Flag of Northern Province	Blue border – ocean resource; Green – the greenery and agriculture; Red – labour, industriousness and Hindu culture, religion; White – fraternity, peace; Radiating sun indicates synergy of power and natural energy source, also Tamil people and language in the Province
	November 14, 1987 –	Flag of North Western Province	It features a brown bovine with a sun and moon symbol on a white background. There are 15 small eight-pointed cross-stars in the background, and a green and brown woven border surrounds the whole.
	November 14, 1987 –	Flag of Sabaragamuwa Province	
	November 14, 1987 –	Flag of Southern Province	A picture of a lion flag can be seen in frescos in historical Dambulla cave temple. This historical flag made of carving a picture of a running lion with a small sword in its forepaw is considered to be the Ruhuna flag. Furthermore, King Dutugamunu left the Magam Kingdom with the lion flag ahead for the battle to unite the country. The flag is a picture of a yellow lion on a red blood colour background. Accordingly, it was decided to use for the Southern Provincial flag the picture of the lion running with a small sword (iluk koolaya) in its forepaw of the Ruhuna flag and the red colour and yellow colour of the flag taken on the war front by King Dutugamunu. It was decided to use the same for the Southern Province flag mixture of colours and the standard to represent all communities in Galle, Matara, and Hambantota and four bo leaves (Metta, Karuna, Muditha, Upeksha) of the national flag. It was agreed that the forms of the sun and moon of the flag of Southern Province flag should be in the same forms as the sun and moon of the flag of Devinuwara Devalaya and that the same form that of the flag of Hambantota District. Accordingly, it was expected to keep the integration of Galle, matara and Hambantota. Therefore, the Southern Province flag can be considered a combination of several traditional flags. The small sword (iluk Koolaya) is the symbol of control, but it does not reflect terror or suppression. The small sword represents Justice and fairness. Running lion represents velocity fearlessness and pride. The sun and moon stand for stability prosperity and augustness. It expresses the traditional saying "Until the sun and moon exists". The sun and moon of the flag are considered to be symbols of victory. The combination of colours around the flag depicts the existence of Southern Sri Lanka, victorious war history, religion and patriotism, mutual cooperation and harmony
	November 14, 1987 –	Flag of Uva Province	In the days of the Sinhala kings, Sri Lanka had been divided into twelve provinces and ruled and each of these twelve provinces had been allotted a flag. Accordingly, in order to bring about qualities such as pleasantness, innocence, greatness and royalty, a flag with a picture of swan had been allotted to the Uva Province. The flag that was gifted to Uva Province by the King Sri Wickrama Rajasinghe who ruled the kingdom of Kandy during the period 1798–1815 can be seen even today at the National Museum ( Courtesy: Book entitled “Uva Ithihasaya” by Panditha Naulle Dhammananda Thero )
	November 14, 1987 –	Flag of Western Province	

== Taiwan ==
Below are the flags used in the political divisions of Taiwan.

=== Provinces ===
Flag	Duration	Use	Description
		Taiwan Province	

=== Special municipalities ===
Flag	Duration	Use	Description
	2009–Present	Kaohsiung City 高雄市	Stylized "高". Colors symbolizing sunshine, vitality, environmental protection, & ocean.
	2009–Present	New Taipei City 新北市	Highly stylized "北" in the form of four hearts arranged to resemble a four-leaf clover.
	2009–Present	Tainan City	
	2009–Present	Taipei City	
	2014–Present	Taoyuan City	

=== Provincial cities ===
Flag	Duration	Use	Description
		Chiayi City	
		Keelung City	

=== Counties ===
Flag	Duration	Use	Description
		Changhua County	
		Chiayi County	
		Hsinchu County	
		Hualien County	
		Kinmen County	
		Lienchiang County	
		Miaoli County	
		Nantou County	
		Penghu County	
		Pingtung County	
		Taitung County	
		Yilan County	
		Yunlin County	

== Thailand ==
Flag	Date	Use	Description
	1993–present	Flag of Amnat Charoen Province	Purple field. In the center of the flag is the provincial seal, featuring Phra Mongkol Ming Mueang, a revered Buddha statue significant to the province.
		Flag of Ang Thong Province	Bicolor flag with yellow on the top half and green on the bottom half. In the center of the flag is the provincial seal.
		Flag of Bangkok	Green flag with the Seal of the Bangkok Metropolitan, in white at the center. Used by the Bangkok Metropolitan Administration and the Governor of Bangkok.
	2011–present	Flag of Bueng Kan Province	Rectangular flag consisting of three horizontal stripes in the proportions of purple, white, and purple. In the center of the flag is the provincial seal.
		Flag of Buriram Province	Purple and orange flag split in half vertically with the purple on the left and the orange on the right with the provincial seal in the center.
	2007–present	Flag of Chachoengsao Province	Rectangular field of dark red (maroon.) In the center of the flag is the provincial seal, which depicts Wat Sothonwararam
		Flag of Chai Nat Province	Provincial seal set against a magenta background, which is the symbolic color of the province.
		Flag of Chaiyaphum Province	Horizontal stripes in brown, orange, and brown. In the center of the flag is the provincial seal, depicting the "Thong Sam Chai," an ancient victory flag of the army.
		Flag of Chanthaburi Province	A red field. In the center of the flag is the provincial seal, with the text "จังหวัดจันทบุรี" (Chanthaburi Province) displayed below the seal.
		Flag of Chiang Mai Province	Rectangular flag with a blue field. In the center of the flag is the provincial seal, which features a white elephant standing within a traditional Thai ornate structure "Ruen Kaew."
		Flag of Chiang Rai Province	Rectangular flag with vertical stripes in blue, purple, and blue. The central purple stripe features a white elephant and a text banner displaying the province's name.
		Flag of Chonburi Province	Rectangular flag with horizontal stripes in dark red, yellow, and dark red. In the center of the flag is provincial seal consisting of Kao Sam Muk and the sea.
		Flag of Chumphon Province	Blue field. In the center of the flag is the provincial seal, which depicts a goddess standing in a blessing gesture in front of a fort, flanked by two fig trees.
		Flag of Kalasin Province	Horizontal stripes in green, orange, and green. In the center of the flag is the provincial seal, which is a circular emblem containing images of grass, a black water pond (symbolizing the name "Kalasin"), mountains, and rain clouds. Below features a white text that reads "จังหวัดกาฬสินธุ์" (Kalasin Province) in a semi-circular arc.
		Flag of Kamphaeng Phet Province	Rectangular flag with three horizontal stripes. The top stripe is yellow, the middle stripe is red, and the bottom stripe is leaf green. In the center of the red stripe is the provincial seal.
		Flag of Kanchanaburi Province	A blue flag with the central area in vermillion colour and the provincial seal in the center.
		Flag of Khon Kaen Province	Maroon field. In the center of the flag is the provincial emblem, which depicts a stupa (Phra That Kham Kaen) built on a tree stump.
		Flags of Krabi Province	Currently, the flags of Krabi Province have two variants.: Two horizontal stripes. The top stripe is yellow, and the bottom stripe is blue. In the center of the flag is the provincial seal. (The most commonly used one); Yellow field. In the center of the flag is the provincial seal.
		Flag of Lampang Province	Rectangular flag with a green field. In the center of the flag is the provincial seal, which features a white rooster standing within a mandapa structure of Wat Phra That Lampang Luang.
		Flag of Lamphun Province	Rectangular flag with a blue field. In the center of the flag is the provincial seal, which features Phra That Hariphunchai. Below the emblem is the text "จังหวัดลำพูน" (Lamphun Province).
		Flag of Loei Province	Rectangular flag with a blue field. In the center of the flag is the provincial emblem, which features Phra That Si Song Rak within a circle. Below the emblem is the text "จังหวัดเลย" (Loei Province).
		Flag of Lopburi Province	Horizontal stripes in blue, white, and blue. In the center of the flag is the provincial emblem, which depicts the four-armed Narai standing in front of Phra Prang Sam Yot.
		Flag of Mae Hong Son Province	Rectangular flag divided horizontally into three equal parts: brown, blue, and brown. In the center of the blue stripe is the provincial seal within a red circle.
		Flag of Maha Sarakham Province	Yellow field with a brown stripe running horizontally through the center. Within the brown stripe is the provincial seal.
		Flag of Mukdahan Province	White field, with red borders on three sides (except for the side attached to the flagpole.) In the center of the flag is the provincial seal.
		Flag of Nakhon Nayok Province	Green field. In the center of the flag is the provincial seal, which depicts an elephant holding a sheaf of rice. Below the emblem is a yellow ribbon with the text "นครนายก" (Nakhon Nayok Province).
		Flag of Nakhon Pathom Province	Blue field. In the center of the flag is the provincial seal, which depicts Phra Pathom Chedi. The emblem is adorned with the Thai numeral "4" within the Great Crown of Victory. Below the emblem is the text "นครปฐม" (Nakhon Pathom Province) in white.
		Flag of Nakhon Phanom Province	Rectangular flag divided horizontally into two stripes. The top stripe is red and the bottom stripe is black. In the center of the flag is the provincial seal, which features Phra That Phanom.
		Flag of Nakhon Ratchasima Province	Orange field. In the center of the flag is the provincial seal, which depicts the monument of Thao Suranari in front of the Chumphon Gate.
		Flag of Nakhon Sawan Province	Blue field. In the center of the flag is the provincial seal, which features an image of a three-spired vimana.
		Flag of Nakhon Si Thammarat Province	Rectangular flag divided horizontally into two stripes. Purple on the top and yellow on the bottom. In the center of the flag is the provincial seal, which features Phra Borommathat Chedi of Wat Phra Mahathat Woramahawihan, surrounded by the symbols of the twelve zodiac signs.
		Flag of Nan Province	Rectangular flag divided horizontally into two stripes. Purple on the top and yellow on the bottom. In the center of the flag is the provincial seal, which features Phra That Chae Haeng on top of Usuparatch
		Flag of Narathiwat Province	Yellow square at the hoist. Within the yellow square is the provincial seal, which features an image of a Kolae boat with a fully unfurled sail. On the sail is an image of a white elephant adorned with royal regalia, representing Phra Sri Nararatt Rajakarini, an important elephant presented to King Bhumibol Adulyadej by Narathiwat Province in 1977. The remaining part of the flag consists of seven horizontal stripes in alternating red and white, with four red stripes and three white stripes.
	1993–present	Flag of Nong Bua Lamphu Province	White field. In the center of the flag is the provincial seal, which depicts a statue of King Naresuan standing in front of a shrine. In the background is Nong Bua Lamphu Lake. Below the emblem, there is a ribbon tied in a knot at both ends, with the text "จังหวัดหนองบัวลำภู" (Nong Bua Lamphu Province) inside.
		Flag of Nong Khai Province	Horizontal stripes in black, red, and black. In the center of the flag is the provincial seal, which features an image of bamboo clumps by a pond.
		Flag of Nonthaburi Province	Vertical stripes in purple and blue. In the center of the flag is the provincial seal, which features an intricately decorated earthenware pot. Symbolized the long-standing pottery-making tradition of the people of Nonthaburi Province.
		Flag of Pathum Thani Province	Vertical stripes in blue and white. In the center of the flag is the provincial seal, which features a lotus flower and a pair of rice sheaf rising above the water.
		Flag of Pattani Province	Rectangular flag divided horizontally into two stripes. yellow on the top and green on the bottom. In the center of the flag is an image of the Phaya Tani cannon.
		Flag of Phang Nga Province	Rectangular flag with vertical stripes in blue, yellow, and pink. In the center of the flag is the provincial seal, which features an image of a mining dredge, Khao Tapu, and Khao Chang.
		Flag of Phatthalung Province	Horizontal stripes in yellow, purple, and yellow. In the center of the flag is the provincial seal, which features an image of Khao Ok Thalu.
		Flag of Phayao Province	Magenta field. In the center of the flag is the provincial seal.
		Flag of Phetchabun Province	Horizontal stripes in green, white, and green. In the center of the flag is the provincial seal.
		Flag of Phetchaburi Province	Rectangular flag with blue, yellow, and blue horizontal stripes. In the center of the yellow stripe is the provincial seal, which features an image of a rice field, sugar palm trees, and Phra Nakhon Khiri within a circular frame.
		Flag of Phichit Province	Rectangular flag divided into five stripes, three dark green stripes alternating with two white stripes. In the center of the flag is the provincial seal.
		Flag of Phitsanulok Province	Purple field. In the center of the flag is the provincial seal, which depicts Phra Buddha Chinaraj within a circular frame adorned with Thai decorative patterns.
		Flag of Phrae Province	Vertical stripes in Green and red. In the center of the flag is the provincial seal, which features an image of Phra That Cho Hae stupa placed on the back of a horse.
		Flag of Phra Nakhon Si Ayutthaya Province	Rectangular flag with vertical stripes in blue, light blue, and blue. In the center of the flag is the provincial seal, which features a conch shell on the pedestal tray in the pavilion under the Cordia dichotoma tree.
		Flag of Phuket Province	Light blue field. In the center of the flag is the provincial seal, which features the statue of Thao Thep Krasattri and Thao Si Sunthon.
		Flag of Prachin Buri Province	Red field at the hoist, which is designated as the regional color. In the center of the flag is the provincial seal, which features an image of a Bodhi tree within a circular frame, The fly end of the flag features a yellow stripe.
		Flag of Prachuap Khiri Khan Province	Yellow field. In the center of the flag is the provincial seal.
		Flag of Ranong Province	Green square at the hoist. Within the green square is the provincial emblem, which features an image of a castle on the clouds. The remaining part of the flag consists of seven horizontal stripes in alternating yellow and orange, with four yellow stripes and three orange stripes.
		Flag of Ratchaburi Province	Blue field. In the center of the flag is the provincial seal, which depicts regalia.
		Flag of Rayong Province	Rectangular flag with vertical stripes in red, yellow, and blue. In the center of the flag is the provincial seal, which features an image of a royal pavilion where King Chulalongkorn resided on Ko Samet.
	2002–present	Flag of Roi Et Province	Yellow field. In the center of the flag is the provincial seal.
	1993–present	Flag of Sa Kaeo Province	Rectangular flag divided horizontally into two stripes. yellow on the top and green on the bottom. In the center of the flag is the provincial seal.
		Flag of Sakon Nakhon Province	Rectangular flag divided horizontally into two stripes. blue on the top and yellow on the bottom. In the center of the flag is the provincial seal, which features an image of Wat Phra That Choeng Chum.
		Flag of Samut Prakan Province	Light blue field. In the center of the flag is the provincial seal.
		Flag of Samut Sakhon Province	Horizontal stripes in pink, light blue, and pink. In the center of the flag is the provincial seal.
		Flag of Samut Songkhram Province	Vertical stripes in blue, white, and blue. In the center of the flag is the provincial seal.
	2022–present	Flag of Saraburi Province	Horizontal stripes in red, white, and red. In the center of the flag is the provincial seal.
		Flag of Satun Province	Green field, with yellow borders on three sides (except for the side attached to the flagpole.) In the center of the flag is the provincial seal.
	2004–present	Flag of Sing Buri Province	Red field, in the center of the flag is the provincial seal, which features an image of a monument honoring the eleven leaders of Khai Bang Rachan
		Flag of Sisaket Province	Rectangular flag divided horizontally into two stripes. Orange on the top and white on the bottom. In the center of the flag is the provincial seal.
		Flag of Songkhla Province	Cyan d, in, the center of the flag features a conch shell on the pedestal trayy
		Flag of Sukhothai Province	Horizontal stripes in red, yellow, and green. In the upper left corner of the flag is the provincial seal.
		Flag of Suphan Buri Province	Horizontal stripes in blue, orange, and blue. In the center of the flag is the provincial seal. which depicts the elephant duel between Naresuan and Mingyi Swa
		Flag of Surat Thani Province	Rectangular flag divided horizontally into two stripes. Orange on the top and Yellow on the bottom. In the center of the flag is the provincial seal.
		Flag of Surin Province	Horizontal stripes in red, yellow, and green. In the center of the flag is the provincial seal.
		Flag of Tak Province	Purple and yellow flag with 7 stripes: 4 purple and 3 yellow. On the side next to the flagpole is a triangular blue field with the provincial seal, which features an image of Naresuanpouring water over the neck of an elephant.
		Flag of Trang Province	Horizontal stripes in light blue, white, and light blue. In the center of the flag is the provincial seal.
		Flag of Trat Province	Horizontal stripes in blue and red. In the center of the flag is the provincial seal.
		Flag of Ubon Ratchathani Province	Two horizontal stripes. The top of the flag has a pink lotus flower embroidered on a pink background. Below the flag is the white letter "อุบลราชธานี" (Ubon Ratchathani) embroidered on a green background.
		Flag of Udon Thani Province	Orange field. In the center of the flag is the provincial seal.
		Flag of Uthai Thani Province	Rectangular flag divided horizontally into two stripes. yellow on the top and green on the bottom. In the center of the flag is the provincial seal.
		Flag of Uttaradit Province	A rectangular flag with an orange background and two dark purple stripes intersecting in the shape of a cross. In the center is the provincial seal, featuring a stone throne covered by a yellow pavilion, flanked by dark blue scroll patterns. In front of the pavilion is a red Garuda, all enclosed within a circular frame with a 70-centimeter diameter. The name of the province is inscribed around the edge of the circle.
		Flag of Yala Province	Rectangular flag divided horizontally into two stripes. green on the top and white on the bottom. In the center of the flag is the provincial seal.
		Flag of Yasothon Province	Rectangular flag divided horizontally into two stripes. pink on the top and light blue on the bottom. In the center of the flag is the provincial seal.

== United Arab Emirates ==
=== Emirates ===
Flag	Date	Use	Description
	1820–present	Flag of Abu Dhabi	a red field with a white rectangle at the canton.
	1820–present	Flag of Ajman and Dubai	a red field with a white bar at the hoist.
	1952–1961	Flag of Fujairah	a red field with a white Arabic calligraphy in the center.
	1820–present	Flag of Ras Al Khaimah and Sharjah	a large red rectangle on a white field.
	1820–present	Flag of Umm Al Quwain	a red field with a white bar at the hoist and a large white star and crescent in the center.

== Uzbekistan ==
=== Autonomous republics ===
Flag	Date	Use	Description
	1992–	Flag of Karakalpakstan	Three equally horizontal bands of blue, yellow, and green separated by a narrow red and a narrower white band. On the hoist side of the flag, in the blue stripe, are a white crescent moon and five white stars.

== Yemen ==
The Federalization of Yemen or the Federal Republic of Yemen was the outcome of the National Dialogue Conference. The Dialogue members also agreed that Yemen would be transformed into a six-region federal system. The regions would be Azal in the North, and Saba in the center, and Tihama in the West, and Aden and Jand in the South, and Hadramawt in the East.

Flag	Date	Use	Description
		Flag of Aden Region	
		Flag of Azal Region	
		Flag of Hadhramaut Region	
		Flag of Janad Region	
		Flag of Sheba Region	
		Flag of Tahama Region	
