= Flags of the Kingdom of Kandy =

National flag

Flag of the Kingdom of Kandy

The Kingdom of Kandy used a variety of flags at both national and provincial level. The kingdom succeeded from the Kotte Kingdom in around 1469, continued the use of the heraldic emblems of Kotte and Sitawaka.

== National flags ==
Flag the Kingdom of Kandy
c. 1798–1815

== Royal flags ==
The royal family and their flags took pre-eminence over all.

=== House of Vimaladharmasuriya (1592–1739) ===
Crown Prince Kumārasiṃha Astana (1629–1634)

The flag of Crown Prince Kumārasiṃha Astana (1629–1634), 2nd son of Vimaladharmasuriya I and Kusumasana Devi, heir to the throne after the death of his older brother Maha Astana. This flag is a royal standard used by Kumārasiṃha and it was presented by him to the Meda Mahanuwara Rajamaha Viharaya to be carried in the Dalada procession when the sacred Tooth Relic was housed at the Meda Mahanuwara Temple.

Royal Standard of Prince Kumārasiṃha Astana

Photograph of the Royal Standard of Prince Kumārasiṃha Astana

Crown Prince Vijayapāla (1628–1654)

The Portuguese account of Vijayapala during his Holy Baptism and Royal Procession in Goa writes about his flag:

Emperor of Ceilao Vigiapala, King of Candia, Uva and Matale, lawful heir of and successor to that splendid Estate, is a Prince of great parts both natural and acquired ; for besides being graceful there can be seen in his stature and bearing the Majesty worthy of an Empire, which Fortune, ever jealous of the highest worth, has opposed. He is gifted with high courage and spirit as will appear from the enterprises in which he has figured, always to help the Portuguese, along with whom he has fought in those regions in the service of this Crown, of which he is a Vassal, and maintained with us throughout a loyal friendship which was never interrupted…

The Emperor came out of his Casa, there being borne before him a green banner (guiao) displaying an Imperial Eagle (Bherunda Pakshiya) embroidered in gold and encrusted with many and very costly precious stones on the one side.

— P.E. Pieris, The Prince Vijayapala of Ceylon, 1634-1654 (1927)

The flag of Crown Prince Vijayapāla (1628–1654), 3rd son of Vimaladharmasuriya I and Kusumasana Devi, heir to the throne after the death of his two older brothers, Maha Astana and Kumārasiṃha Astana. Following Kumārasiṃha’s death in 1634 and Senarat’s own death in 1635, Vijayapala entered a power struggle with his half-brother Rajasinha II, (the direct son of Senarat and Kusumasana Devi) for the Kandyan throne. He allied with the Portuguese and assisted them against the Dutch in 1641, hoping to gain military support. However, he was imprisoned and exiled by the Portuguese to Goa in 1643. In 1646, he converted to Roman Catholicism under the name Dom Teodósio, during which his green and gold Bherunda Pakshiya Royal Standard was used in his Holy Baptism and royal processions. He died in Goa in 1654 without claiming the Kandyan throne.

Royal Standard of Prince Vijayapāla

Vimaladharmasuriya II (1687–1707)

The flag of King Vimaladharmasuriya II (1687–1707), king of the Kingdom of Kandy and son and successor of Rajasinghe II. According to the Journal of the Ceylon Branch of the Royal Asiatic Society (1889–1890), the king's royal standard consisted of a white field bearing a red lion in the centre. This flag is described as a royal standard associated with Vimaladharmasuriya II during his reign. No surviving illustration of the flag has been identified.

=== Nayaks of Kandy (1739–1815) ===
Sri Rajadhi Rajasinha (1782–1798)

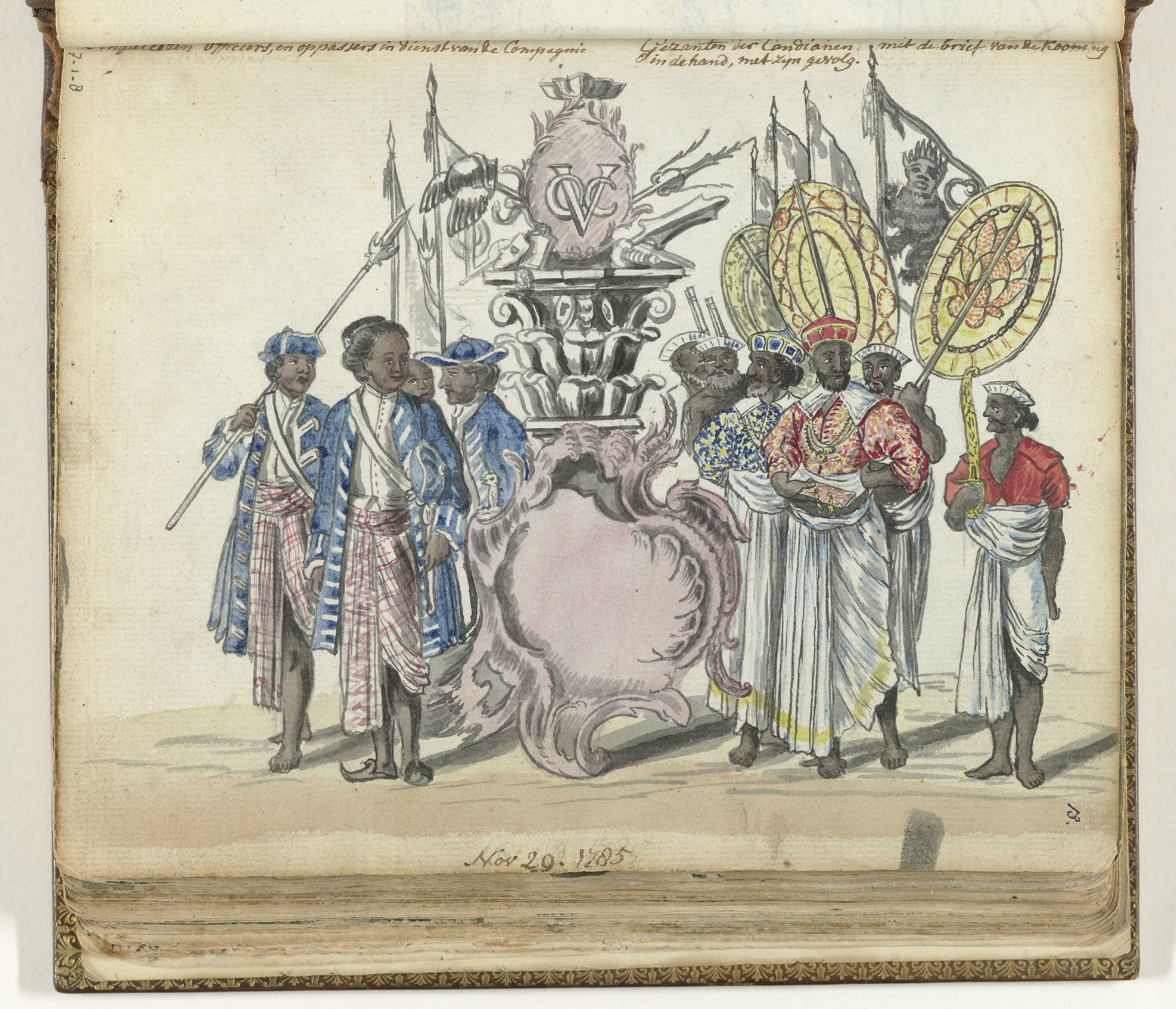
An earlier version of the Royal Standard carried by the envoys of the king to the Dutch Governor in 1785

Sri Vikrama Rajasinha (1798–1815)

Edward W. Perera writes about this flag:

By rare good fortune, as stated in the Introduction, the writer discovered three Sinhalese banners at the Chelsea Hospital in 1908, two of them being representations of the royal standard. The design on one of them was completely faded, but the identity of the flag was made clear by a drawing in water colour hung upon the wall- gu., a lion pass. or, holding in the dexter paw a chowry of the last...

The other was the banner of the last King of Kandy, Sri Wikkrama Rája Sinha (1798-1815), who surrendered in 1815 at the fall of Kandy. Together with the eagles of Napoleon, it was deposited at Whitehall Chapel, thence removed to the United Service Museum, and later to the Chelsea Hospital. This flag has since been renovated, and the emblem is clearly discernible, a lion passant holding a sword in its right paw, as described in the Malwatte manuscript. For the capture of Kandy, in 1815, Sir Robert Brownrigg, Bart, was granted by royal letters patent, as an honourable augmentation, the flag of the Kandyan monarch.

— Edward W. Perera, Sinhalese banners and standards (1916)

The flag of Sri Vikrama Rajasinha (1798–1815), the only flag of a Sri Lankan monarch so far known to be in existence. A fragment of a manuscript on flags in the library of the Malwathu Maha Viharaya records: "The Sinhalese royal standard: a banner bearing the device of a lion holding a sword in its right paw. This was the flag of Sri Vikrama Rajasinha, (1798-1815) who became the Sinhalese King." This flag was lost when it had been picked up from the battle ground at Hanwella Fort in 1803 by British Capt. William Pollock when Sri Vikrama Rajasinha and his forces had to retreat during the Battle of Hanwella of the First Kandyan War.

This flag was rediscovered in 1908 by E. W. Perera, along with two other Sinhalese flags, at the Royal Hospital Chelsea in London. At the time Perera found the flag, he had to repair it and prepare a sketch for publication as it was already in a very bad state of preservation and unsuitable for photography. In 1916 E. W. Perera reproduces a sketch of the flag, without colours, in plate No. 100 in his well-known monograph, Sinhalese Banners and Standards published in 1916.

This flag had been in possession of a doctor in Colombo until June 1990 with his sudden death his wife, a Swiss lady, left the island for permanent settlement in Switzerland taking the flag with her.

Senarath Panawatta, a former curator of the Kandy National Museum, later confirmed the authenticity of this flag as an original artifact. Panawatta identified it as the civil standard of the Kandyan kings, a flag that continued to be used during the reign of Sri Vikrama Rajasinha. He also clarified that this flag is distinct from the Sinhalese Royal Flag, which serves as the basis for the modern national flag of Sri Lanka, now modified with the addition of two stripes.

Civil Standard of the Kandyan Monarch

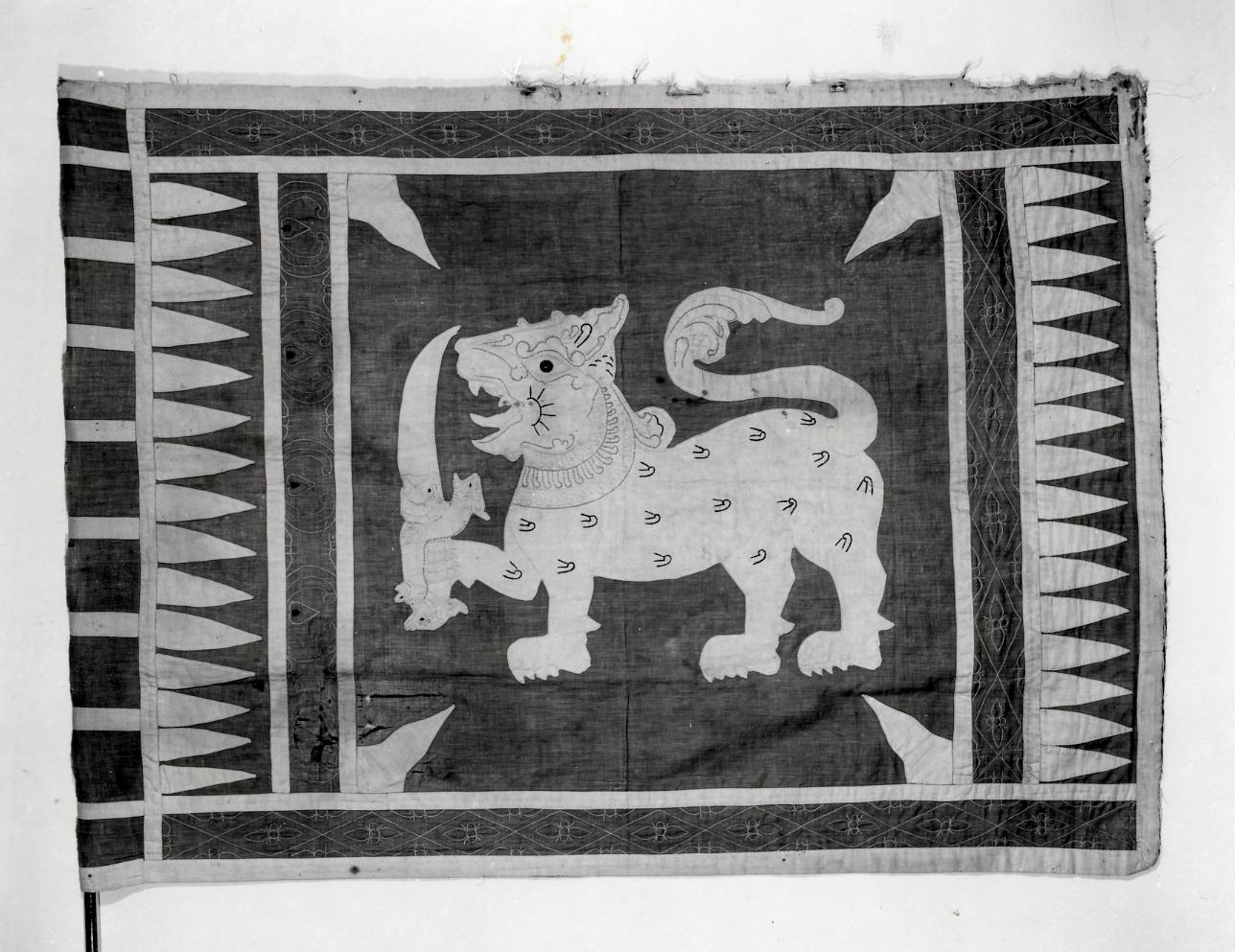
Photograph of the Royal Standard of the Kandyan king

== Disavani and Rata flags ==
Kandyan Provinces in 1815

The Kandyan kingdom was divided into 21 provinces, 12 Disavanis and 9 Ratas. Ratas were smaller administrative divisions in close proximity to the central government and governed by a Rate Mahatmaya, while Disavanis were larger, further away and governed by a Dissava (governor), acting as a representative of the king. Each disavani and rata was divided into Korales and the Korales in turn were divided into Pattu (singular, pattuva). Each pattuva consisted of a large number of villages which varied in extant and composition.

Each Disavani was entitled to have a distinct flag and each Disava was preceded by his particular flag while he was travelling in his disavani symbolizing their power and authority. Rate Mahatmaya had vastly lessor power and authority including that of not having the right to a flag.

Flag	Date	Use	Description
Maha Disavani
	19th century	Flag of the Satara Korales (Note: Four Korales)	Ira Handa Maha Kodiya (Sun and Moon Flag); Sun, moon and stars, on a white field
	19th century	Flag of the Sat Korales (Note: Seven Korales)	Siṇhayâ Maha Kodiya (Lion Flag)
	19th century	Flag of Uva	Haṇsayâ Maha Kodiya (Swan Flag)
	19th century	Flag of Sabaragamuwa	(Muthudal) Kaha Paṭa Redi Maha Kodiya (Yellow Silk Flag)
Sulu Disavani
	19th century	Flag of Matale	Sudu Maha Kodiya (White Flag)
	19th century	Flag of the Tun Korales (Note: Three Korales)	Bhéruṇḍaya Pakshiya Maha Kodiya (Flag); A Bhéruṇḍa (double headed eagle), a spread eagle
	19th century	Flag of Walapane	Mayura Maha Kodiya (Peacock Flag)
	19th century	Flag of Udapalata	Neḷum-mal Maha Kodiya (Lotus Flag)
	19th century	Flag of Nuvarakalaviya	Gajasiṇha Maha Kodiya (Gajasimha Flag)
	19th century	Flag of Vellassa	Kotiyá Maha Kodiya (Tiger/Leopard Flag)
	19th century	Flag of Bintanna	Girawá Maha Kodiya (Parrot Flag)
	19th century	Flag of Tamankaduva	Valahá Maha Kodiya (Bear Flag)
Rata
	19th century	Flag of Udunuwara	Kindura Maha Kodiya (Kinnara Flag)
	19th century	Flag of Yatinuwara	Gurula Maha Kodiya (Garuda Flag)
	19th century	Flag of Tumpane	Nelum-mal Maha Kodiya (Lotus Flag)
	19th century	Flag of Harispattuva Rata	Aliya(?) Maha Kodiya (Two Elephant Fronting Flag)
	19th century	Flag of Dumbara Rata	Sinhasane Kodiya (Lion Flag)
	19th century	Flag of Hevaheta Rata	Ravana Kodiya (Ravana Flag)
	19th century	Flag of Kotmale Rata	Sudu Pata Kodiya (White Flag)
	19th century	Flag of Meemure Rata	No information or reference
	19th century	Flag of Uda Bulathgama (Note: Upper Bulathgama)	No information or reference
	19th century	Flag of Patha Bulathgama (Note: Lower Bulathgama)	No information or reference

=== Other Minor Dissawa and Korale flags ===
Flag	Date	Use	Description
	19th century	Flag of Ihala and Pahala Dolospattuwa of Hat Korale	Viyagraya Maha Kodiya (Tiger Flag)
	?	Flag of Matara Dissawa	Kuru Aliya Kodiya (Dwarf Elephant Flag)
	?	Flag of Pasdun Korale	Unnamed, Peacock Chariot Flag

== Government flags ==
The Kandyan Government had their own flags to denote its official positions and departments.

Flag	Date	Use	Description
	19th century	Banner of Maha Lekam Department	Ethkandalihiniya Kodiya (Roc Banner)
	19th Century	Flag of Maha Lekam (Note: Chief Secretary and the archivist of the palace)	Lekammitiya ha Panhinda Kodiya (Palm Leaf Register and Writing Style Flag)
	19th century	Flag of Nanayakkara Department (Note: Genealogist who kept records of the men of noble birth and (military records?))	Nil Pata Kodiya (Light Blue Flag)
	19th century	Flag of Suduharakpattiye Nilame (Note: Chief of the royal herd of white cattle)	Gavaya Kodiya (Yak/Ox Flag)
	19th century	Flag of Batwadana Nilame/Rala (Note: Chief in charge of the royal kitchen)	Diyakava Kodiya (Indian Cormorant Flag)

== Military flags ==
Flag	Date	Use	Description
	19th Century	Flag of Atapattuwe Lekam (Note: Officer in charge of the royal body guard/army)	Davundaya/Davunde Kodiya (Drum Banner)
	19th century	Flag of Aspantiye Nilame (Note: Officer in charge of the royal stables)	Aspa Kodiya (Horse Flag)
	19th century	Flag of Gajanayaka Nilame (Note: Officer in charge of the royal elephants)	Hastiya Maha Kodiya (Elephant Flag)
	19th century	Flag of Tamboru Purampettukara Nilame (Note: Commander of the trumpeters and drummers)	Tamboru Purampettuwa Kodiya (Drum-Pipe Flag)
	19th Century	Flag of Sudaliya-Maruwalliya Nilame (Note: Leaders in charge of Fencer/Gladiator unit (from combination of the two Angampora schools))	Sudaliya-Maruwalliya Kodiya (Fencer/Gladiator Flag)
	19th century	Flag of Kodithuwakku Lekam (Note: Commander of the royal gingalls)	Kodithuwakkuwa bendi Kodiya (Gingall Flag)
	19th century	Flag of Ran Ayudage Maduve Lekam (Note: (Officer in charge of the Royal Golden Arms))	Nil Pata Kodiya (Blue Flag)
	19th century	Flag of Paidakara Lekam (Note: Officer in charge of the Royal Messenger office)	Rathu Pata Kodiya (Red Flag)
	19th century	Flag of Wedikkara Lekam (Note: Captain of the royal musketeers)	Rathu Pata Kodiya (Red Flag)
	19th century	Flag of Wadanatuwakkukara Lekam (Note: Officer in charge of the sharpshooters)	Sudu Pata Kodiya (White Flag)

== Other flags ==
We also know that hereditary clans and castes had flags, and that temples and monasteries displayed special banners of their own.

== See also ==
- Flag of Sri Lanka
- List of Sri Lankan flags

== Bibliography ==
Books

- Bell, H. C. P. (1904). Report on the Kegalla District of the Province of Sabaragamuwa, 1892. Colombo: George J. A. Skeen, Government Printer.
- Perera, Edward Walter (1916). Sinhalese banners and standards. Colombo: Printed by H.C. Cottle, Government Printer, Ceylon.
- Dewaraja, Lorna Srimathie (2008). The Kandyan Kingdom of Sri Lanka, 1707 - 1782 (2. rev. ed.). Colombo: Lake House Investments. ISBN 9555520186.
- Dewaraja, Lorna Srimathie (2018). The Kandy Äsaḷa maha perahära (First ed.). Colombo: Vijitha Yapa Publications. ISBN 9789556653779.
- de Silva, Nimal (2012). Flags: Flag Traditions Of Sri Lanka (2. rev. ed.). Colombo: Printed by Tharanjee Printers, Padmapani Designers & Publishers, Sri Lanka. ISBN 9789555123518.

Other

- Kulasekera, Kulasekera Mudiyanselage Padmasiri (1984). "British Administration in the Kandyan Provinces of Sri Lanka, 1815-1833, With Special Reference to Social Change". PhD thesis.
- Seneviratne, Maureen (13 May 1988). "Heraldry on Display: The Flags and Pennants of Sri Lanka". Explore Sri Lanka. Explore Sri Lanka.
- Edirisinghe, Padma. "The story of our Lion Flag". coins.lakdiva.org.lk.
- Kuruluwansa, Asela (6 August 2008). "Kandyan Royal Flag discovered". archives.dailynews.lk. Lake House. Daily News.
- de Vries, Hubert (8 August 2012). "Kandy". www.hubert-herald.nl.
- Pieris, Kamalika (19 April 2015). "Artistic and imaginative: Flags of the Udarata Kingdom". Wijeya Newspapers. The Sunday Times Sri Lanka.
- Senerath-Yapa, Yomal (21 February 2021). "Unearthing the forgotten Lion in faraway Chelsea". Print Edition - The Sunday Times, Sri Lanka.
- Wickramasinghe, Kamanthi (2 October 2020). "Senaka experiments interior décor with Sri Lanka's provincial flags". www.dailymirror.lk. Wijeya Newspapers Ltd. Daily Mirror.
