= List of chief ministers of Sabaragamuwa Province =

Chief Minister of Sabaragamuwa Province
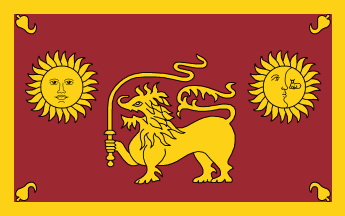
- Flag of Sabaragamuwa
- Incumbent; Governor's Rule since 27 September 2017
- Board of Ministers of the Sabaragamuwa
- Style: The Honourable
- Member of: Sabaragamuwa Provincial Council
- Appointer: Amara Piyaseeli Ratnayake
- Inaugural holder: G. V. Punchinilame
- Formation: 3 February 1988
- Website: Sabaragamuwa Provincial Council

The chief minister of Sabaragamuwa Province, Sri Lanka, is the head of the provincial board of ministers, a body which aids and advises the governor, the head of the provincial government, in the exercise of his executive power. The governor appoints as chief minister the member of the Sabaragamuwa Provincial Council who, in his opinion, commands the support of a majority of that council. The current chief minister is Maheepala Herath.

== Chief ministers ==
Sri Lanka Freedom Party United National Party

No.	Name	Portrait	Party	Took office	Left office	Refs
1	G. V. Punchinilame		United National Party	April 1988	April 1989	
2	Abeyratne Pilapitiya		United National Party	10 April 1989	March 1993	
3	Jayatilake Podinilame		United National Party	March 1993	June 1998	
	Vacant			June 1998	April 1999	
4	Kantha Gunatilleke		Sri Lanka Freedom Party	April 1999	June 1999	
5	Athauda Seneviratne		Sri Lanka Freedom Party	June 1999	October 2000	
6	Asoka Jayawardena		Sri Lanka Freedom Party	October 2000	13 December 2001	
7	Mohan Ellawala		Sri Lanka Freedom Party	13 December 2001	25 July 2004	
8	Maheepala Herath		Sri Lanka Freedom Party	25 July 2004	26 September 2017	
	Vacant			27 September 2017		
