= Flag of North Eastern Province, Sri Lanka =

Sri Lankan provincial flag

North Eastern Province
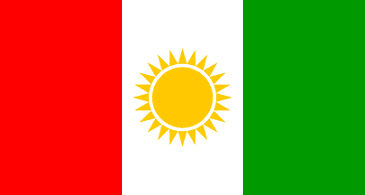
- Proportion: 3:2
- Adopted: 1987
- Relinquished: 2006
- Design: A symbol of the Sun in the centre with three vertical stripes red, white and green.

The flag of North Eastern Province, was adopted for the North Eastern Province of Sri Lanka in 1987. The flag was disused after 31 December 2006.

== History ==
It was used until 31 December 2006, when the province was abolished and separated into the Northern and Eastern Provinces, with the Supreme Court ruling that by 2007 the 1987 order of merging the two provinces, under the Indo-Sri Lanka Accord, Northern and Eastern was illegal and therefore the two provinces must be administered separately. This meant two separate flags for the Northern and Eastern provinces.

== Symbolism ==
The flag of the North Eastern Province is similar to the current Flag of Northern Province. It has a symbol of the Sun in the middle of the flag, with three vertical stripes red, white and green.

== See also ==
- Flag of Sri Lanka
- Flag of Eastern Province
- Flag of Northern Province
- List of Sri Lankan flags
