= Ruwanwella Electoral District =

Electoral district of Sri Lanka

Ruwanwella electoral district was an electoral district of Sri Lanka between August 1947 and February 1989. The district was named after the town of Ruwanwella in Kegalle District, Sabaragamuwa Province. The 1978 Constitution of Sri Lanka introduced the proportional representation electoral system for electing members of Parliament. The existing 160 mainly single-member electoral districts were replaced with 22 multi-member electoral districts. Ruwanwella electoral district was replaced by the Kegalle multi-member electoral district at the 1989 general elections, the first under the proportional representation system.

== Members of Parliament ==
Key

Independent LSSP UNP SLFP

Election	Member	Party	Term
1947	N. M. Perera	Lanka Sama Samaja Party	
1952	N. M. Perera	Lanka Sama Samaja Party	
1956	N. M. Perera	Lanka Sama Samaja Party	
1960 (March)	H. G. Somabandu		
1960 (July)	P. C. Imbulana	United National Party	
1965	P. C. Imbulana	United National Party	
1970	Athauda Seneviratne	Lanka Sama Samaja Party	
1977	P. C. Imbulana	United National Party	

== Elections ==
=== 1947 Parliamentary General Election ===
Results of the 1st parliamentary election held between 23 August 1947 and 20 September 1947 for the district:

Candidate	Party	Symbol	Votes	%
N. M. Perera	Lanka Sama Samaja Party	House	10,065	57.76
P. C. Imbulana	United National Party	Hand	5,029	28.86
W. R. Dharmasena		Elephant	1,583	9.08
Valid Votes			16,857	96.73
Rejected Votes			569	3.27
Total Polled			17,426	100.00
Registered Electors			29,177	
Turnout				59.73

=== 1952 Parliamentary General Election ===
Results of the 2nd parliamentary election held between 24 May 1952 and 30 May 1952 for the district:

Candidate	Party	Symbol	Votes	%
N. M. Perera	Lanka Sama Samaja Party	House	10,601	51.78
P. C. Imbulana	United National Party	Elephant	9,558	47.41
Valid Votes			20,159	98.46
Rejected Votes			316	1.54
Total Polled			20,475	100.00
Registered Electors			25,930	
Turnout				78.96

=== 1956 Parliamentary General Election ===
Results of the 3rd parliamentary election held between 5 April 1956 and 10 April 1956 for the district:

Candidate	Party	Symbol	Votes	%
N. M. Perera	Lanka Sama Samaja Party	Key	14,083	63.68
R. Premadasa		Elephant	7,855	35.52
Valid Votes			21,938	99.20
Rejected Votes			178	0.80
Total Polled			22,116	100.00
Registered Electors			29,954	
Turnout				73.83

=== 1960 (March) Parliamentary General Election ===
Results of the 4th parliamentary election held on 19 March 1960 for the district:

Candidate	Party	Symbol	Votes	%
H. G. Somabandu		Key	9,883	47.97
P. C. Imbulana	United National Party	Elephant	9,221	44.76
M. G. Tennakoon		Cartwheel	1,370	6.65
Valid Votes			20,474	99.38
Rejected Votes			127	0.62
Total Polled			20,601	100.00
Registered Electors			25,198	
Turnout				81.76

=== 1960 (July) Parliamentary General Election ===
Results of the 5th parliamentary election held on 20 July 1960 for the district:

Candidate	Party	Symbol	Votes	%
P. C. Imbulana	United National Party	Elephant	10,827	53.20
H. G. Somabandu		Key	9,452	46.45
Valid Votes			20,279	99.65
Rejected Votes			71	0.35
Total Polled			20,350	100.00
Registered Electors			25,198	
Turnout				80.76

=== 1965 Parliamentary General Election ===
Results of the 6th parliamentary election held on 22 March 1965 for the district:

Candidate	Party	Symbol	Votes	%
P. C. Imbulana	United National Party	Elephant	14,181	50.59
Athauda Seneviratne	Lanka Sama Samaja Party	Key	13,764	49.10
Valid Votes			27,945	99.70
Rejected Votes			85	0.30
Total Polled			28,030	100.00
Registered Electors			32,580	
Turnout				86.03

=== 1970 Parliamentary General Election ===
Results of the 7th parliamentary election held on 27 May 1970 for the district:

Candidate	Party	Symbol	Votes	%
Athauda Seneviratne	Lanka Sama Samaja Party	Key	17,377	54.48
P. C. Imbulana	United National Party	Elephant	14,441	45.28
Valid Votes			31,818	99.76
Rejected Votes			78	0.24
Total Polled			31,896	100.00
Registered Electors			35,268	
Turnout				90.44

=== 1977 Parliamentary General Election ===
Results of the 8th parliamentary election held on 21 July 1977 for the district:

Candidate	Party	Symbol	Votes	%
P. C. Imbulana	United National Party	Elephant	19,989	53.86
Athauda Seneviratne	Lanka Sama Samaja Party	Key	15,922	42.90
G. L. Samaratunga		Hand	673	1.81
B. Samarasekera		Spoon	529	1.43
Valid Votes			37,026	99.77
Rejected Votes			87	0.23
Total Polled			37,113	100.00
Registered Electors			41,578	
Turnout				89.26
