= P. C. Imbulana =

Sri Lankan politician (1920–2012)

Hon. P. C. Imbulana

2nd Governor of Central Province
- In office 1 February 1990 – May 1994
- President: Ranasinghe Premadasa; Dingiri Banda Wijetunga
- Prime Minister: Dingiri Banda Wijetunga
- Preceded by: E. L. B. Hurulle
- Succeeded by: E. L. Senanayake

1st Governor of Uva Province
- In office May 1988 – January 1990
- President: Ranasinghe Premadasa
- Prime Minister: Dingiri Banda Wijetunga
- Preceded by: Office Created
- Succeeded by: Tilak Ratnayake

Member of the Ceylon Parliament for Ruwanwella
- In office July 1960 – December 1969
- Preceded by: H. G. Somabandu
- Succeeded by: Athauda Seneviratne
- In office July 1977 – May 1988
- Preceded by: Athauda Seneviratne

Personal details
- Born: Prema Chandra Imbulana; 18 October 1920 Ruwanwella, Sri Lanka
- Died: 28 September 2012 (aged 91)
- Party: United National Party
- Education: Trinity College, Kandy
- Occupation: Politician

Prema Chandra Imbulana (18 October 1920 – 28 September 2012) was a Sri Lankan politician who was elected to the Ceylonese Parliament representing Ruwanwella and served as the Minister of Labour. He was appointed as the first Governor of Uva Province and subsequently the second Governor of Central Province.

Imbulana was born in Ruwanwella on 18 October 1920, the son of Kuruvitaarachchilage Martin Appuhamy Imbulama, the village headman. He attended Trinity College, Kandy. Prema was elected as the youngest Village Council Chairman of Ruwanwella and was one of the founding members of the United National Party in 1946. He unsuccessfully ran for parliament in the Ruwanwella Electoral District three times (1947, 1952 and 1960). He was however successful on his fourth attempt at the July 1960 parliamentary elections, receiving over 53% of the vote. Prema was re-elected in 1965 and was made the Deputy Minister of Agriculture in the Dudley Senanayake government. In the Jayewardene government he was appointed Deputy Minister Local Government, Housing and Construction before he was appointed Minister of Labour in the Premadasa cabinet. With the formation of the newly established Provincial Councils Prema was selected in May 1988 as the first Governor of Uva Province a position he retained until January 1990, when on 1 February 1990 he was appointed as the second Governor of Central Province where he served until he retired in May 1994.

Political offices
Preceded by E. L. B. Hurulle	Governor of Central Province; 1990–1994	Succeeded by E. L. Senanayake
Preceded by Office created	Governor of Uva; 1988–1990	Succeeded by Tilak Ratnayake
