= List of historical Sinhalese flags and symbols =

This is a list of flags used by Sinhalese people throughout different historical periods in Sri Lanka.

== Anuradhapura period ==
=== Flags of Anuradhapura ===
Flags	Date	Used by	Description
	161 BC to 1017 AD	Anuradhapura Kingdom	Original depiction of King Dutugamunu flag
	161 BC to 1017 AD	Anuradhapura Kingdom	Flag used by King Dutugamunu and his successors.
	273 to 301 AD	Anuradhapura Kingdom	Flag used by King Mahasen during his period of rule.

=== Symbols of Anuradhapura ===
Symbol	Name	Date	Used by	Description
	Railed Swastika	300 BC to 400 AD	Anuradhapura Kingdom	Found in early Anuradhapura era coins.
	Railed Triratna	2nd century BC	Anuradhapura Kingdom	Found in the Bōvattegala inscription.
	Triratna	200 BC to 300 AD	Anuradhapura Kingdom	Found in early Anuradhapura era coins.
	Asana	300 BC to 400 AD	Anuradhapura Kingdom	Found in early Anuradhapura era coins.
	Isosceles triangle headed standard	300 BC to 400 AD	Anuradhapura Kingdom	Found in early Anuradhapura era coins.
	Elephant	300 BC to 400 AD	Anuradhapura Kingdom	Found in early Anuradhapura era coins.
	Sun and lion	9th century	Anuradhapura Kingdom	Found in the Kongollava Pillar Inscription of Sena II.
	Ira Sanda (Sun & Moon)	8th-9th century	Anuradhapura Kingdom	Found in late Anuradhapura era coins.
Symbol discovered in late Anuradhapura period	Adahanda (Crescent moon)	9th-10th century	Anuradhapura Kingdom	Found in late Anuradhapura era coins.
	Simhala Srivatsa	800 AD to 1000 AD	Anuradhapura Kingdom	Found in late Anuradhapura era coins.
Found in the late Anuradhapura period coins	Nelummala	9th-10th century	Anuradhapura Kingdom	Found in late Anuradhapura era coins.
	Pichchamala	11th century	Anuradhapura Kingdom	Found in late Anuradhapura era coins.

== Polonnaruwa and Dambadeniya period ==
=== Symbols of Polonnaruwa and Dambadeniya ===
Symbol	Name	Date	Used by	Description
	Simhala Srivatsa	1153 AD to 1110 AD	Polonnaruwa Kingdom	Found in Polonnaruwa era coins.
Found in Anuradhapura and Polonnaruwa coins	Lamp	1153 AD to 1186 AD	Polonnaruwa Kingdom	Found in Polonnaruwa era coins.
	Hakgediya	1055 AD to 1310 AD	Polonnaruwa and Dambadeniya Kingdom	Found in Polonnaruwa and Dambadeniya era coins.
	Simhala Srivatsa	1055 AD to 1310 AD	Polonnaruwa and Dambadeniya Kingdom	Found in Polonnaruwa and Dambadeniya era coins.
	Pichchamala	1055 AD to 1310 AD	Polonnaruwa and Dambadeniya Kingdom	Found in Polonnaruwa and Dambadeniya era coins.
	Five Gola	1055 AD to 1310 AD	Polonnaruwa and Dambadeniya Kingdom	Found in Polonnaruwa and Dambadeniya era coins.

== Transitional period ==
=== Flags of Kotte era ===
Flag	Date	Used by	Description
	1412–1597 AD	Kotte Kingdom	Military standard of Parakramabahu VI of Kingdom of Kotte
	1521-1538 AD	Raigama Kingdom	Used as the flag of the Kingdom of Raigama and Royal standard of Raigam Bandara. (Note: The flag colours are based on colours commonly used in Sinhalese flags and banners during the 14th–16th centuries.)
	1581–1593 AD	Sitawaka Kingdom	Used as the flag of the Kingdom of Sitawaka and the royal standard of Rajasinha I.
	?–1594 AD	Sitawaka Kingdom	Flag of the Tun Korale province.

=== Symbols of Kotte era ===
Symbol	Name	Date	Used by	Description
	Kotte Lion	1412– 1467 AD	Kotte Kingdom	Kotte lion found in Parakramabahu VI coins.
	Reverse five Gola	1412– 1467 AD	Kotte Kingdom	Symbol found in Kotte era coins.

== Kandyan period ==
=== National flags and royal standards of the Kandyan Kingdom ===
Flag	Date	Description
	1629–1634 AD	Royal Standard of Crown Prince Kumārasiṃha Astana
	1634–1654 AD	Royal Standard of Crown Prince Vijayapāla
	1798–1815 AD	Sinha flag with the lion holding the Kastane
	1798–1815 AD	Sinha flag with the lion holding the whip
	1798–1815 AD	Royal and Civil Standard of King Sri Vikrama Rajasinha

=== Flags of Disavanis and Ratas ===
Flag	Date	Description
Maha Disavanis
	~19th century	Flag of the Satara Korales (Note: Four Korales)
	~19th century	Flag of the Sat Korales (Note: Seven Korales)
	~19th century	Flag of Uva
	~19th century	Flag of Sabaragamuwa
Sulu Disavanis
	~19th century	Flag of Matale
	~19th century	Flag of the Tun Korales (Note: Three Korales)
	~19th century	Flag of Valapane
	~19th century	Flag of Udapalata
	~19th century	Flag of Nuvarakalaviya
	~19th century	Flag of Vellassa
	~19th century	Flag of Bintanna
	~19th century	Flag of Tamankaduva
	~19th century	Flag of Matara Dissawa

=== Ratas ===
Flag	Date	Description
	~19th century	Flag of Udunuwara
	~19th century	Flag of Yatinuwara
	~19th century	Flag of Tumpane
	~19th century	Flag of Harispattuva Rata
	~19th century	Flag of Dumbara Rata
	~19th century	Flag of Hewaheta Rata
	~19th century	Flag of Kotmale Rata

=== Minor Korale flags ===
Flag	Date	Description
	?	Flag of Pasdun Korale

=== Flags of Kandyan government officials ===
Flag	Date	Description
	~19th century	Banner of Maha Lekam Department
	~19th century	Flag of Nanayakkara Department (Note: Genealogist who kept records of the men of noble birth and (military records?))
	~19th century	Flag of Suduharakpattiye Nilame (Note: Chief of the royal herd of white cattle)
	~19th century	Flag of Batwadana Nilame/Rala (Note: Chief in charge of the royal kitchen)
	~19th century	Flag of Atapattuwe Lekam (Note: Officer in charge of the royal body guard/army)
	~19th century	Flag of Aspantiye Nilame (Note: Officer in charge of the royal stables)
	~19th century	Flag of Gajanayaka Nilame (Note: Officer in charge of the royal elephants)
	~19th century	Flag of Tamboru Purampettukara Nilame (Note: Commander of the trumpeters and drummers)
	~19th century	Flag of Kodithuwakku Lekam (Note: Commander of the royal gingalls)
	~19th century	Flag of Sudaliya-Maruvalliya Nilame (Note: Leader in charge of Fencer and Gladiator unit (from combination of the two Angampora schools))
	~19th century	Flag of Ran Ayudage Maduve Lekam (Note: (Officer in charge of the Royal Golden Arms))
	~19th century	Flag of Paidakara Lekam (Note: Officer in charge of the Royal Messenger office)
	~19th century	Flag of Wedikkara Lekam (Note: Captain of the royal musketeers)
	~19th century	Flag of Wadanatuwakkukara Lekam (Note: Officer in charge of the sharpshooters)

== Miscellaneous flags ==
Flag	Date	Used in	Description
	1848	British Ceylon	Flag of Gongalegoda Banda (Sri Wickrama Siddipathi), Pretender to the Kandyan throne.
	1848	British Ceylon	Flag of Veera Puran Appu, Prime minister and the Sword bearer of Banda the Pretender of Kandyan throne.
