= Athauda Seneviratne =

Sri Lankan politician (1931–2022)

Member of Parliament for Ruwanwella Electoral District
- In office 1970–1977
- Preceded by: P. C. Imbulana
- Succeeded by: P. C. Imbulana

Member of Parliament for Kegalle Electoral District
- In office 1989–2015

Chief Minister of Sabaragamuwa Province
- In office 1999
- Preceded by: Kantha Gunatilleke
- Succeeded by: Asoka Jayawardena

Deputy Minister of Parliamentary Affairs
- In office 1 September 1994 – 9 June 1997

Deputy Minister of Transport and Highways
- In office 9 June 1997 – 2 June 1999

Minister of Ethnic Affairs, National Integration and Mineral Resources
- In office 17 November 2000 – 14 September 2001

Minister of Labour and Foreign Employment
- In office 10 April 2004 – 9 April 2010

Minister of Justice
- In office 23 April 2010 – 22 November 2010
- Preceded by: Milinda Moragoda
- Succeeded by: Rauff Hakeem

Minister of Rural Affairs
- In office 22 November 2010 – 9 January 2015

Personal details
- Born: 19 December 1931
- Died: 31 March 2022 (aged 90) Colombo, Sri Lanka
- Party: United People's Freedom Alliance
- Other political affiliations: Socialist Alliance; Lanka Sama Samaja Party; Sri Lanka Freedom Party

Athauda Seneviratne (19 December 1931 – 31 March 2022) was a Sri Lankan politician. A member of various left-wing political parties, he served in the Parliament of Sri Lanka and was a cabinet member in various offices.

== Early and personal life ==
Seneviratne was born on 19 December 1931. However, one newspaper claims he was born on 19 September of the same year. He was married and a Buddhist, and worked as an educator. He lived in Colombo. He had a son who in 2020, was arrested in Cinnamon Gardens for allegedly assaulting a police officer; he was released on bail after making a court appearance. He died on 31 March 2022, aged 90, at a private hospital in Colombo.

== Political career ==
Seneviratne entered politics in either 1954 or 1957. He was first a member of the Lanka Sama Samaja Party. He later joined the Sri Lanka Freedom Party. In 1991, the Leicester Mercury stated he was a member of the Socialist Alliance, a political alliance which encompassed Lanka Sama Samaja. He was elected to his last political office on a ticket of the United People's Freedom Alliance.

Seneviratne served in the Parliament of Sri Lanka as a member of the Sri Lanka Freedom Party. He served from 1970 to 1977, and again from 1989 to 2015, representing the Ruwanwella Electoral District, then the Kegalle District, respectively. In 1999, he was Chief Minister of Sabaragamuwa Province. In 2007, he accompanied President Mahinda Rajapaksa in a meeting with the International Red Cross and Red Crescent Movement, regarding human rights.

Seneviratne was Deputy Minister of Parliamentary Affairs, from 1 September 1994, to 9 June 1997. He was Deputy Minister of Transport and Highways, from 9 June 1997, to 2 June 1999. He was Minister of Ethnic Affairs, National Integration and Mineral Resources, from 17 November 2000, to 14 September 2001. He was Minister of Labour and Foreign Employment, from 10 April 2004, to 9 April 2010. He was Minister of Justice, from 23 April 2010, to 22 November 2010. Finally, he was Minister of Rural Affairs, from 22 November 2010, to 9 January 2015.

Seneviratne supported Sajith Premadasa in the 2019 Sri Lankan presidential election. He, in retrospect, supported Mahatma Gandhi, with him saying Gandhi "safeguarded" Sri Lanka. In 1989, he called for a ceasefire to end then-ongoing violence present in the country. At some point, he was sued by police, as part of a group of nineteen litigants, for causing damage to a drinking water project in Kohombadeniya, a rural community.
