= List of Sri Lankan flags =

This is a list of flags used in Sri Lanka.

== National flag ==
Flag	Date	Use	Description
	1972–	Flag of the Democratic Socialist Republic of Sri Lanka	A modified flag of the Dominion of Ceylon. Two fields separated by a golden border: the smaller hoist-side field has only two vertical halves of green and orange and the larger fly-side field is dark red with a golden lion holding a kastane sword in its right forepaw in the center and a bo tree (bodhi tree) leaf on each of the four corners, and the golden border around the entire flag extends in between the two separate fields. Used since the proclamation of the republic in 1972.
	1972–	Flag of the Democratic Socialist Republic of Sri Lanka (vertical)	When displayed vertically, the green and orange bands of the hoist are placed at the top, with the paws of the lion to the left and the head to the right.

== Presidential flags (1972–2022) ==
This flag was personal to every president of Sri Lanka, and as such the design changed when a new president assumed office.

On 15 July 2022, the acting president Ranil Wickremesinghe abolished the presidential flag.

Flag	Date	Use
	22 May 1972 – 4 February 1978	Presidential flag of William Gopallawa
	4 February 1978 – 2 January 1989	Presidential flag of J. R. Jayewardene
	2 January 1989 – 1 May 1993	Presidential flag of Ranasinghe Premadasa
	1 May 1993 – 12 November 1994	Presidential flag of D. B. Wijetunga
	12 November 1994 – 19 November 2005	Presidential flag of Chandrika Kumaratunga
	19 November 2005 – 9 January 2015	Presidential flag of Mahinda Rajapaksa
	9 January 2015 – 18 November 2019	Presidential flag of Maithripala Sirisena
	18 November 2019 – 14 July 2022	Presidential flag of Gotabaya Rajapaksa

== Civil ensigns ==
Flag	Date	Use	Description
	1955–1969	Civil ensign of Sri Lanka	A Red Ensign with the flag of Sri Lanka in the canton influenced by the British design.
	1972–	Blue Ensign of Sri Lanka	A Blue Ensign with the flag of Sri Lanka in the canton influenced by the British design. The Blue Ensign is flown by merchant vessels commanded by an officer of the SLVNF.

== Military flags ==
Flag	Date	Use	Description
	1972–	Flag of the Sri Lanka Army	The army flag defaced with the insignia of the Sri Lanka Army.
	1972–	Naval ensign of Sri Lanka	A defaced White Ensign with the flag of Sri Lanka in the canton influenced by the British design.
	2010–	Air Force ensign of Sri Lanka	A defaced sky blue ensign with the flag of Sri Lanka in the canton and Air Force roundel influenced by the British design.
	2010–	Air Force colours of Sri Lanka	Sri Lanka Air Force ensign with four vertical stripes of saffron, green, maroon, and yellow in the centre, and superimposed by the Sri Lanka national emblem.
	1955–	Flag of the Sri Lanka Armoured Corps	Sri Lanka Armoured Corps emblem in the centre with the three vertical stripes of black, white.
	1983–	Flag of the Gajaba Regiment	
	1984–	Flag of the Sri Lanka Army Seva Vanitha Unit	
	1986–	Flag of the Sri Lanka Civil Security Force	
	?–present	Flag of the Sri Lanka Sinha Regiment	
	?–present	Sri Lanka Army Volunteer Force	A yellow field defaced with a central black emblem featuring a standing elephant above a pair of crossed ornate ceremonial swords and a black scroll bearing the Sinhala text "Sri Lanka Army - Volunteer Force".

=== Former military flags ===
Flag	Date	Use	Description
Post-independence era flags
	1949–1966	First flag of the Ceylon Army	
	1949–1966	Flag of the Commander in Chief	
	1949–1966	War flag	
	1966–1972	Second flag of the Ceylon Army	
	1950–1972	Ensign of the Royal Ceylon Navy	
	1951–1972	Ensign of the Royal Ceylon Air Force	
	1971–2010	Ensign of the Sri Lanka Air Force	
	1971–2010	Unit colour of the Sri Lanka Air Force	
Kotte-Sitawaka-Kandyan era flags
	?–1815	Flag of the Supreme Commander of the Kandyan Royal Army	A white field bordered in maroon and defaced with a stylized black ceremonial elephant adorned with decorative trappings and carrying a flower in its trunk.
	?–1815	Flag of the Commander over the Cavalry	
	?–1815	Flag of the Royal Army/Guard	A red field defaced with an array of golden weapons and a drum including a disc-weapon, a bow, a sword, an axe, and a scabbard on a sky-blue border.
	?–1815	Flag of the Officer over the trumpeters and drummers	
	?–1815	Flag of the leaders in charge of Fencer and Gladiator unit	
	?–1815	Flag of the Commander of the Royal Gingalls	
	?–1815	Flag of the Officer in charge of the Royal Golden Arms	
	?–1815	Flag of the Captain of the Royal Musketeers	
	?–1815	Flag of Officer in charge of the Sharpshooters	

== Government flags ==
Flag	Date	Use	Description
	1972–	Flag of the Sri Lanka Police	
	2010–	Flag of the Sri Lanka Coast Guard	
	?–present	Ensign of the Sri Lanka Special Task Force (STF)	
	?–present	Flag of the Sri Lanka Customs	
	?–present	Flag of the Sri Lanka Ports Authority	
	?–present	Flag of the Sri Lanka Transport Board	

=== Former government flags ===
Flag	Date	Use	Description
	?–2010	Flag of the Sri Lanka Coast Guard	

== Sporting flags ==
Flag	Date	Use	Description
	?–present	Flag of the National Olympic Committee of Sri Lanka	
	?–present	Flag of the Sri Lanka Volleyball Federation	
	?–present	Flag of Sri Lanka Cricket	
	?–present	Flag of the Sri Lanka Football Federation	
	?–present	Flag of the Sri Lanka national rugby union team	

== Other flags ==
Flag	Date	Use	Description
	?–present	Flag of the Sri Lanka Red Cross	

== Provincial flags ==
Flag	Date	Use	Description
	November 14, 1987 –	Flag of Central Province	The flag is designed to represents the Central Province and its three districts Kandy, Matale, and Nuwara Eliya. The golden lion that carries a sword and the bo leaves at the four corners in the maroon background represents the Kandy District. The white layout represents Matale District and Nuwara Eliya District which represents the upcountry is symbolised by the white lotus. The Sun and Moon are for eternity.
	January 1, 2007 –	Flag of Eastern Province	
	November 14, 1987 –	Flag of North Central Province	
	November 14, 1987 – December 31, 2006	Flag of North Eastern Province	Adapted as the flag of the Northern Province after the demerger of the North-Eastern Province.
	January 1, 2007 –	Flag of Northern Province	Blue border – ocean resource; green – the greenery and agriculture; red – labour, industriousness and Hindu culture, religion; white – fraternity, peace; radiating sun indicates synergy of power and natural energy source, also Tamil people and language in the province.
	November 14, 1987 –	Flag of North Western Province	A brown bovine with a sun and moon symbol on a white background. There are fifteen small eight-pointed cross-stars in the background, and a green and brown woven border surrounds the whole.
	November 14, 1987 –	Flag of Sabaragamuwa Province	
	November 14, 1987 –	Flag of Southern Province	A picture of a lion flag can be seen in frescos in the historical Dambulla Cave temple. This historical flag made of carving a picture of a running lion with a small sword in its forepaw is considered to be the Ruhuna flag. Furthermore, King Dutugamunu left the Magam Kingdom with the lion flag ahead for the battle to unite the country. The flag is a picture of a yellow lion on a red blood colour background. Accordingly, it was decided to use for the Southern Provincial flag the picture of the lion running with a small sword (iluk koolaya) in its forepaw of the Ruhuna flag and the red colour and yellow colour of the flag taken on the war front by King Dutugamunu. It was decided to use the same for the Southern Province flag mixture of colours and the standard to represent all communities in Galle, Matara, and Hambantota and four bo leaves (Metta, Karuna, Muditha, Upeksha) of the national flag. It was agreed that the forms of the sun and moon of the flag of Southern Province flag should be in the same forms as the sun and moon of the flag of Devinuwara Devalaya and that the same form that of the flag of Hambantota District. Accordingly, it was expected to keep the integration of Galle, Matara and Hambantota. Therefore, the Southern Province flag can be considered a combination of several traditional flags. The small sword (iluk Koolaya) is the symbol of control, but it does not reflect terror or suppression. The small sword represents Justice and fairness. Running lion represents velocity fearlessness and pride. The sun and moon stand for stability prosperity and augustness. It expresses the traditional saying "Until the sun and moon exists". The sun and moon of the flag are considered to be symbols of victory. The combination of colours around the flag depicts the existence of Southern Sri Lanka, victorious war history, religion and patriotism, mutual cooperation and harmony.
	November 14, 1987 –	Flag of Uva Province	In the days of the Sinhala kings, Sri Lanka had been divided into twelve provinces and ruled and each of these twelve provinces had been allotted a flag. Accordingly, in order to bring about qualities such as pleasantness, innocence, greatness and royalty, a flag with a picture of swan had been allotted to the Uva Province. The flag that was gifted to Uva Province by the King Sri Vickrama Rajasinghe who ruled the kingdom of Kandy during the period 1798–1815 can be seen even today at the National Museum (Courtesy: Book entitled “Uva Ithihasaya” by Panditha Naulle Dhammananda Thero)
	November 14, 1987 –	Flag of Western Province	

== Historical flags ==
=== Flags of the Sinhala Kingdom ===
Flag	Date	Use	Description
	437 BC – 1017 AD	Flag of the Anuradhapura Kingdom	Flag of King Dutugamunu (161–137 B.C.) and it's known as the flag of the Anuradhapura Kingdom. The flag believed to have been used by Sinhala king Dutthagamani (Dutugamunu) and subsequent monarchs.
	273–301	State flag or personal banner of King Mahasena	Flag or personal banner of King Mahasena from the Anuradhapura Kingdom. Known in Sinhala as සෙවුල් කොඩිය (Sevul Kodiya), the flag features a rooster eating a snake. It also includes the sun and moon emblems, traditional royal insignia of Sinhala monarchs.
	1341–1408	Flag of the Kingdom of Gampola	A white field with red dots and a red border, featuring a gurula holding a snake.
	1412–1597	Flag of the Kingdom of Kotte	A plain white field with ornate blue- and red-leaved white border and a lion with a whip at the centre.
	1521–1538	Flag of the Kingdom of Raigama	A white field with a red border and a gurula fighting a snake in the center.
	1521–1594	Flag of the Kingdom of Sitawaka	A green field with a light orange elephant in the centre.
	1469–1815	Flag of the Kingdom of Kandy	The flag adopted was the royal standard and featured a gold and black bordered red field with bo leaves and lion with a sword. This is similar to the fly portion of the modern flag.

=== Tamil Kingdom Flags ===
Flag	Date	Use	Description
	1215–1619	Flag of the Jaffna Kingdom	A silver crescent moon with a golden sun. The single sacred conch shell, which spiral open to the right, and in the centre above the sacred bull, is a white parasol with golden tassels and white pearls.This flag was created based on Nandi symbol portrayed on Sethu coin. The flag of the Jaffna kingdom of the Aryacakravarti line of kings of Jaffna kingdom in northern Sri Lanka consisted of the couchant bull (also called a Nandi), the silver crescent moon with a golden sun. The single sacred conch shell, which spiral open to the right, and in the centre above the sacred bull, is a white parasol with golden tassels and white pearls. The color of the Royal Flag is saffron. The flag symbols are similar to number of flags found in India especially belonging to the Eastern Ganga dynasty. The Setu coins minted by the Aryacakravarti kings also have a similar symbol.
	1232–1805	Flag of the Vanni cheiftaincies	The flag of the Vanni kings.

=== Flag of Sri Lanka since 1948 ===
Flag	Date	Use	Description
	1948–1951	The first flag of the Dominion of Ceylon	The Royal standard of the Kandyan Kingdom, the last kingdom of Sri Lanka.
	1951–1972	The second flag of the Dominion of Ceylon	Defaced flag of Kandyan Kingdom, the last kingdom of Sri Lanka.

== Royal standards ==
Flag	Date	Use	Description
	161 BC – 137 BC	Flag of King Dutugamunu, as depicted in the Dambulla Viharaya cave no. 2	A white swallowtailed field with a lion holding a sword in its right forepaw and the Sun and the Moon above.
	273–301	Royal standard of Mahasena of Anuradhapura	
	1372/3–1391/2	Royal standard of Bhuvanekabahu V	
	1415–1457	Military standard of Parakramabahu VI of Kotte	
	1521–1538	Royal standard of Pararajasinha	
	1581–1593	Royal standard of Rajasinha I	
	1629–1634	Royal standard of Kumārasiṃha Astana	
	1628–1654	Royal standard of Vijayapāla	
	1798–1815	Civil and Royal standard of Sri Vikrama Rajasinha	
	1848	Royal standard of Gongalegoda Banda "Sri Wickrama Siddhipathi"	

== Colonial-era flags ==
=== Portuguese Ceylon flags ===
Flag	Date	Use	Description
	1597–1640	Flag of the Kingdom of Portugal	A white field with the Portuguese coat of arms in the center.
	1616–1640	Flag of the Kingdom of Portugal (putative flag)	A white field with the Portuguese coat of arms in the center.
	1640–1658	Flag of the Kingdom of Portugal	A white field with the Portuguese coat of arms in the center.

=== Dutch Ceylon flags ===
Flag	Date	Use	Description
	1630–1796	Dutch East India Company flag	A horizontal triband of red, white, and blue with letters VOC in the middle.

=== British Ceylon flags ===
Flag	Date	Use	Description
	1796–1801	Flag of the Kingdom of Great Britain	A superimposition of the flags of England and Scotland (Union Jack).
	1801–1875	Flag of the United Kingdom	A superimposition of the flags of England and Scotland with the Saint Patrick's Saltire (representing Ireland) (Union Jack).
	1875–1948	Flag of Ceylon's colonial government	A defaced Blue Ensign with the arms of the Ceylon government.
	Early 19th century	Flag of Ceylon (local)	A locally crafted Ceylon flag.

== Political party ==
Flag	Date	Use	Description
	1946–present	The flag of the UNP	
	1951–present	The flag of the SLPF	
	2019–present	The flag of the NPP	
	1965–present	The flag of the JVP	
	1949–present	The flag of the "Federal Party of Sri Lanka" / ITAK	
	1981–present	The flag of the Sri Lanka Muslim Congress	

== Religious flags ==
Flag	Date	Use	Description
	1885–present	Flag of Buddhism	Blazon: Paly Azure, Or, Gules, Argent, Orange, barry Azure, Or, Gules, Argent, Orange.
	?–present	Flag of the Sri Lankan Roman Catholics	A vertical bicolor of white and yellow, with an Anuradhapura cross from the Anuradhapura era or Kotte era on the white half.

== Viceregal flags ==
Flag	Date	Use	Description
	1953–1972	Flag of the governor–general of Ceylon	A lion standing atop a St Edward's Crown, over "Ceylon".
	1948–1953	Flag of the governor–general of Ceylon	A lion standing atop a Tudor Crown, over "Ceylon".
	1875–1948	Flag of the governor of Ceylon	A Union Flag defaced with arms of the Ceylon government.

== Sri Lankan shipping company ==
Flag	Date	Use	Description
	1971–present	Ceylon Shipping Company	

== Sri Lankan yacht clubs ==
Flag	Club
	Yachting Association of Sri Lanka
	Ceylon Motor Yacht Club

== See also ==
- Flag of Sri Lanka
- Flags of the Kingdom of Kandy
- Kingdom of Kandy
- List of historical Sinhalese flags and symbols
