= G. V. Punchinilame =

Sri Lankan politician

Hon. G. V. Punchinilame

1st Chief Minister of Sabaragamuwa
- In office April 1988 – April 1989
- Governor: Noel Wimalasena
- Preceded by: Office created
- Succeeded by: Abeyratne Pilapitiya

Personal details
- Party: United National Party

G. V. Punchinilame was the 1st Chief Minister of Sabaragamuwa. He was appointed in April 1988 and was Chief Minister until April 1989. He was succeeded by Abeyratne Pilapitiya. His son is politician Susantha Punchinilame.

Political offices
Preceded by Office created	Chief Minister of Sabaragamuwa; 1988–1989	Succeeded by Abeyratne Pilapitiya
