= Tilak Ratnayake =

2nd Governor of Uva

2nd Governor of Uva
- In office February 1990 – March 1993
- Preceded by: P. C. Imbulana
- Succeeded by: Abeyratne Pilapitiya

Mayor of Kandy
- In office 1979–1990
- Preceded by: Bennet Soysa
- Succeeded by: Chandra Ranaraja

Tilak Ratnayake was the 2nd Governor of Uva. He was appointed in February 1990 succeeding P. C. Imbulana and was Governor until March 1993. He was succeeded by Abeyratne Pilapitiya.

Political offices
Preceded by P. C. Imbulana	Governor of Uva; 1990–1993	Succeeded by Abeyratne Pilapitiya
