= Flag of Shan State =

Shan State
- Proportion: 2:3
- Adopted: 12 February 1947
- Design: A horizontal triband of yellow, green and red; charged with a large white circle at the centre.

The flag of Shan State was adopted as one of the provisions of the Panglong Agreement signed on 12 February 1947, which was one of the most important stepping stones towards the independence of Myanmar.

The flag is a horizontal triband of yellow, green and red, with a white circle in the centre. Yellow represents Buddhism, which is practiced by a majority of the Shan people, green represents the rich agricultural land in Shan State, red represents the bravery of the Shan people and the white circle represents the moon, which symbolizes the Shan people's hopes for peace and stability. Other interpretations suggest that the yellow represents the colour of a monk's robe or a rice field during harvest.

== See also ==
- Flag of Myanmar
