= Flag of North Western Province =

Sri Lankan provincial flag

North Western Province
- Use: Civil and state flag
- Proportion: 2:1
- Adopted: 1987
- Design: A maroon bovine with a sun and moon symbol on a white background. On the background there 15 small eight-pointed cross-stars, and the whole surrounded by a black and maroon woven border.

The flag of North Western Province, was adopted for the North Western Province of Sri Lanka in 1987.

== Symbolism ==
The flag of the North Western Province is of a maroon lion with a sun and moon symbol on a white background. On the background there 15 small eight-pointed cross-stars. The whole flag is surrounded by a black and maroon woven border.

== See also ==
- Flag of Sri Lanka
- List of Sri Lankan flags
