= Flag of Uva Province =

Sri Lankan provincial flag

Uva Province
- Use: Civil and state flag
- Proportion: 5:4
- Adopted: 1987
- Design: A maroon and jasmine flag of a bird. It is bordered by a series of patterns.

The flag of Uva, was adopted for the Uva Province of Sri Lanka in 1987.

== Symbolism ==
The flag of the Uva is a maroon and jasmine flag of a bird. It is bordered by a series of patterns.

== See also ==
- Flag of Sri Lanka
- List of Sri Lankan flags
