= Flag of Western Province =

Sri Lankan provincial flag

Western Province
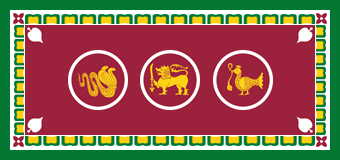
- Use: Civil and state flag
- Proportion: 17:8
- Adopted: 1987
- Design: A three headed golden snake, a golden lion with whip sword, and a golden bird with a snake in three circles on a maroon background bordered by four Bo leaves in the corners and rectangular patterns around the whole.

The flag of Western Province, was adopted for the Western Province of Sri Lanka in 1987.

== Symbolism ==
The flag of the Western Province has concentric rectangles. The outer rectangle is green with the next one being white. It has decorative green and yellow leaves and in the corners are four petalled flowers separating each side. In the dark red central rectangle, there are four Bo leaves in the corners and three white rings in the middle. Within the first is a three headed golden snake; in the central one is a golden lion with whip sword; and in the last one is a golden bird or cock with a snake.

== See also ==
- Flag of Sri Lanka
- List of Sri Lankan flags
