= Flag of Central Province =

Sri Lankan provincial flag

Central Province
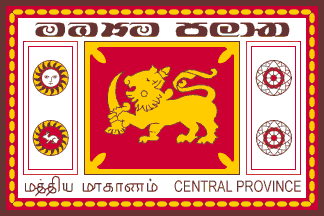
- Use: Civil and state flag
- Proportion: 2:1
- Adopted: 14 November 1987
- Design: Yellow lion in the center of a red square background of a white flag, with images of the Sun and the Moon to the left of the lion and two lotus flowers to the right.

The flag of Central Province, was adopted for the Central Province of Sri Lanka on 14 November 1987.

== Symbolism ==
The Central Province flag, like many of the other provincial flags depicts the image of a yellow lion in the center. It is on a red square background and again bordered by a yellow border. The red square background is on a white flag yet again bordered by a dotted yellow pattern and red and brown stripes. To the left of the lion are the images of the Sun and the Moon, with a face on the Sun and a rabbit on the moon.

== See also ==
- Flag of Sri Lanka
- List of Sri Lankan flags
