= Hanwella Fort =

Hanwella fort
- Hanwella, Sri Lanka

Site information
- Type: Defence fort
- Condition: Ruins

Location
- Location within Colombo District
- Coordinates: 6.909695°N 80.082496°E

Site history
- Built: 1597
- Built by: Portuguese and Dutch
- Battles/wars: Battle of Hanwella (1803)

Hanwella fort (Sinhala: හංවැල්ල බලකොටුව Hanwælla Balakotuwa; Tamil: ஹன்வெல்லைக் கோட்டை, romanized: Haṉvellaik Kōṭṭai) was located in Hanwella, Colombo, on the banks of the Kelani River. Hanwella, which means 'skin sands', was the site of an ancient ferry route across the river. Malwana fort was situated about 15 km (9.3 mi) on the other side of the Kelani River.

It is thought that the fort was originally constructed by King Mayadunne of Sitawaka, to protect the ferry crossing. The Portuguese occupied the fort and under the command of Don Jerónimo de Azevedo rebuilt it in their own style, mostly consisting of earth ramparts, in 1597. It was captured by the Dutch, who constructed a star-shaped fort using kabook (a local laterite rock), completing the work in 1684. In 1761 Kirti Sri Raja Singha, the second Nayaka king of Kandy, captured the fort and the surrounding district, massacring the garrison at the fort. The Dutch recaptured the fort in the following year.

In 1786, the fort fell under the control of the British. In 1797, shortly after the British occupied the lowlands, a rebellion broke out and sepoys of the 35th Madras Regiment were besieged within the walls of the Hanwella fort and took casualties. In 1803 during the first British-Kandyan War, Kandyan forces, under Pilima Talauva, attacked the fort which was commanded by Lieutenant Charles Mercer on 3 September. The British managed to hold off the Kandyans until reinforcements arrived under the command of Captain William Pollard on 6 September.

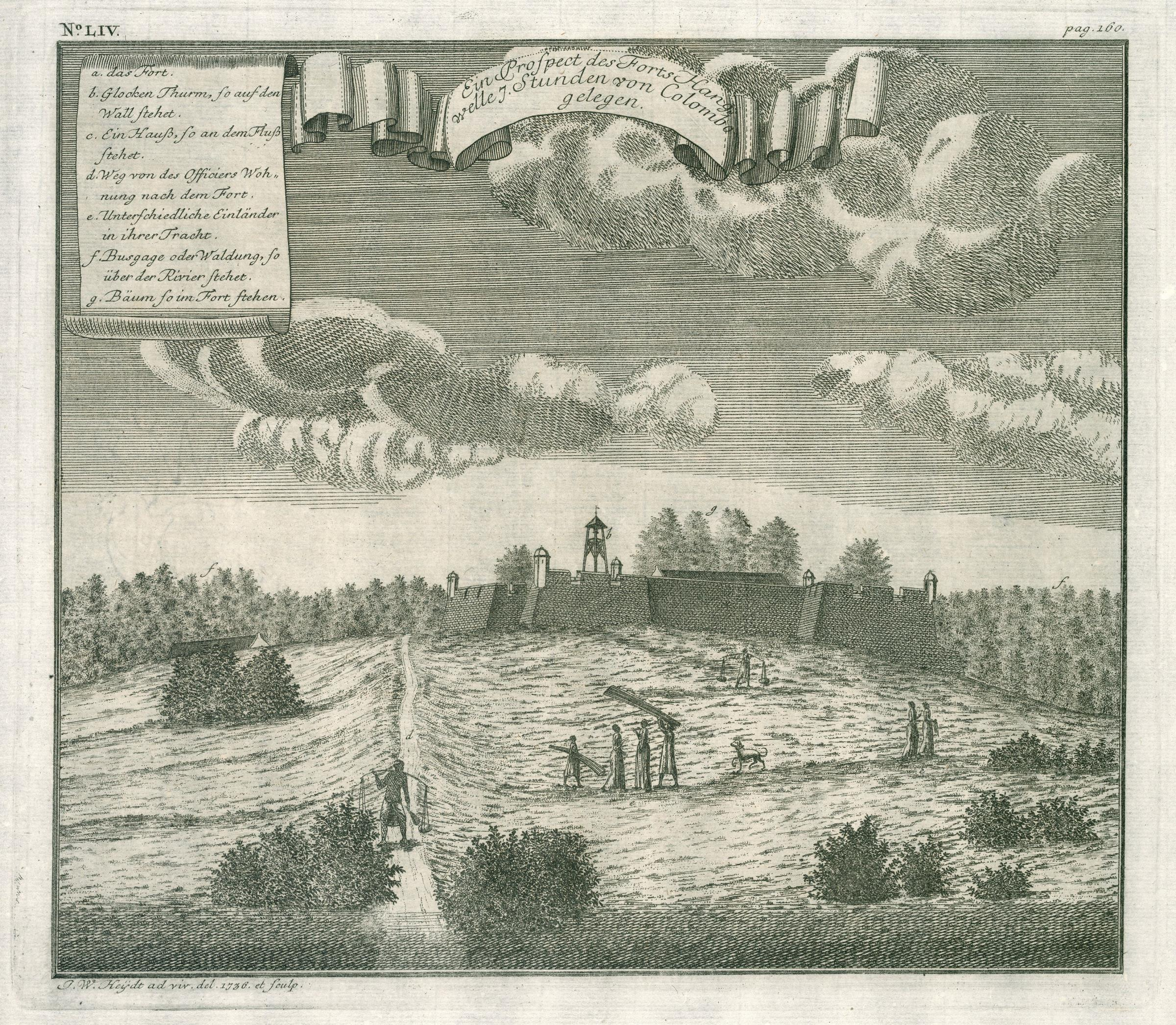
View of Hanwella Fort (1736)

Little evidence of the fort remains apart from remnants of the fortifications and the moat. A rest house is currently located on the site of the former fort. On 17 December 1875 the then Prince of Wales, Albert Edward, stopped at the rest house and planted a jack tree on the site to commemorate his visit to Sri Lanka. The tree and two stone seats, which were constructed for the royal family, can still be seen at the site.

The 1980 Sinhalese-language film Ganga Addara, directed by Sumitra Peiris, was filmed at the fort's location.
