= Flag of North Central Province =

Sri Lankan provincial flag

North Central Province
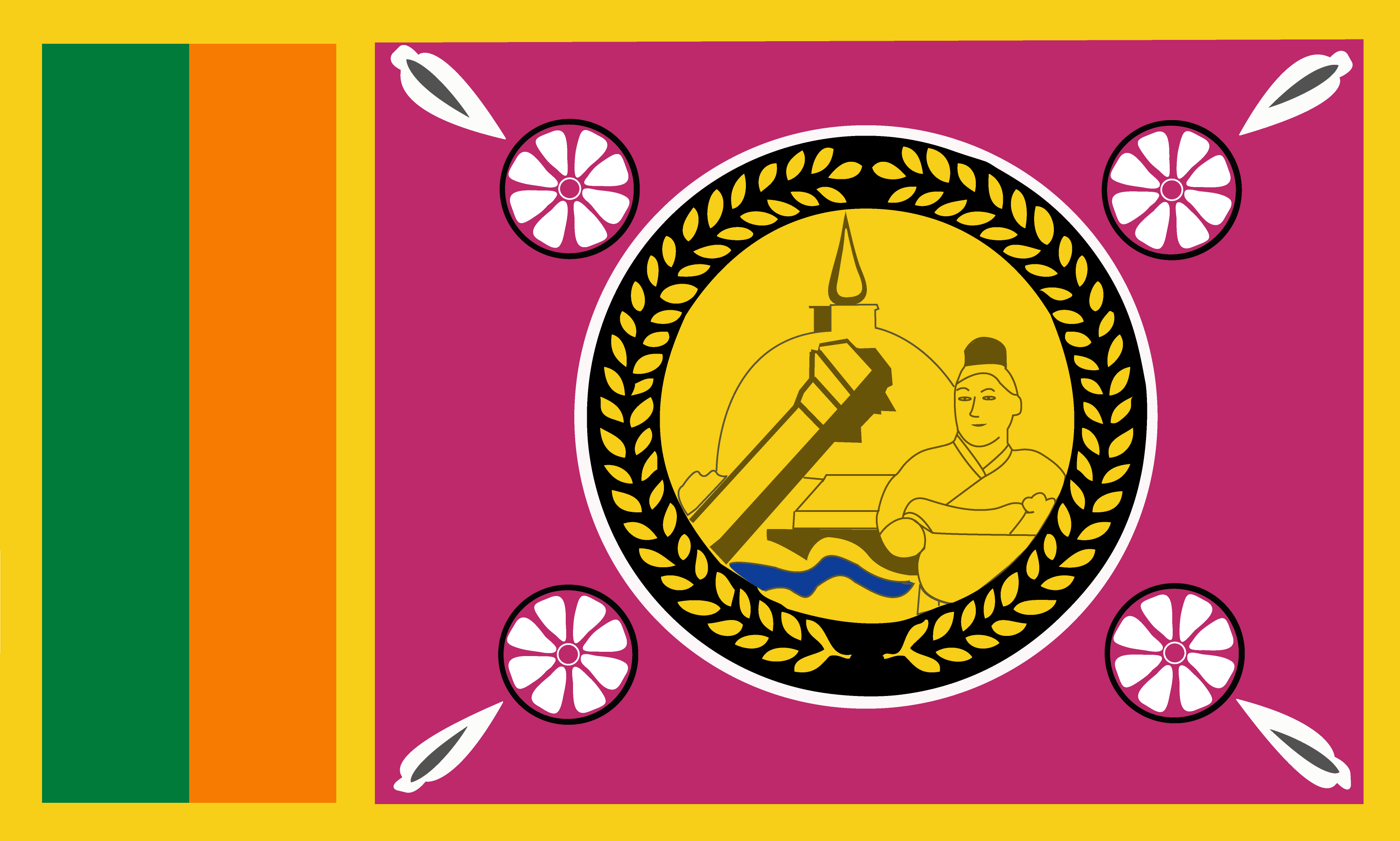
- Use: Civil and state flag
- Proportion: 2:1
- Adopted: 1987
- Design: Two vertical green and orange stripes and the four shanks and flowers in the corner of the maroon box. The centre depicts ancient ruins from the province and a statue of Parakramabahu I and a stupa.

The flag of North Central Province, was adopted for the North Central Province of Sri Lanka in 1987.

== Symbolism ==
The flag is similar to that of the national flag, with the yellow border, the two vertical green and orange stripes and the four shanks and flowers in the corner of the maroon box. The centre however depicts ancient ruins from the North Central Province such as a statue of Parakramabahu I of Sri Lanka and an Ancient Sri Lankan stupa.

== See also ==
- Flag of Sri Lanka
- List of Sri Lankan flags
