= Flag of Southern Province =

Sri Lankan provincial flag

Southern Province
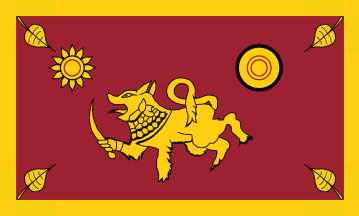
- Use: Civil and state flag
- Proportion: 3:2
- Adopted: 1987
- Design: A lion in the center holding a sword on a maroon background, surrounded by a yellow border and bo leaves to the corners. The flag also depicts the Sun and the Moon either side of the lion.

The flag of Southern Province, was adopted for the Southern Province of Sri Lanka in 1987.

== Symbolism ==
The design of the flag of the Southern Province is similar to that of the national flag, with a golden lion jumping in the center holding a sword on a maroon background, surrounded by a yellow borderwith stix wafers and bo leaves to the corners. The flag also depicts the Sun and the Moon either side of the lion.

== See also ==
- Flag of Sri Lanka
- List of Sri Lankan flags
