= Flag of Northern Province =

Sri Lankan provincial flag

Northern Province
- Use: Civil and state flag
- Proportion: 1:2
- Adopted: 22 May 2007
- Design: A red, white, green tricolour with the sun depicted in the centre, surrounded by a blue border.

The flag of Northern Province was adopted for the Northern Province of Sri Lanka on 22 May 2007.

== History ==
With the Supreme Court ruling that by 2007 the 1987 order of merging the two provinces, under the Indo-Sri Lanka Accord, Northern and Eastern was illegal and therefore the two provinces must be administered separately. This meant two separate flags for the Northern and Eastern provinces.

The Northern Province flag was unveiled along with the flag of Eastern Province in Trincomalee, in May 2007. The governor of the Eastern Province Rear Admiral Mohan Wijewickrama, also at the time the acting governor of the Northern Province, handed over the two flags to each of the province's respective council's chief secretary, S. Rangarajah of the North and Herath Abeyeweera of the East, at a ceremony at the Governor's Secretariat.

== Symbolism ==
The flag has a symbol of the Sun in the middle of the flag, indicating synergy of power and natural energy sources of the province. It has three vertical stripes, red indicating labour and industriousness, white fraternity, peace and co-existence and green for the greenery and agriculture in the province. The flag is surrounded by a blue border symbolising the north's ocean resource.

The size of the flag is 126 X 72 cm.

== See also ==
- Flag of Sri Lanka
- List of Sri Lankan flags
