= Dumbara =

Dumbara is a town located in the Ratnapura District, Sri Lanka. It has a long history of mining activities. It is where the first commercial operating graphite mine in the country, opening in 1840.
