= Flag of Eastern Province =

Sri Lankan provincial flag

Eastern Province
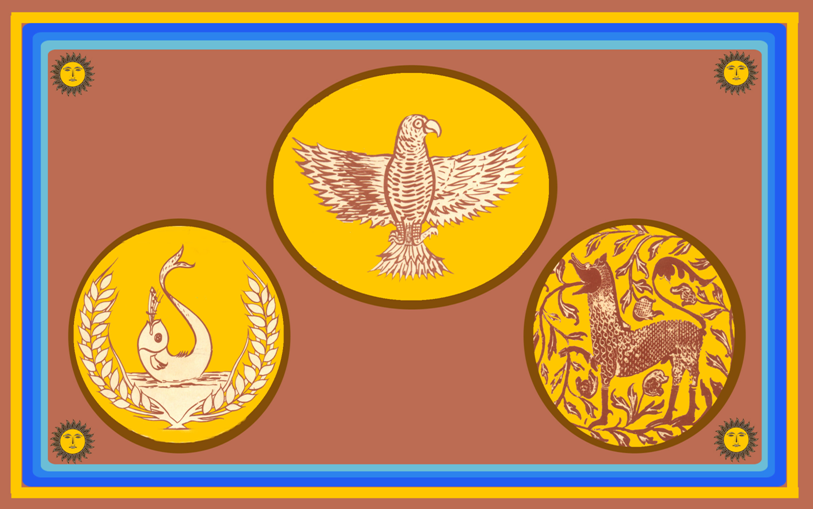
- Use: Civil and state flag
- Proportion: 2:3
- Adopted: 22 May 2007
- Design: An eagle, a fish and a lion on circular backgrounds representing the three districts of the province, bordered by a series of blue and yellow lines on a brown background, with a sun in each corner.

The flag of Eastern Province, was adopted for the Eastern Province of Sri Lanka on 22 May 2007.

== History ==
With the Supreme Court ruling that by 2007 the 1987 order of merging the two provinces, under the Indo-Sri Lanka Accord, Northern and Eastern was illegal and therefore the two provinces must be administered separately. This meant two separate flags for the Northern and Eastern provinces.

The Eastern Province flag was unveiled along with the flag of Northern Province in Trincomalee, in May 2007. The governor of the Eastern Province Rear Admiral Mohan Wijewickrema, also at the time the acting governor of the Northern Province, handed over the two flags to each of the province's respective council's chief secretary, S. Rangarajah of the North and Herath Abeyeweera of the East, at a ceremony at the Governor's Secretariat.

== Symbolism ==
The three symbols on the Eastern Province flag symbolises the three districts of the province. The eagle symbolises Trincomalee, the fish Batticaloa and the lion Ampara.

=== Controversy ===
The Sri Lanka Muslim Congress, the major political party for the Sri Lankan Moors, says that the new Eastern Province flag design does not represent the Muslim community. Hassan Ali, the Deputy Minister of Supplementary Crops Development, raised the issue at the adjournment debate in the House not accepting the new flag that did not symbolize the Muslim community.

== See also ==
- Flag of Sri Lanka
- List of Sri Lankan flags
