= Flag of Sabaragamuwa Province =

Sri Lankan provincial flag

Sabaragamuwa Province
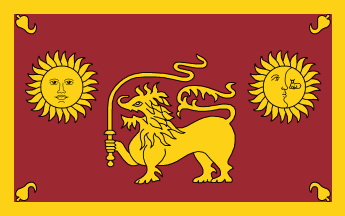
- Use: Civil and state flag
- Proportion: 5:3
- Adopted: 1987
- Design: A dark red flag boarded by yellow edges with four yellow bo leaves in the corners and in the middle is a lion holding a whip, there are also a sun and a moon either side of the lion.

The flag of Sabaragamuwa Province was adopted for the Sabaragamuwa Province of Sri Lanka in 1987.

== Symbolism ==
The flag of the Sabaragamuwa is a dark red flag boarded by yellow edges, like the Sri Lankan Flag it has four yellow bo leaves in the corners and in the middle is a lion holding a whip, there are also a sun and a moon either side of the lion.

== See also ==
- Flag of Sri Lanka
- List of Sri Lankan flags
