= Flag of Sri Lanka =

Democratic Socialist Republic of Sri Lanka
- Sinha Flag; Lion Flag
- Use: Civil and state flag, civil ensign
- Proportion: 1:2
- Adopted: 22 May 1972
- Design: Two fields separated by a golden border: the smaller hoist-side field has only two vertical halves of teal and orange and the larger fly-side field is the maroon field depicting the golden lion holding a kastane sword in its right fore paw in the centre and four bo tree (bodhi tree) leaves on each corner, and the golden border around the entire flag extends in between the two separate fields, all bordering together.
- Designed by: Don Stephen Senanayake
- Use: Auxiliary ensign used by merchant ship commanded by reserve naval officer
- Proportion: 1:2
- Adopted: 1972
- Design: A blue field with the flag of Sri Lanka in the canton.
- Use: President's Colour
- Proportion: 1:2
- Adopted: 1972
- Design: A defaced flag of Sri Lanka with the Emblem of Sri Lanka
- Use: Naval ensign
- Proportion: 1:2
- Adopted: 1972
- Design: A white field with the flag of Sri Lanka in the canton.
- Use: Civil ensign
- Proportion: 1:2
- Adopted: 1972
- Design: A red field with the flag of Sri Lanka in the canton.
- Use: Air Force ensign
- Proportion: 1:2
- Adopted: 2010
- Design: A defaced sky-blue ensign with the flag of Sri Lanka in the canton and Air Force roundel.

The national flag of Sri Lanka, also called the Singha Flag or Lion Flag (Sinhala: සිංහ ජාතික කොඩිය, romanised: siṁha jātika koḍiya, Tamil: சிங்க தேசியக் கொடி, romanised: ciṅkak koṭi), consists of a golden lion holding a kastane sword in its right fore-paw in a maroon background with four gold bo leaves, one in each corner. This is bordered by gold, and to its left are two vertical stripes of equal size in teal and orange, with the orange stripe closest to the lion.

The lion and the maroon background represent the Sinhalese race, while the saffron border and four bo leaves represent the concepts of meththa, karuṇā, muditā and upecka respectively. The stripes represent the country's two largest minority ethnicities, with the orange stripe representing the Tamils inhabitants—namely the Sri Lankan Tamils and the Indian Tamils of Sri Lanka—and the green stripe representing the Sri Lankan Moors (Muslims of Sri Lanka). The golden yellow border is a catch-all representing the various minority communities of the country.

== History ==
=== Monarchical Sri Lanka ===
As depicted on a mural in Cave no. 2 at Dambulla Viharaya, King Dutugemunu on his campaign against Elara (an invading South Indian ruler in 162 BC) is depicted with a banner containing a lion figure carrying a sword in its right forepaw, a symbol of the Sun and one of the Moon. This flag was known as the only ancient representation of the lion flag of the Sinhalese but in 1957, the lion figure on it was defaced by a vandal.

Flags of Sri Lanka (Until 1815)

Flag of Dutugamunu, Anuradhapura period

Flag of the Kingdom of Gampola, c. 1341–1395

Flag of the Kingdom of Kotte, c. 1395–1597

Flag of Kingdom of Raigama, c. 1521-1538

Flag of Kingdom of Sitawaka, c. 1521-1594

Flag of the Kingdom of Kandy, c. 1798–1815

=== British colonial period ===
This basic design continued to be in use until 1815, when the Kandyan Convention ended the reign of the country's last native monarch, Sri Vikrama Rajasinha, replacing his royal standard (used as the Flag of the Kingdom of Kandy) with the Union Flag as the nation's accepted flag. The colonial government of British Ceylon later established its own flag, while Sri Vikrama Rajasinha's standard was taken to England and kept at the Royal Hospital Chelsea.

Flags of Sri Lanka (1815-1948)

Colonial flag of British Ceylon, 1815–1875

Colonial flag of British Ceylon, 1875–1948

=== Sri Lanka (since 1948) ===
As the independence movement in Sri Lanka gained strength in the early 20th century, E. W. Perera and D. R. Wijewardena discovered the original Lioness Flag in Chelsea. A photo of it was published in Dinamina, in a special edition marking a century since the loss of self-rule and Sri Lankan independence. The flag provoked much interest from the public who, for the first time since the fall of the Kandyan Kingdom, had seen its actual design.

Member of Parliament for Batticaloa, Mudaliyar A. Sinnalebbe, suggested in Parliament on January 16, 1948, that the Lion Flag should be accepted as the national flag. In 1948, the flag was adopted as the national flag of the Dominion of Ceylon, undergoing two changes: one in 1953 and a redesign in 1972. A notable feature of the 1972 adaptation of the Kandyan standard was the replacement of the four spearheads at the flag's corners by four bo leaves, a design choice made under the direction of Nissanka Wijeyeratne, Permanent Secretary to the Ministry of Cultural Affairs and Chairman of the National Emblem and Flag Design Committee.

Flags of Sri Lanka (since 1948)

Flag of the Dominion of Ceylon, 1948–1951

Flag of the Dominion of Ceylon (similar to current), 1951–1972

== Symbolism ==
According to the Mahavamsa, the historical chronicle of Sri Lanka, the origin of the Sinhalese people; the island’s majority ethnic group is traced to Prince Vijaya. The chronicle records that his father, King Sinhabahu was the son of a powerful man named Sinha (often interpreted as a lion) and Princess Suppadevi of the Vanga kingdom in northern India. With the arrival of Prince Vijaya and subsequent migrations from northern India, these groups are believed to have intermixed with the Vadda people of the island, giving rise to the Sinhalese people. As the Mahavamsa symbolically associates Sinha with a lion representing strength, the lion came to embody the identity and valour of the Sinhalese people.

Historical accounts also suggest that Prince Vijaya is said to have raised a lion flag upon his landing at Tambapanni Ancient Port. Accordingly, the lion symbol has been used since ancient times, and today it remains a central feature of the national flag of Sri Lanka representing the Sinhalese nation. The national flag of Sri Lanka represents the country and its heritage as a rallying device. Most symbols in the flag have been given distinctive meanings.

Symbol	Represents
The Lion	The strength of the Nation
The bo leaves	The four Buddhist virtues of loving-kindness, compassion, sympathetic joy and equanimity
The sword of the lion	The sovereignty of the nation
The curly hair on the lion's head	Religious observance, wisdom and meditation
The eight hairs on the lion's tail	The Noble Eightfold Path
The beard of the lion	Purity of words
The handle of the sword	The classical elements of water, fire, air and earth
The nose of the lion	Intelligence
The two front paws of the lion	Purity in handling wealth
Orange stripe	The Tamil ethnicity (including the Hill Country Tamils of Indian ancestry)
Green stripe	The Moor ethnicity
Saffron border	Buddhism and unity among the people
The maroon background	The Sinhala ethnicity
The golden yellow border	Other minority communities of Sri Lanka, such as the Malays, the Burghers, the Indigenous Veddas, the Kaffirs and, the Sri Lankan Chinese, who migrated to Sri Lanka during the 17th–19th centuries.

== Colours ==
The colours of the national flag are specified in the document "SLS 1: 2020: Specification for the National Flag of the Democratic Socialist Republic of Sri Lanka".

Colours scheme	Gold	Maroon	Orange	Teal
CMYK	0-26-90-3	0-80-66-42	0-48-100-13	100-0-9-63
HEX	#F7B718	#941E32	#DF7500	#005F56
RGB	247-183-24	148-30-50	223-117-0	0-95-86
Pantone	14-0957 TCX	19-1863 TCX	16-1164 TCX	18-5322 TCX

== Gallery ==
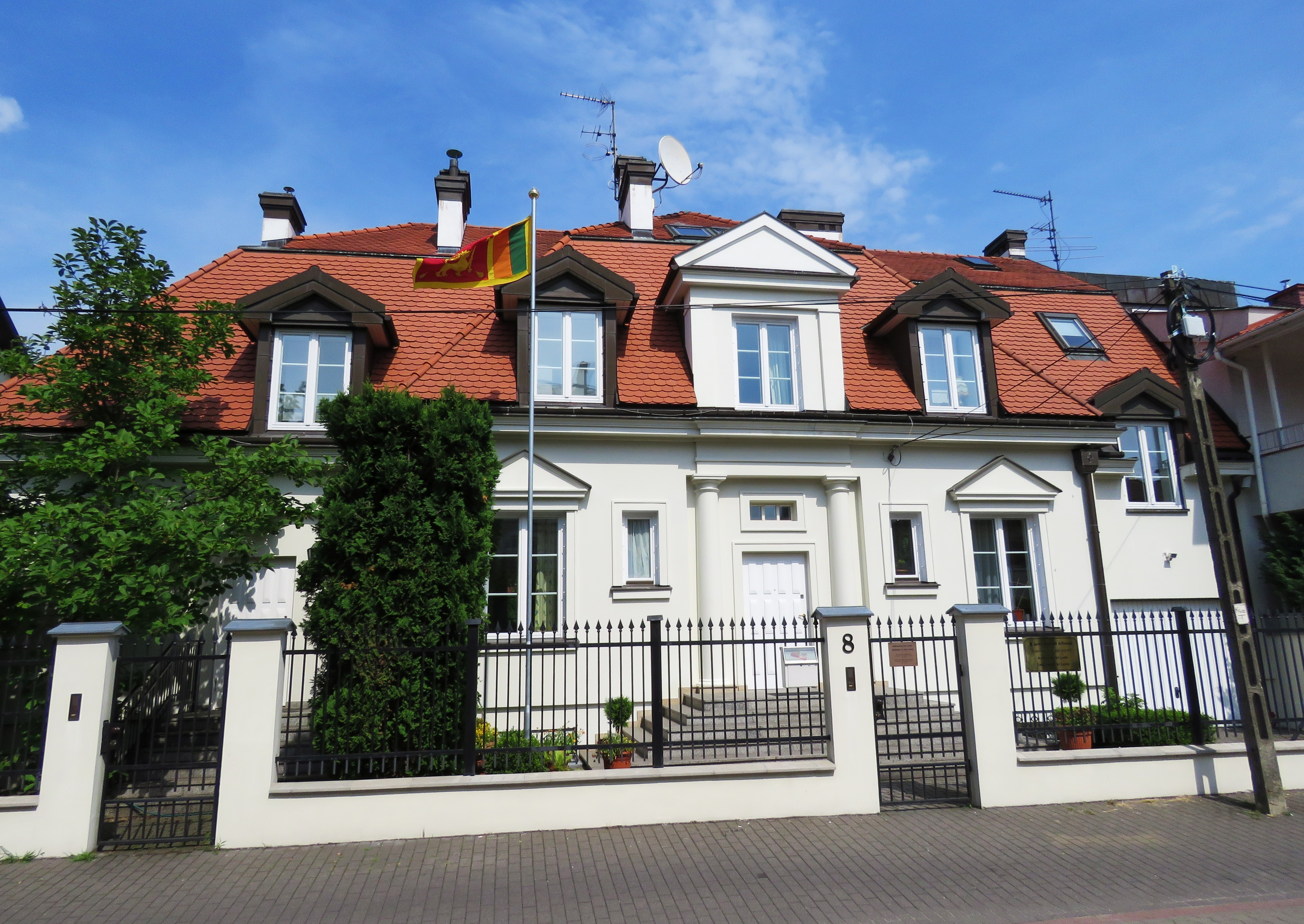
Flown at the Embassy in Warsaw

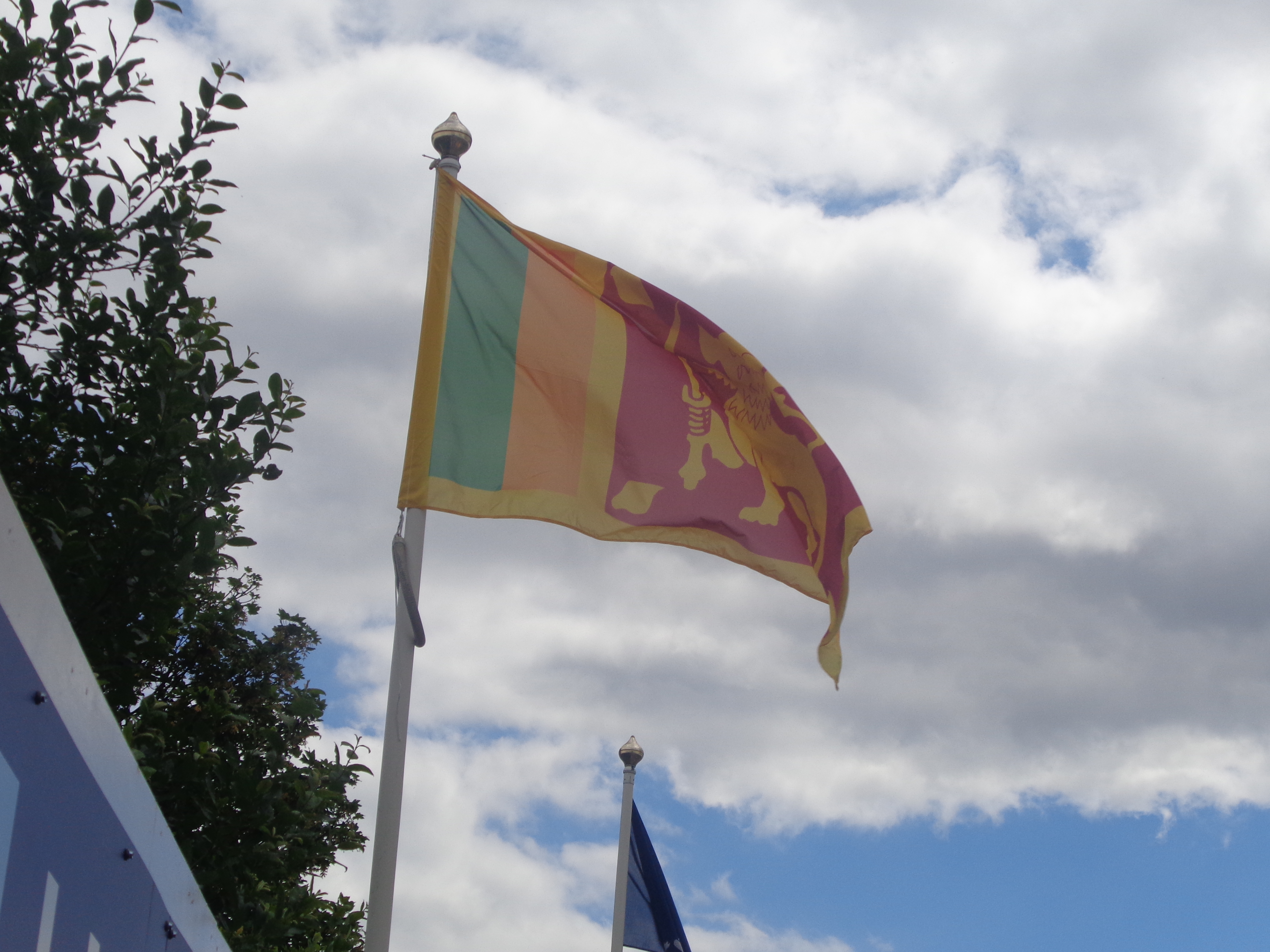
Displayed outside a stadium, in Leeds, UK

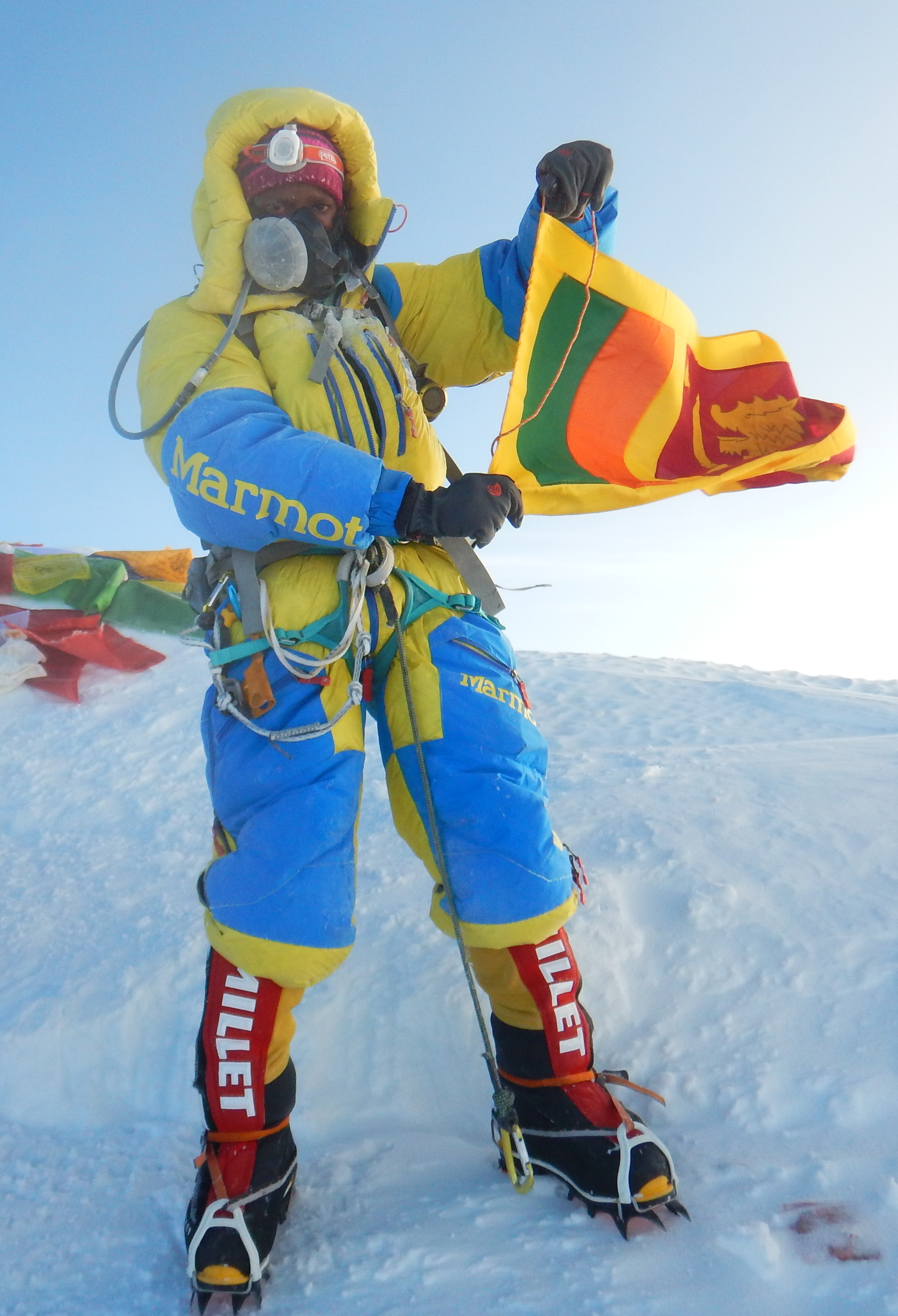
Mountaineer Jayanthi Kuru-Utumpala with Sri Lankan flag atop Mount Everest

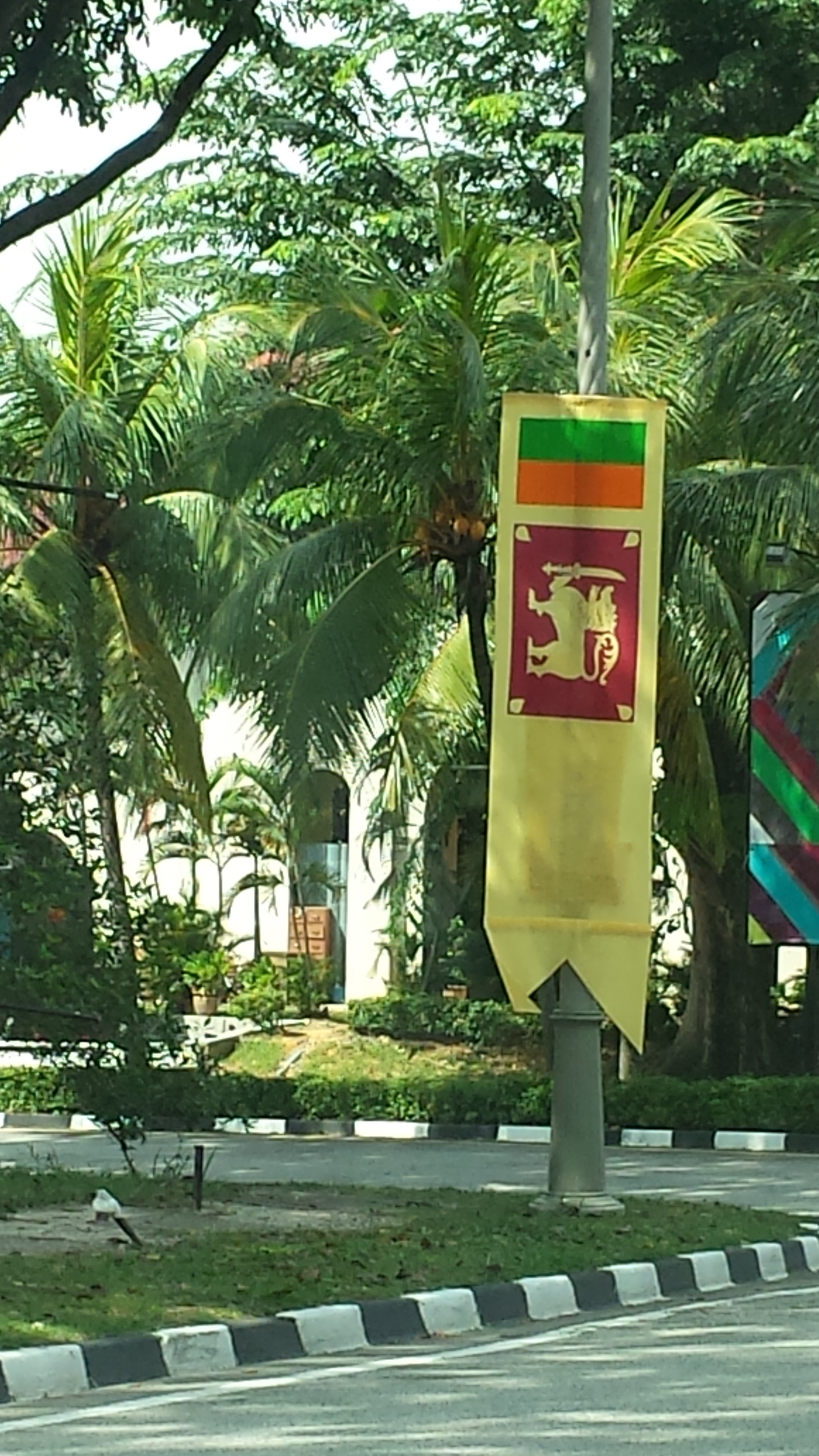
Hung vertically, along a street in Malaysia

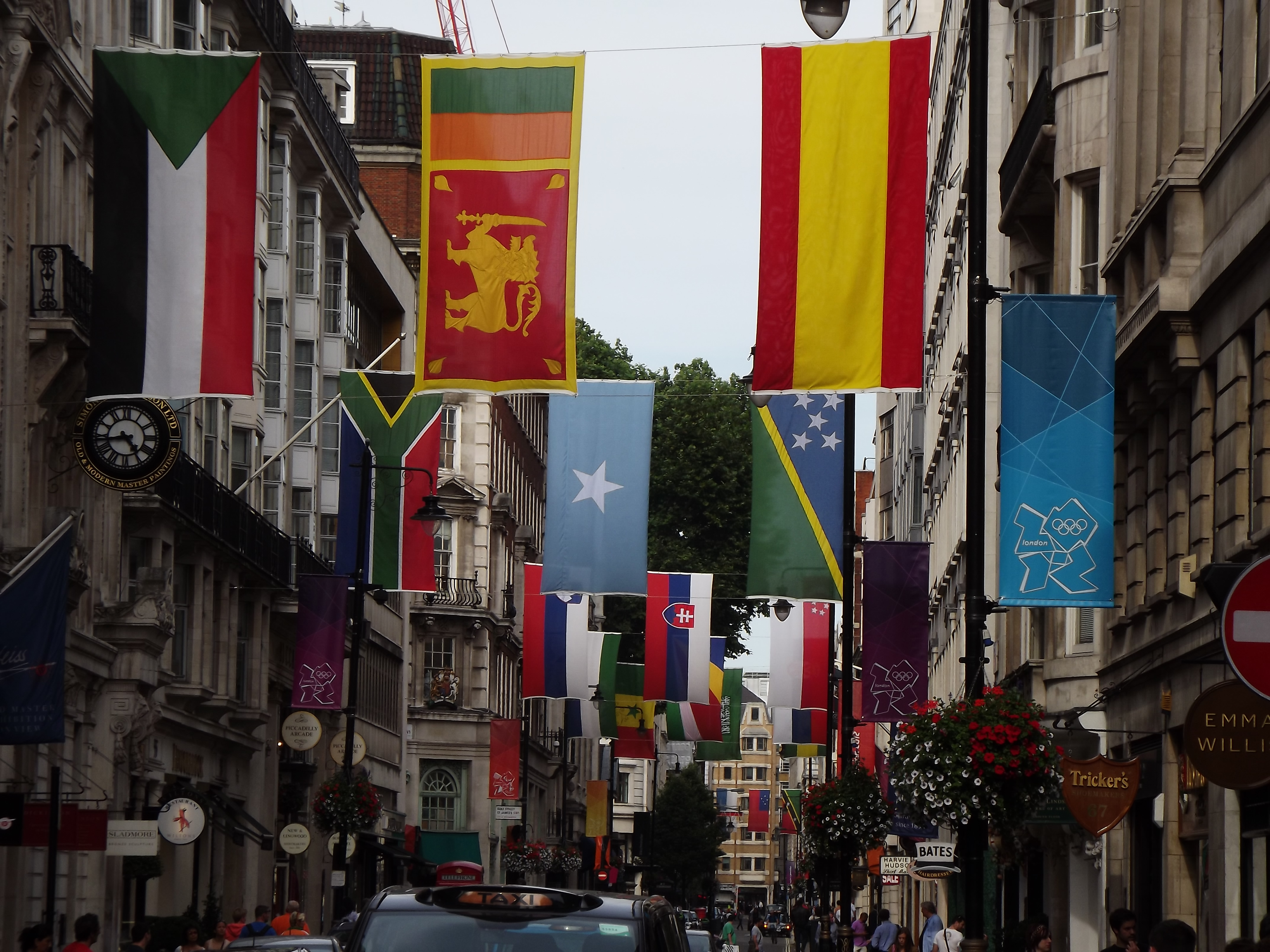
Displayed along other flags during the 2012 Summer Olympics in London

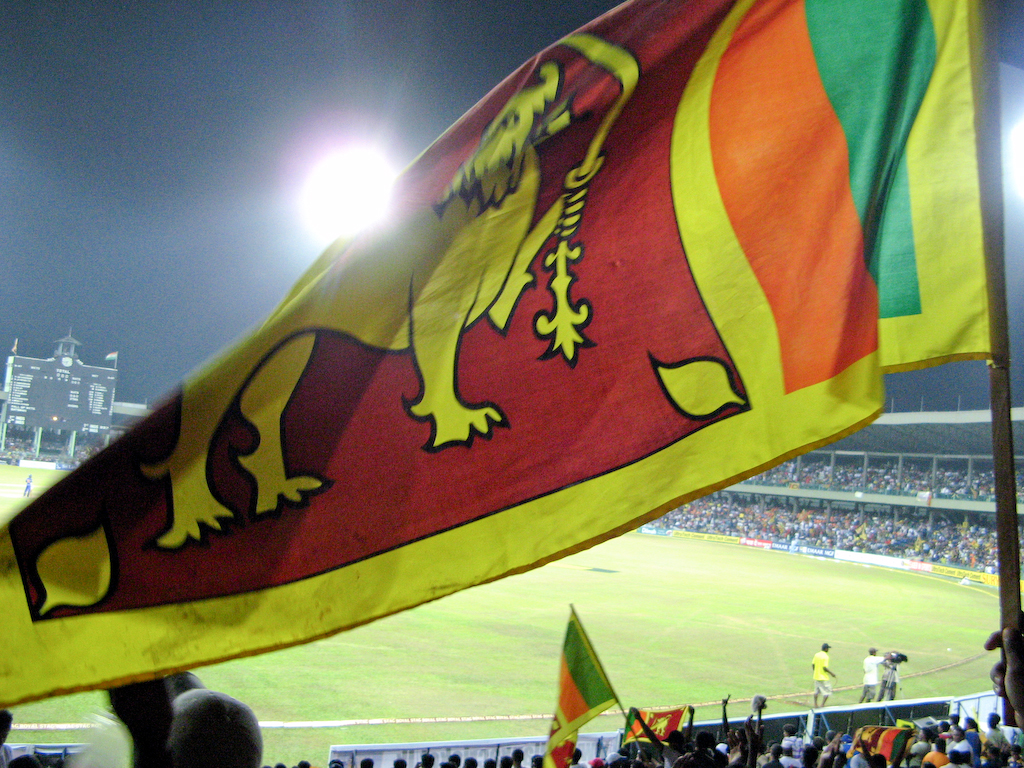
Used at a sports event

== See also ==
- List of Sri Lankan flags
- Flags of the Kingdom of Kandy
- Emblem of Sri Lanka
- Flag of Veneto
