= List of vexillologists =

List of persons known for their study or creation of flags

This is a list of vexillologists.

- Grace Rogers Cooper (1924–2004), former curator of textiles, Smithsonian Institution; former president (1983-1986) and first female president of NAVA; Whitney Smith Fellow (NAVA)(for an outstanding contribution to North American vexillology); and author, among other publications, of Thirteen-Star Flags: Keys to Identification
- William Crampton (1936–1997), founder of the Flag Institute; recipient of FIAV's 1991 Vexillon; former secretary-general for congresses (1983–1989), President (1993–1997), Fellow, and Laureate of FIAV; and author of many editions of Flags of the World
- Peter Edwards (1931–2019), founder and president of the Burgee Data Archives
- Andriy Grechylo, Ukrainian heraldist and vexillologist and Fellow of FIAV
- Ottfried Neubecker (1908–1992), German vexillologist; former president (1973–1981), secretary-general (1981–1983), Fellow, and Laureate of FIAV; and author in 1939 of the German navy Flaggenbuch
- William Gordon Perrin (1874–1931), British RAF and naval officer, Librarian of the Admiralty, and author of British Flags: Their Early History, and Their Development at Sea, and of Nelson's Signals in which he established that the flags which had been accepted as denoting Nelson's historic signal at Trafalgar were incorrect.
- George H. Preble (1816–1885), American naval admiral and author in 1872 of History of the American Flag
- Wallace Rice (1859–1939), vexillographer
- Whitney Smith (1940–2016), founder of the Flag Research Center; editor of the Flag Bulletin; co-founder, secretary-general (1969–1981, 1983–1991), secretary-general for Congresses (1981–1983), founder, former president (1967–1977), president emeritus, and honorary member of NAVA; FIAV Laureate and Fellow; recipient of FIAV's 2007 Vexillon; Whitney Smith Fellow (NAVA)(for an outstanding contribution to North American vexillology); recipient, NAVA's Captain William Driver Award (1983) for best paper delivered at an annual meeting; Fellow, Vexillological Association of the State of Texas; author, among other flag books, of Flags Through the Ages and Across the World, The Flag Book of the United States, and The American Flag: Two Centuries of Concord & Conflict; and originator, in 1957, of the word vexillology to describe the scholarly study of flags.
- Bishop D. Ralph Spence (born 1942), FRHSC is a Canadian retired Anglican bishop and vexillographer. He has designed the flags of a number of municipalities in Ontario, Canada - including Hamilton, Burlington, St. Catherine's, & Thorold, ON. An avid flag collector, he has donated much of his 3000 item collection to museums and archives in Canada.
- Philip Tibbetts, HM March Pursuivant Extraordinary and as the first person to hold the position of Honorary Vexillologist to the Court of the Lord Lyon at The Court of the Lord Lyon a rare example of a dedicated state mandated vexillologist.
- Alfred Znamierowski (1940–2019), Polish-born founder of the Flag Design Center; recipient of FIAV's 2003 Vexillon; Fellow of FIAV; and author of The World Encyclopedia of Flags

== See also ==
- Vexillology
- Vexillography
