= Vexillography =

Art and practice of designing flags

Parts of a flag, labeled.

Vexillography (/ˌvɛksɪˈlɒɡrəfi/ VEK-sih-LOG-rə-fee) is the art and practice of designing flags; a person who designs flags is a vexillographer. Vexillography is allied with vexillology, the scholarly study of flags, but is not synonymous with that discipline.

== Background of flag design ==
Flag designs exhibit a number of regularities, arising from a variety of practical concerns, historical circumstances, and cultural prescriptions that have shaped and continue to shape their evolution.

Vexillographers face the necessity for the design to be manufactured (and often mass-produced) into or onto a piece of cloth, which will subsequently be hoisted aloft in the outdoors to represent an organization, individual, idea, or group. In this respect, flag design departs considerably from logo design: logos are predominantly still images suitable for reading off a page, screen, or billboard; while flags are alternately draped and fluttering images - visible from a variety of distances and angles (including the reverse). The prevalence of simple bold colors and shapes in flag design attests to these practical issues.

Flag design has a history, and new designs often refer back to previous designs, effectively quoting, elaborating, or commenting upon them. Families of current flags may derive from a few common ancestors - as in the cases of the Pan-African colours, the Pan-Arab colors, the Pan-Slavic colors, the Nordic Cross flag and the Ottoman flag.

Certain cultures prescribe the proper design of their own flags, through heraldic or other authoritative systems. Prescription may be based on religious principles: see, for example, Islamic flags. Vexillographers have begun to articulate design principles, such as those jointly published by the North American Vexillological Association and the Flag Institute in their Guiding Principles of Flag Design.

== Prominent vexillographers ==
- Columbano Bordalo Pinheiro, designer of the flag of Portugal
- Luis and Sabino Arana, designers of the Ikurriña (the flag of the Basque Country)
- Graham Bartram, designer of the flag of Tristan da Cunha and others
- Manuel Belgrano, designer of the flag of Argentina
- Frederick 'Fred' Brownell, designer of the flags of South Africa and Namibia
- Ron Cobb, designer of the American Ecology Flag
- John Eisenmann, designer of the flag of the U.S. state of Ohio
- Mohamed Hamzah, designer of the flag of Malaya
- Quamrul Hassan, designer of the flag of Bangladesh
- Cederic Herbert, designer of the flag of the short-lived Zimbabwe Rhodesia and the current flag of Zimbabwe
- Francis Hopkinson, generally acknowledged designer of the American flag
- Friedensreich Hundertwasser, designer of a koru flag, among others
- Susan K. Huhume, designer of the flag of Papua New Guinea
- Sharif Hussein, designer of the flag of the Arab Revolt
- James I of England, designer of the first flag of Great Britain
- Syed Amir-uddin Kedwaii, designer of the flag of Pakistan
- Lu Haodong, designer of the Blue Sky with a White Sun flag of the Republic of China
- Nicola Marschall, designer of the "Stars and Bars", the First National Flag of the Confederate States of America
- John McConnell, designer of a flag of the Earth
- Fredrik Meltzer, designer of the flag of Norway
- Raimundo Teixeira Mendes, designer of the flag of Brazil
- William Porcher Miles, designer of the battle flag of the Confederate States of America
- Francisco de Miranda, designer of the flag of Venezuela, upon which the present flags of Colombia and Ecuador are based.
- Theodosia Okoh, designer of the flag of Ghana
- Christopher Pratt, designer of the flag of the Canadian province of Newfoundland and Labrador
- Orren Randolph Smith, citizen of North Carolina who is co-credited as being the father of the "Stars and Bars" flag, along with Nicola Marschall.
- Whitney Smith, designer of the flag of Guyana and other flags
- George Stanley, designer of the flag of Canada
- Joaquín Suárez, designer of the flag of Uruguay
- Pingali Venkayya, designer of the flag of India
- Robert Watt, designer of the flag of Vancouver, British Columbia, Canada
- Oliver Wolcott Jr., designer of the flag of the United States Customs Service
- Zeng Liansong, designer of the flag of the People's Republic of China
- İsmet Güney, designer of the flag of Cyprus
- Nguyen Huu Tien, designer of the flag of Vietnam
- Gilbert Baker, designer of the rainbow flag symbol of the LGBT Movement
- Alexander Baretich, designer of the Cascadian bioregional flag AKA Doug flag
- Ralph Eugene Diffendorfer, co-designer of the Christian Flag
- Christopher Gadsden, designer of the Gadsden flag
- Monica Helms, designer of the Transgender flag
- Adolf Hitler, designer of the flag of Nazi Germany, the Reichskriegsflagge and his personal standard
- Betsy Ross, designer, according to legend, of the American flag during the American Revolution
- Theodore Sizer, designed of the flag of St. Louis
- Gerard Slevin, former Chief Herald of Ireland reputed to have helped design the flag of Europe.
- Emilio Aguinaldo, 1st president of the Republic of the Philippines, along with the designer of the countries' flag.
