= Pale (heraldry) =

Vertical stripe

Argent a pale gules

In heraldry and vexillology, a pale is a charge consisting of a band running vertically down the centre of a shield or flag. Writers broadly agree that the width of the pale ranges from about one-fifth to about one-third of the width of the shield, but this width is not fixed. A narrow pale is more likely if it is uncharged, that is, if it does not have other objects placed on it. If charged, the pale is typically wider to allow room for the objects depicted there.

The pale is one of the ordinaries in heraldry, along with the bend, chevron, fess, and chief. There are several other ordinaries and sub-ordinaries.

The word pale originally referred to a picket (a piece of wood much taller than it is wide such as is used to build a picket fence) and it is from the resemblance to this that the heraldic pale derives its name (see 'pale', English: Etymology 2 on Wiktionary).

== Derived terms ==
pallet
In British heraldry when two or more pales appear on a field, they are conventionally termed pallets. While a pallet is generally classified as a diminutive of the pale, the pallets on a shield of two pallets may be no narrower than the pale on another where it has been narrowed to accommodate other charges on either side.
paly
A shield with numerous pales may be termed paly, especially in early heraldry, though this term is now properly reserved to describe a variation of the field.
in pale
In pale refers to the appearance of several items on the shield being lined up in the direction of a pale.
palewise
A charge palewise is vertical like a pale.
party per pale
A shield party per pale is divided into two parts by a single line which runs in the direction of a pale.

== Special cases ==
A pale may be couped ("cut off" at either end, and so not reaching the top or bottom of the shield). The special term in Canadian heraldry for a couped pale is "a pale retrait" (this also applies to pallets; see below). If couped at the bottom it is blazoned as "a pale retrait in base".

The Canadian pale is a broad pale occupying half the width of the field. On a 1:2 field the pale is square in shape. A flag with this charge or division of the field was suggested for the flag of Canada by Canadian Prime Minister Lester Pearson's parliamentary secretary, John Matheson, to fellow members of the 1964 Parliamentary flag committee. Matheson took inspiration from a proposal circulated by Montréal designer Georg Bist. Bist was offering his proposal as a suggested revision of Pearson and designer and heraldist Alan Beddoe's original proposal for the flag of Canada, dubbed the 'Pearson pennant'. The term for a pale of this proportion was suggested by Sir Conrad Swan, and used when Elizabeth II proclaimed the new flag on 28 January 1965.

== Gallery ==
Two pallets

Pale endorsed

Field paly

Party per pale

Barry per pale counterchanged

Tierced per pale

Charges in pale

Pale fitchy

Pale retrait (French heraldry)

Demi-pale abased (French heraldry)

Pallet couped

Chef-pal (French 'chief-pale' )

Fasce-pal (French 'fess-pale' )

== On flags ==
=== Pale ===
Flag of Nigeria

Flag of Peru
(civil)

Flag of Barbados

Flag of Guatemala

Flag of Mongolia

==== Canadian pale ====
Flag of Canada

=== Tierced per pale ===
Flag of the Kingdom of Belgium

Flag of the Republic of Chad

Flag of the Republic of Côte d'Ivoire

Flag of the French Republic

Flag of the Republic of Guinea

Flag of the Republic of Ireland

Flag of the Republic of Italy

Flag of the Republic of Mali

Flag of the Republic of Romania

Flag of Afghanistan (former, 2013–2021)

Flag of Cameroon

Flag of the United Mexican States

Flag of the Republic of Moldova

Flag of the Republic of Senegal

==== Tierced per broad pale ====
Flag of Andorra

Flag of Saint Vincent and the Grenadines

Flag of Iowa, USA

=== Per pale ===
Flag of Algeria

Flag of Malta

Flag of Vatican City

==== Per pale counterchanged ====
Flag of the Canadian Flag Association

Flag of Gardabani Municipality, Georgia

Flag of Kharagauli Municipality, Georgia

Flag of Naxxar, Malta

Flag of Sliema, Malta

Flag of Alameda, California, USA

=== Pallets and fields paly ===
Flag of Berlaar, Belgium (Azure, three pallets argent)

Flag of Provence, France (Or, four pallets gules)

Ensign of the United States Power Squadrons (Azure, six pallets argent)

Flag of the Sons of Liberty (Gules, four pallets argent)

Ensign of the United States Coast Guard (Paly of fourteen, gules and argent)

United Nations Honour Flag (aka 'Four Freedoms Flag' , 1943-1948, Argent, four pallets couped gules)

Flag of the government of the Netherlands (pallet retrait)

==== Tierced per pallet ====
Flag of Kano State, Nigeria

Flag of Khabarovsk, Khabarovsk Krai, Russia

=== Endorses ===
Flag of the Nordic Flag Society (two endorses surmounted)

A proposed flag of the Finno-Ugric peoples (cross composed of endorses and barrulets interlaced)

=== Variations of charge ===
==== Fimbriated ====
Flag of Mississippi, USA (broad pale fimbriated)

==== Endorsed ====
Flag of Haute-Marne, France (pallet argent endorsed or potenty-counter-potenty)

=== Lines of partition ===
Flag of Los Angeles, California, USA (tierced per pale indented)

Flag of Radoviš Municipality, North Macedonia (per pale embattled)

Flag of Guaynabo, Puerto Rico (per pale embattled)

Flag of Laekvere Parish, Estonia (per pale fir-twigged/sprigged/havukoro/sapinagy)

=== Charges in pale ===
Banner of the Lordship of Ireland (1386–1541)

Flag of Essex, England, United Kingdom

Flag of Haugesund, Rogaland County, Norway

Flag of the Democratic Republic of the Congo (former, 1997–2003)

Jack of the Canadian Coast Guard

=== Charges palewise ===
Flag of the City of London, United Kingdom

Flag of Portsmouth, England, United Kingdom

==== Charges palewise inverted ====
Flag of Peterborough, Ontario, Canada

Colonial naval flag of Courland

=== Combined charges ===
Flag of Tarn (department), Occitania (administrative region), France
(Chef-pal)
