= Crampton =

Crampton is an English surname, from Crompton, Lancashire, which may refer to the following persons:

- Albert M. Crampton (1900–1953), American jurist
- Barbara Crampton (born 1959), American actress
- Bruce Crampton (born 1935), Australian golfer
- Frances Crampton (1945–2025), Australian gymnastics coach and sports administrator
- Gertrude Crampton (born 1905), American author
- Henry Crampton (1875–1956), American paleontologist and evolutionary biologist
- Howard Crampton (1865–1922), American actor
- Sir John Crampton, 2nd Baronet (1805–1886), British diplomat
- John Crampton (1921–2010) English aviator
- Julian Crampton (died 2019), British biologist and academic
- Mark Crampton, English journalist and historian
- Matthew Crampton (born 1986), English cyclist
- Patricia Crampton (1925–2016), British literary translator
- Peter Crampton (politician) (1932–2011), English politician
- Peter Crampton (athlete) (born 1969), British sprinter
- Robert Crampton (born 1964), English journalist
- Thomas Russell Crampton (1816–1888), English engineer
- Thomas Crampton (politician) (died 1854), American politician from Maryland
- William Crampton, British vexillologist
  - William Crampton Library

Also:

- Barbara Mary Crampton Pym, novelist
  - Crampton Hodnet, a novel by Barbara Pym
- Duncan Stuart Crampton Bell
- Philip Crampton Smyly
- William Crampton Gore

== See also ==
The following locations:

- Crampton's Gap
  - Battle of Crampton's Gap
- Crampton Island
- Crampton, Ontario, a community in Thames Centre

Other:

- Crampton locomotive
  - 6-2-0 locomotive (American usage)
- G&T Crampton, Irish construction company
