= Southern African Vexillological Association =

Flag of the Southern African Vexillological Association

The Southern African Vexillological Association (SAVA) was formed in November 1990 to promote vexillology in Southern Africa. Members of the association are drawn mainly from flag manufacturers, collectors, military historians and generally anyone with an interest in flags. SAVA became a member of the International Federation of Vexillological Associations (FIAV) at the 14th International Congress of Vexillology held in Barcelona in 1991 and was the host of the 17th International Congress of Vexillology which was held in Cape Town in August 1997.

SAVA produces a Newsletter three times a year which deals with matters of local and international vexillological interest, new flags and matters relating to the running of the association. A more scholastic Journal is also published which deals with a particular research topic related to vexillology in southern Africa and is recognised internationally for its high standard. A series on all South African regimental colours and standards since 1652 has been published which is the most comprehensive record of such flags ever published in South Africa. SAVA has also published a series of Flag Specification Sheets focusing on the flags of Africa.

Members of SAVA include the former State Herald of South Africa, Dr Frederick Brownell, who is credited with designing the flag of South Africa and the flag of Namibia. Members of the association have been involved in the design and manufacture of many other flags, particularly municipal, military and corporate flags in Southern Africa. The association has also become an important source of vexillological information and research, including more recently on the internet. Bruce Berry, a founder member, is an editor for Flags of the World, the premier vexillological website and was elected as Secretary General of FIAV in July 2019.

== Objectives of the association ==
According to its constitution, SAVA has the following objectives:

- To record and preserve any and all information relating to flags in general and the flags of Southern Africa in particular;
- To undertake research and study programmes, organise conferences and symposia, and to exchange information on flags and related matters with similar Associations and Institutions elsewhere in the world; and
- To act as an information source for the general public and any interested bodies on all matters pertaining to flags.

SAVA is a non-profit, non-political and non-sectarian organisation that under no circumstances will become affiliated or associated with any political or religious body or sect.

== Organization flag ==
The flag of the association is registered with the South African Bureau of Heraldry (Certificate Number 2362 issued on 4 October 1991) and is described as follows: A rectangular blue flag, proportion 3:2; bearing a gold chevron inverted, the tip couped, and in the centre five four-pointed stars, also white, conjoined in cross. Both the base and the tip of each chevron are respectively equal to half of the width of the flag, while the outer point of the stars in fess touch the conjunction of the chevrons.

The symbolism of the flag is as follows: At least one of the colours in this flag can be found in the national flag of each country in Southern Africa. The gold inverted chevron (the "V") alludes to vexillology. The five white stars, which are derived from the Southern Cross, and the white chevron, in turn allude to Southern Africa. (The Southern Cross itself has not been used since it is more closely associated with the flag of Australia and the flag of New Zealand).

== Principal officers ==
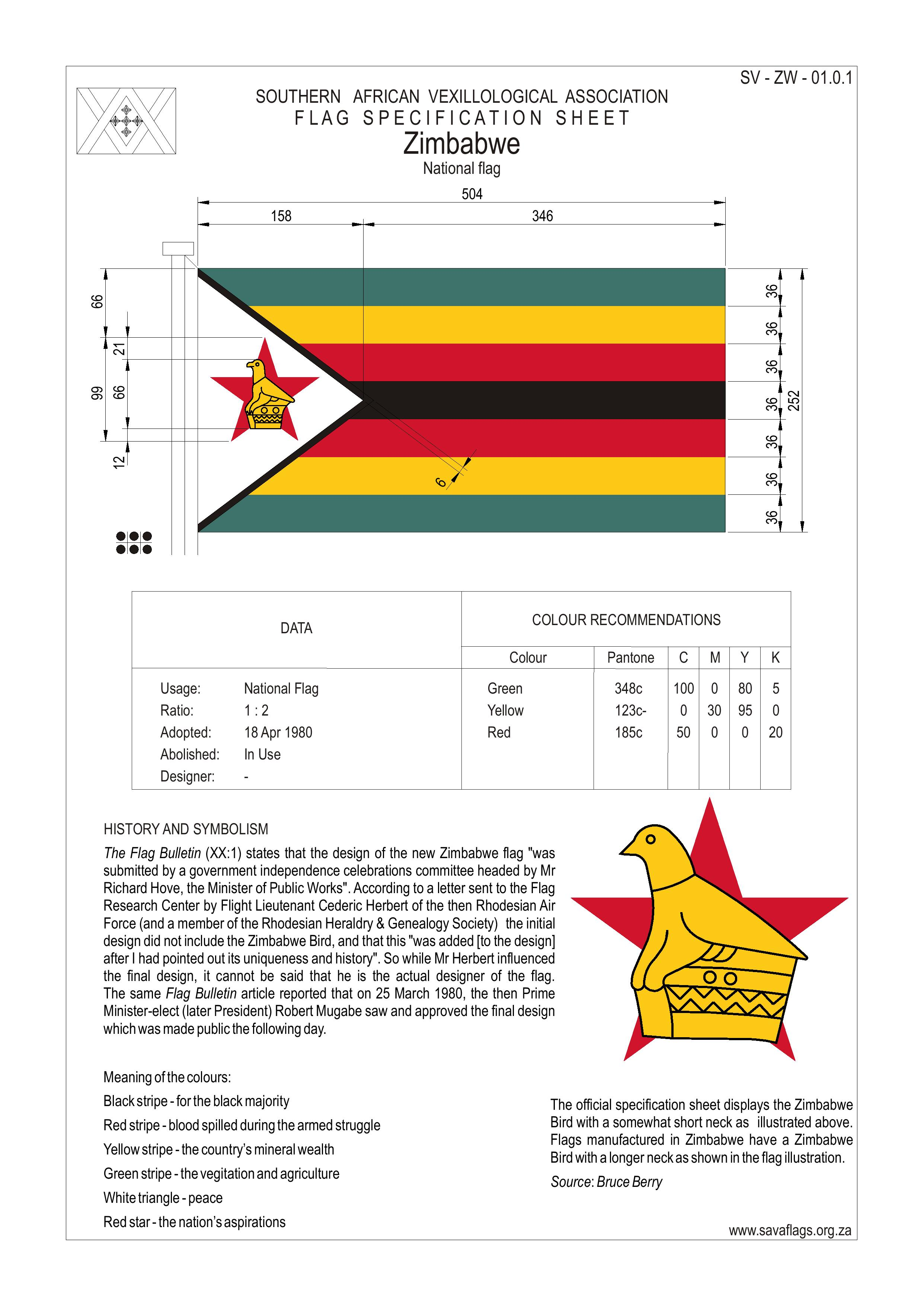
Flag Specification Sheet for the Zimbabwe flag produced by the Southern African Vexillological Association

(as at April 2019)

- Chairman – Father Peter Whitehead
- Vice Chairman – Lt. Col. Edward Watson
- Secretary/Treasurer – Bruce Berry
- Additional Member – Martin Grieve
- Additional Member – Mike Clingman
- Additional Member – Theo Stylianides

== Publications ==
SAVA has published the following in its SAVA Journal (SJ) series:

- SJ: 1/92 – Some Southern African Flags, 1940–1991 by F. G. Brownell (ISBN 0-620-16598-7)
- SJ: 2/93 – The Flags of the Union Defence Forces and of the South African Defence Force, 1912–1993 by Prof. H. H. Smith (ISBN 0-620-17683-0)
- SJ: 3/94 – The Union Jack over Southern and Central Africa, 1795–1994 by F. G. Brownell (ISBN 0-620-18833-2)
- SJ: 4/95 – The History of the Flags of South Africa before 1900 by J. A. van Zyl (ISBN 0-620-19798-6)
- SJ: 5/96 – Flags and Symbols of Rhodesia, 1890–198|0 by R. Allport (ISBN 0-620-21797-9)
- SJ: 6/97 – The Burgees of Recreational Boating in South Africa – a preliminary checklist by Peter Edwards (OCLC 41554628)
- SJ: 7/98 – South African Military Colours – 1664 to 26 April 1994 Part I – Introduction and South African Military Colours : 1664 to 30 June 1912 by Prof. H. H. Smith (ISBN 0-620-25670-2)
- SJ: 8/99 – South African Military Colours – 1664 to 26 April 1994 Part II Vol. 1 – Military Colours of the Union Defence Forces and of the South African Defence Force : 1 July 1912 to 30 May 1961 by Prof. H. H. Smith & F. G. Brownell (ISBN 0-620-30685-8)
- SJ: 9 – South African Military Colours – 1664 to 26 April 1994 Part II Vol. 2 – Military Colours of the Union Defence Forces and of the South African Defence Force : 1 July 1912 to 30 May 1961 Colours devised for the Commandos of the South African Defence Forces prior to World War II by Prof. H. H. Smith & F. G. Brownell (ISBN 0-620-34701-5)
- SJ: 10 – South African Military Colours – 1664 to 26 April 1994 Part III Vol. 1 – Military Colours of the South African Defence Force 31 May 1961 to 26 April 1994 : The National Colour and Colours devised for the South African Army by Prof. H. H. Smith & F. G. Brownell (ISBN 978-0-620-50804-9)
- SJ: 11 - South African Military Colours - 1664 to 26 April 1994 Part III Vol. 2 - Military Colours of the South African Defence Force 31 May 1961 to 26 April 1994 : Colours devised for the South African Air Force, Navy, Medical Service and the South African Police by Prof. H. H. Smith & F. G. Brownell (ISBN 978-0-6399231-0-9)

Other publications include:

- Martinez, P. (ed), 1999: Flags in South Africa and the World – Proceedings of the XVII International Congress of Vexillology, Southern African Vexillological Association (ISBN 0-620-24397-X)
- Vagnat, P and Poels, J., 2000: Constitutions – what they tell us about national flags and coats of arms (SAVA 10th Anniversary Special)
- Burgers, A. P., 2008: The South African Flag Book – A History of South African Flags from Dias to Mandela, Protea Book House (ISBN 978-1-86919-112-2)

Posters:

- Southern African Vexillological Association - Celebrating 20 years of service to the vexillological community 1990 – 2010 illustrating all the national flags which have flown over South Africa
- Flags and Ensigns of the World 2017 illustrating the national flags and ensigns in use as at 31 July 2017

In addition, the SAVA Newsletter (SN) is published three times per annum and is sent to members.
