= Peter Edwards (vexillologist) =

Canadian vexillologist (1931–2019)

Peter Edwards CD, CStJ, FRHSC
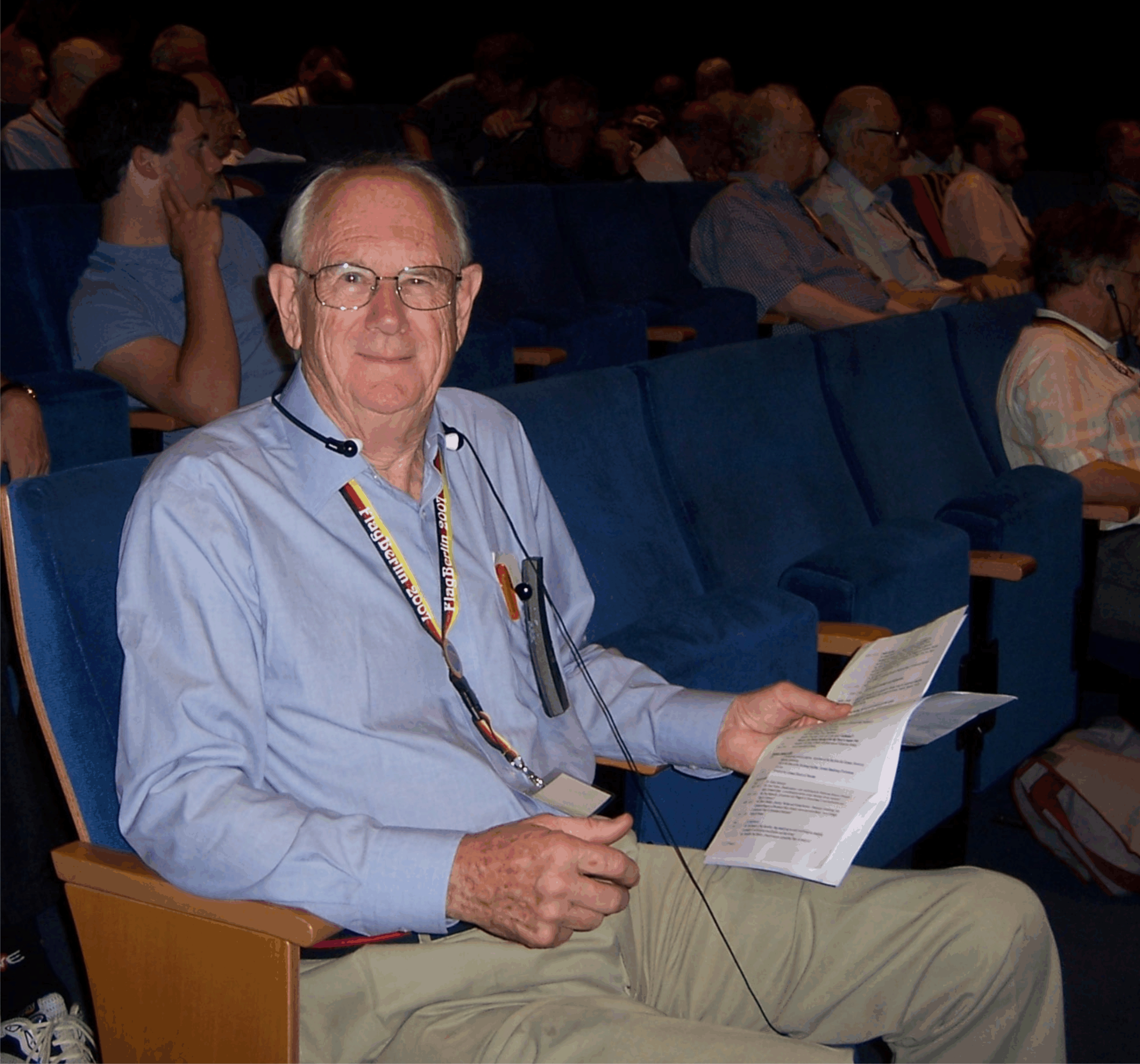
- Edwards in 2007
- Born: March 19, 1931; Great Crosby, UK
- Died: July 25, 2019 (aged 88); Toronto, Canada
- Education: York University; University of Toronto
- Organization: Burgee Data Archive

Peter Brian Edwards CD, CStJ, FRHSC (March 19, 1931 – July 25, 2019) was a vexillologist and scholar of flags. He established the Canadian Flag Institute on October 31, 1978.

== Life ==
Interested in vexillology, he was a member of the North American Vexillological Association and on October 31, 1978, he established the Canadian Flag Institute, renamed Burgee Data Archive (BDA) August 31, 1993. Peter was diligent in researching the often-neglected field of maritime flags and became the world's top reference in the study of burgees. The Burgee Data Archive published “The Private Signal”, a periodical vexillological journal, and was accepted as a member of the International Federation of Vexillological Associations in 1997.

He was the fourteenth president of the Royal Heraldry Society of Canada, from 1988 until 1990.

Peter Edwards deposited his and the BDA's collection and library at the Naval Marine Archive in Picton, Ontario before his death in 2019.
