= Flag of Sacramento =

City of Sacramento

The flag of Sacramento, California, was adopted on August 15, 1989. It consists of two different shades of blue, separated by a wavy line. On the top-right and bottom-left are two half-oblongs - one green and one yellow. On the bottom is the official name "CITY OF SACRAMENTO" in the font of "Century Gothic".

The flag is no longer to be seen at Sacramento City Hall, and the organization that helped fly it is no longer in business, so like Amarillo, Texas, the flag is long-lost and forgotten.

== Symbolism ==
The white represents the city's virtue, strength, and bright future. The two blue sections represent the city's rivers (the Sacramento River and the American River). The green stands for the agricultural heritage, and the gold color represents the gold miners so important in the history of California and of Sacramento, the center of the Gold Country and the California gold rush.

== 2004 NAVA survey ==
The flag scored 4.97 / 40th out of 150 on the 2004 NAVA survey, tied with Birmingham, and ahead of Springfield.

== Former flag (1964-1989) ==
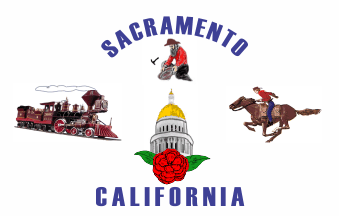

The first and former flag of Sacramento, California, is a white background with a dome of the California State Capitol accompanied by a white rose surrounded by a train, a miner, and a person on a horse. Those elements are surrounded by the city's and state's name in blue. It was adopted on January 23, 1964, designed by Max Depew and E.A. Combatablade, with the sketch of the flag made by Goodwin & Cole, and has proportions of 7:11.

The reason for the adoption is, to celebrate its 125th anniversary, and it was one of the last major cities in California without a city flag.
