= The American Flag: Two Centuries of Concord & Conflict =

Book by Howard Michael Madaus

- First edition
- Author: Howard Michael Madaus and Whitney Smith
- Language: English
- Genre: Nonfiction
- Publisher: Veninga-Zaricor Publications
- Publication date: 2006
- Publication place: United States
- Media type: Print (Deluxe Hardback)
- Pages: 148 pp (first English edition, hardcover)
- ISBN: 0-9755168-0-9 (first English edition, hardcover)

The American Flag: Two Centuries of Concord and Conflict is a nonfiction book by respected flag historians Howard M. Madaus and Whitney Smith. This book chronicles some significant flags of the Zaricor Flag Collection. The authors originally created the book as an exhibition catalog for some flag exhibitions, but the work grew into a large format hardcover book. The book was seen as one of the most significant flag book of the past three decades.

The book is 148 pages of pictures of the American flag and a short overview of American history, as told through flags. The six chapters are styled as galleries, a flag on each page, with an appropriate text plate as if it were still on exhibition. The descriptions of the flags trace their history from adoption and to the evolution of the "Stripes and Stars" from a "New Constellation" to "A Symbol of World Power". The book also discusses a few special flags that are associated with significant moments in history such as: Lincoln, Custer, Sheridan and Kennedy. There are three featured essays by academics that interpret the flags' meanings.

== Accolades ==
The book has been accorded two distinct honors:

In 2007, the book was given the Vexillon Award which is sponsored by the Flag Society of Australia Inc. and presented by Fédération internationale des associations vexillologiques, or FIAV. It was given to the authors for their contribution to vexillology since the last International Congress of Vexillology.

In 2008, the book was awarded the "Book of the Year" by the William Greenleaf Eliot Society of Washington University in St. Louis.

== Documentary ==
The American Flag: Two Centuries of Concord & Conflict is also a one-hour television documentary on PBS featuring untold stories of the history of the American flag. The documentary has archival footage and images of the historic flags, as well as reenactments and interviews with historians and flag experts about the history of the American flag. The program is focused on the untold history of the American flag. The film, is based on the companion book of the same title. The authors of the book, Howard Madaus and Whitney Smith, both respected flag historians, are interviewed in the film.
