= Andriy Grechylo =

Ukrainian historian, heraldist and vexillologist

- Андрій Богданович Ґречило
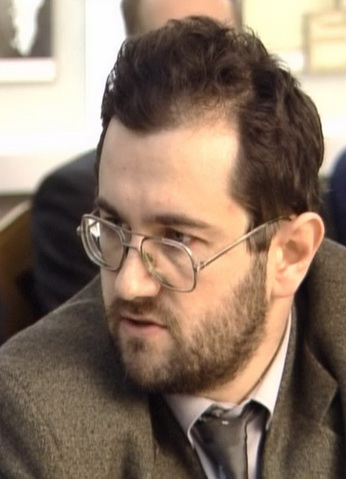
- Pronunciation: [andri bohdanovɪtʃ gretʃjlo]
- Born: November 19, 1963 (age 62); Lviv
- Education: PHD, Lviv Polytechnic
- Occupation: Historian
- Website: http://uht.org.ua/ua/members/grechylo/

Andrii Grechylo (Ukrainian: Андрій Богданович Ґречило; Andriy Bohdanovych Grechylo / Hrechylo / Greczylo) is a Ukrainian historian, heraldist and vexillologist. During his career he has published several books and designed hundreds of coats of arms, flags, banners and seals for over 1000 different municipalities and institutions.

== Biography ==
Andrii Grechylo was born on November 19, 1963, in Lviv, Ukraine. He studied architecture at the Lviv Polytechnic. Since 1990, he was a research worker (scholar) of the Hrushevskyi Institute of Ukrainian Archeography and Source Studies, National Academy of Science of Ukraine.

Grechylo received his PhD in historical science in 1996 and defended a dissertation titled "Ukrainian Municipal Heraldry: Tendencies of Evolution". In 2012, he defended a dissertation titled "Ukrainian Territorial Heraldry" and he was awarded the degree of Doctor of History (DSc).

In 1990, he has founded the Ukrainske Heraldychne Tovarystvo (Ukrainian Heraldry Society) – since 1995 a member of FIAV (Federation internationale des associations vexillologiques) and CIGH (Confédération Internationale de Généalogie et d’Héraldique).

Andrii Grechylo is an academician of the Académie Internationale d'Héraldique (International Academy of Heraldry) and a president of UHT (Ukrainian Heraldry Society).

Since 1993, he is an editor of the bulletin Znak (The Sign). He also is an editor of the yearly journal Genealogichni zapysky (Genealogical Notes). Grechylo is co-author of the Small State Coat of Arms of Ukraine. He has also designed flags and arms for provinces, districts, cities, towns, villages, universities, organisations, ecclesiastical provinces and for individuals. Although he is known mainly for his expertise in heraldry and vexillology.

In 1992—2011 and since 2015, Andrii Grechylo was a member of the Presidential Commission of the State Awards and Heraldry. In 2009, he was honoured with the Order of Merit 3rd Class.

In 2013, Andrii Grechylo was made by FIAV a Fellow of the Federation.

Since 2015 he is a Full Member of the Shevchenko Scientific Society.

== Publications ==
- Eagle and Lion in the heraldry of the Galician-Volhynian State (13th-14th centuries). In: L`aigle et le lion dans le blason medieval et moderne: Actes du IXe colloque international d`heraldique, Cracovie, 4-8 septembre 1995. P. 123–126. Warszawa, 1997.
- Ukrayinska miska heraldyka, Kyiv, Lviv, 1998 (Ukrainian Municipal Heraldry) ISBN 966-02-0406-X
- Herby mist Ukrayiny (14 – 1 pol. 20 st.), Kyiv, 2001 (Coats of Arms of Ukrainian Towns (14th-First Half of 20th Century)) ISBN 966-578-085-9 (co-author)
- Herby ta prapory mist i sil Rivnenskoyi oblasti, Kyiv, Lviv, Rivne, 2002 (Coats of Arms and Flags of Towns and Villages in Rivne Oblast) ISBN 966-02-0407-8 (co-author)
- Contemporary flags of the Ukrainian regions: Old traditions and new designs. In: Proceedings of the XX International Congress of Vexillology, Stockholm, 27 July to 1 August 2003 /ed. by J. O. Engene. P. 233–254. Bergen: Nordic Flag Society, 2004.
- Herby ta prapory mist i sil Ukrayiny, vol. 1. Lviv, 2004 (Coats of Arms and Flags of Towns and Villages in Ukraine, vol. 1) ISBN 966-02-0994-0.
- New symbols for an old Swedish village in the Ukrainian steppes. In: Nordiska Flaggenkontakt, no 46, p. 35-37. Laksevag, 2008.
- Pechatky mista Lvova XIV-ХVІІI st., Lviv, 2010 (Seals of Lviv City (14th-18th Centuries)) ISBN 978-966-02-5837-2
- Ukrayinska terytorialna heraldyka, Lviv, 2010 (Ukrainian Territorial Heraldry) ISBN 978-966-02-5259-2
- Bibliohrafichnyi pokazhchyk: Hrushevskyi M., Istoriia Ukrainy-Rusy, Lviv, 2015 (Bibliographic index: Mykhailo Hrushevsky, History of Ukraine-Rus') ISBN 978-966-02-7393-1 (compiler).
- Nash herb: Ukrayinski symvoly vid knyazhykh chasiv do syohodennya, Kyiv, 2018. (Our Coat of Arms. Ukrainian Symbols from the Princely Times to the Present) ISBN 978-617-7482-20-7 (author of text).
- Herby ta prapory mist i sil Ukrayiny, vol. 2. Lviv, 2020 (Coats of Arms and Flags of Towns and Villages in Ukraine, vol. 2) ISBN 978-966-02-3781-0.
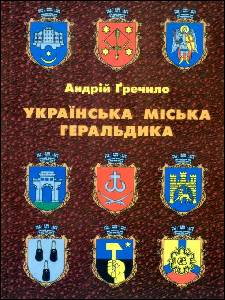
Ukrainian Municipal Heraldry

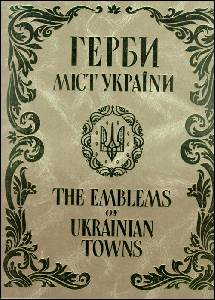
Coats of Arms of Ukrainian Towns (14th-First Half of 20th Century)

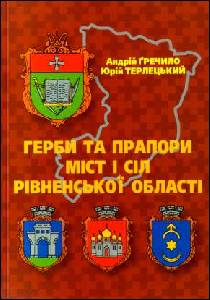
Coats of Arms and Flags of Towns and Villages in Rivne Oblast

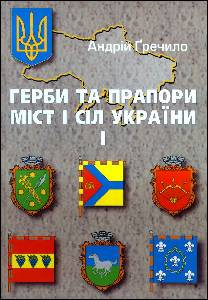
Coats of Arms and Flags of Towns and Villages in Ukraine, vol. 1

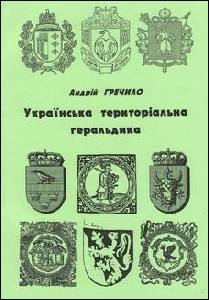
Ukrainian Territorial Heraldry

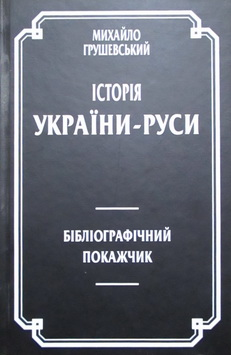
Bibliographic index: Mykhailo Hrushevsky, History of Ukraine-Rus'

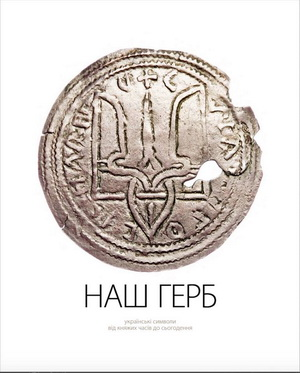
Our Coat of Arms. Ukrainian Symbols from the Princely Times to the Present

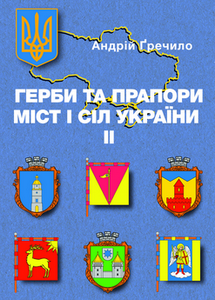
Coats of Arms and Flags of Towns and Villages in Ukraine, vol. 2

== Awards ==
- The 3rd Class of the Order of Merit (2009).
- In 2013 he was made by FIAV a Fellow of the Federation.

== Sources ==
- Publications at «Academia.edu»
