= Flag of Provo, Utah =

Provo, Utah
- Use: Civil flag
- Proportion: 3:5
- Adopted: January 6, 2015
- Design: Blue background with the Provo City logo in the center

The municipal flag of Provo, Utah, United States, features the city's logo on a light blue field. It was adopted on January 6, 2015, after a multi-year debate to replace the previous one. The former flag, adopted in 1989, was ridiculed in particular for its perceived ugliness and its similarity to the Centrum logo, and was voted one of the worst American city flags by the North American Vexillological Association (NAVA).

== Design ==
The current city flag of Provo, Utah, is described in section 1.05.010 of the municipal code as consisting of a light blue field and the city's logo at the center. The city's logo, adopted in 2012, includes representations of Utah Lake, nearby mountain peaks, and a rising sun for Provo's goals and aspirations.

== History ==
=== First flag ===
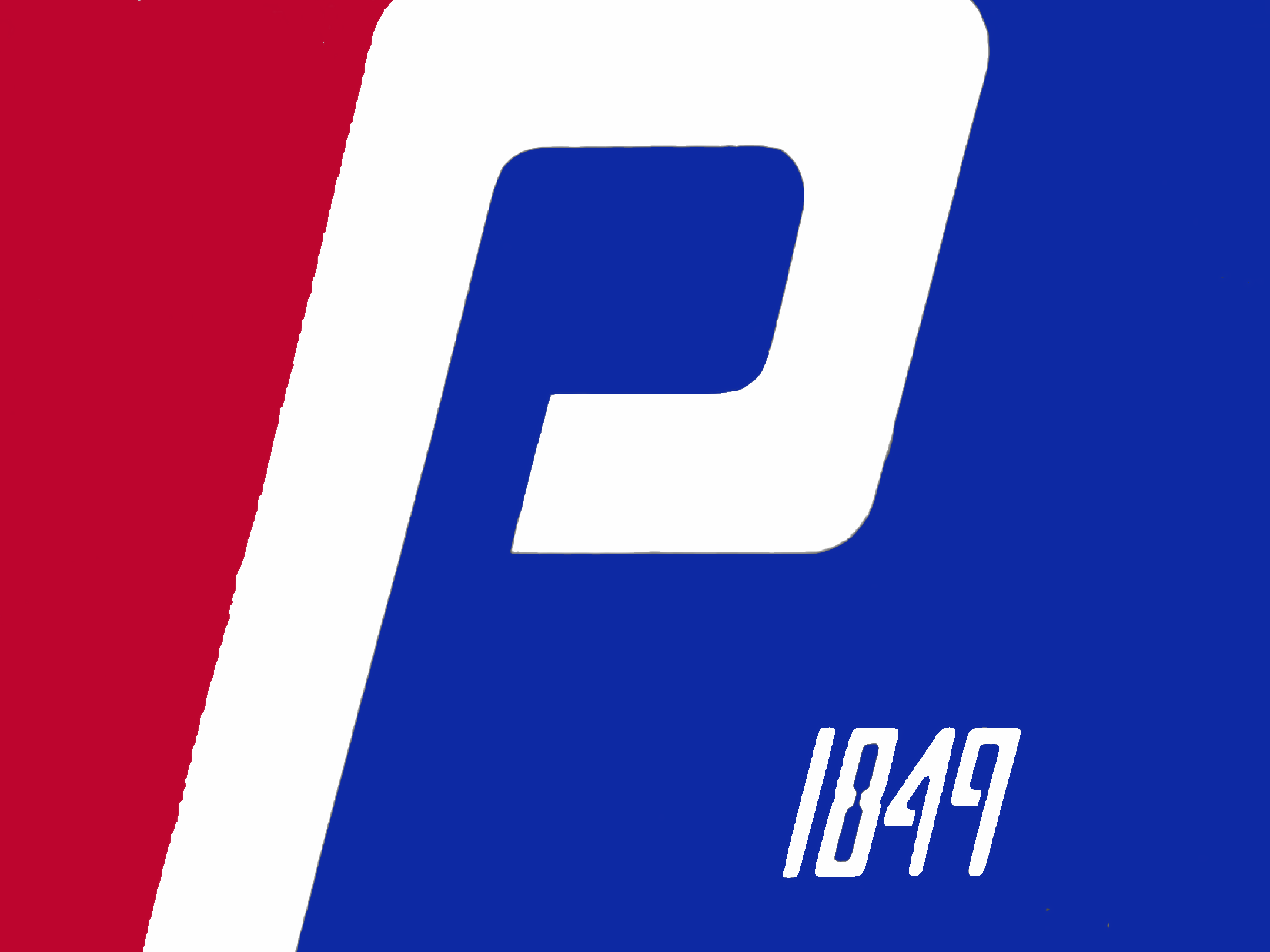
The first flag of Provo, Utah, from 1976 to 1989

The first flag of Provo was unveiled on April 7, 1976, and consisted of a red and blue field with a stylized "P" (standing for "Provo") in the center, its style reminiscent of the Penn Central logo, a class I railroad that was reorganized into Conrail 6 days prior to the unveiling of the flag. It was designed by Michael Jorgensen, a Brigham Young University industrial design student, as part of a contest run by the Utah Lake Lions Club to commemorate the city's participation in the national bicentennial.

=== Second flag ===
The second flag of Provo, Utah, from 1989 to 2015

The second flag of Provo was adopted on April 25, 1989, after it was introduced by then-mayor Joseph Jenkins based on a design by Steven Hales using the city logo. The flag consisted of a pure white field, with the word "Provo" in black lettering with gray shadows on a rainbow bar running diagonally towards the center. The rainbow represented the "eclectic and diverse nature" of Provo according to the city government.

In a 2004 survey of city flags in the United States by members of the North American Vexillological Association (NAVA), the Provo flag ranked 143rd out of 150 overall (or 8th worst), with a score of 2.14 out of 10 points. The poll was contested between 150 American cities via an online poll; the flag of Washington, D.C. ranked first, while the flag of Pocatello, Idaho, ranked last. Newspaper references to the survey said the flag was known to be "notoriously bad among flag enthusiasts".

The flag's design has been compared to the label on Centrum vitamin bottles, and to a work drawn in magic marker and crayons.

=== Third flag ===
Mayor John Curtis began a public process to replace the second flag in 2013, in response to repeated references to the NAVA survey, consulting with local vexillologists and residents for ideas. In May 2014, the flag replacement process was narrowed to two options by a three-member committee, both consisting of simple renditions of Utah Lake and nearby mountains, with one option having three stars to represent life in Provo. The designs were not well received by residents, leading Mayor Curtis to propose a public design contest to end in early June. A consensus was reached by residents to not use the color red in the new flag, as it is used by the University of Utah, a rival to Provo's Brigham Young University.

A total of 51 proposals were submitted and added to an online poll in July. Two finalist designs were presented to the Provo City Council in September, featuring a stylized mountain against a white or blue field. On January 6, 2015, the Provo City Council unanimously selected the city's new flag, a new design that incorporated the city's new logo (adopted in 2012).
