= Great Waters Association of Vexillology =

Great Waters Association
- Great Waters Association of Vexillology
- Flag of the Great Waters Association of Vexillology
- Named after: Great Lakes Ohio River
- Established: May 11, 1991
- Founder: John M. Purcell
- Founded at: Kettering, Ohio
- Defunct: April 4, 2013; 13 years ago
- Region served: Great Lakes region
- Field: Vexillology
- Director: Peter Kinderman
- Publication: Flagwaver, a Journal of Vexillology
- Affiliations: International Federation of Vexillological Associations, North American Vexillological Association (1991 - 1996)
- Website: gwav.tripod.com
- Formerly called: Great Waters Chapter

The Great Waters Association of Vexillology (GWAV, pronounced gwave) was an organization devoted to vexillology, the scientific study of flags. GWAV had a particular focus on flags of the Midwestern United States.

The group was established May 11, 1991, in Kettering, Ohio, a suburb of Dayton. Initially, the members met with the intent to establish a local chapter of the North American Vexillological Association (NAVA). When NAVA decided to not have chapters, the group set out to be independent.

Initially, the group covered the US states of Indiana, Kentucky, Michigan and Ohio. The name acknowledges the Great Lakes and Ohio River as vital components of this region. In 2000, the State of Illinois was added.

The organization's flag was designed in 1991 and was modified with the addition of Illinois. It depicts five inverted chevrons or “V”s on a blue background. The chevrons (which resemble the letter V) represent vexillology, and alternate in color from white to red indicate each of the states covered by the group.

The group met semi-annually, normally in May and November, and from 1990 through 2012, published Flagwaver, a Journal of Vexillology (ISSN 2327-2368) each June and December. The journal featured articles about flags used within the five states comprising the organization. Among those highlighted were the flags of Springfield, and Chicago in Illinois; Detroit and Grand Rapids in Michigan; Cleveland and Cincinnati, Ohio and Louisville, Kentucky.

In May 1999, the membership established the Commodore Award and the Flying Colors Award. The Commodore Award is given for significant individual contribution to the field of vexillology, especially in the GWAV states, and the Flying Colors Award is presented to a flag designer and adopting entity for excellence in flag design. Through 2012, the Commodore Award has been presented twice and the Flying Colors Award once.

In 1999, GWAV became one of the 51 members of International Federation of Vexillological Associations, known by its French acronym FIAV (Fédération internationale des associations vexillologiques).

GWAV hosted the North American Vexillological Association's 1995 annual meeting in Covington, Kentucky, the 2000 annual meeting in Lansing, Michigan, the 2004 annual meeting in Indianapolis, Indiana, and the 2012 annual meeting in Columbus, Ohio.

On June 15, 2012, one of the charter members, Dr. John M. Purcell, died at the age of 79. Following this, interest in maintaining the group waned as membership had dropped to only four members and they decided to suspend operations on April 4, 2013.
