= Flag waver =

Flag waver, Flag Waver or Flagwaver may refer to:

- Flag Waver, a composition by Jerry Gray
- Flag waver, a piece in Ko shogi, a variant of the Japanese board game shogi
- Flag Waver, winner of the 1983 Rampart Stakes American Thoroughbred horse race
- Flagwaver, a Journal of Vexillology, a semi-annual Great Waters Association of Vexillology publication
