= SEV =

Sev, SeV or SEV may refer to:

- Sev (food), an Indian snack food; tomato Sev, palak sev, plain sev
  - Sev puri (redirect from Sev Puri) Indian snack and a type of chaat from Mumbai
  - Sev mamra, Indian snack mixture of spicy dry ingredients such as puffed rice (mamra), savoury noodles (sev) and peanuts.
- Sev (band) rock band from the Northern Virginia area who appeared in a national advertising campaign for Pepsi Blue
- "Sev" (song) (Turkish "love"), the Turkish entry to the Eurovision Song Contest 1995
- Lake Sev, lake located on the border between Armenia and Azerbaijan

== People with the name ==
- Sev Lewkowicz (born 1951), musical composer, producer, arranger and keyboard player based in the UK
- Sev Statik, a hip hop musician from Albany, New York, US
- Sev Aszkenazy, American real estate developer in San Fernando, born in 1961.

== Acronyms ==
- SEV (company), a power company of the Faroe Islands
- Comecon, a former economic organization under the leadership of the Soviet Union
- Sociedad Española de Vexilología, the Spanish Society of Vexillology
- Union of Transport Workers, Swiss trade union, from the initials of its former name in German
- Sevenoaks railway station, Kent, National Rail station code SEV
- Space Empires V, 2006 4X turn based strategy game

=== Science and technology ===
- Solar electric vehicle
- Space Exploration Vehicle
- Secure Encrypted Virtualization, AMD CPU technology
- Sendai virus
- Nyarafolo language (ISO 639 code)
- Schweizerischen Elektrotechnischen Verein, also Electrosuisse SEV, is a Swiss electrical standards organization

== See also ==
- Sophie et Virginie, a 1990 cartoon series; See: Daniel Russo
