= Italian Centre of Vexillological Studies =

Flag

The Centro Italiano Studi Vessillologici (CISV, 'Italian Centre of Vexillological Studies') is a free, non-profit association of vexillology and heraldry lovers. The centre aims principally at promoting vexillological studies and preserving related documents. It was founded in 1972 in Turin and is a FIAV member since 1973.

Starting from 1974, the centre has an official, six-monthly, journal called Vexilla Italica (Latin for "Italian Flags"), reserved to its members.

== See also ==
- FIAV
