= Flag of Omaha, Nebraska =

City of Omaha

The flag of Omaha is the official flag of the city of Omaha, Nebraska. It consists of a blue background with a Native American sun symbol in gold enclosed by a circle. In its center is a red circle fimbriated in white with a depiction of a man carrying his two horses and a covered wagon.

The flag scored 5.59 and was ranked 26th out of 150 on the 2004 NAVA survey, behind Albuquerque, and ahead of Minneapolis.

== Design and symbolism ==
The blue field is for the sincerity of the people, the Native American sun identifies the heritage of the Omaha Natives, who settled in the now-city of Omaha. The sun symbol is surrounded by a circle, which represents ongoing development. The sun's rays stand for transportation on land, sea, and air; manufacturing, agriculture, and the livestock market; city government as embodied in the city charter; and culture as represented by the arts, education, and religion. The covered wagon honors the pioneer past of the city.

== History ==
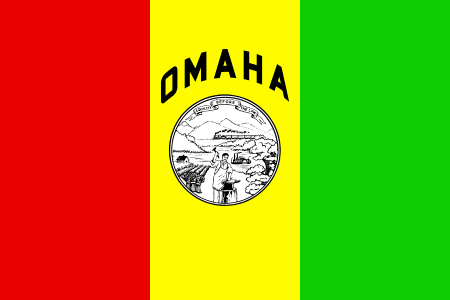
Former flag (1927–1958)

The idea for a city flag of Omaha was thought up by the city's Girl Scouts, who brought the idea up to the city's then-mayor. Two different designs were later made, and both were later combined by artist Heinz Rhode, and was later presented at the city's All-America Banquet.

The former flag of Omaha was a tricolor of red, yellow, and green, with the city's name in black, on top of a black-and-white version of the state's seal. It was adopted on September 18, 1927. The red, yellow, and green, were the Ak-Sar-Ben colors, which were "symbolic of the harvest season in the Kingdom of Quivera."

== Proposed flag ==
The proposed flag of Omaha was a tricolor of sky blue, gold, and dark blue, with a white circle being cut off by the dark blue band. The deep blue band represents the Missouri and Platte Rivers. The white circle represents the “O,” a gateway to “The Good-Life,” the Sun crossing the horizon, or a bright harvest moon. The yellow band represents the city's warmth and the sky blue band represents the sky.

The flag was designed by a man from Omaha, named Greg Daake. This later built up into a movement to make it the new flag. This flag movement made headlines on the news. Since then, the movement has died down, and the website with the flag has since been inactive.
