= Ukrainian Heraldry Society =

Heraldic organisation in Ukraine

- Українське геральдичне товариство

- Abbreviation: UHT
- Formation: 1990
- Type: Heraldic organisation
- Legal status: active
- Location: Lviv
- Region served: Ukraine
- Official language: Ukrainian
- Leader: ScD Andriy Grechylo (in 2023)
- Affiliations: International Federation of Vexillological Associations (FIAV); International Confederation of Genealogy and Heraldry (CIGH)
- Website: http://uht.org.ua

The Ukrainian Heraldry Society (Ukrainian: Українське геральдичне товариство, Ukrayinske Heraldychne Tovarystvo or UHT) is a Ukrainian non-governmental public organisation which researches Ukrainian heraldry, sphragistics (the study of wax, lead, clay, and other seals used to authenticate documents), vexillology (the study of the history, symbolism and usage of flags), genealogy, and emblems.

== History ==
The Ukrainian Heraldry Society (UHT) was founded in 1990 in Lviv. It has been a member of the International Federation of Vexillological Associations (FIAV) and the International Confederation of Genealogy and Heraldry (CIGH) since 1995.

The UHT works with historians, lawyers, archivists and museum throughout Ukraine. Heraldic experts from Ukraine and its neighbours have held conferences annually, holding seminars, producing exhibitions, and publishing materials. The UHT has published its bulletin "Znak" (The Sign) since 1993. Publications have included: "Genealogichni zapysky" ("Genealogical Memoirs") (2000), "Reyestr osobovykh herbiv UHT" ("Registering private coats-of-arms") (2003), and "Korporatyvnyi herbivnyk" ("Corporative Armorial") (2010).

The UHT cooperates actively with other Ukrainian archives and scientific institutions. It makes catalogues of municipal emblems and flags, gives an overall help to local authorities on questions regarding the archiving of materials, and assists with the reconstruction of historical symbols or the elaboration of the new ones. Members provide research into heraldry, genealogy, emblems, and sphragistics, and can be consulted about the creation of emblems and flags.

== See also ==
- Coat of arms of Ukraine
