= Philip Crampton =

Philip Crampton may refer to:

- Sir Philip Crampton, 1st Baronet (1777–1858), Irish surgeon and anatomist
- Philip Cecil Crampton (1783–1862), judge, politician and Solicitor-General for Ireland
- Phil Crampton, mountaineer

== See also ==
- Crampton (surname)
