= Alfred Znamierowski =

Polish vexillologist (1940–2019)

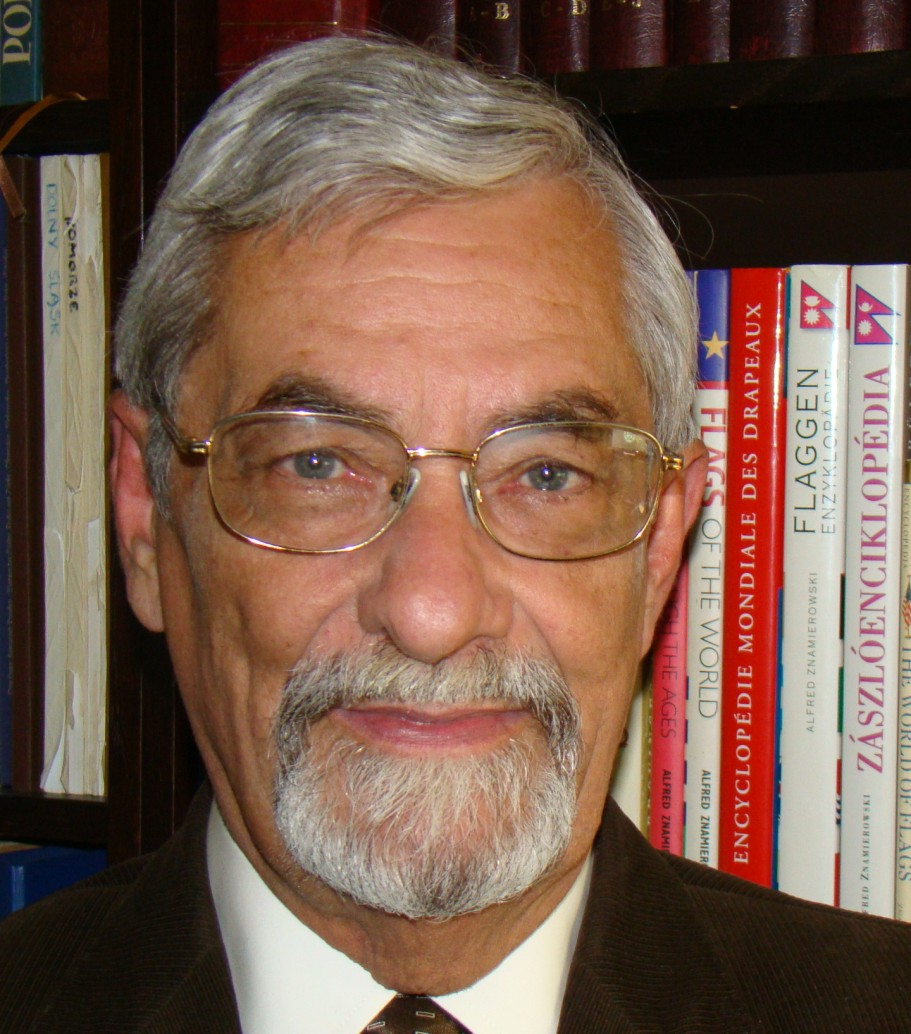
Alfred Znamierowski in 2013

Alfred Znamierowski (21 June 1940 – 23 October 2019) was a Polish vexillologist, heraldist, illustrator, and journalist. During his career he published several books and designed hundreds of coats of arms, flags, banners and seals for over 200 different municipalities and institutions.

== Biography ==
Znamierowski was born in June 1940 in Warsaw, Poland. He studied geography at the University of Warsaw. In 1965, he left Poland, and from 1966 until 1978 was an editor of the Polish Service of Radio Free Europe in Munich, Germany. In 1978, he settled in the United States and founded The Flag Design Center in San Diego, California. He worked closely with the foremost German heraldist, Ottfried Neubecker, and the American vexillologist Whitney Smith. Znamierowski produced thousands of renditions of coats of arms and flags for their books as well as for numerous encyclopedias in Germany, United States, and Poland. For many years he was the chief artist of the Flag Bulletin, published by Smith, who called him "the premier vexillological artist in the world".

Alfred Znamierowski was one of the leading figures in vexillology and the world's foremost flag artist. He began publishing numerous press articles on flags in the 1960s and thousands of his illustrations were published in encyclopedias, books and journals. He also designed flags and arms for commercial firms and for individuals. Znamierowski wrote several books on vexillology and heraldry and designed arms and flags for many Polish administrative districts, cities, and communes.

From 1985 to 1994, Znamierowski was an editor of the Polish Service of Voice of America in Washington, D.C. In 1994, he returned to his native Poland, and in 1997, he established the Instytut Heraldyczno-Weksylologiczny (Institute of Heraldry and Vexillology) - a member of the International Federation of Vexillological Associations (FIAV). In 2001, FIAV appointed Znamierowski a Fellow of the Federation, and in 2005 he was rewarded with the highest vexillological award, the Vexillon, for his promotion of vexillology.

Znamierowski was a member of the Heraldic Commission at the Ministry of Internal Affairs and Administration in Warsaw. Although he was known mainly for his expertise in heraldry and vexillology, he was also a leading member of the Polish-American Socio-Political Movement, POMOST, and of Solidarność Walcząca from 1981 to 1990. These organizations strove for the independence of Poland. In 2007, he was honoured with the Golden Cross of Merit, in 2016 with the Officer's Cross of the Order of Polonia Restituta and of the Cross of Fighting Solidarity.

He died on 23 October 2019 in Prague.

== Publications ==
- Stworzony do chwały, Editions Spotkania, Warszawa 1995
- The World Encyclopedia of Flags, Anness Publishing, London 1999
- Flags Through the Ages, a Guide to the World of Flags, Banners, Standards and Ensigns, Southwater, London 2000
- Flags of the World, an Illustrated Guide to Contemporary Flags, Southwater, London 2000
- World Flags Identifier, Lorenz Books, London 2001
- Flagi świata, Horyzont, Warszawa 2002
- Insygnia, symbole i herby polskie, Świat Książki, Warszawa 2003
- Herbarz rodowy, Świat Książki, Warszawa 2004
- The World Encyclopedia of Flags & Heraldry, Anness Publishing, London 2007
- Wielka księga heraldyki, Świat Książki, Warszawa 2008
- Pieczęcie i herby Śląska Cieszyńskiego, Górki Wielkie-Cieszyn 2011
- Orzeł Biały. Znak państwa i narodu, Bajka 2016
- Niezłomni, Editions Spotkania 2016
- Heraldyka i weksylologia, Arkady 2017
