= Theodore Sizer =

Theodore Sizer may refer to:

- Ted Sizer (1932–2009), leader of educational reform in the United States
- Theodore Sizer (art historian) (1892–1967), American professor of the history of art
