= William Crampton Library =

Library in England

Coordinates: 53°44′37″N 0°19′51″W

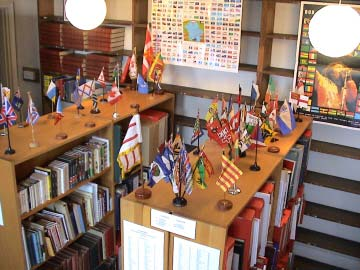
Interior of the William Crampton Library.

The William Crampton Library, so named in honour of Dr William Crampton, founder of the Flag Institute, is the United Kingdom's largest single library devoted to the subject of vexillology.

Opened by the Lord Mayor of Kingston upon Hull and William's daughter Eleanor in May 1999, The William Crampton Library of the Flag Institute was originally located in the James Reckitt Library Building in Hull. In November 2006 it moved premises to the Hull Business Centre Building. It is available for use by members of the Institute by prior appointment with the librarian.

The library collection contains books on flags and associated topics, sets of flag magazines and journals from other vexillological societies, posters, wallcharts, and actual flags numbering over 40,000 volumes.
