= Flag of Pocatello, Idaho =

City of Pocatello
- Mountains Left
- Proportion: 3:5
- Adopted: July 20, 2017; 9 years ago
- Design: A sun behind a red mountain range with three peaks arranged from largest to smallest from the hoist (intersected by a blue line near the bottom), the first of which has a snow-covered top, on a blue background

The current flag of Pocatello, Idaho was adopted on July 20, 2017, replacing the previous flag, used unofficially from 2001 to 2017. The former flag was considered by a 2004 survey of the North American Vexillological Association to be the worst of 150 selected US city flags. The current flag is commonly known as the Mountains Left, while the previous flag (used until 2017) was known as the Proud to be Pocatello.

== Design ==
=== 2017–present ===
The second version of the flag has been used since 2017. It is a rectangular flag with a medium-dark cyan-blue background. It includes three overlapping pink-red triangles, with the triangle on the left being the largest, and the other triangles getting proportionally smaller. Together, they represent the mountains of the nearby Bannock and Portneuf ranges, specifically Scout Mountain, Kinport Peak, and Chinese Peak. At the top of the biggest triangle is a yellow compass rose, formed from eight triangular arms, that are arranged with alternating longer and shorter arms. The southern point and half of each of the southwestern and southeastern points are white, with the rest of the rose being yellow. The white portion of the rose is positioned to represent the snowy peak of the largest mountain. While not officially stated in the description of the flag, the compass rose is usually interpreted by viewers as a star in the sky. At the bottom of the flag is one blue and one red stripe. The colors of the flag are described in the hexadecimal format as:

Scheme	Blue	Red	Yellow	White
HEX	#3661AD	#DB2F32	#FFCC2D	#FFFFFF

The red triangles also represent industry, recreation, and education. The compass rose symbolizes the role of the city as the transportation and trade hub for rail, road, and air, as well as the past, present, and future of the city. The yellow color represents the agricultural ties of the region and the prosperity of the city, while the white color references the snowy peaks of the mountains. The blue background symbolizes the sky, and the blue stripe near the bottom of the flag symbolizes the Portneuf River. The design of the flag was meant to represent the history of Indigenous people from the region. It conveys upward motion, signifying positive hope for the future.

=== 2001–2017 ===
City of Pocatello
- The flag of Pocatello from 2001–2017.
- Proud to be Pocatello
- Adopted: 2001 (unofficial)
- Relinquished: July 20, 2017
- Design: Two stylized purple mountains accompanied by "Proud to be Pocatello" in two different fonts, flanked by five narrow horizontal lines on each side near the top of the text and a trademark symbol on the rightmost set of lines, all on a white background, with a copyright notice at the bottom

The first flag was used by the city from 2001 to 2017. It was in the shape of a rectangle and had a white background with the city's logo. The upper part of the flag featured two blurred purple triangles that symbolized the mountains that are located near the city. The triangle on the left was twice the size of the second triangle, which was located behind the first one, and partially covered by it. Each triangle had five triangular notches on the viewer's right. The bottom part of the flag displayed writing that read "Proud to Be Pocatello", distributed into two lines. The upper line included "Proud to Be", in a yellow condensed sans-serif font with black edges and shadow. The lower line included "Pocatello" in a red serif font with white inner edges and black outer edges with black shadow. The words were put together without space left between them. On the sides of the flag, at the height of the top of the text, were displayed five horizontal thin lines. The trademark symbol (™) appears next to these lines on the viewer's right. At the bottom is a copyright notice, "Copyright © Greater Pocatello Chamber of Commerce". This flag was ranked last in the 2004 American City Flags Survey by the North American Vexillological Association.

== History ==
The first flag was created by the Pocatello Chamber of Commerce for their use as a logo. It was unofficially used by the city as its flag, from 2001 to 2017. The flag gained national attention after the North American Vexillological Association ranked it as the worst of 150 selected US city flags in its 2004 survey. Many media simplified and aggrandized this to the title of 'Worst Flag In North America'. In 2015, Roman Mars held a TED Talk, popularizing the question of flag design and the last place of Pocatello in the survey, and motivating the city to create a new flag.

In April 2016, the city's newly created flag design committee met for the first time; Roman Mars was invited and attended the meeting. The process as agreed was:

- In a first step, everybody in the world could contribute designs to the contest until December 2, 2016. The rules read: "All entries become property of the City of Pocatello and the author/creator relinquishes all rights to the design. The City reserves the right to alter, modify, or combine designs to create an official City of Pocatello flag." This resulted in an unexpected total of 709 suggested flag designs, with participants from 26 countries and 31 US states.
- In February 2017, the city website published all suggestions, ordered in groups of the creators – "professionals" and otherwise the age ranges of "18+", "13–17", "7–12", and "1–6". Those 709 suggestions were now open for public feedback.
- Considering the feedback, the flag committee now extracted and re-ordered elements of several of the 709 suggestions to create six flag designs for the finalist election where the flag with the informal name of "Mountains Left" prevailed.

On July 20, 2017, after over one year of work by the flag committee, the Pocatello City Council approved the adoption of the new flag. The city listed 98 participants "whose submission contributed or had similar features of the final design whether through style or symbolism".

== See also ==
- Flag of Milwaukee
- Flag of Provo, Utah
