= Flag of St. Louis =

City of St. Louis
- Proportion: 5:8
- Adopted: 3 February 1964
- Design: A red field with wavy blue and white lines extending from the top left, bottom left, and center right edge, with a yellow circle with a blue fleur-de-lis at the confluence of the lines
- Designed by: Theodore Sizer

The flag of St. Louis, Missouri, consists of a solid red background and three thick, wavy lines colored blue and white extending from the top left corner, bottom left corner, and center right edge. At the intersection of these lines there is a yellow disk containing a blue fleur-de-lis. (Note: In heraldic terms this might be described as "Gules, a pall fesswise wavy azure fimbriated argent, surmounted at the junction by a bezant charged with a fleur-de-lis azure".))

The flag was designed by Yale University professor Theodore Sizer and officially adopted in 1964.

In a 2004 poll on the North American Vexillological Association website, St. Louis's flag was voted the fifth-best design among United States city flags.

== Symbolism and meaning ==
Revised Code of the City of St. Louis, (Section 1.20.010)

The design submitted by Professor Emeritus Theodore Sizer, Pursuivant of Arms at Yale University, and now on file in the office of the City Register is approved, adopted and designated as the official flag of the City. The flag with a solid red background has two broad heraldic wavy bars, colored blue and white, extending from the left top and bottom corners toward left center where they join and continue as one to the center right edge. This symbolizes the confluence of the Missouri and Mississippi rivers. Over the point of confluence a round golden disk upon which is the fleur-de-lis of France (blue) calling attention to the French background of the early City and more particularly to St. Louis of France for whom the City is named. The golden disk represents the City and/or the Louisiana Purchase. (Heraldically, the disk is a "bezant" or Byzantine coin signifying, money or simply purchase.) The flag's colors recall those of Spain (red and yellow or gold), Bourbon France (white and gold), Napoleonic and Republican France (blue, white and red), and the United States of America (red, white, and blue).

== History ==
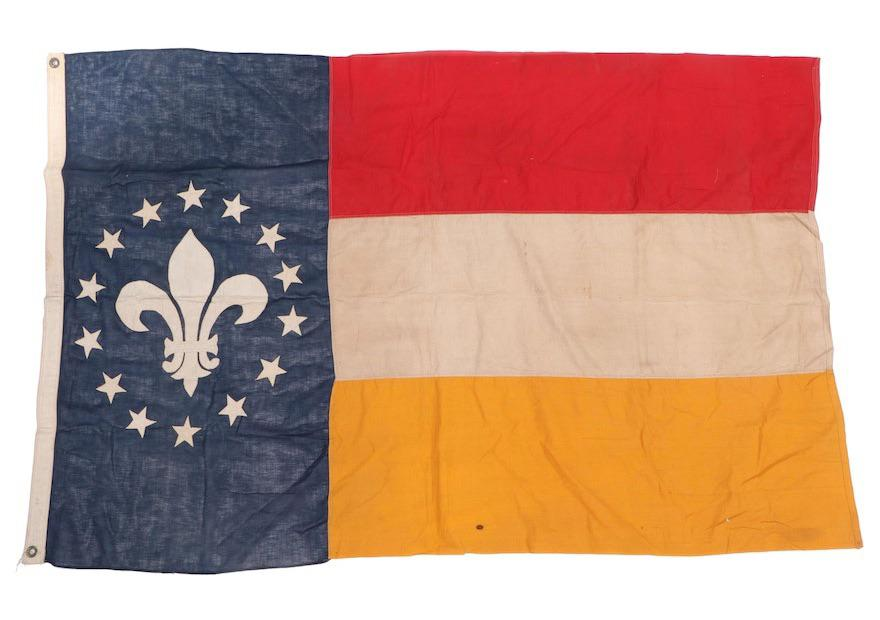
One of the flags used during St. Louis World's Fair (1904)

Winning design by Krondl in 1916

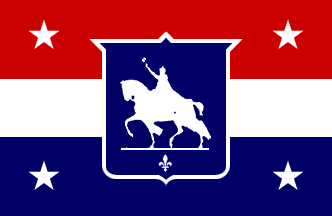
Flag of St. Louis (1946–1964)

In 1915, Percival Chubb, Leader of the St. Louis Ethical Society, proposed that the city adopt an official flag. The Pageant-Drama Association held a contest with a $100 prize. In January 1916, they awarded the winning design to Edward A. Krondl, a young commercial artist. Krondl's design featured an image of Saint Louis riding on a horse on a blue background, with orange and white stripes extending to the right. However, due to disapproval of Krondl's color scheme and his use of the fleur-de-lis, the city aldermen rejected Krondl's design and held a contest of their own. The winner of this contest, a man by the name of A.P. Woehrle, was announced in May 1916. Woerhrle's flag contained three stripes (red, white, and blue), in addition to stars on every corner and a shield containing Saint Louis in the middle. It was later discovered that Krondl had designed this flag as well, but had submitted it under the name of his friend Woehrle because he “wanted to win on merit and not the prestige gained by winning the previous contest.” The aldermen approved the design, but it wasn't until 1946 that the flag was officially recognized by a city ordinance.

Around the 1950s many citizens began advocating for the adoption of a new St. Louis flag. Charles Nagel, a St. Louis architect who was particularly critical of the old design, approached Theodore Sizer, an art history professor at Yale University, about constructing a new one. Sizer traveled to St. Louis and created the current flag layout, which has been the official flag of St. Louis since 1964.
