= Seal of Springfield, Illinois =

Seal of the City of Springfield
- Armiger: Misty Buscher, Mayor of Springfield
- Adopted: 1917
- Supporter: None
- Use: Official correspondence, insignia of city agencies and institutions

The corporate Seal of Springfield, Illinois, is the official seal adopted by the capital city of the U.S. state of Illinois. Its design consists of a black circle inscribed in white with the words "City of Springfield, Capital of Illinois," along with the year "1840." Inside the circle are line drawings of the Illinois Capitol dome and Abraham Lincoln. Over the lower portion of the seal is a banner which reads, "Home of Lincoln."

== Description ==
The city seal of Springfield is affixed to all commission or other official documents. It is required that the city seal be issued by the seal's custodian, the city clerk. The seal is also added to all official executive and legislative acts, including but not limited to: ordinances, documents, acts of the mayor and papers in the clerk's office. The seal is only considered binding on the city of Springfield if it is accompanied by the city clerk's signature wherever it is affixed.

== See also ==
- Flag of Springfield, Illinois
