= Nordic Flag Society =

Name in other languages
| Danish | Nordisk Flagselskab |
| Finnish | Pohjoismaiden Lippuseura |
| Icelandic | Norræna Fánafélagið |
| Norwegian | Nordisk Flaggselskap |
| Swedish | Nordiska Flaggsällskapet |
- Wordmark

- Flag
- Abbreviation: NFS
- Formation: January 27, 1973; 53 years ago
- Founded at: Frederiksberg Municipality, Copenhagen
- Region served: Nordic countries
- Fields: Vexillology
- Chairman: Anton Pihl
- Website: nordicflagsociety.org

The Nordic Flag Society is an association of Nordic vexillologists dedicated to the study of flags and promotion of vexillology in Scandinavia. It was founded in Copenhagen on 27 January 1973. The Nordic Flag Society is a member of the International Federation of Vexillological Associations (FIAV). In 2003 the Nordic Flag Society hosted the XX. International Congress of Vexillology with Stockholm as the venue. The Nordic Flag Society has its own flag, a Nordic cross flag with a fimbriated red cross on a yellow field. The arms of the cross meet to form a knot similar to that on the flag of the International Federation of Vexillological Associations.

Flag of the Fédération internationale des associations vexillologiques with the knot insignia shared with the flag of the Nordic Flag Society

Twice a year the Nordic Flag Society publishes the magazine Nordisk Flaggkontakt, a 60-page publication professionally printed in full colour since spring 2004 and carrying articles on Scandinavian and international vexillological topics in Scandinavian languages as well as in English.
