= William Crampton =

British Vexillologist

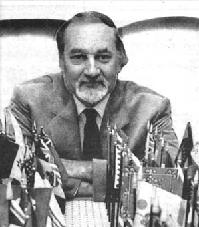
Crampton, Director of the Flag Institute and FIAV President.

William George (Bill) Crampton (5 May 1936 – 4 June 1997) was a British vexillologist. His chief legacy, the Flag Institute, has hundreds of members in the UK and overseas. He was recognised as Britain's foremost authority on flags by government agencies, the flag trade, the media, publishers, librarians and vexillologists of all ages and backgrounds. He served as a president of Fédération internationale des associations vexillologiques, the International Federation of Vexillological Associations.

== Life ==
He was educated at Wallasey Grammar School and then, after National Service in Egypt in 1954-56, at the London School of Economics where he studied sociology. He became a teacher at Gravesend Technical College, and in Ghana. In 1963, he was appointed as an adult education organiser for the West Lancashire and Cheshire Workers Educational Association.

When asked when he first became interested in flags, Crampton responded that it was like being asked when he started breathing. He was fascinated by flags from an early age, and began research as a 14-year-old schoolboy, when he realised that some flags in his atlas were obsolete. Thereafter, he devoured all the flag knowledge he could find, scouring libraries and bookstores for every available book. At university, in the army, and while working overseas, chances for flag research were limited but he nevertheless took every opportunity to gain more knowledge.

In 1963, while working in adult education, he renewed his interest in organized vexillology and contacted Whitney Smith, noted by The Economist as "the world's greatest flag expert" and father of the international vexillological movement. In 1967, Smith held a meeting in London at which Crampton met other vexillologists, including Captain E.M.C. Barraclough, then editor of the standard British reference book Flags of the World. The meeting was Crampton's launching pad. Active in the Flag Section of the Heraldry Society, he edited its newsletter from its introduction in 1969. In 1971 he formed the Flag Institute and became its director, with Barraclough as chairman. The Flag Section newsletter became the Institute's journal Flagmaster. In the same year, at the Fourth International Congress of Vexillology in Turin, the Flag Institute joined FIAV and successfully proposed that the 1973 Congress be held in London.

After the London Congress, Crampton was producing booklets and improving Flagmaster. He was invited to assist with editing The Observer's Book of Flags published by Warne. He worked with Barraclough on a new edition of Flags of the World, as well as providing information and advice on a wide variety of flag projects. The Flag Institute's services to the flag trade, its members and non-member bodies steadily increased.

At the 10th International Congress of Vexillology at Oxford in 1983, Crampton was elected as FIAV Secretary-General for Congresses. In ensuing years he achieved a near monopoly in Britain as a flag-book editor, producing many new books and new editions of established titles. His tour of duty as Congress Secretary ended in 1989. In 1991 he was awarded the "Vexillon", an award for excellence in the promotion of vexillology. In 1993 he was elected FIAV President, a post which he held until his death.

In 1995, he obtained a first-class Doctorate from the University of Manchester after 10 years of part-time study; his dissertation was titled Flags as Non-Verbal Symbols in the Management of National Identity.

Following his death in 1997, the newly opened Library of the Flag Institute in Kingston upon Hull was named in his honour as the William Crampton Library in 1999.

== See also ==
- Whitney Smith
- International Federation of Vexillological Associations (FIAV)
- Flag Institute

Preceded by Hugh Boudin; Belgium	President of FIAV; 1993–1997	Succeeded by Michel Lupant; Belgium
