= Riff Raff (British magazine) =

British rock magazine

Riff Raff was a London-based monthly rock magazine that was translated into several European languages. It was founded in 1989 by Mark Crampton, a former graphic designer, and included among its writers Mark Blake, Chris Collingwood, Joe Mackett, Nick Douglas, Peter Grant, Colin Liddell, Mark Liddell, Barbara Shaughnessy (Los Angeles Correspondent) and "The Fly," live reviews by Alli Burke and photographers Paul Smith and John Mather. The magazine, which featured interviews with top rock stars of the day, including Kurt Cobain, the Manic Street Preachers, Marillion, Megadeth, and Duff McKagan, was translated into 16 European languages, but ultimately proved unsuccessful, and folded in 1995.

Its proudest moment was perhaps in 1993, when Bono of U2 directly quoted Riff Raff columnist The Fly's catchphrase, "Bringing you the latest news, blues, and views", at the concert when Salman Rushdie came out of hiding.
