= Flag of Tulsa =

City of Tulsa
- Use: Small vexillological symbol or pictogram in black and white showing the different uses of the flag
- Proportion: 2:3
- Adopted: October 3, 2018; 8 years ago
- Design: Upper navy blue half and lower beige half, separated by a gold horizontal line, with a gold shield on the left third, containing a red circle and beige six-pointed star.
- Designed by: Jordan Michael Winn (Primary Designer); Dakota Lee Bryant (Initial Concept Sketch)

The city flag of Tulsa, Oklahoma consists of an upper navy blue half and a lower beige half, separated by a gold horizontal line, with a gold Osage shield punctuating the left third. The shield contains a red circle, and a beige six-pointed star centered within the circle. The flag is notable for being one of the few modern flags to utilize beige in its design - a color often associated with faded dyes on flags from usage.

== Symbolism ==
The navy blue field represents the Arkansas River, which flows through the city.

The gold line represents the "black gold" discovered in the region in 1901 that led to economic prosperity.

The shield is a simplified version of the shield on the Oklahoma state flag and represents Native Americans forcefully relocated to the Indian Territory.

The red circle represents the blood of the victims of the Tulsa race massacre and the star represents the future of the city.

The beige lower field represents warmth and community.

== Reception ==
In a 2022 flag survey conducted by the North American Vexillological Association, the Tulsa flag ranked 1st out of 312 new city flags in the United States, with a rating of 8.17 out of 10.

== History ==
=== 1924–1941 flag ===
1924–1941 flag

Tulsa's first flag was a non-rectangular design with the fly ending in an isosceles triangle. It consisted of a white field with a large red circle in the center with the word "Tulsa" inside. From the red circle emanate eight blue rays and six white rays. In the broader white sections are two red arrows pointing inward, with the words "Unlimited" on the hoist and "Opportunity" on the fly, both in white and in capital letters. The design suggests the brashness of early Tulsa as it grew rapidly with the petroleum industry, attracting visitors, settlers, and businesses, loudly proclaiming a bright future for all. This was adopted on June 5, 1924, during Herman Frederick Newblock's mayorship and designed by Alfred Perry. W. A. (Rose) Cease sewed the first flag.

=== 1941–1973 flag ===
1941–1973 flag

The creation of Tulsa’s second flag was initiated by a call to action from Tulsa’s Mayor, Clarence H. Veale. Veale asked art students at three local high schools as well as the University of Tulsa to submit designs for the new flag on March of 1941. “The flag should symbolize Tulsa as a clean city, an industrial city and a city of oil,” said the mayor. The flag that was chosen was designed by Erie B. Slack and was approved by city commissioners on October 10, 1941. The flag consisted of three red stripes two white stripes and a field of blue. In the center of the blue field is a circle of 45 stars, representing the 45 states which preceded Oklahoma into the union. Centering these is a design containing the forty-sixth star, Oklahoma, and symbols representing Tulsa’s predominant interests: oil, aviation, industry, and agriculture, along with a peace pipe symbolizing her Native American tradition.

=== 1973–2018 flag ===
1973–2018 flag

The next most recent flag consists of an upper one-third and two lower quadrants to form the letter "T". The flag was adopted on August 17, 1973, as part of a celebration of the city's 75th anniversary.

=== 2018 flag ===
In 2017, a group of private citizens organized an effort to design a new flag for the city of Tulsa. The effort, called the Tulsa Flag Project, received nearly 400 design submissions, of which three were chosen as finalists. Of the more than 8,000 votes cast by citizens on these finalists, 51% were for the winning design.

The winning design was released under a CC0 license (an equivalent to being in the public domain), encouraging local creators to make their interpretations of the flag. Local citizens and businesses have widely embraced the design, and it is flown throughout Tulsa. The city council officially approved the design by unanimous vote on October 3, 2018.

== Protocol ==
=== Pantone matching system ===
Description	Number	RGB	CMYK	HSV	Hex
National Flag Blue	289 C	22-43-73	96-83-44-43	215-070-029	#162B49
Mustard	130 C	235-173-33	7-33-100-0	042-086-092	#EBAD21
Bone	468 C	248-241-224	2-3-11-0	042-010-097	#F8F1E0
Bright Red	186 C	198-32-46	15-100-91-5	355-084-078	#C6202E
