= Spanish Society of Vexillology =

Spanish vexillological institution

Sociedad Española de Vexilología
- Proportion: 1:1
- Adopted: 1977
- Design: A red, yellow and red cross over white, resembling the Cross of Burgundy Flag made with the current Spanish flag

The Sociedad Española de Vexilología (SEV or Spanish Society of Vexillology) is a Spain-based non-profit institution devoted to the study of flags.

The institution has signed agreements with various institutions, such as the Provincial Council of Burgos and the Provincial Council of Guadelajara. It regularly collaborates with events organized by entities such as the Institución Fernando el Católico, the University of Zaragoza and the Institute of Military History and Culture. The institution also gives free advice to any entities interested in making a flag.

== Flag ==
The Spanish Society of Vexillology flag, designed by one of its founding members, José Luis Brugués Alonso, is a square flag that consists of a red, yellow and red cross over white, resembling the Cross of Burgundy Flag made with the Flag of Spain.

== History ==
The institution was founded on 31 October 1977 and joined the Fédération internationale des associations vexillologiques (FIAV) in 1979. In 1985, the Spanish Society of Vexillology hosted the 11th annual International Congress of Vexillology in a Madrid venue.

The Spanish Society of Vexillology distributes a publication to its members every month, 4 times a year, the magazine Banderas, and 8 times a year, the bulletin Gaceta de banderas.

Since 1986, the Society has held a national congress of vexillology in Spain every year.

== Congresses ==
CNV	Year	Locality	Autonomous community	Commemorative Flag
I	1986	Zaragoza	Aragon	
II	1987	Alicante	Valencian Community	
III	1988	Madrid	Community of Madrid	
IV	1989	Alcalá de Henares	Community of Madrid	
V	1990	Ciudad Real	Castilla-La Mancha	
VI	1991	Madrid	Community of Madrid	
VII	1992	Madrid	Community of Madrid	
VIII	1993	Madrid	Community of Madrid	
IX	1994	Granada	Andalusia	
X	1995	Oviedo	Asturias	
XI	1996	Cuenca	Castilla-La Mancha	
XII	1997	Guadalajara	Castilla-La Mancha	
XIII	1998	Burgos	Castille and León	
XIV	1999	Seville	Andalusia	
XV	2000	Zaragoza	Aragon	
XVI	2001	Soria	Castille and León	
XVII	2002	Valencia / Alcira	Valencian Community	
XVIII	2003	Miranda de Ebro	Castille and León	
XIX	2004	Santa Cruz de Tenerife	Canarias	
XX	2005	Castellón de la Plana	Valencian Community	
XXI	2006	Logroño	La Rioja	
XXII	2007	Valladolid	Castille and León	
XXIII	2008	Basauri	Basque Country	
XXIV	2009	Toledo	Castilla-La Mancha	
XXV	2010	Orense	Galicia	
XXVI	2011	Fitero	Navarre	
XXVII	2012	Plasencia	Extremadura	
XXVIII	2013	Vitoria	Basque Country	
XXIX	2014	Ponferrada	Castille and León	
XXX	2015	Huelva	Andalusia	
XXXI	2016	Segovia	Castille and León	
XXXII	2017	Jaca	Aragon	
XXXIII	2018	Ávila	Castille and León	
XXXIV	2019	Salamanca	Castille and León	
XXXV	2020	Navaleno	Castille and León	
XXXVI	2021	Marín	Galicia	
XXXVII	2022	Jaén	Andalusia	
XXXVIII	2023	Cartagena	Region of Murcia	
XXXIX	2024	Almagro	Castilla-La Mancha	

== Presidents ==
Desde	Hasta	Presidente
31 October 1977	13 October 1996	Sebastián Herreros Agüí
13 October 1996	2 November 2002	Jesús Ruíz de Burgos Moreno
2 November 2002	7 October 2023	José Carlos Alegría Díaz
7 October 2023	present	Jorge Hurtado Maqueda

== Publications ==
In addition to Banderas and Gaceta de banderas, the institution has also published several books

- Comunicaciones del XI Congreso Internacional de Vexilología. Madrid. 1985.
- Comunicaciones al IV Congreso Nacional de Vexilología.
- Hurtado Maqueda, Jorge (2004). Banderas y escudos de la Comunidad de Madrid.
- Hurtado Maqueda, Jorge (2006). Banderas y escudos de la Comunidad de La Rioja.
