= Ottfried Neubecker =

German vexillologist and heraldist

Ottfried Neubecker (22 March 1908 – 8 July 1992) was a German vexillologist and modern heraldist. He studied multiple disciplines, including religious symbolism and emblematics.

He left a collection of 10,000 books, 40,000 sheets of reference materials, and 65,000 seals. After his death, the vexillological part of his collection was acquired by the American Flag Research Center.

== Early life and education ==
He was born 22 March 1908 in Charlottenburg, Germany, into the family of a university teacher. From 1925 he studied in Heidelberg, Geneva and Berlin and from 1926 he worked for Ministry of the Interior and for the Reichskunstwart Edwin Redslob, in field of national heraldic and vexillological matters.

== Career ==
His first work was Die Reichseinheitsflagge, published with Erik Wolf in 1926. This small tract was about the dispute between the black-red-gold and black-white-red colors in Germany. The work was expanded in 1929 and published as Die deutschen Farben. In 1931 he earned doctorate with the thesis Das deutsche Wappen 1806–1871. In those years he (mainly anonymously) began the series of cigarette cards (with their corresponding albums) showing German flags, flags of the world, state coats of arms of the world, German military colors and German civic coats of arms. Each series consisted of 200–500 cards and there were 12 series.

In 1931 Neubecker had married a woman of Jewish descent and was dismissed from state services. During the Nazi regime he received commissions from the state and municipal archives, Ministry Foreign Affairs, the Air Ministry and from Kriegsmarine, but his name could not be mentioned and his great book Flaggenbuch des Oberkommandos der Kriegsmarine was published without Neubecker's name. He was paid clandestinely and unofficially for this work. From the summer of 1944 he was without a permanent residence, being continuously on the run from the Gestapo, surviving with the help of friends.

After the war he lived in East Germany and here he was consulted about municipal and state heraldry, and he lectured, wrote and published many articles. His wife settled in West Germany and in 1950 they were divorced and he remarried. In 1962 he escaped from East to West Germany, luckily with his archive.

In 1965 he participated in the First International Congress of Vexillology and was a Councillor of the Fédération internationale des associations vexillologiques (FIAV) from 1969 to 1973, he was President of FIAV from 1973 to 1981 and Secretary General of FIAV from 1981 to 1983. He was posthumously named a Laureate of FIAV in 1999 at the 18th International Congress of Vexillology in Victoria, British Columbia. He was member of the board of the Académie Internationale d'Héraldique (International Academy of Heraldry), Founder, President and Honorary President of the Wappen-HEROLD of the Deutsche Heraldische Gesellschaft e.V. (German Heraldic Society), and an honorary and corresponding member of many national and international heraldry associations.

He died in Wiesbaden 8 July 1992.

== Publications ==
- Die Reichseinheitsflagge, 1926 (The Reich Unity Flag)
- Die deutschen Farben, 1929 (The German Colours)
- Das Deutsche Wappen 1806–1871, Berlin 1931 (The German Coat of Arms 1806–1871)
- Deutsch und Französisch für Heraldiker, Berlin 1934, (German and French for Heraldists)
- Fahnen und Flaggen, Leipzig 1939, (Standards and Flags)
- Flaggenbuch des Oberkommandos der Kriegsmarine, 1939 (Flag Book of the High Command of the Kriegsmarine)
- Kleine Wappenfibel, Konstanz 1969, (A Coat of Arms Primer)
- Heraldik / Wappen – ihr Ursprung, Sinn und Wert, Frankfurt/M. 1977 (translated into five languages); Wappenkunde, München 1980, (Heraldry and Coats of Arms – Their Origin, Meaning and Value)
- Wappenbilderlexikon, München 1985, (Coats of Arms Picture Lexicon)
- A Guide to Heraldry, Adligenswil 2006

The complete bibliography covering his publications, radio and television programs comprises 42 pages.
