= Whitney Smith =

American vexillologist (1940–2016)

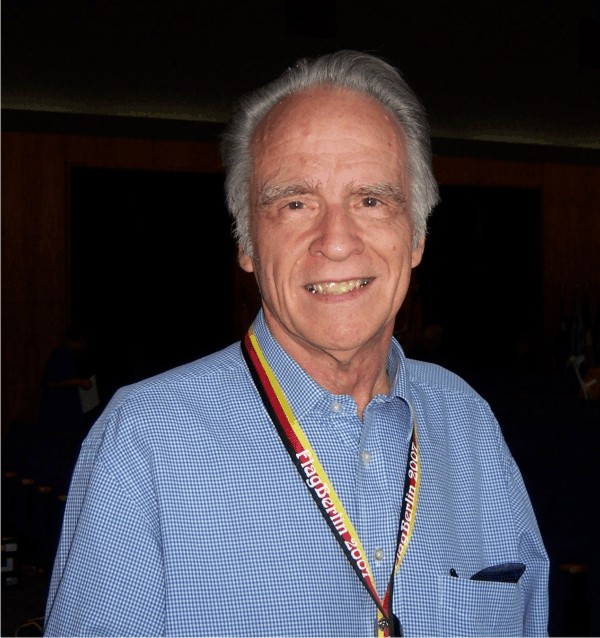
- Smith in 2007
- Born: February 26, 1940; Arlington, Massachusetts, U.S.
- Died: November 17, 2016 (aged 76); Peabody, Massachusetts, U.S.
- Education: Harvard University (BA); Boston University (PhD)
- Occupation: Vexillologist
- Years active: 1961–2013
- Organization: The Flag Research Center
- Known for: Coining vexillology; Founding the Flag Heritage Foundation, North American Vexillological Association, International Federation of Vexillological Associations; Designing the flag of Guyana
- Notable work: The Flag Bulletin; The Flag Book of the United States; Flags Through the Ages and Across the World
- Children: 2 sons

Whitney Smith Jr. (February 26, 1940 – November 17, 2016) was an American vexillologist. He coined the term vexillology, which refers to the scholarly analysis of all aspects of flags. He was a founder of several vexillology organizations. Smith was a Laureate and a Fellow of the International Federation of Vexillological Associations.

== Early life and education ==
Whitney Smith Jr. was born on February 26, 1940, to Mildred and Whitney Smith. As a youth, he lived in Lexington and Winchester, Massachusetts. Smith credited his interest in flags to his memories of Massachusetts Patriots' Day celebrations and a gift of The Golden Encyclopedia when he was about 6 years old.

At Harvard, he studied political science and received a bachelor's degree in the field in 1961. During his time at Harvard, Smith designed the flag of Guyana after corresponding with Guyanese premier Cheddi Jagan via mail. He received his doctorate in political science at Boston University in 1968 with a dissertation on political symbolism.

== Career ==
Smith designed the proposal for the flag of Guyana which, after modification and addition of black and white, was adopted in 1966. It is also known as The Golden Arrowhead.

Smith also designed this flag as a proposed flag of Antarctica. Antarctica has no government or sovereign ruler and the flag has not been adopted in an official capacity by any organization.

Smith had his first article published at age 18. By 1960, he was consulting with the Encyclopædia Britannica.

In 1961, Smith and colleague Gerhard Grahl co-founded The Flag Bulletin (ISSN 0015-3370), the world's first journal about flags. The following year, Smith established The Flag Research Center at his home and was its director.

Smith worked with Klaes Sierksma to organize the First International Congress of Vexillology (Muiderberg, Netherlands) in 1965. They joined Louis Mühlemann in founding the International League of Vexillologists and were members of its Governing Board on September 5, 1965, and operated until September 3, 1967. The league was replaced by the International Federation of Vexillological Associations (known by its French acronym FIAV) with Smith as vice-president of the Provisional Council as of September 3, 1967. In 1969, Smith moved from being FIAV Provisional Council vice-president to being the first Secretary-General of FIAV. Smith was also responsible for founding the North American Vexillological Association (NAVA) and the Flag Heritage Foundation. On August 28, 1981, he was elected the second Secretary-General for Congresses, ending his multiple terms as FIAV Secretary-General. Smith served in that office until he returned to the FIAV Secretary-General position on September 29, 1983.

Smith quit his full-time professorship at Boston University in 1970 and by 1985 had written 19 books. On July 5, 1991, Smith was named by FIAV a Laureate of the Federation and left the office of FIAV Secretary-General. He was given the honor of Fellow of the Federation on July 27, 2001. In 2006 he was the joint author of The American Flag: Two Centuries of Concord & Conflict. In 2013 he transferred The Flag Research Center's library and archives to The Dolph Briscoe Center for American History in Austin, Texas.

On November 17, 2016, Smith died from complications of Alzheimer's disease at the age of 76.

== Bibliography ==
Smith wrote 27 books on the subject of flags, notably Flags Through the Ages and Across the World, The Flag Book of the United States, and Flag Lore of all Nations.

He was the designer of the national flag of Guyana, 21 Saudi Arabian navy flags and served as a vexillographer (flag designer) to a number of governments and organizations. In 1981, Smith was part of a committee that developed the flag of Bonaire and assisted in the design of the flag of Aruba.

Smith also wrote over 250 articles for the Encyclopædia Britannica.

- Smith, Whitney (1975). Flags: Through The Ages And Around The World. McGraw Hill. ISBN 978-0-0705-9093-9.

== See also ==
- Graham Bartram
- William Crampton
- Alfred Znamierowski
- Vexillological symbol
