= William Crampton Gore =

Irish painter

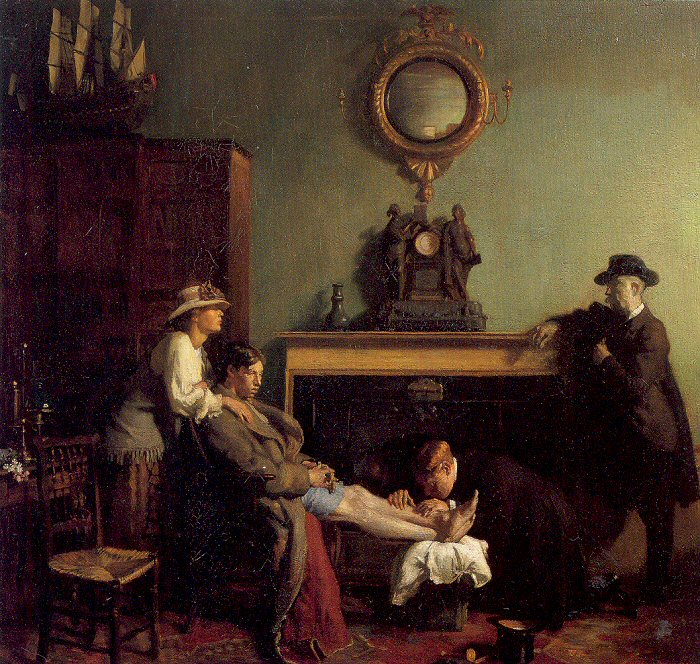
- William Orpen's A Mere Fracture, with Gore posing as the doctor
- Born: 24 October 1871; Innismore Hall, Enniskillen, County Fermanagh
- Died: 10 January 1946 (aged 74); Essex County Hospital, England
- Known for: Painting

William Crampton Gore RHA (24 October 1871-10 January 1946) was an Irish painter of interiors and still-lives.

== Life ==
Interior with the Artist's Wife, Yvonne at Montreuil-sur-Mer

William Crampton Gore was born on 24 October 1871. His father, Captain William Gore, 13th Hussars, of Innismore Hall, Enniskillen, County Fermanagh. Gore studied medicine at Trinity College Dublin, graduating in 1897 and practised until 1901.

For a few months in 1898, Gore studied art at the Slade School of Art, under Henry Tonks. He then worked as a ship's surgeon for a time, on sailings to India, Italy and North America, sketching while travelling. On his return to London, he enrolled again at Slade, studying there between 1900 and 1904. During this time, he became friends with William Orpen and Augustus John, and shared a studio with John until John's alcoholism and inability to pay the rent led to a violent outburst. Gore posed as a doctor for Orpen's A Mere Fracture. Whilst travelling, he also befriended the Norwegian painter, Fritz Thaulow, and travelled with him to Paris.

In 1904 he exhibited The Happy Valley with the Water Colour Society of Ireland. His first exhibited work with the Royal Hibernian Academy was in 1905, and he continued to show there until 1939, showing over a hundred paintings. He was elected an associate in 1916, and a full member in 1918. Later in life, he exhibited with the Goupil Gallery, the Fine Art Society, and the New English Art Club. He only had two works displayed at the Royal Academt.

Gore served in WWI as a captain in the Royal Army Medical Corps. He lived in Paris from the 1910s, marrying in France in 1923. His wife was Yvonne, and they had a daughter, Elizabeth. After his marriage, he travelled in China and Japan before settling in Montreuil-sur-Mer. His friend and fellow painter, Dermod O'Brien, stayed with Gore and his wife and daughter on numerous occasions. O'Brien married a relative of Gore, and Gore wrote a tribute to O'Brien upon his death in 1945.

Le Salon Rose (1912) oil on canvas

Examples of his works were included in the 1930 Irish Exhibition in Brussels. Most of Gore's works are interiors and still-lives, as well as flower paintings. He is credited with encouraging the Royal Horticultural Society of Ireland to host its first exhibition of Flower and Garden Paintings at the Metropolitan School of Art. Gore was also a musician and composer, putting to music verses written by his ancestor, Captain Josiah Crampton. Theo Snoddy notes that Gore "had too many interests to worry very much about pushing himself as an artist."

In 1932, Gore and his family moved to Colchester, Essex. There, he served at the Military Hospital until 1940. He resigned due to an injury sustained from a road accident which resulted in the use of crutches until his death. Gore died on 10 January 1946 at Essex County Hospital. A memorial show was organised at the RHA exhibition, and a retrospective of his work was exhibited at the Victor Waddington Galleries, Dublin also in 1946.

His works are held in the Limerick City Gallery of Art and the Hugh Lane Gallery in Dublin.
