= Fellow of the Federation =

Fellow of the Federation is the fellowship given out by the International Federation of Vexillological Associations (FIAV).

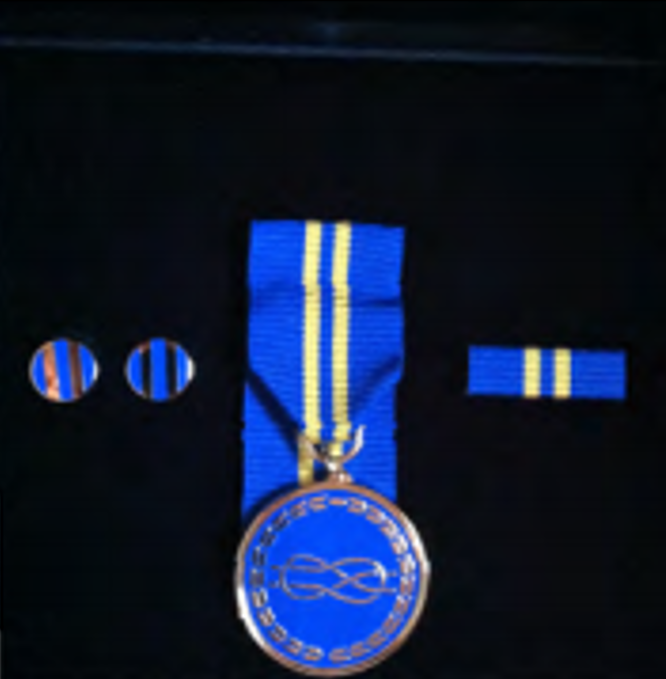
FIAV Fellowship Medal, Ribbon and Pinbadges. (Medal is Court Mounted.)

== History ==
Established in 2001, the International Federation of Vexillological Associations Board awards this fellow to those who have 'made significant contributions to vexillology and/or for rendering significant service to FIAV (including service as an ICV Congress Organizing Representative (COR)) or a FIAV Member.'

== Medal and Post Nominals ==
Recipients of this Fellowship are allowed to use the Post Nominal 'FF'.

According to the International Federation of Vexillogical Associations, when the award is given out 'A Fellow receives a certificate signed by the Board and a medal bearing the central knot device of the FIAV flag suspended from a chest ribbon of blue and yellow, the colors of the FIAV flag, as well as a miniature ribbon and a lapel pin.

== See also ==
- Vexillology
- International Federation of Vexillological Associations
