= Flags of the World (website) =

Internet-based vexillological association and resource

- Flags of the World's official flag
- Abbreviation: FOTW
- Formation: 1993; 33 years ago
- Founder: Giuseppe Bottasini
- Purpose: Vexillological
- Official language: English
- Affiliations: International Federation of Vexillological Associations
- Website: www.fotw.info/flags/index.html

Flags of the World (abbreviated FOTW or FotW) is an Internet-based vexillological association and resource, dealing with both modern and historic flags. Beginning as an email list in 1993, the website was established in 1995 by Giuseppe Bottasini, a computer engineer from Milan. It became a member of the International Federation of Vexillological Associations (FIAV) in 2001. Readers submit contributions via a mailing list. It has been called the most all-encompassing flag database on the web, with over 19,000 pages by mid 2003.

Flags of the World renders most of its images of flags in the GIF format, with a standardized and limited colour palette. A standard height of 216 pixels is used, a number chosen to make division into many different numbers of stripes possible, although other close pixels heights can sometimes be used.

The site has come under criticism for both the quality of its images and a perceived lack of reliability.

Flags of the World also maintains the "Dictionary of Vexillology" a glossary of English language flag terms. This was started in 2005 by Andreis Petrus Burgers, Terence Martin and Christopher Southworth. It has been criticized for including words of its own formulation, such as the term "archivexillum" which was coined by the editors of Flags of the World themselves in 2010.

The organization's flag was designed by Mark Sensen, with its symbolism described as follows: "White on the hoist stands for peace, blue on the fly for progress. The six colours of the stars are the main colours used in flags. The stars help to make one bigger symbol. The way the stars are all connected to each other represents the Internet."

== See also ==
- Flag Institute
