= Flag of Springfield, Illinois =

City of Springfield
- Use: Civil flag
- Proportion: 2:3 (hand-held); 1:2 (flagpole)
- Adopted: October 22, 1917; 109 years ago
- Design: A solid Old Glory Blue background with a large white-bordered Old Glory Red star in the center of a circle with 20 white stars to the left side of the flag with yellow text.
- Designed by: S.T. Wallace
- Use: Civil flag
- Proportion: 2:3 (hand-held); 1:2 (flagpole)
- Adopted: October 22, 1917; 109 years ago
- Design: A solid Old Glory Blue background with a large white-bordered Old Glory Red star in the center of a circle with 20 white stars to the left side of the flag.

The flag of Springfield, Illinois, was adopted in 1917. Its background is "Old Glory blue". The flag is emblazoned with a circle of 20 small, white stars, all pointed upward; the circle is offset, slightly, to the left of the flag. Those stars encircle a large, white-bordered "Old Glory red" star, also pointed upward. The center star is described as two stars, one atop the other, in the Springfield, Illinois, Code of Ordinances. In the past, the flag has the words "Springfield Illinois," across its bottom; now photographs show no lettering on the flag, and governmental buildings have been seen sporting a version absent text.

== Dimensions ==
In the case of hand-held or carried flags the proportions are 2:3, two units in height to every three in breadth. When the Springfield flag is flown on a flagpole, its aspect ratio should be 1:2, unless the U.S. government prescribes differing dimensions for the United States flag, in which case the Springfield flag would defer to those dimensions. When the flag is displayed from windows or over the city streets it is allowed to be notched or pointed.

== Display ==
The Springfield city clerk is considered the "custodian of the flag." The flag is displayed at city hall and at other municipal buildings and in public places. It is also displayed on specific national holidays or occasions when the flag is generally displayed. It is stipulated that the municipal flag should never take precedence over the United States flag.

== History ==
The flag was designed in a contest conceived by Springfield resident and famed poet Vachel Lindsay. The contest was sponsored by the Springfield Art Association and its winner was S.T. Wallace. The Springfield city council adopted the flag design on October 22, 1917, and it was first displayed on November 8, 1917. Indeed, the Springfield Code of Ordinances makes no stipulation for the lettering which appears on the current flag.

Instead, it describes a "pennant," similar in description to the flag. The pennant is described as containing the same elements and proportions as the flag, with the addition of the words. In the code the flag and pennant are described as two separate entities.

As of 2020, however, buildings such as the Municipality building and city library have been spotted sporting a flag with the text absent.

== Unlawful uses ==
The city of Springfield's municipal code lays out three uses of the city flag which are considered unlawful. It is unlawful to use the Springfield municipal flag for any purpose other than "customary purposes of decoration or display." It is also against local ordinance to mar the flag with any letter, word, legend or device not provided for by the municipal code. In addition, it is against the law to use the flag for advertising purposes "by printing, stamping, or displaying thereon any letter, word, legend, or device not duly authorized."

== See also ==
- Seal of Springfield, Illinois
