= Theodore Sizer (art historian) =

American art historian (1892–1967)

- Born: March 19, 1892; New York City, US
- Died: June 21, 1967 (aged 75); West Haven, Connecticut, US
- Occupations: Art historian; author
- Spouse: Caroline Wheelwright Foster
- Children: Ted Sizer

Theodore Sizer (March 19, 1892 – June 21, 1967) was an American professor of the history of art at Yale University and a director of the Yale University Art Gallery in New Haven, Connecticut. He was named the first Pursuivant of Arms for Yale University in 1963.

== Biography ==
His parents, Robert Ryland Sizer, a lumber industry executive, and Mary T. Thomsen, were married in 1890. Theodore, their first child, was born in New York City on March 19, 1892. During his early life, he was given the nickname "Tubby". He was graduated cum laude with a B.S. degree in Fine Arts from Harvard University in 1915. On October 14, 1916, he married Caroline Wheelwright Foster.

In World War I, he enlisted as a private and was assigned to the 27th Infantry Division. He was promoted to corporal, then sergeant. After officer training, he was commissioned a first lieutenant and served in Philadelphia loading transports. After his discharge from the Army in January 1919, he made several trips to South America for his employer. In 1922, he was named curator of prints and of Asian art at the Cleveland Museum of Art, where he worked until 1927.

Sizer joined Yale in 1927 as an associate professor of art history and an associate director of the Yale University Art Gallery. He became a professor in 1931 and held that position until 1957, when he retired as professor emeritus. He served as director of the gallery from 1940 to 1947.

In World War II, he served in the Monuments, Fine Arts, and Archives program as a lieutenant colonel. He was the first chief of the program operations for Germany in March 1944. He had to stop this effort due to illness and received a medical discharge in May 1944. For his work, he was awarded the Order of the Crown of Italy with rank of Commander from the Italian government in 1945. He received a Guggenheim Fellowship in 1947 for Fine Arts Research. He was elected a member of the American Antiquarian Society in 1948.

Flag of St. Louis, Missouri

Sizer became an expert in heraldry and was commissioned in 1953 by the secretary of Yale, Carl A. Lohmann, to design banners for ten Yale colleges and schools for commencement. He received the Yale Medal in 1962 for service to the university. In 1963, he was named Yale's first Pursuivant of Arms.

He designed a new flag for the city of St. Louis, Missouri that was officially adopted on February 3, 1964.

Sizer published over 160 items, especially about the life and works of the American artist John Trumbull.

== Works ==
- Sizer, Theodore (1950). The Works of Colonel John Trumbull, Artist of the American Revolution. Yale University Press.
- Sizer, Theodore, ed. (1953). The Autobiography of Colonel John Trumbull, Patriot–Artist, 1756–1843. Yale University Press.
- Sizer, Theodore (1967). The Works of Colonel John Trumbull, Artist of the American Revolution. with the assistance of Caroline Rollins (Revised ed.). Yale University Press. ISBN 9780608112749.

== See also ==
- Theodore R. Sizer – his son, known for education reform
