= International Federation of Vexillological Associations =

International vexillological institution

- The flag of the FIAV
- Formation: 7 September 1969; 57 years ago
- Type: International association
- Headquarters: Zagreb, Croatia; Johannesburg, South Africa
- Members: 53 associations and institutions
- Official languages: English, French, German, Spanish
- President: Željko Heimer
- Website: fiav.org

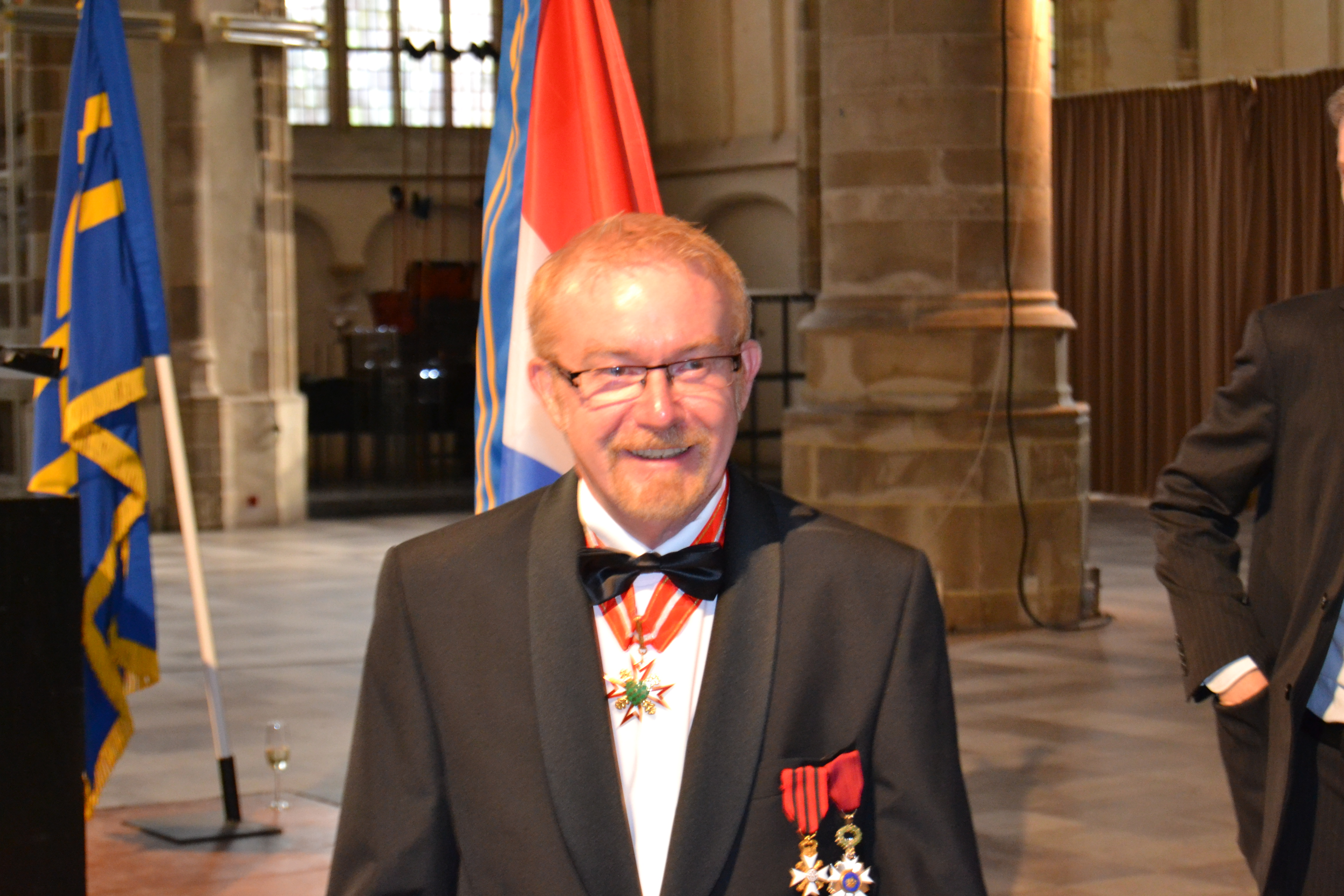
Michel R. Lupant, former president of FIAV (1997-2019).

The International Federation of Vexillological Associations (French: Fédération internationale des associations vexillologiques; FIAV) is an international federation of 53 regional, national, and multinational associations and institutions across the globe that study vexillology, which FIAV defines in its constitution as "the creation and development of a body of knowledge about flags of all types, their forms and functions, and of scientific theories and principles based on that knowledge."

== History ==
The study of flags, or vexillology, was formalised by Whitney Smith in 1957. He then moved to organize various flag organisations and meetings including the first International Congress of Vexillology in 1965 and International Federation of Vexillological Associations.

The FIAV was provisionally organized on 3 September 1967, at the Second International Congress of Vexillology held in Rüschlikon, Switzerland, and officially created on 7 September 1969, at the Third International Congress of Vexillology held in Boston, Massachusetts, US. The vexillological symbols were created by vexillologist Whitney Smith and then adopted by the FIAV in the early 1970s.

== Governance ==
FIAV has a three-person Board consisting of a President, Secretary-General, and Secretary-General for Congresses. The Board manages the current affairs of FIAV and convenes the biennial sessions of the General Assembly, which are held during each International Congress of Vexillology. The FIAV General Assembly is composed of a delegate from each of FIAV's members. The General Assembly elects the Board and is responsible for setting policy.

=== Officers ===
The current members of the FIAV Board are:

- Željko Heimer (President)(Croatia)
- Bruce B. Berry (Secretary–General)(South Africa)
- Anne M. Platoff (Secretary-General for Congresses)(United States)

=== Past officers ===
Office of FIAV President was previously held by:

- Louis Mühlemann, 1969 to 1973 ( Switzerland)
- Ottfried Neubecker, 1973 to 1981 ( Germany)
- Hugh Boudin, 1981 to 1993 ( Belgium)
- William G. Crampton, 1993 to 1997 ( UK)
- Michel R. Lupant, 1997 to 2019 ( Belgium)
- Graham Bartram (Secretary–General for Congresses)( UK)

Louis Mühlemann was also the honorary president from 1973 to 1988. (Note: Mühlemann died on 28 December 1988)

== Members ==
The current members of FIAV are:

Abrv.	Name	Country (& Territory)	Date of Admission
AAV	Argentina Vexillology Association	Argentina	August 23, 1993
ACV	Catalonian Vexillological Association	Spain (Catalonia)	May 28, 1985
BDA	Burgee Data Archives	Canada	August 14, 1997
BHVS	Bulgarian Heraldry and Vexillology Society	Bulgaria	August 6, 2013
BS	Bandiere Storiche ONLUS	Italy	August 6, 2013
CBFA	Chesapeake Bay Flag Association	United States (Delaware, Washington DC, Maryland, New Jersey, Pennsylvania, Virginia, West Virginia)	July 3, 1995
CEBED	Belgo-European Studies Center for Flags	Belgium	August 23, 1993
CFA	The Canadian Flag Association	Canada	August 23, 1993
CIDEC	Foundation Interdisciplinary Center for Cultural Studies	Argentina	August 23, 1993
CISV	Italian Centre of Vexillological Studies	Italy	September 14, 1973
CONAVEX	Corporación Nacional de Vexilología de Chile	Chile	July 16, 2019
CVS	Czech Vexillological Society	Czech Republic	August 23, 1993
DGF	German Vexillological Association	Germany	August 12, 1997
FHF	Flag Heritage Foundation	United States	July 28, 2003
FI	The Flag Institute	United Kingdom	June 24, 1971
FOTW	Flags of the World	Worldwide (Based in Canada)	July 23, 2001
FRC	The Flag Research Center	United States	September 7, 1969
FSA	Flag Society of Australia	Australia	May 28, 1985
Fundesvex	Fundación de Estudios Vexilológicos	Spain	July 7, 2026
GHVI	Institute of Genealogy, Heraldry and Vexillology	Lithuania	July 12, 2022
GSI	Genealogical Society of Ireland	Ireland	May 28, 1985
GWAV	Great Waters Association of Vexillology (Note: Defunct since April 4, 2013)	United States (Illinois, Indiana, Kentucky, Michigan, Ohio)	July 29, 1999
HGZD	Croatian Heraldic and Vexillological Association	Croatia	August 7, 2007
HS	Heraldica Slovenica	Slovenia	August 23, 1993
HVK	Heraldic Society "The Clover Leaf"	Germany	August 23, 1993
IHW	Institute of Heraldry and Vexillology	Poland	July 23, 2001
IVA	Indian Vexillological Association	India	August 7, 2007
JAVA	Japanese Vexillological Association	Japan	July 23, 2001
KVV	Breton Vexillology Society	France (Brittany)	August 12, 1997
NAVA	North American Vexillological Association	North America (United States & Canada)	September 7, 1969
NEVA	New England Vexillological Association	United States (Connecticut, Maine, Massachusetts, New Hampshire, Rhode Island, Vermont)	July 29, 1999
NF	Nordic Flag Society	Nordic Europe (Denmark, Finland, Iceland, Norway, Sweden)	September 14, 1973
NVvV	Dutch Association for Vexillology	Netherlands	September 7, 1969
NZFA	New Zealand Flag Association	New Zealand	July 3, 1995
MGD	Macedonian Heraldic Society	North Macedonia	July 16, 2019
PFA	Portland Flag Association	United States (Oregon)	August 6, 2013
PTW	Polish Vexillology Society	Poland	July 3, 1995
RCVH	Russian Centre of Vexillology and Heraldry	Russia	July 28, 2003
SAVA	Southern African Vexillological Association	(Southern African Development Community) Southern Africa (Angola, Botswana, Lesotho, Madagascar, Malawi, Mozambique, Namibia, South Africa, Eswatini, Zambia, Zimbabwe)	July 2, 1991
SCHG	State Council of Heraldry at the Parliament of Georgia	Georgia	August 2, 2011
SEV	Spanish Society of Vexillology	Spain	June 29, 1979
SFV	French Society of Vexillology	France	July 1, 1991
SGHAPG	Society of Genealogy, Heraldry and Archivist "Paul Gore"	Moldova	July 23, 2001
SSV	Swiss Society for Vexillology	Switzerland	September 7, 1969
SVB	Belgium Vexillology Society	Belgium	June 29, 1979
SVI	Flag Data Center	Czech Republic	July 28, 2003
SVPR	Rotterdam Flag Parade Foundation	Netherlands	August 2, 2011
THVA	Transylvanian Heraldic and Vexillological Association	Romania (Transylvania)	July 12, 2022
UHT	Ukrainian Heraldry Society	Ukraine	July 3, 1995
VAST	Vexillological Association of the State of Texas	United States (Texas)	July 23, 2001
VSS	Vexillological Society (Singapore)	Singapore	July 12, 2022
WVRI	World Vexillological Research Institute	Germany	August 23, 1993

== International Congresses of Vexillology ==
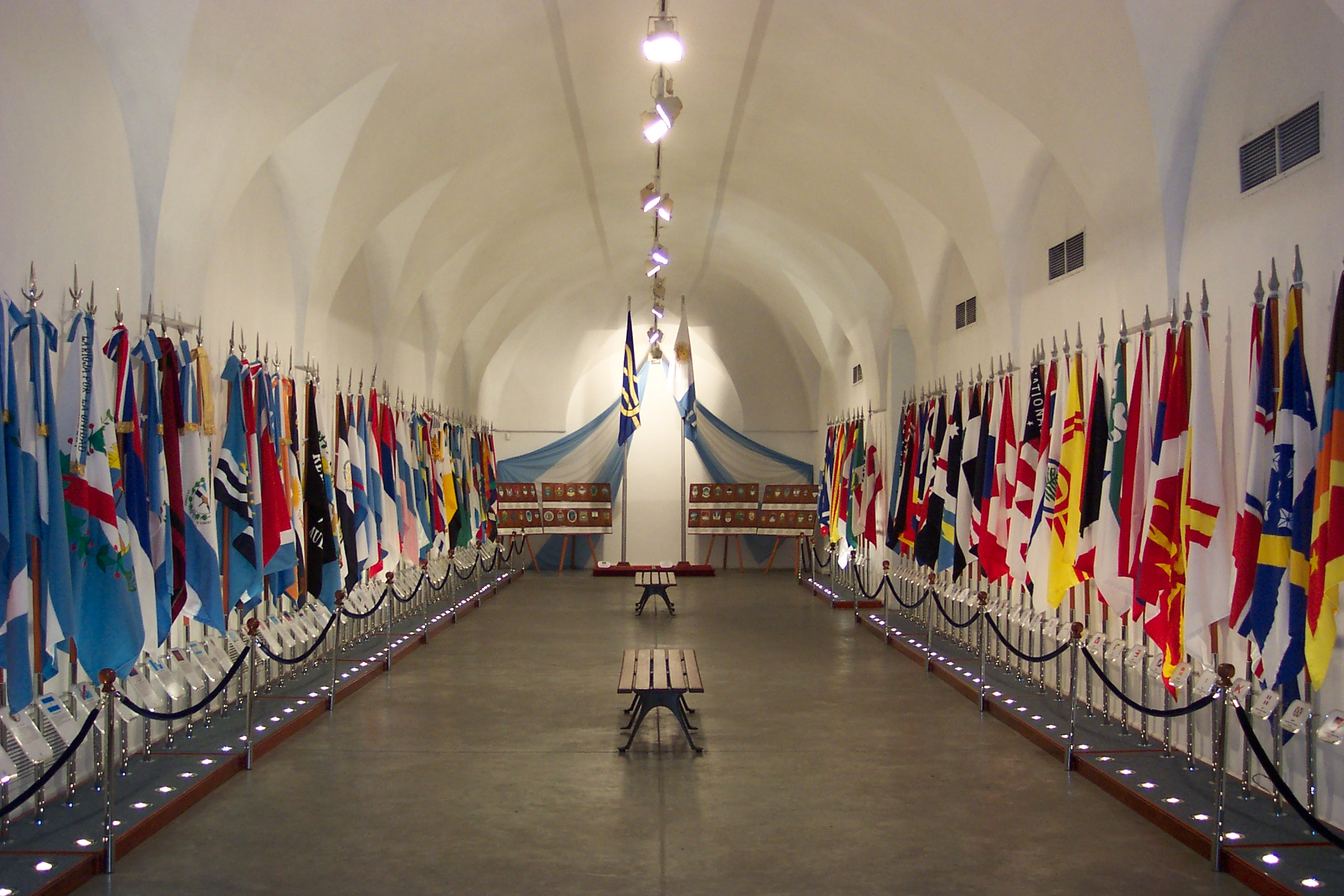
Argentine flags and flags of FIAV members during the 21st International Congresses of Vexillology in Buenos Aires

The International Congress of Vexillology is a week long biennial conference. A Congress consists of vexillology presentations, FIAV's General Assembly and flag display tours.

Since 1969, FIAV has sponsored the biennial International Congresses of Vexillology (ICV) with assistance of a local organizing committee. The Congresses have been held in:

- Muiderberg, Netherlands (1965)
- Zürich and Rüschlikon (1967)
- Boston (1969)
- Turin (1971)
- London (1973)
- IJsselmeer (1975)
- Washington, D.C. (1977)
- Vienna (1979)
- Ottawa (1981)
- Oxford (1983)
- Madrid (1985)
- San Francisco (1987)
- Melbourne (1989)
- Barcelona (1991)
- Zürich (1993)
- Warsaw (1995)
- Cape Town (1997)
- Victoria, British Columbia (1999)
- York (2001)
- Stockholm (2003)
- Buenos Aires (2005)
- Berlin (2007)
- Yokohama (2009)
- Washington, D.C. (2011)
- Rotterdam (2013)
- Sydney (2015)
- London (2017)
- San Antonio (2019)
- Ljubljana (2022)
- Beijing (2024)
- Paris (2026)

ICV 32 is to take place in Prague, Czech Republic in July 2028.

== FIAV flag ==
The FIAV flag was initially designed by Klaes Sierksma and slightly modified by the organizing committee of the Second International Congress of Vexillology. The flag was introduced on 3 September 1967. Its description is, "On a blue field, extending horizontally from hoist to fly, two yellow halyards forming two interlaced loops." The knot formed is a sheet bend. The color blue is defined as Pantone Matching System U293 and the color yellow is defined as Pantone Matching System U123. Flags for the three officers were approved in 1999, having been designed by the former FIAV president, William Crampton.

== FIAV honours and medals ==
Ribbon of the award Laureate of the Federation

Ribbon of the award Fellow of the Federation

Over the years, FIAV has established awards and honors to recognize individuals and organizations for vexillological work and service.

The two medals that come with post-nominals are the Laureates of the Federation who get LF and the Fellows of the Federation who get FF. These two awards consists of a certificate and a medal bearing the central knot device of the FIAV flag suspended from a neck (LF) or a chest (FF) ribbon of blue and yellow, the colors of the FIAV flag, a lapel pin and a ribbon bar.

In 1989, FIAV established The Vexilon, an award given for the most important contribution to vexillology in the two years before an International Congress of Vexillology. As of 2024, 17 awards have been given out to notable vexillologists such as William Crampton, Whitney Smith, and Alfred Znamierowski. Frederick Brownell, who designed the South African flag, received the award twice.

The Whitney Smith Award recognizes the best paper delivered during an International Congress of Vexillology. It was established in 2005 as the Best Paper award and renamed in 2017 honoring Whitney Smith. Even before the current award was formalized, a recognition of the “best paper” was bestowed sponsored by the International Association of Flag Manufacturers (IAFM) at least since 1999, known as the IAFM Award.
