= North American Vexillological Association =

Flag-studies organization

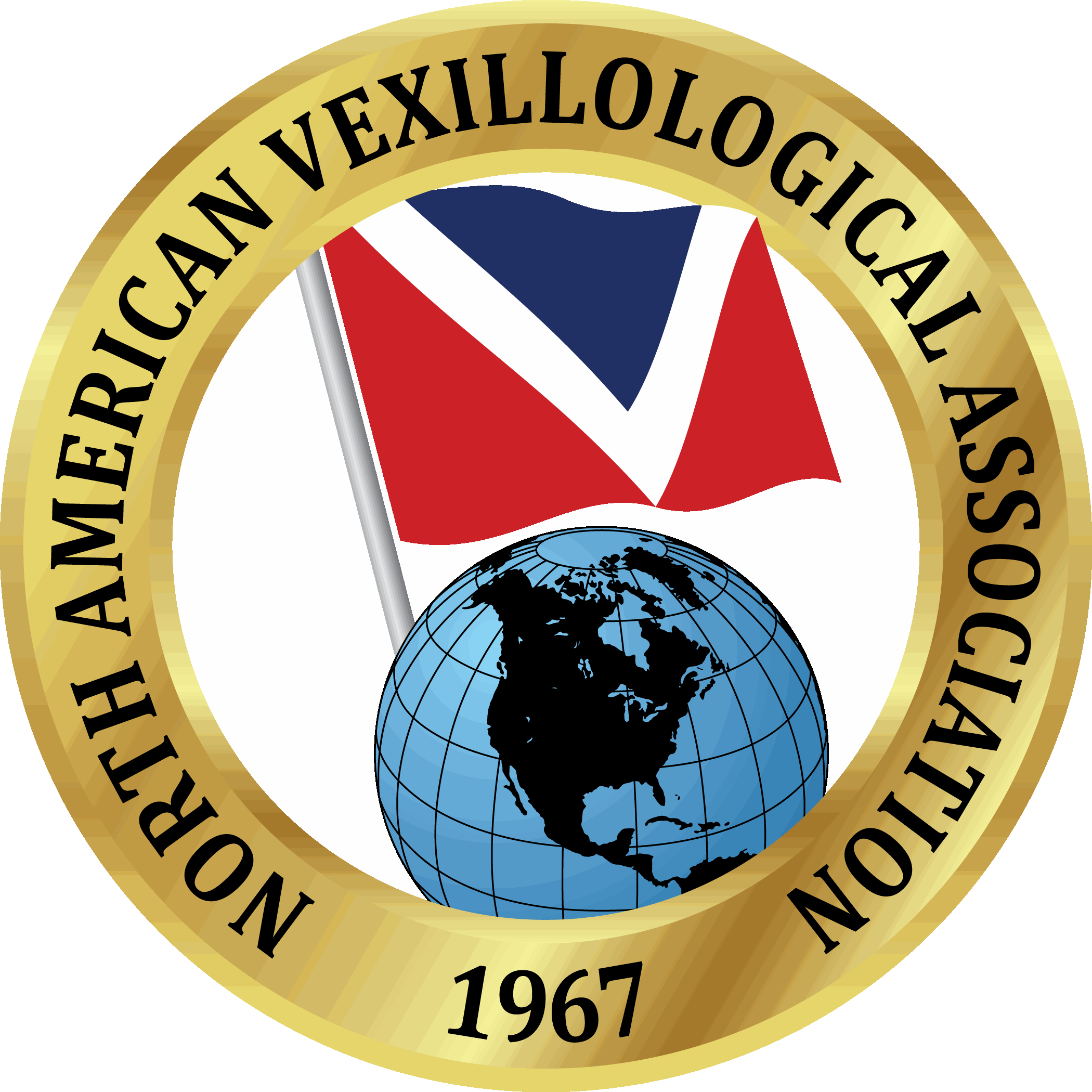
- Seal

- Flag
- Abbreviation: NAVA
- Formation: June 30, 1967; 59 years ago
- Founder: Whitney Smith
- Founded at: Boston, Massachusetts, U.S.
- Tax ID no.: 36-2669817
- Region served: North America
- Fields: Vexillology
- Official language: English
- President: Stanley K. Contrades
- Key people: Ted Kaye
- Website: nava.org

The North American Vexillological Association (NAVA) is a membership organization devoted to vexillology, the study of flags. It was founded in 1967 by American vexillologist Whitney Smith, and others. Its membership of 1,100+ comprises flag scholars, enthusiasts, designers, collectors, conservators, educators, merchants, manufacturers, historians, and hobbyists from most states and provinces of the United States and Canada, and more than 30 other countries.

In the 21st century, many state and municipal bodies have re-evaluated and introduced measures to change their flags, often influenced and initiated by NAVA's surveys on flag design. Some of their design processes have followed a set of flag design principles compiled by Ted Kaye and published by NAVA.

== History ==
=== 20th century ===
The North American Vexillological Association was founded in 1967 by Whitney Smith, a Harvard political science student with a lifelong passion for flag design.

In 1969, NAVA became a charter member of the International Federation of Vexillological Associations.

=== 21st century ===
In 2001, NAVA conducted a survey ranking all U.S. state and Canadian provincial flags. New Mexico and Quebec were ranked best among U.S. states and Canadian provinces, respectively. The flag of Georgia at the time scored lowest, reflecting a pattern observed in the survey results where flags that featured a state seal on a monochrome background tended to receive lower ratings.

This was followed by a 2004 survey of city flags, in which the flag of Washington, D.C. ranked first and Pocatello, Idaho ranked last. The survey results were published in the book American City Flags: 150 Flags from Akron to Yonkers by John M. Purcell and edited by Ted Kaye, who had run the survey. In 2022, NAVA conducted a follow-up survey assessing city flags redesigned since 2015. In this survey, the flag of Tulsa was ranked highest, Ranger, Texas lowest, and Pocatello, which had updated its flag in 2017, ranked 11th, reflecting the influence of the 2004 survey results.

In 2006, NAVA published "Good" Flag, "Bad" Flag, a general purpose guidebook to effective flag design, outlining five principles: avoiding letters and seals, simplicity, meaningful symbolism, two or three basic colors, and distinctiveness.

== Impact ==
NAVA members have also contributed to international flag design efforts. Prior to NAVA's founding, Whitney Smith assisted Guyanese President Cheddi Jagan in designing Guyana's new flag and later, in his capacity as president, advised governments on flags for Aruba, Bonaire, and the Saudi Arabian Navy. Decades later, in 2015, NAVA secretary Ted Kaye provided expertise to Fiji on a potential flag redesign, although the government ultimately decided not to proceed after an Olympic gold medal resulted in renewed national pride in the existing flag. In 2023, Kaye reprised his role as advisor, joining Brian Cham, a NAVA member, in advising the Minnesota State Emblems Redesign Commission (SERC).

NAVA's surveys and the publication of "Good" Flag, "Bad" Flag have significantly influenced public awareness and the redesign of flags across North America. By identifying poorly designed flags and highlighting best practices, NAVA inspired citizens, officials, and design committees to reevaluate existing state and city flags. In several cases, government officials have consulted NAVA members for expertise during the redesign process.

Critic Perry Dane contends that the result of "Good" Flag, "Bad" Flag was flag design trending towards "gimmicky sameness", and leading to a reduction in variety and "historical depth" of flags.

=== State flags ===
Since NAVA’s 2001 survey, several U.S. states have redesigned their flags, often citing and drawing upon the association’s published design principles. Mississippi, Georgia, Utah, and Minnesota all replaced their previous flags, citing both poor design and problematic imagery.

=== City flags ===
City flags have seen a similar transformation. American radio host and podcaster Roman Mars's TED Talk on city flag designs in early 2015, covering NAVA's five principles, spurred redesign efforts in cities across the United States. In cases such as Burlington, Vermont, and Norman, Oklahoma local committees also consulted Ted Kaye to select new designs.

Since 2015, over 300 U.S. cities have updated their flags or gained one.

== Annual meetings ==
Since its founding, the association has held annual meetings across the U.S. and Canada to present research, share knowledge, and honor vexillological achievements. Since 1977, it has marked each meeting with a distinctive flag.

NAVA honors achievement in the field through several honors and awards:

Award	Criteria	Notes
Captain William Driver Award	Presented to the individual who presents the best paper at the association's annual meeting.	—
The Vexillonnaire Award	Recognizes a flag scholar who becomes personally involved in a significant and successful act of creating, changing, or improving flag design, promoting good flag usage, or otherwise altering it for the better.	—
Kevin Harrington Award	Presented to the individual who authors the best article to appear in a non-vexillological publication during the preceding year.	—
John Purcell Award	Presented to an individual for an exemplary contribution that promotes public understanding of vexillology in North America.	—
Doreen Braverman Award	Presented to an organizational member who supports the association's mission by making a significant contribution to the vexillological community.	—
Whitney Smith Fellow	An individual who makes an outstanding contribution to North American vexillology may be elected to this honor by NAVA's executive board.	Honoree may use the postnominals "WSF"
Honorary Membership	Honors an individual who renders distinguished service to the association or to vexillology.	—

== Publications ==
In addition to "Good" Flag, "Bad" Flag and its surveys (NAVA 2001 Survey, NAVA 2004 Survey, and the NAVA 2022 Survey), NAVA publishes Raven and Vexillum, a quarterly magazine (combining the previous Flag Research Quarterly and NAVA News). They cover vexillological topics and inter-disciplinary discussion as well as the Association's proceedings and other vexillological news. NAVA also maintains an archive of case studies of their involvement in the redesign process of flags for cities and states across North America.

=== Raven ===
Raven: A Journal of Vexillology
- Discipline: Vexillology
- Language: English
- Edited by: Kenneth W. Reynolds

Publication details
- History: 1994–present
- Publisher: North American Vexillological Association (United States)
- Frequency: Annual

Standard abbreviations
- ISO 4: Raven

Raven: A Journal of Vexillology is a peer‑reviewed academic journal, published annually by NAVA and devoted to the scholarly study of flags. It was established in 1994 as NAVA's academic journal. The journal has issued thematic volumes on topics such as Native American flags, American and Canadian city flags, Russian regional flags, and Vatican flags.

The journal publishes research on:

- flag history and design
- symbolism and semiotics
- heraldry and emblematic traditions
- national, regional, and municipal flags
- indigenous and cultural flag traditions
- contemporary developments in flag usage

Raven accepts scholarly contributions in the field of vexillology. The journal is peer‑reviewed and overseen by an editorial board appointed by NAVA.

Back issues are available through the NAVA Digital Library, while recent issues are accessible to members. The journal is indexed in:

- Historical Abstracts
- America: History and Life

According to the Philosophy Documentation Center, Raven has published more than 70 papers and has received over 300 citations. The journal is listed and described by the Philosophy Documentation Center as an academic publication in vexillology.
