= Vexillology =

Study of flags

The flag of the International Federation of Vexillological Associations depicts a sheet bend.

Vexillology (/ˌvɛksɪˈlɒlədʒi/ VEK-sih-LOL-ə-jee) is the study of the history, symbolism and usage of flags or, by extension, any interest in flags in general.

A person who studies flags is called a vexillologist, a person who designs flags is a vexillographer, and the art of designing flags is called vexillography. A hobbyist or general admirer of flags is called a vexillophile.

== Etymology ==
The word vexillology is a synthesis of the Latin word vexillum (a kind of square flag which was carried by Roman cavalry) and the Greek suffix -logia ("study").

== History ==
American scholar Whitney Smith is acknowledged for conceiving "vexillology" in 1957. He wrote, "While the use of flags goes back to the earliest days of human civilization, the study of that usage in a serious fashion is so recent that the term for it did not appear in print until 1959." Before this time, the study of flags was generally considered a part of heraldry, the study of armorial bearings.

In 1961 American scholar Whitney Smith formalized Vexillology with the publication of The Flag Bulletin. During his lifetime, Smith organized various flag organizations and meetings including the first International Congress of Vexillology (ICV), the North American Vexillological Association (NAVA), and the International Federation of Vexillological Associations (FIAV).

Vexillology involves academic work in sociology, history, or design. It also includes contributions from the flag industry and interest from those passionate about flags. The ICV and local vexillological meetings often cover a wide range of interests in flags. Since 1969, an International Congress of Vexillology meeting has been organized every two years under the auspices of FIAV; papers presented at an ICV are published afterwards as the Congress's Proceedings.

== Vexillological organizations ==
The International Federation of Vexillological Associations (FIAV) is vexillology's international umbrella organization. Notable constituent organizations include the North American Vexillological Association, Deutsche Gesellschaft für Flaggenkunde (German Society for Flag Studies), the UK Flag Institute, and Flags of the World (FOTW).

== Flag design ==
The design of flags, known as vexillography, has its own set of widely cited principles. In 2006, the North American Vexillological Association published "Good" Flag, "Bad" Flag, a booklet compiled by Ted Kaye that outlined five basic principles of effective flag design: keep the design simple enough that a child could draw it from memory; use meaningful symbolism; limit colors to two or three that contrast well; avoid lettering or seals; and make the flag distinctive from others while remaining related to flags it shares context with. The booklet has since been translated into French, Spanish, German, Italian, and Portuguese.

== Vexillological symbols ==
Vexillologists use a standardized set of symbols to record information about flags in a compact, language-neutral form. The system was devised by Whitney Smith in the early 1970s and formally adopted by FIAV on August 27, 1981 as the Flag Information Code, with subsequent amendments in 1995 and 2001.

The core of the system is a two-by-three grid: the top row represents land use, the bottom row sea use, and the three columns represent civil, state, and military contexts respectively. A filled dot in any cell indicates that a flag is used in that context. Separate symbols indicate whether a flag is historical, proposed but never adopted, or has different designs on each side. Croatian vexillologist Željko Heimer later proposed extensions covering historical flags no longer in use and flags displayed vertically; these are in common use among vexillologists though not part of the official FIAV standard.

== Flag surveys and redesign ==
NAVA has conducted surveys ranking the flag designs of American states and cities. A 2004 survey of 150 municipal flags rated the flag of Pocatello, Idaho lowest, with a score of 1.48 out of 10. A follow-up survey in 2022 assessed 312 redesigned flags, with Tulsa's updated flag ranking first.

Since the 2004 survey, several U.S. states have redesigned their flags, often citing NAVA's published design principles. Minnesota redesigned its state flag in 2024 with input from NAVA member Ted Kaye, who served as advisor to the state's Emblems Redesign Commission.

== Popular interest ==
Public awareness of vexillology increased substantially after 2015, when radio producer Roman Mars delivered a TED Talk titled Why city flags may be the worst-designed thing you've never noticed. The talk drew on Kaye's Good Flag, Bad Flag principles and criticized the design of several prominent American city flags.

== See also ==
- Glossary of vexillology
- List of flags by design
- List of national flags by design
- List of vexillologists
- Vexilloid
- Vexillological symbol
