= List of flags with English-language text =

This is a list of flags that are inscribed with English-language text.

== # ==
Flag	Dates used	English text
10th Mountain Division	2001–present	MOUNTAIN
101st Airborne Division	2001–present	AIRBORNE
82nd Airborne Division	2001–present	1. AIRBORNE; 2. AA; [abbreviation of "All American"]

== A ==
Flag	Dates used	English text	
	Annapolis Royal	–present	ANNAPOLIS ROYAL N.S.
Albay	—present	1. PROVINCE OF ALBAY; 2. OFFICIAL SEAL	
Anne Arundel County, Maryland	1997–1998	1. ANNE ARUNDEL COUNTY; 2. MARYLAND	
Antigua and Barbuda (Governor)	1967–81	EACH ENDEAVOURING ALL ACHIEVING	
Antigua and Barbuda (Governor-General)	2023–present	ANTIGUA AND BARBUDA	
Antique Province	–present	1. PROVINCE OF ANTIQUE; 2. OFFICIAL SEAL	
Arkansas	1913–present	ARKANSAS	
Appomattox County, Virginia	–present	1. APPOMATTOX COUNTY; 2. 1845; 3. THE HEART OF VIRGINIA	
Argyle, Nova Scotia	–present	1. ARGYLE MUNICIPALITY; 2. EST. 1880; 3. INDUSTRY; 4. N.S.; [abbreviation of "Nova Scotia"]	
Atlanta	–present	1. 1847; 2. 1865; 3. ATLANTA GA	
Augusta County, Virginia	–present	1. AUGUSTA COUNTY; 2. 1738; 3. AUGUSTA	
Austin, Texas	2000–2014	CITY OF AUSTIN	
Australia (Governor-General)	1936–present	COMMONWEALTH OF AUSTRALIA	
Australia (royal standard)	1962–2022	E [abbreviation of "Elizabeth II"]	
Autonomous Region in Muslim Mindanao	–1992	1. AUTONOMOUS REGION IN MUSLIM MINDANAO; 2. OFFICIAL SEAL	

== B ==
Flag	Dates used	English text
Bahamas	1648–1973	BAHAMAS
Bahamas (Governor-General)	1961–71	COMMONWEALTH OF THE BAHAMAS
Bangladesh Chief of Army Staff	1972–present	CHIEF OF ARMY STAFF
Bangladesh Directorate General of Forces Intelligence	1977–present	BANGLADESH DIRECTORATE GENERAL OF FORCES INTELLIGENCE
Bangladesh Army East Bengal Regiment	1948 – present	THE EAST BENGAL REGIMENT
Bangladesh Army Para Commando Brigade	2016–Present	PARA COMANDO
Bangladesh Army President Guard Regiment	1976–Present	GUARDS
Bangladesh Special Security Force	1986–present	BANGLADESH SPECIAL SECURITY FORCE
Barbados	1870–1966	BARBADOS
Barbados (Governor-General)	1966–present	BARBADOS
Barbados (royal standard)	1970s–2021	E [abbreviation of "Elizabeth II"]
Bay County, Florida	–present	1. BAY COUNTY; 2. FLORIDA
Bayonne, New Jersey	–present	1. CITY OF BAYONNE; 2. NEW JERSEY
Belize (Governor-General)	1981–present	BELIZE
Belize City	–present	1. BELIZE CITY COUNCIL; 2. government of your service
Belmopan	–present	1. THE CITY OF BELMOPAN; 2. CITY OF PROMISE
Billings, Montana	1986–present	1. STAR OF THE BIG SKY COUNTRY; 2. BILLINGS; 3. MONTANA
Birmingham, Alabama	1925–present	1. Official Seal; 2. Birmingham, Alabama
Bomet County	–present	BOMET COUNTY
Brevard County, Florida	–present	1. SEAL OF BREVARD COUNTY; 2. 1514; 3. 1854; 4. 1969; 5. FLORIDA
Bridgeport, Connecticut	–present	1. City of Bridgeport; 2. SEAL OF THE CITY OF BRIDGEPORT, CONNECTICUT; 3. INCORPORATED 1836; 4. Connecticut
Bridgewater, Massachusetts	–present	1. BRIDGEWATER; 2. PLYMOUTH COUNTY; 3. MASSACHUSETTS; 4. INCORPORATED 1656
British Antarctic Territory	1963–present	RESEARCH AND DISCOVERY
British Antarctic Territory (Commissioner)	1963–present	RESEARCH AND DISCOVERY
British Cameroons	1922–61	BRITISH CAMEROON
British Columbia	1870–71	B C [abbreviation of "British Columbia"]
British Empire (unofficial)	1910–45	ADVANCE AUSTRALIA
British Hong Kong	1871–76	H.K. [abbreviation of "Hong Kong"]
British Hong Kong	1959–97	HONG KONG
British Hong Kong (Governor)	1959–97	HONG KONG
British India	1863–1947	HEAVEN'S LIGHT OUR GUIDE
British India (Governor-General)	1885–1947	HEAVEN'S LIGHT OUR GUIDE
British Windward Islands	1886–1953	1. GOVERNOR IN CHIEF; 2. WINDWARD ISLANDS
British Windward Islands (Governor-in-chief)	1886–1960	1. GOVERNOR IN CHIEF; 2. WINDWARD ISLANDS
Brooklyn, New York City, New York	–present	Borough of Brooklyn
Bulacan	–present	1. PROVINCE OF BULACAN; 2. OFFICIAL SEAL
Bureau of Alcohol, Tobacco, Firearms and Explosives	2004–present	BUREAU OF ALCOHOL, TOBACCO, FIREARMS AND EXPLOSIVES
Bureau of Alcohol, Tobacco, Firearms and Explosives	2004–present	1. BUREAU OF ALCOHOL, TOBACCO, FIREARMS AND EXPLOSIVES; 2. 1972
Bureau of Land Management	2008–present	1. U.S. DEPARTMENT OF THE INTERIOR; 2. BUREAU OF LAND MANAGEMENT
Busan, South Korea		1. Dynamic; 2. BUSAN; 3. Asian Gateway

== C ==
Flag	Dates used	English text
Calaveras County, California	–present	CALAVERAS COUNTY
California	1911–present	CALIFORNIA REPUBLIC
California Republic	1846	CALIFORNIA REPUBLIC
Canada (Andrew Mountbatten-Windsor)	2013–present	A [abbreviation of "Andrew"]
Canada (Duke of Cambridge)	2011–22	W [abbreviation of "William"]
Canada (Duke of Edinburgh)	2014–present	E [abbreviation of "Edward"]
Canada (Governor General)	1931–81	CANADA
Canada (Princess Royal)	2013–present	A [abbreviation of "Anne"]
Canada (royal standard)	1962–2022	E [abbreviation of "Elizabeth II"]
Caroline County, Maryland	–present	1. THE GREAT SEAL OF CAROLINE COUNTY IN MARYLAND; 2. 1773
Carroll County, Maryland	1977–present	1. CARROLL COUNTY; 2. 1837; 3. MARYLAND
Cayman Islands	1958–present	HE HATH FOUNDED IT UPON THE SEAS [a verse from Psalms chapter 24]
Cayman Islands (Civil Ensign)	1958–present	HE HATH FOUNDED IT UPON THE SEAS
Cayman Islands (Governor)	1958–present	HE HATH FOUNDED IT UPON THE SEAS
Central Intelligence Agency	2001–present	1. CENTRAL INTELLIGENCE AGENCY; 2. UNITED STATES OF AMERICA
Central Province, Sri Lanka	1987–present	CENTRAL PROVINCE
Ceylon (Governor-General)	1948–72	CEYLON
Charles County, Maryland	–present	1. 1658; 2. CHARLES COVNTY
Chiayi County	–present	CHIAYI COUNTY
Clarke County, Virginia	–present	1. THE COUNTY OF CLARKE; 2. VIRGINIA 1836
Clay County, Florida	–present	1. THE GREAT SEAL OF THE PEOPLE OF CLAY COUNTY; 2. FLORIDA
Clearfield County, Pennsylvania	–present	1. CLEARFIELD COUNTY; 2. ESTABLISHED 1804
Cleburne County, Alabama	2003–present	1. CLEBURNE COUNTY; 2. ALABAMA
Cleveland	1895–present	1. CLEVELAND; 2. 1796; 3. PROGRESS & PROSPERITY
Collier County, Florida	–present	1. COLLIER COUNTY; 2. FLORIDA
Colorado	1907–11	UNION AND CONSTITUTION
Customs and Border Protection Office of Field Operations	–present	1. U.S. CUSTOMS AND BORDER PROTECTION; 2. FIELD OPERATIONS

== D ==
Flag	Dates used	English text
Dallas	1967–present	1. CITY OF DALLAS; 2. TEXAS
Dallas	1916–67	DALLAS
Delaware	1913–present	1. LIBERTY AND INDEPENDENCE; 2. DECEMBER 7, 1787
Delaware County, Pennsylvania	–present	1. COUNTY OF DELAWARE; 2. PENNSYLVANIA; 3. VIRTUE LIBERTY AND INDEPENDENCE
Detroit	1948–present	1. THE CITY OF DETROIT; 2. MICHIGAN
Director of Central Intelligence	2005	1. DIRECTOR OF CENTRAL INTELLIGENCE; 2. INTELLIGENCE COMMUNITY
Drug Enforcement Administration	2001–present	1. U.S. JUSTICE DEPARTMENT; 2. DRUG ENFORCEMENT ADMINISTRATION
Link to image Dutchess County, New York	–present	1. DUCHESS COUNTY; 2. SEAL

== E ==
Flag	Dates used	English text
Edmonton, Canada	1966–1986	1. EDMONTON; 2. INDUSTRY INTEGRITY PROGRESS; 3. THE CITY OF EDMONTON
Edmonton, Canada	1986–present	1. EDMONTON; 2. INDUSTRY INTEGRITY PROGRESS
El Dorado County, California	2009–present	1. EL DORADO COUNTY; 2. CALIFORNIA
Elgeyo-Marakwet County	–present	1. ELGEYO MARAKWET COUNTY; 2. COUNTY OF CHAMPIONS
Queen Elizabeth II (personal flag)	1960–2022	E [abbreviation of "Elizabeth II"]
El Monte, California	2004–present	1. Friendly; 2. CITY OF EL MONTE; 3. END OF THE SANTA FE; 4. INC. 1912; 5. CALIFORNIA; 6. El Monte
El Paso, Texas	1962–present	1. CITY OF EL PASO; 2. TEXAS
El Paso, Texas	1948–1960	1. CITY OF EL PASO; 2. TEXAS
Erie, Pennsylvania	–present	1. CITY OF ERIE PENNSYLVANIA; 2. ESTABLISHED 1795; 3. INCORPORATED APRIL 14, 1851
Eritrea (President)	1993–present	THE STATE OF ERITREA

== F ==
Flag	Dates used	English text
Fairfax County, Virginia	1968–present	1. COUNTY OF FAIRFAX; 2. 1742; 3. VIRGINIA
Fairfield, Ohio		1. FAIRFIELD, OHIO; 2. 1955; 3. City of Opportunity
Falkland Islands	1925–present	DESIRE THE RIGHT
Falls County, Texas	1985–present	1. FALLS COUNTY; 2. 1850
Federally Administered Tribal Areas	–present	F A T A [abbreviation of "Federally Administered Tribal Areas"]
Federal Aviation Administration	2001–present	1. FEDERAL AVIATION; 2. ADMINISTRATION
Federal Bureau of Investigation	1993–present	1. DEPARTMENT OF JUSTICE; 2. FIDELITY BRAVERY INTEGRITY; 3. FEDERAL BUREAU OF INVESTIGATION
Federal Bureau of Prisons	2009–present	1. DEPARTMENT OF JUSTICE; 2. FEDERAL BUREAU OF PRISONS
Federal Emergency Management Agency	1999–2003	FEDERAL EMERGENCY MANAGEMENT AGENCY
Federation of Rhodesia and Nyasaland (Governor-General)	1953–63	FEDERATION OF RHODESIA AND NYASALAND
Ferguson, Missouri	1994–present	1. FERGUSON; 2. est.; 3. 1894; 4. COMMUNITY OF CHOICE
FIFA	2009–present	For the Game. For the World.
Fiji (Governor-General)	1970–87	FIJI
First Navy Jack	2002–present	DONT TREAD ON ME
Florida	1900–present	1. GREAT SEAL OF THE STATE OF FLORIDA; 2. IN GOD WE TRUST
Fort Wayne, Indiana	1934–present	1. FORT WAYNE; 2. 1794; 3. INDIANA

== G ==
Flag	Dates used	English text
Gadsden flag	1775–present	DONT TREAD ON ME
Gambia Colony and Protectorate	1889–1965	G. [abbreviation of "Gambia"]
The Gambia (Governor-General)	1965–70	THE GAMBIA
The Gambia (President)	1970–present	PROGRESS PEACE PROSPERITY
Garrett County, Maryland	–present	1. GARRETT COUNTY; 2. 1872; 3. MARYLAND
Georgia, State of	1902–present	1. CONSTITUTION; 2. WISDOM; 3. JUSTICE; 4. MODERATION; 5. IN GOD WE TRUST
Ghana (Governor-General)	1957–60	GHANA
Gloucester County, New Jersey	–present	1. THE GREAT SEAL OF THE COUNTY OF GLOUCESTER, NEW JERSEY; 2. COUNTY OF GLOUCESTER; 3. 1686
Gold Coast	1821–1957	G.C. [abbreviation of "Gold Coast"]
Greenbush, Maine	–present	1. LIVING & GROWING; 2. 1834; 3. 1984; 4. GREENBUSH. MAINE
Grenada (Governor-General)	1974–present	GRENADA
Guadalcanal Province	–present	GUADALCANAL PROVINCE
Guam	1948–present	GUAM
Guyana (Governor-General)	1966–70	GUYANA
Gweru	1986–present	PROGRESS

== H ==
Flag	Dates used	English text
Haifa	–present	HAIFA
Hampton Inn & Suites	–present	1. Hampton; 2. Inn & Suites; 3. by HILTON; 4. TM
Harford County, Maryland	–present	1. HARFORD COUNTY; 2. AT THE RISQUE OF OUR LIVES AND FORTUNES; 3. 1773
Hawaii (Governor)	1959–present	HAWAII
Territory of Hawaii (Governor)	1900–59	TH [abbreviation of "Territory of Hawaii"]
Henrico County, Virginia	–present	1. CITY 1611; 2. SHIRE 1634; 3. MANGER 1934; 4. COUNTY OF HENRICO. VIRGINIA
Hidalgo County, Texas	1985–present	1. HIDALGO COUNTY; 2. 1852
Hillsborough County, Florida	–present	Hillsborough County
Hollywood, Florida	–present	1. CITY OF HOLLYWOOD, FLORIDA; 2. DIAMOND OF THE GOLD COAST; 3. INCORPORATED 1925
Homa Bay County	–present	HOMA BAY COUNTY
Honiara	–present	1. CITY OF HONIARA; 2. NATIONAL CAPITAL
Honolulu	–present	1. CITY AND COUNTY OF HONOLULU; 2. STATE OF HAWAII
Hualien County	–present	1. Hualien; 2. Hualien County

== I ==
Flag	Dates used	English text
Idaho	1957–present	1. GREAT SEAL OF THE STATE OF IDAHO; 2. STATE OF IDAHO
Illinois	1915–present	1. STATE SOVEREIGNTY; 2. NATIONAL UNION; 3. ILLINOIS
Imperial County, California	2016–present	IMPERIAL COUNTY
India (Governor-General)	1947–50	INDIA
Indiana	1917–present	INDIANA
Innisfail, Canada	–present	TOWN OF INNISFAIL ALBERTA
Iowa	1921–present	1. OUR LIBERTIES WE PRIZE AND OUR RIGHTS WE WILL MAINTAIN; 2. IOWA
Iraqi Army	–present	Iraqi Ground Forces
Iraqi Navy	–present	1. IqN; 2. IRAQI NAVY

== J ==
Flag	Dates used	English text
Jamaica	1962	OUT OF MANY, ONE PEOPLE
Jamaica (Governor)	1962	OUT OF MANY, ONE PEOPLE
Jamaica (Governor-General)	1962–present	JAMAICA
Jamaica (royal standard)	1962–2022	E [abbreviation of "Elizabeth II"]
Johannesburg	1997–present	UNITY IN DEVELOPMENT
Juneau, Alaska	2005–present	1. JUNEAU; 2. ALASKA'S CAPITAL CITY

== K ==
Flag	Dates used	English text
Kaifeng	2006–present	KAIFENG CHINA [twice]
Kanchanaburi	1960s–present	-
Kansas	1961–present	KANSAS
Kentucky	1918–present	1. COMMONWEALTH OF KENTUCKY; 2. UNITED WE STAND DIVIDED WE FALL
Kenya (Governor-General)	1963–64	KENYA
Kosovo Force	2008–09	KFOR [abbreviation of "Kosovo Force"]
Kings County, California	2001–present	1. 1893; 2. COUNTY OF KINGS; 3. CALIFORNIA
Katipunan	1896–98	1. PHILIPPINE REVOLUTION; 2. KATIPUNAN; 3. PHILIPPINES

== L ==
Flag	Dates used	English text
Lagos	–present	JUSTICE AND PROGRESS
Laguna	–present	1. PROVINCE OF LAGUNA; 2. OFFICIAL SEAL
Laikipia County	–present	1. COUNTY GOVERNMENT OF KAIKIPIA; 2. ONE PEOPLE ONE COUNTY ONE DESTINY
Lake County, Florida	2005–present	1. LAKE; 2. COUNTY; 3. FLORIDA
Lakes State	–present	LAKES STATE
Lancaster, Pennsylvania	–present	1. 1730; 2. 1907; 3. Lancaster, Pennsylvania
Las Vegas	–present	1. CITY OF LAS VEGAS; 2. NEVADA
Liberia (President)	–present	1. THE LOVE OF LIBERTY BROUGHT US HERE; 2. REPUBLIC OF LIBERIA
Leon County, Florida	–present	1. LEON; 2. FLORIDA'S CAPITAL COUNTY
Lincoln, Maine	–present	1. LINCOLN MAINE; 2. THE GATEWAY TOWN; 3. 1829
Little Havana, Florida	2018–present	LITTLE HAVANA, U.S.A [abbreviation of "United States of America"]
Lloydminster	–present	1. CITY OF LLOYDMINSTER; 2. ALBERTA; 3. SASKATCHEWAN
Los Angeles, California	–present	1. CITY OF LOS ANGELES; 2. FOUNDED 1781
Los Angeles County, California	–present	1. LOS ANGELES COUNTY [twice]; 2. CALIFORNIA
Los Angeles County Fire Department	2001–present	1. PROUD PROTECTORS; 2. COUNTY OF LOS ANGELES; 3. FIRE DEPARTMENT; 4. COUNTY OF LOS ANGELES FIRE DEPARTMENT
Los Angeles Police Department	1993–present	1. LOS ANGELES POLICE DEPARTMENT; 2. TO PROTECT AND TO SERVE
Los Gatos, California	2008–present	1. TOWN OF; 2. LOS GATOS; 3. INCORPORATED 1887; 4. THE GEM OF THE FOOTHILLS
Louisiana	2010–present	UNION JUSTICE CONFIDENCE
Louisville, Kentucky	2003–present	1. LOUISVILLE; 2. JEFFERSON COUNTY; 3. METRO; 4. 1778
Loveland, Ohio		1. 1796; 2. LOVELAND
Luxor Governorate	–present	LUXOR

== M ==
Flag	Dates used	English text
Madera County, California	2009–present	1. MADERA; 2. Established 1893; 3. State of California; 4. COUNTY
Maine	1909–present	MAINE
Malawi (Governor-General)	1964–66	MALAWI
Malawi (President)	1966–present	MALAWI
Malta	1943–64	FOR GALLANTRY
Malta	1964–present	FOR GALLANTRY
Malta (Governor-General)	1964–74	MALTA
Malta (royal standard)	1967–74	1. FOR GALLANTRY; 2. E; [abbreviation of "Elizabeth II"]
Mandatory Palestine	1920–48	PALESTINE
Mariposa County, California	–present	MARIPOSA COUNTY
Markham, Canada	2012–present	1. CITY OF MARKHAM; 2. 1850; 3. 1872; 4. 1971; 5. 2012; 6. CORPORATION
Marsabit County	–present	COUNTY GOVERNMENT OF MARSABIT
Maryland Motor Vehicle Administration	–present	1. MVA; 2. Motor Vehicle Administration
Matrouh Governorate	–present	Matrouh Governorate
Mauritius (Governor-General)	1968–92	MAURITIUS
Mauritius (President)	1992–present	RM [abbreviation of "Republic of Mauritius"]
Mauritius (royal standard)	1968–92	E [abbreviation of "Elizabeth II"]
Metropolitan Police Department of the District of Columbia	2002–present	1. METROPOLITAN POLICE DEPARTMENT; 2. METROPOLITAN POLICE; 3. DISTRICT OF COLUMBIA
Miami-Dade County, Florida	2007–present	1. MIAMI-DADE COUNTY; 2. FLORIDA
Milwaukee	1955–present	1. MILWAUKEE; 2. 1846
Minnesota	1893–2024	1. 1858; 2. 1819; 3. 1893; 4. MINNESOTA
Mississauga, Canada	–present	1. CITY OF MISSISSAUGA; 2. INCORPORATED 1974
Mississippi	2020–present	IN GOD WE TRUST
Missouri	1913	UNITED WE STAND DIVIDED WE FALL
Mobile, Alabama	1968–present	1. SEAL OF THE CITY OF MOBILE, ALABAMA; 2. FROM ENCHANTING TRADITION; 3. MOBILE ALABAMA; 4. ENDURING PROGRESS; 5. FOUNDED 1702
Mombasa County	2013–present	MOMBASA COUNTY
Montana	1981–present	MONTANA
Montgomery County, Maryland	1944–76	1. 1776; 2. 1936; 3. MONTGOMERY COUNTY MARYLAND
Montgomery Village, Maryland	2008–present	1. MONTGOMERY; 2. VILLAGE
Mutare	1985–present	JUSTICE AND FREEDOM

== N ==
Flag	Dates used	English text
Namibia (President)	1990–present	UNITY LIBERTY JUSTICE
Nantou County	–present	NANTOU COUNTY
Nashville	1963–present	METROPOLITAN GOVERNMENT OF NASHVILLE AND DAVIDSON COUNTY
Colony of Natal	1905–10	NATAL
National Aeronautics and Space Administration	1960–present	1. NATIONAL AERONAUTICS AND SPACE ADMINISTRATION; 2. U.S.A.; [abbreviation of "United States of America"]
National Capital District (Papua New Guinea)	–present	1. NATIONAL CAPITAL DISTRICT COMMISSION; 2. N C D C
National Oceanic and Atmospheric Administration Commissioned Officer Corps	2002–present	1. NOAA COMMISSIONED CORPS
National Park Service	2003–present	NATIONAL PARK SERVICE
National Security Agency	2001–present	1. NATIONAL SECURITY AGENCY; 2. UNITED STATES OF AMERICA
National Socialist Movement	2006–present	1. NSM; [abbreviation of "National Socialist Movement"]: 2. USA; [abbreviation of "United States of America"]
Nebraska	1963–present	1. GREAT SEAL OF THE STATE OF NEBRASKA; 2. MARCH 1ST 1867; 3. EQUALITY BEFORE THE LAW
Nevada	1929–present	1. BATTLE BORN; 2. NEVADA
Nevada	1905–15	1. SILVER; 2. NEVADA; 3. GOLD
Nevada	1915–21	1. NEVADA; 2. ALL FOR OUR COUNTRY
Nevada (Governor)	1929–present	1. BATTLE BORN; 2. NEVADA
Newark, New Jersey	–present	1. NEWARK, NEW JERSEY; 2. INCORPORATED 1836
Territory of New Guinea/Territory of Papua and New Guinea	1914–65	T.N.G. [abbreviation of "Territory of New Guinea"]
New Hampshire	1931–present	1. SEAL OF THE STATE OF NEW HAMPSHIRE; 2. 1776
New Hebrides	1906–80	NEW HEBRIDES
New Hebrides (Commissioner)	1906–80	NEW HEBRIDES
New Jersey	1896–present	1. LIBERTY AND PROSPERITY; 2. 1776
New York City	1977–present	1625
New Zealand	1867–69	NZ [abbreviation of "New Zealand"]
New Zealand (Governor)	1874–1908	NZ [abbreviation of "New Zealand"]
New Zealand (Governor-General)	1953–2008	NEW ZEALAND
New Zealand (royal standard)	1962–2022	E [abbreviation of "Elizabeth II"]
Niger Coast Protectorate	1893–1900	NIGER COAST PROTECTORATE
Nigeria Protectorate	1914–60	NIGERIA
Nigeria (Governor-General)	1960–63	FEDERATION OF NIGERIA
Nigeria (President)	1963–78	1. PRESIDENT; 2. FEDERAL REPUBLIC OF NIGERIA
Nigeria (President)	1978–present	UNITY AND FAITH, PEACE AND PROGRESS
Nigeria (state flag)	1978–present	UNITY AND FAITH, PEACE AND PROGRESS
Northampton County, Pennsylvania	–present	1. COUNTY OF NORTHAMPTON; 2. 1752
North Carolina	1885–present	1. MAY 20th 1775; 2. N C; [abbreviation of "North Carolina"]: 3. APRIL 12th 1776
North Carolina	1861–65	1. MAY 20TH 1775; 2. MAY 20TH 1861
North Dakota	1943–present	NORTH DAKOTA
North Dakota (Governor)	–present	STRENGTH FROM THE SOIL
Northern Ireland (Government Ensign)	1929–73	GNI [abbreviation of "Government of Northern Ireland"]
Northern Nigeria Protectorate	1900–14	NORTHERN NIGERIA
North Yarmouth, Maine	–present	1. NORTH YARMOUTH, MAINE; 2. Incorporated 1680
Nyandarua County	–present	1. NYANDARUA COUNTY; 2. GOVERNMENT

== O ==
Flag	Dates used	English text
Oakland, California	1952–present	1. OAKLAND; 2. 1852
Ocean County, New Jersey	2001–present	1. OCEAN COUNTY; 2. NEW JERSEY
Okaloosa County, Florida	–present	1. OKALOOSA COUNTY; 2. Board of County Commissioners
Oklahoma	1941–present	OKLAHOMA
Oklahoma (Governor)	–present	1. GREAT SEAL OF THE STATE OF OKLAHOMA; 2. 1907
Ontario, California	2012–present	1. CITY OF ONTARIO CALIF.; 2. BALANCED COMMUNITY; 3. INCORPORATED 1891
Orange County, California	–present	1. COUNTY OF ORANGE; 2. CALIFORNIA
Orange County, Florida	–present	1. ORANGE COUNTY; 2. FLORIDA
Oregon (obverse)	1925–present	1. STATE OF OREGON; 2. THE UNION; 3. 1859
Oriental Mindoro	–present	1. PROVINCE OF ORIENTAL MINDORO; 2. OFFICIAL SEAL
Osceola County, Florida	–present	1. OSCEOLA COUNTY; 2. 1887
Ottawa, Canada	1987–2000	1. OTTAWA; 2. ADVANCE

== P ==
Flag	Dates used	English text
Pakistan (Governor-General)	1947–56	PAKISTAN
Palm Beach County, Florida	–present	1. PALM BEACH COUNTY; 2. FLORIDA
Panama Canal Zone	–1979	1. SEAL OF THE CANAL ZONE; 2. ISTHMUS OF PANAMA; 3. THE LAND DIVIDED THE WORLD UNITED
Territory of Papua	1906–49	PAPUA
Papua New Guinea (Governor-General)	1975–present	PAPUA NEW GUINEA
Pasco County, Florida	–present	1. PASCO COUNTY; 2. 1887; 3. FLORIDA
Peleliu	–present	STATE OF PELELIU
Pennsylvania	1907–present	VIRTUE LIBERTY AND INDEPENDENCE
Pennsylvania (Governor)	–present	1. THE GOVERNOR; 2. VIRTUE LIBERTY AND INDEPENDENCE; 3. COMMONWEALTH OF PENNSYLVANIA
Perry County, Pennsylvania	–present	1. PERRY COUNTY; 2. PENNSYLVANIA
Philippines (President)	1946–48	REPUBLIC OF THE PHILIPPINES
Pierce County, Washington	2011–present	PIERCE COUNTY
Pingtung County	–present	PING TUNG COUNTY
Placer County, California	2019–present	1. COUNTY OF PLACER; 2. STATE OF CALIFORNIA
Port Vila	–present	CITY OF PORT VILA
Prince George's County, Maryland	1963–present	1. PRINCE GEORGE'S COUNTY; 2. MARYLAND
Provo, Utah	1985–2015	Provo
Prince William County, Virginia	–present	THE SEAL OF PRINCE WILLIAM COUNTY VA.

== Q ==
Flag	Dates used	English text
Queens, New York City	–present	1. QVEENS BOROVGH; 2. 1898

== R ==
Flag	Dates used	English text
Red Deer, Canada	1977–present	1. CITY OF RED DEER; 2. 1901; 3. 1913; 4. EDUCATION INTEGRITY PROGRESS
Red Oak, Iowa	2010–present	RED OAK, IOWA
Riverside County, California	–present	1. California; 2. COUNTY OF RIVERSIDE; 3. MAY 9, 1893
Rhode Island	1877–82	HOPE
Rhode Island	1897–present	HOPE
Rhode Island (Governor)	–present	1.STATE OF RHODE ISLAND; 2. HOPE
Richmond Hill, Canada	–present	1.TOWN OF RICHMOND HILL; 2. Incorporated 1873
Rochester, New York	(unofficial) 1910–1934 (official) 1934–present	ROCHESTER
(non-free flag) Rochester, New York (unofficial)	1979–present	1. FLOUR CITY; 2. FLOWER CITY; 3. CITY OF ROCHESTER, N.Y.
Roman Catholic Diocese of Arlington		1. Diocese of Arlington; 1. Virginia, U.S.A.
Roman Catholic Diocese of Brooklyn		DIOCESE OF BROOKLYN
Roman Catholic Diocese of Greensburg		1. DIOCESE OF GREENSBURG; 1. Greensburg, Pennsylvania

== S ==
Flag	Dates used	English text
Saskatoon, Canada	–present	COMMERCE INDUSTRY EDUCATION
St. Catharines	–present	INDUSTRY AND LIBERALITY
Saint Christopher-Nevis-Anguilla (Governor)	1967–80	St. CHRISTOPHER NEVIS ANGUILLA
St. Johns County, Florida	1996–present	1. ST. JOHNS COUNTY; 2. FLORIDA
Saint Kitts and Nevis (Governor)	1980–83	SAINT CHRISTOPHER AND NEVIS
Saint Kitts and Nevis (Governor-General)	1983–present	COUNTRY ABOVE SELF
Saint Lucia (Governor-General)	1979–present	SAINT LUCIA
Collectivity of Saint Martin	–present	French Caribbean
Saint Vincent and the Grenadines (Governor-General)	1979–present	ST VINCENT AND THE GRENADINES
Salt Lake City	2006–present	SALT LAKE CITY
Salt Lake City	1969–2006	1. "THIS IS THE PLACE"; 2. SALT LAKE CITY
San Bernardino County, California	–present	1. COUNTY OF SAN BERNARDINO; 2. 1853; 3. County of San Bernardino
San Diego	1934–present	1. THE CITY OF SAN DIEGO; 2. STATE OF CALIFORNIA; 3. 1542
San Diego County, California	2006–present	1. THE NOBLEST MOTIVE IS THE PUBLIC GOOD; 2. COUNTY OF SAN DIEGO; 3. MDCCCLI [1851]
San Francisco	1940–present	SAN FRANCISCO
San Jose, California		1. CITY OF SAN JOSÉ; 2. CALIFORNIA; 3. FOUNDED 1777
Santa Barbara County, California	–present	1. 1850; 2. SANTA BARBARA COUNTY
Santa Clara County, California	–present	1. SANTA CLARA COUNTY; 2. 1850
Saratoga Springs, New York	–present	1. CITY OF SARATOGA SPRINGS, NEW YORK; 2. HIGH ROCK; 3. Settled 1787 Incorporated 1915
Seattle	1990–present	1. CITY OF GOODWILL; 2. SEATTLE
Seoul, South Korea	1999	SEOUL METROPOLITAN GOVERNMENT
Seychelles	1961–76	SEYCHELLES
Seychelles (Governor)	1961–76	SEYCHELLES
Shanghai International Settlement	c. 1917–43	SHANGHAI MUNICIPALITY
Shangrao	–present	shangrao china
Sierra Leone	1889–1914	S.L. [abbreviation of "Sierra Leone"]
Sierra Leone (Governor-General)	1961–71	SIERRA LEONE
Sierra Leonean presidential standard	1971–present	UNITY FREEDOM JUSTICE
Sierra Leone (royal standard)	1961–71	E [abbreviation of "Elizabeth II"]
Siskiyou County, California	2010–present	1. COUNTY OF SISKIYOU; 2. 18 52; 3. CALIFORNIA
Solomon Islands (Governor-General)	1978–present	SOLOMON ISLANDS
Union of South Africa (Governor-General)	1910–61	UNION OF SOUTH AFRICA
South African Police	1981–1994	SOUTH AFRICAN POLICE
South African Police Service	1995–present	1. SOUTH AFRICAN; 2. POLICE SERVICE
Southampton, New York	–present	1. FIRST ENGLISH SETTLEMENT IN THE STATE OF N.Y.; 2. 1640; 3. TOWN OF SOUTHAMPTON; 4. SEAL
South Carolina	1775–1861	LIBERTY
South Dakota	1992–present	1. SOUTH DAKOTA; 2. THE MOUNT RUSHMORE STATE; 3. STATE OF SOUTH DAKOTA; 4. GREAT SEAL; 5. 1889; 6. UNDER GOD THE PEOPLE RULE
South Dakota	1909–63	1. SOUTH DAKOTA; 2. THE SUNSHINE STATE
South Dakota	1963–92	1. SOUTH DAKOTA; 2. THE SUNSHINE STATE; 3. STATE OF SOUTH DAKOTA; 4. GREAT SEAL; 5. 1889; 6. UNDER GOD THE PEOPLE RULE
South Sinai Governorate	–present	GOVERNORATE OF SOUTH SINAI
South Sudan (President)	2011–present	1. JUSTICE LIBERTY PROSPERITY; 2. REPUBLIC OF SOUTH SUDAN
South Yorkshire	–present	SY [abbreviation of "South Yorkshire"]
Southern Nigeria Protectorate	1900–14	SOUTHERN NIGERIA
Spotsylvania County, Virginia	2001–present	COUNTY OF SPOTSYLVANIA
Spruce Grove	–present	THE CITY OF SPRUCE GROVE
Staten Island	2002–present	STATEN ISLAND
Stockton, California	1999–present	1. STOCKTON FOUNDED JUNE 1849; 2. INCORPORATED JULY 1850
Summerside, Prince Edward Island	1995–present	1. CITY of SUMMERSIDE; 2. INC. 1995; 3. PRINCE EDWARD ISLAND
Suzhou	–present	SUZHOU

== T ==
Flag	Dates used	English text
Tainan City	2010–present	TAINAN
Taipei	2010–present	TAIPEI
Taita-Taveta County	–present	T T [abbreviation of "Taita Taveta"]
Talbot County, Maryland	1963–present	Talbot
Tampa, Florida	1930–present	1. CITY OF TAMPA, FLORIDA; 2. MASCOTTE; 3. ORGANIZED JULY 15, 1887
Tanganyika (Governor-General)	1961–62	TANGANYIKA
Taunton, Massachusetts	–present	1. LIBERTY AND UNION
Tennessee	1897–1905	1. THE VOLUNTEER STATE; 2. 16
Transportation Security Administration	2018–present	TRANSPORTATION SECURITY ADMINISTRATION
Trenton, New Jersey	–present	1. SEAL OF THE CITY OF TRENTON; 2. 1792
Trinidad and Tobago (Governor-General)	1962–76	TRINIDAD AND TOBAGO
Trinidad and Tobago (President)	1976–present	TOGETHER WE ASPIRE TOGETHER WE ACHIEVE
Trinidad and Tobago (Prime Minister)	1962–present	TOGETHER WE ASPIRE TOGETHER WE ACHIEVE
Trinidad and Tobago (royal standard)	1966–76	E [abbreviation of "Elizabeth II"]
Tristan da Cunha	2002–present	OUR FAITH IS OUR STRENGTH
Tristan da Cunha (Administrator)	2002–present	OUR FAITH IS OUR STRENGTH
Tuolumne County, California	2007–present	1. TUOLUMNE; 2. COUNTY
Tuvalu (Governor-General)	1978–present	TUVALU

== U ==
Flag	Dates used	English text
U.S. Immigration and Customs Enforcement	2013–present	1. U.S. IMMIGRATION AND CUSTOMS; 2. ENFORCEMENT
Uganda (Governor-General)	1962–63	UGANDA
Uganda (President)	1963–present	FOR GOD AND MY COUNTRY
Union County, Ohio	–present	1. UNION COUNTY; 2. EST. 1820
United States Air Force	1951–present	UNITED STATES AIR FORCE
United States Army	1956–present	1. UNITED STATES ARMY; 2. 1775
United States Border Patrol	2000–present	1. U.S.; [abbreviation of "United States"]: 2. BORDER PATROL
United States Coast Guard	1964–present	1. UNITED STATES COAST GUARD; 2. 1790
United States Coast Guard Auxiliary	2000–present	1. U.S. COAST GUARD; 2. AUXILIARY
United States Department of Agriculture	1997–present	1. UNITED STATES DEPARTMENT OF AGRICULTURE; 2. 1862; 3. 1889; 4. AGRICULTURE IS THE FOUNDATION OF MANUFACTURE AND COMMERCE
United States Department of Commerce	2002–present	1. DEPARTMENT OF COMMERCE; 2. UNITED STATES OF AMERICA
United States Department of Education	1980–present	1. DEPARTMENT OF EDUCATION; 2. UNITED STATES OF AMERICA
United States Department of Health and Human Services	1980–present	1. DEPARTMENT OF HEALTH AND HUMAN SERVICES; 2. USA; [abbreviation of "United States of America"]
United States Department of Homeland Security	2003–present	1. U.S. DEPARTMENT OF; 2. HOMELAND SECURITY
United States Department of the Interior	1990–present	1. U.S. DEPARTMENT OF THE INTERIOR; 2. MARCH 3, 1849
United States Department of Justice	1992–present	DEPARTMENT OF JUSTICE
United States Department of State	2013–present	1. UNITED STATES OF AMERICA; 2. DEPARTMENT OF STATE
United States Department of Transportation	1967–80	1. DEPARTMENT OF TRANSPORTATION; 2. UNITED STATES OF AMERICA
United States Department of Transportation	1999–present	1. DEPARTMENT OF TRANSPORTATION; 2. UNITED STATES OF AMERICA
United States Department of the Treasury	1963–present	1. THE DEPARTMENT OF THE TREASURY; 2. 1789
United States Marine Corps	1939–present	UNITED STATES MARINE CORPS
United States Marshals Service	2011–present	1. DEPARTMENT OF JUSTICE; 2. 1789; 3. JUSTICE INTEGRITY SERVICE; 4. UNITED STATES MARSHAL
United States Navy	1959–present	UNITED STATES NAVY
United States Public Health Service	1978–present	1. U.S. PUBLIC HEALTH SERVICE; 2. 1798
United States Secret Service	2002–present	1. SECRET SERVICE; 2. US; [abbreviation of "United States"]
United States Virgin Islands	1921–present	V I [abbreviation of "Virgin Islands"]
Utah	1903–2024	1. INDUSTRY; 2. UTAH; 3. 1847; 4. 1896

== V ==
Flag	Dates used	English text
Venda	1973–94	V [abbreviation of "Venda"]
Vermont	1923–present	1. VERMONT; 2. FREEDOM AND UNITY
Vermont	1804–1837	VERMONT
Vernon, Canada	2010–present	V [abbreviation of "Vernon"]
Victoria, Gozo	–present	V [abbreviation of "Victoria"]
Virginia	1861–present	VIRGINIA

== W ==
Flag	Dates used	English text
Washington	1923–present	1. THE SEAL OF THE STATE OF WASHINGTON; 2. 1889
Washington County, Alabama	2006–present	1. WASHINGTON; 2. THE FIRST COUNTY IN ALABAMA
Washington County, Pennsylvania	–present	1. Historical Washington County; 2. 1781
Wayne County, Michigan	1958–present	1. SEAL OF THE CHARTER COUNTY OF WAYNE, MICHIGAN 1796; 2. WE PRODUCE WE DEFEND FREEDOM OF MAN; 3. IN GOD WE TRUST
Wayne County, Ohio	1987–present	1. WAYNE COUNTY; 2. 1812
West Indies Federation (Governor-General)	1958–62	THE WEST INDIES
Westmoreland County, Pennsylvania	–present	1. I.B.W.C.P.; [abbreviation of "Independent Battalion of Westmoreland County, Pennsylvania"]: 2. DONT TREAD ON ME
West Virginia	1929–present	1. STATE OF WEST VIRGINIA; 2. JUNE 20 1863
Weyburn	–present	VISION ACHIEVEMENT PROGRESS
Whitehorse, Yukon	2008–present	1. THE CITY OF WHITEHORSE; 2. 19 50
Whittier, California	2012–present	WHITTIER, CALIFORNIA
Wilmington, Delaware	–present	1. SEAL OF THE CITY OF WILMINGTON; 2. DELAWARE
Windsor, Canada	1992–present	1. CITY OF WINDSOR; 2. 1854
Winnipeg	1975–present	CITY OF WINNIPEG
Wisconsin	1979–present	1. WISCONSIN; 2. FORWARD; 3. 1848
Worcester, Massachusetts	–present	1. WORCESTER; 2. A TOWN JUNE 14, 1722; 3. A CITY FEBY 29, 1848
Wrangell, Alaska	1972–present	1. WRANGELL; 2. GATEWAY TO THE STIKINE; 3. ADOPTED AUGUST 1972
Wyoming	1917–present	1. GREAT SEAL OF THE STATE OF WYOMING; 2. EQUAL RIGHTS; 3. LIVESTOCK; 4. GRAIN; 5. MINES; 6. OIL; 7. 1869; 8. 1890

== X ==
Flag	Dates used	English text
XVIII Airborne Corps	1950–present	AIRBORNE

== Y ==
Flag	Dates used	English text
Yarmouth, Canada	–present	1. The MUNICIPALITY of YARMOUTH; 2. FOUNDED 1879
Yolo County, California	2001–2014	1. YOLO COUNTY; 2. 1850
Yonkers, New York	–present	CORPORATION OF THE CITY OF YONKERS

== Z ==
Flag	Dates used	English text
Zambia (President)	–present	ONE ZAMBIA ONE NATION
Zimbabwe (President)	1987–present	UNITY FREEDOM WORK

== See also ==
- List of inscribed flags
