= Flag of Malta =

Republic of Malta
- Use: National flag and state and naval ensign
- Proportion: 2:3
- Adopted: 21 September 1964; 62 years ago
- Design: A vertical bicolour of white and red with the representation of the George Cross edged in red on the upper hoist-side corner of the white band.
- Use: Civil flag and ensign
- Design: A red field with a white border, and a white Maltese cross in the center.

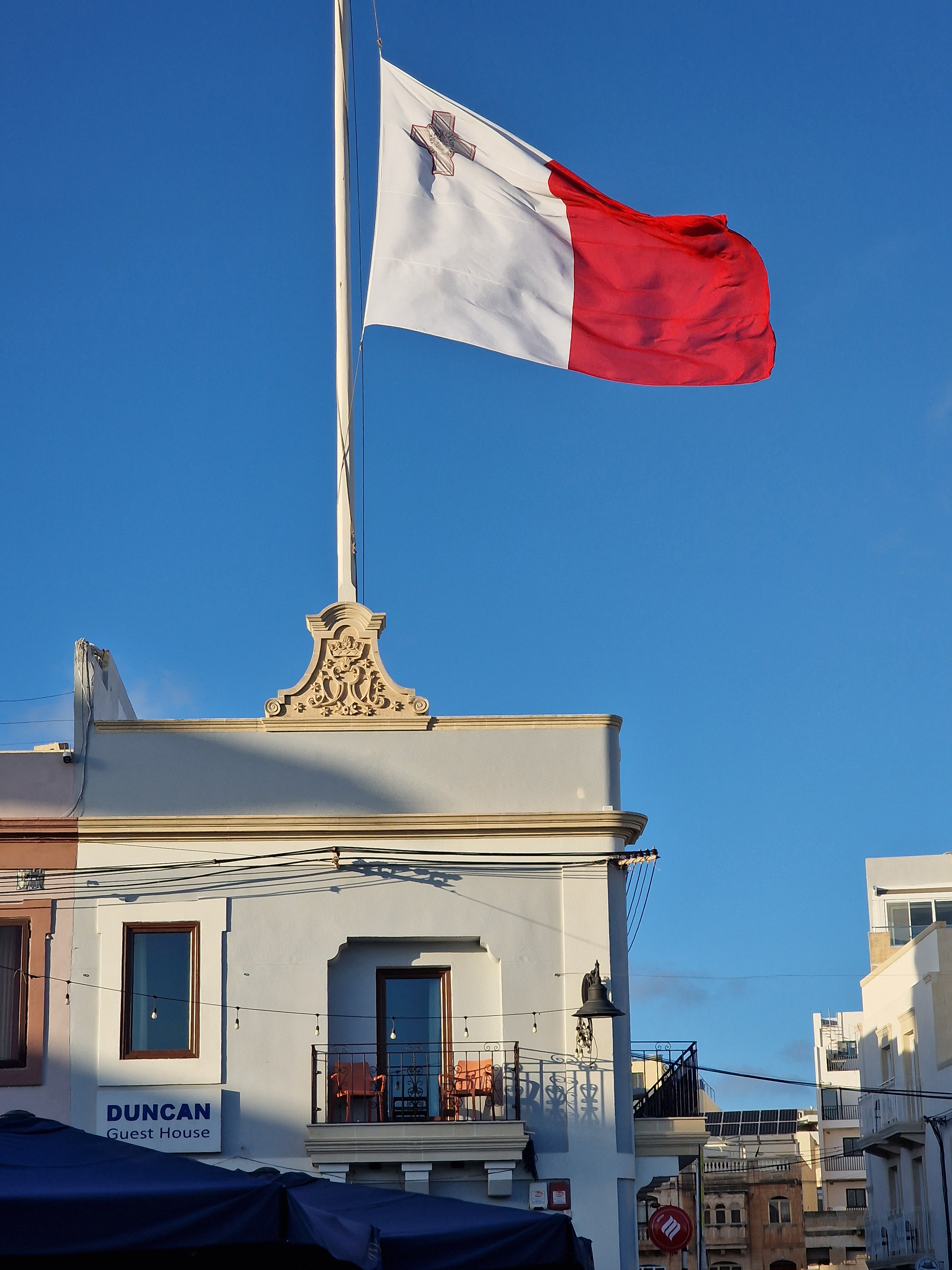
National flag of Malta in Marsaxlokk

The flag of Malta (il-bandiera ta' Malta) is a bicolour, with white in the hoist and red in the fly. A representation of the George Cross, awarded to Malta by George VI in 1942, is carried, edged with red, in the canton of the white stripe. The flag was first recognized in May of 1952. It is the only national flag to feature English-language text ("For Gallantry" on the George Cross). It is one of two national flags, alongside Belize, to depict a human.

== Design ==
=== Colours ===
The red hue in the Maltese flag is officially documented as Pantone 186 C, RGB (207,20,43), Hex #CF142B or Spot Colour - 50% rubine red • 50% warm red.

The constitution of Malta also states that the white side must be on the hoist pole while the red side must be "in the fly".

Tradition states that the colours of the flag were given to Malta by Roger I of Sicily in 1091. Roger's fleet landed in Malta on the completion of the Norman conquest of Sicily. It is said that local Christians offered to fight by Roger's side against the Arab defenders. In order to recognize the locals fighting on his side from the defenders, Roger reportedly tore off part of his chequered red-and-white flag. However, this story has been debunked as a 19th-century myth, possibly even earlier due to Mdina, Malta's old capital, associating its colours with Roger's in the late Middle Ages.

The white and red standard was reportedly used by Maltese insurgents during a rebellion against French occupation in September 1798.

The flag of the Knights of Malta, a white cross on a red field, was a more likely source of the Maltese colours, inspiring the red and white shield used during the British colonial period. The flag used by the knights was also known to be the oldest still-in-use national flag. The blue canton present in the 1943 to 1964 version of the flag was removed after Maltese independence, with the George cross instead given a red fimbriation.

== The George Cross ==
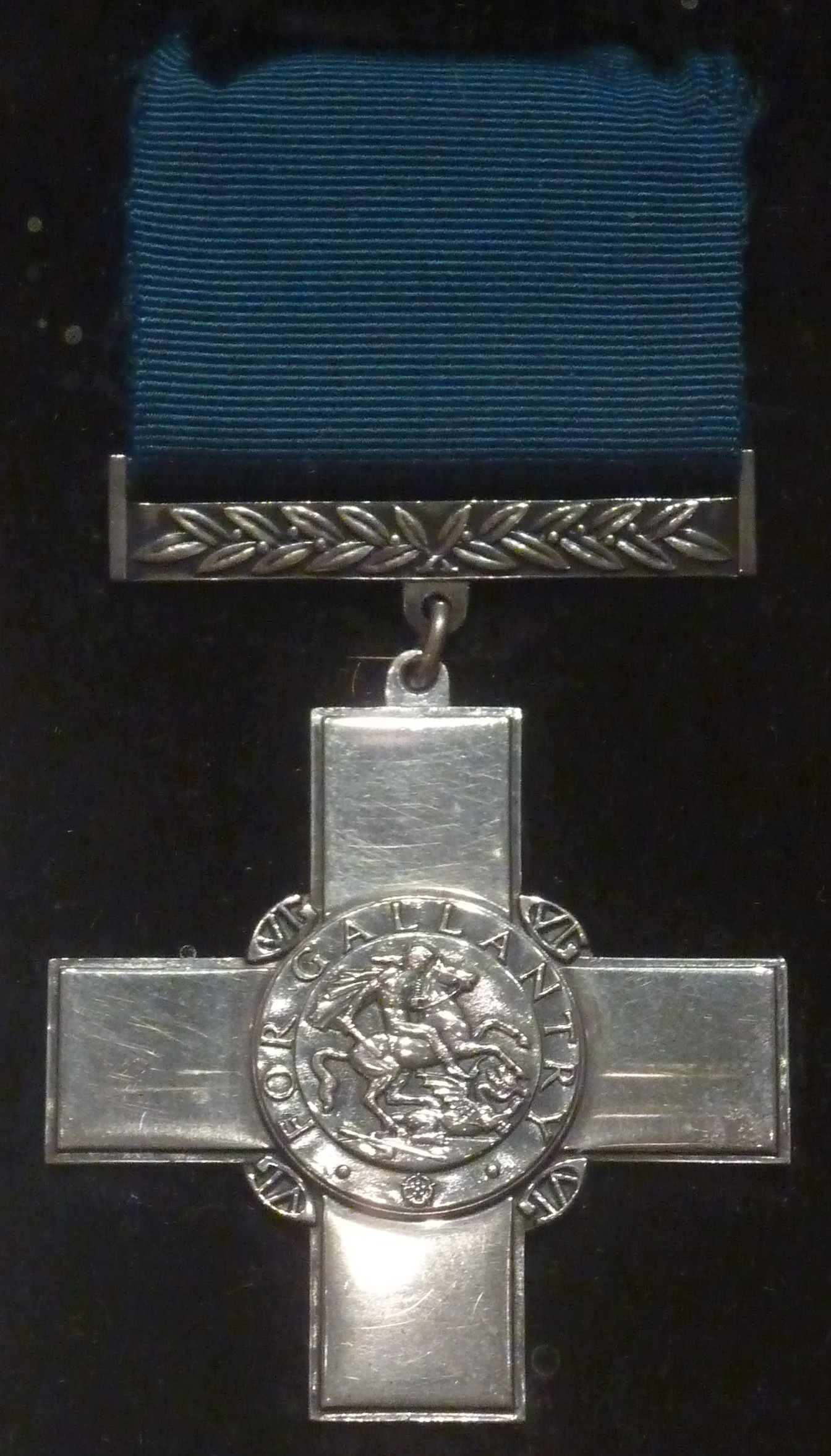
The George Cross (National War Museum, Malta)

The George Cross originally appeared on the flag placed on a blue canton (see List of flags of Malta). The flag was changed on 21 September 1964 with Malta's independence when the blue canton was replaced by a red fimbriation, the intention being that the Cross appear less prominent. King George VI bestowed the George Cross on Malta on April 15, 1942 in recognition of its courageousness during World War II. The symbol was later officially added to the Maltese flag on 28 December 1943 despite symbolism being in circulation between April 1942 and December 1943 depicting the flag.

=== Campaign ===
Every few years, the debate to remove the George Cross from the national flag comes up. In 1975 an act passed in parliament allowing the George Cross to be removed by a simple parliament majority with the reasoning being that the cross ties Malta to its turbulent, colonial past. A campaign on social media in 2013 further emphasized this point, coming up with an alternative of replacing it with the Maltese cross.

The issue of the cross returned to the fore of Maltese politics in 2019 when Maltese historian and noted Francophile Charles Xuereb called for its removal from the flag, as well as the demolition of British colonial monuments across the country, arguing that the addition of the cross was a "colonial gimmick" in an interview with The Times of Malta.

Rival historian Joe Pirotta argued against Xuereb's idea in an article also published by The Times of Malta saying that the addition of the cross was a great honor with Mario Farrugia, chairman of the Fondazzjoni Wirt Artna, arguing that removing the cross would be "an insult" to those who fought against Nazism and that "The George Cross has become as famous as the Maltese Cross" as a symbol of Malta.

== Civil ensign ==
The civil ensign shows a red field, bordered white and charged with a blank Maltese cross. It is also known as the Merchant's flag and/or the maritime flag of Malta.

== Historical flags of Malta ==
19th century, Crown Colony of Malta

1875–1898, Crown Colony of Malta

1898–1923, Crown Colony of Malta

1923–1943, Crown Colony of Malta

1943–1964, Crown Colony of Malta

1943–1964, Unofficial flag of Malta

== Timeline ==
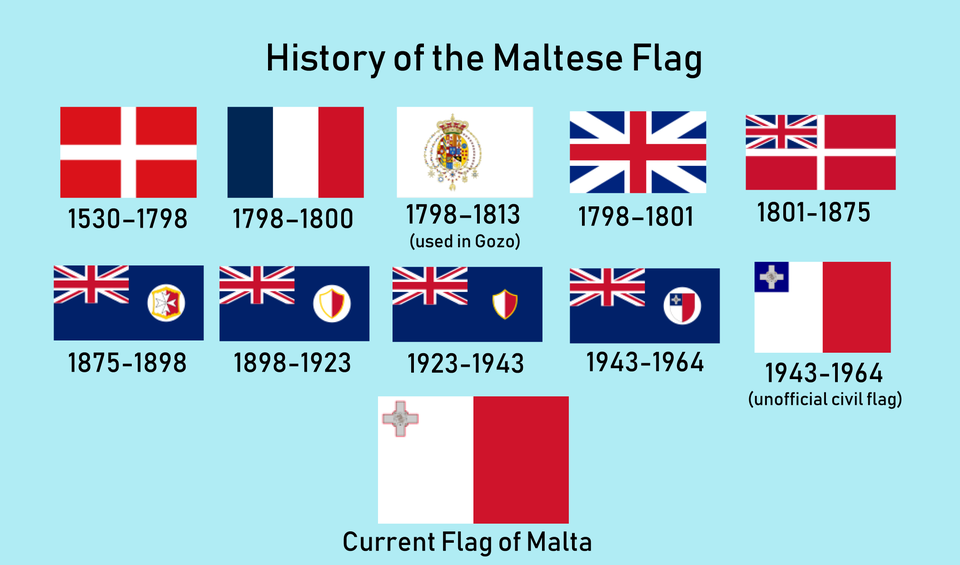

== See also ==
- List of flags of Malta
- Award of the George Cross to Malta
- Coat of arms of Malta
- Culture of Malta
- National symbols of Malta
