= Award of the George Cross to Malta =

1942 award by King George VI to the people of Malta

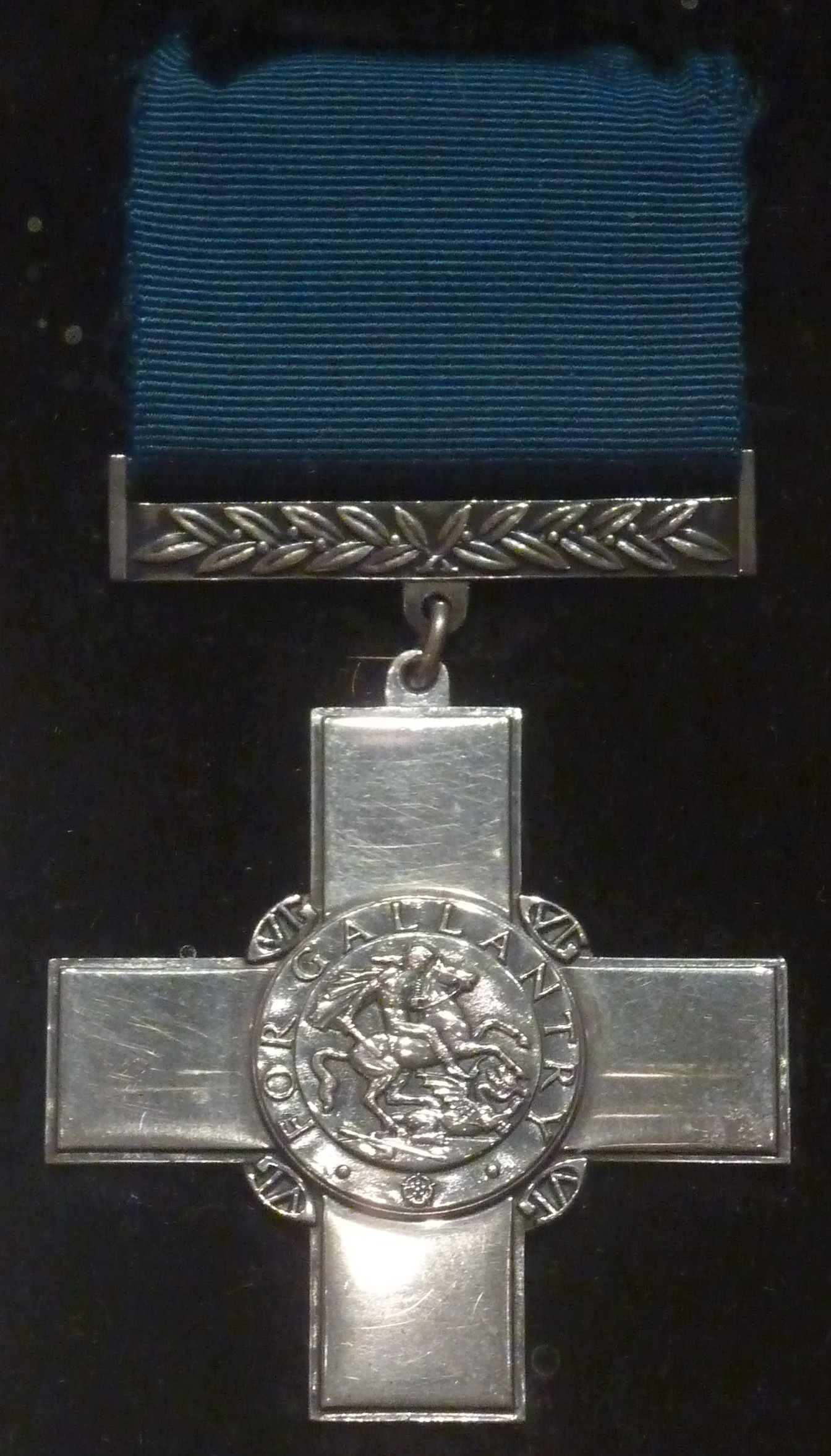
The George Cross (National War Museum, Malta)

The island of Malta was a British colony from 1813 to 1964 and the George Cross was awarded to the island in April 1942 by King George VI. The cross was awarded in recognition of Maltese resilience during the Siege of Malta by Italy and Germany in the early part of World War II. The George Cross was incorporated into the flag of Malta beginning in 1943 and remains on the current design of the flag.

== Historical background ==
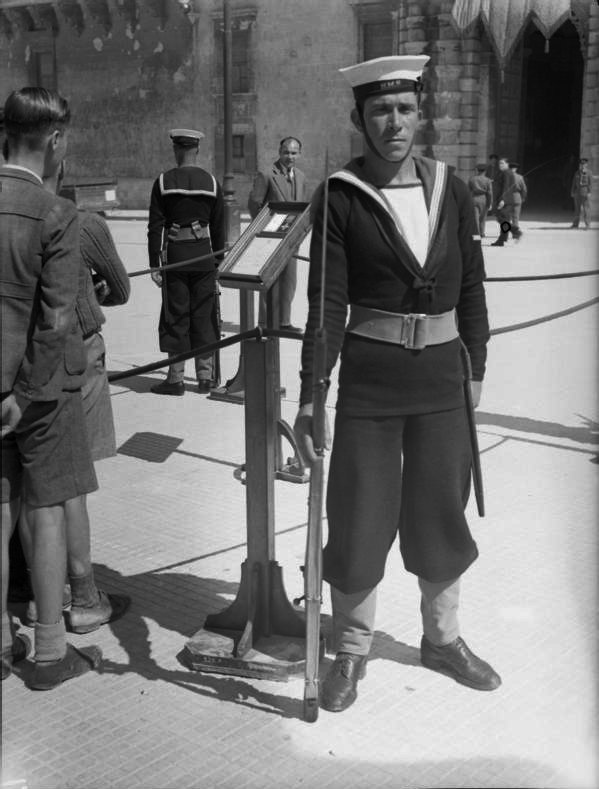
Maltese ratings of the Royal Navy mounting guard over the George Cross as it is ceremoniously displayed in Palace Square, Valletta, on the first anniversary of the award

Italian and German bombers attacked the Maltese islands and there was a lack of supplies. An invasion threat in July 1941 failed when coast defenders spotted torpedo boats of the Italian Decima MAS special forces. Whilst people suffered hunger, a final assault to neutralise the island was ordered by the German Field Marshal Albert Kesselring. However, the assault failed. On 15 April 1942, King George VI awarded the George Cross to the people of Malta in appreciation of their heroism.

The George Cross was awarded during the worst period for the Allies during the Second World War, as the Axis-forces had the upper hand. German planes struck the island round the clock, in an attempt to neutralise British bases, which interfered with naval attempts to supply Rommel's North African campaign. Malta's geographic position, between Italy and North Africa, dividing the Mediterranean basin into east and west put the islands in danger. Malta-based British aircraft could reach a range as far as Tripoli in Libya to the south, Tunisia to the west and German bases in Italy to the north; on Pantelleria, Sicily, and as far as the port of Naples farther to the north.

At the time of the George Cross award, military resources and food rations in Malta were practically depleted. Fuel was restricted to military action and heavily rationed, the population was on the brink of starvation, and even ammunition was running out, such that Anti-Aircraft (AA) guns could only fire a few rounds per day.

Italian battleships of the Regia Marina out-gunned the British, yet the Royal Navy was not out-classed. The German air force had superior aircraft until Spitfires were sent to Malta in 1942. Also at this time, German and Italian plans for Operation Herkules, a sea and air invasion of the Maltese Islands, had to be repeatedly postponed – until it was too late because the Maltese Islands finally received a vital supply of fuel, food, and munitions.

On 15 August 1942 (the feast day of Santa Marija also known as Assumption of Mary Day) a convoy of Royal and Merchant Navy ships finally made port in Convoy of Santa Maria at Valletta's Grand Harbour, after completing what has been considered one of the most heroic maritime episodes in recent history.

== The George Cross award ==
The George Cross was instituted by King George VI, on 24 September 1940, replacing the Empire Gallantry Medal. It is the civilian equivalent to the Victoria Cross. While intended mainly for civilians, it is awarded also to certain fighting services, confined however to actions for which purely military honours are not normally given. This medal is awarded only for acts of the greatest heroism or the most conspicuous courage in circumstances of extreme danger.

=== Awarded to Malta ===
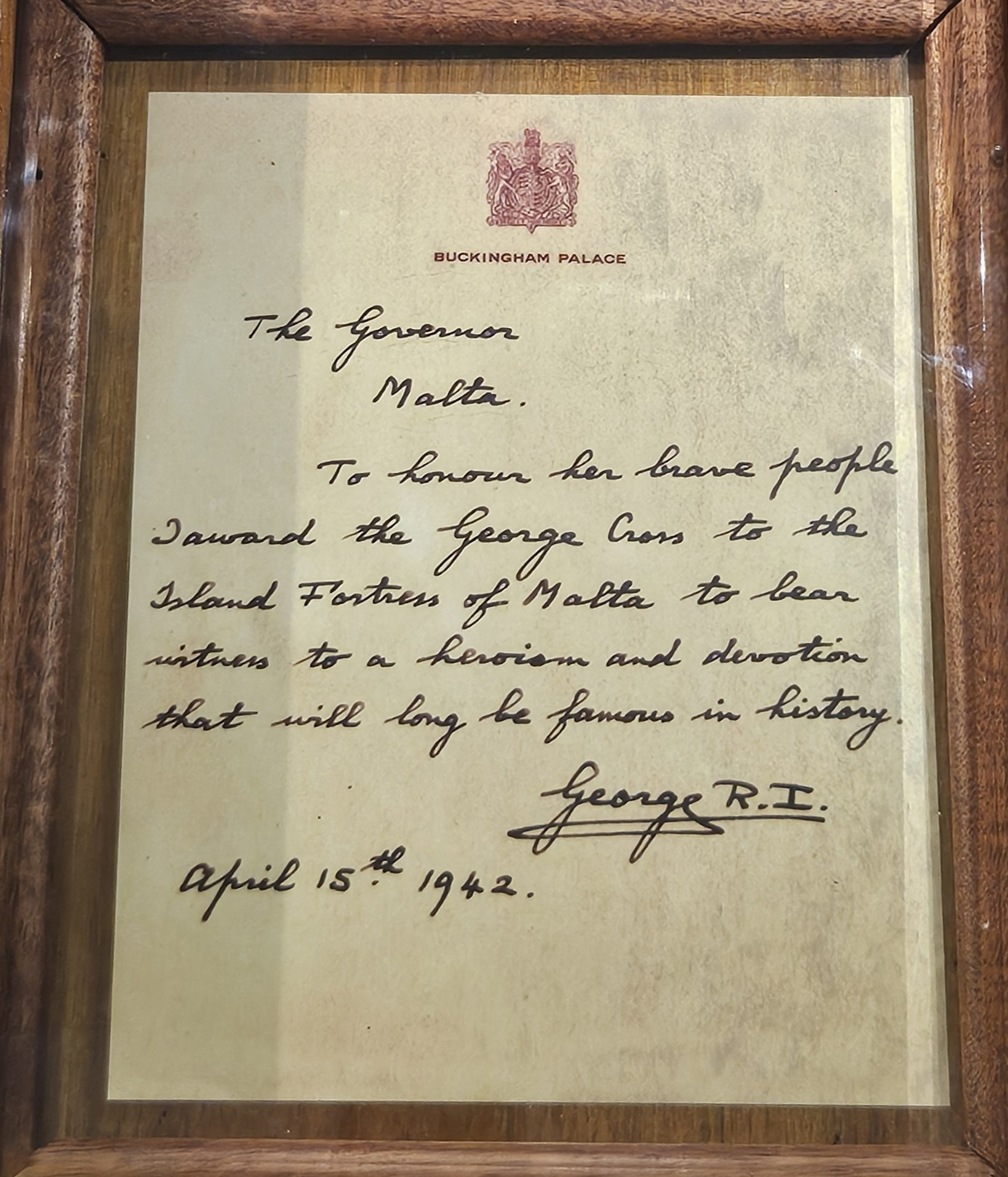
The original letter from George VI awarding the George Cross to Malta, on display in Fort Saint Elmo.

One of only three collective awards of the George Cross was the award to Malta. This award was made by King George VI in a handwritten letter:

The Governor
Malta
To honour her brave people I award the George Cross to the Island Fortress of Malta to bear witness to a heroism and devotion that will long be famous in history.
George R.I.
April 15th 1942

Lieutenant-General Sir William Dobbie answered:

By God's help, Malta will not weaken but will endure until victory is won.

A public award ceremony in Valletta was held on 13 September 1942, after the arrival of the Santa Maria Convoy.

The war propaganda short film Malta G.C. was commissioned in 1942 by the British government to popularise the endurance of the Maltese people and the awarding of the George Cross. It features real footage of the bombings and their effects.

== Today ==
The Flag of Malta displays the George Cross in the upper corner of the hoist.

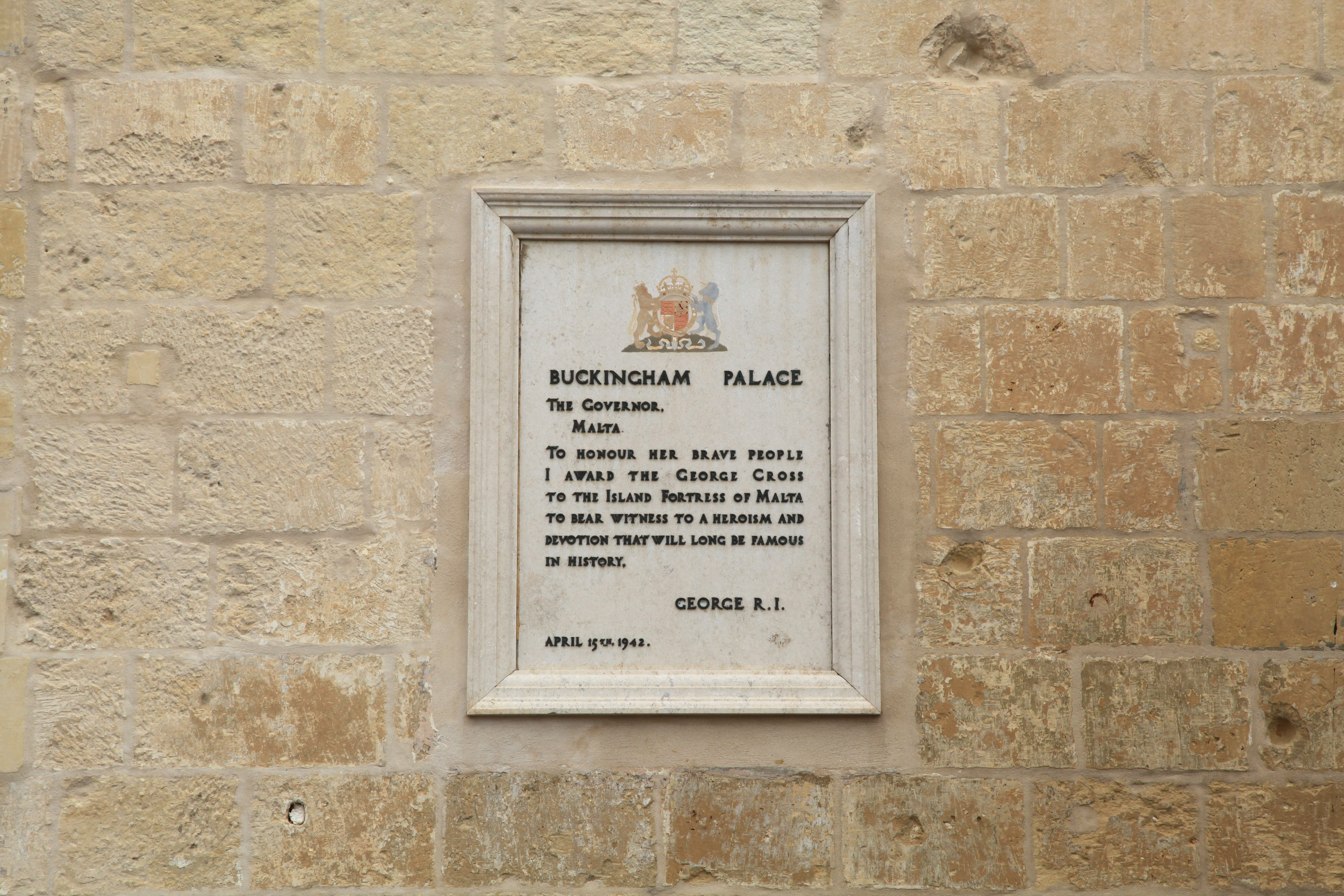
Plaque on the Grandmaster's Palace in Valletta inscribed with George VI's letter.

The Cross and the King's message are today found in the National War Museum in Fort Saint Elmo, Valletta.

Harrods department store flew the Maltese flag to mark Malta's 70th anniversary as a George Cross Island from the 1 to 28 March 2012.
