= Seal of Seattle =

Seal of the City of Seattle
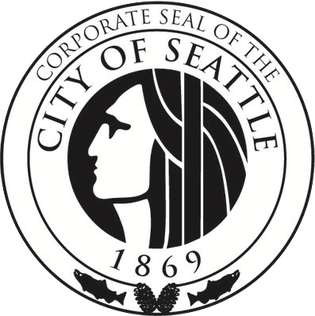
- Armiger: Katie Wilson, Mayor of Seattle
- Adopted: 1974
- Supporter: None
- Use: City flag, official correspondence, insignia of city agencies and institutions

The Seal of the City of Seattle consists of an artist's profile portrait of Chief Seattle under which appears the Arabic numerals 1869, the year of Seattle's incorporation in the Common Era. It is surrounded by two circles. The words Corporate Seal Of The are at the top within the outer circle, and the words City of Seattle are at the top within the inner circle.

The original seal was designed by James A. Wehn and cast by Richard Fuller and was adopted by the Seattle City Council in 1937. Previous to its adoption in 1937, the city had used a notary type seal.

Over time the seal has gone through many updates and re-design efforts. The original seal was re-designed and replaced in 1974 with a more simplified design as part of Seattle's larger branding effort. The seal was again re-designed in the 1980s and then in the 1990s to match the adoption of the Seattle City logo. The current official design features two cones from an evergreen tree and what appear to be two salmon beneath the portrait. The Corporate Seal of the City of Seattle is distinct from the official Seattle City Logo. Elements of the seal are featured in the insignia of many City workers, including the Seattle Fire Department and Seattle Police Department.

== See also ==
- Flag of Seattle
