= List of flags of Malta =

The following is a list of flags of Malta.

== National flags ==
Flag	Date	Use	Description
	1964–present	National flag, state and naval ensign	A vertical bicolour of white and red, augmented in the canton by a depiction of the British George Cross. Ratio 2:3.
	1964–present	Civil ensign	Red, bordered white and charged with a white Maltese cross. Ratio 2:3.
	1964–present	Banner of arms of Gozo, second-largest island in the Republic of Malta	Symbolizes the islands nickname, 'The Island of the Three Hills', and also the fact that it is surrounded by sea.

== Governmental flags ==
Flag	Date	Use	Description
	1814–present	Commissioner of the Police Force	Blue, with a silver representation of the Malta Police badge in the centre.
	1988–present	Presidential standard	Blue, with the arms of Malta in the centre and a golden Maltese cross in each corner. Ratio: 2:3. Previously used the national flag.

== Military flags ==
Flag	Date	Use	Description
	1988–present	National colour	Identical to the state flag. White and red, augmented in the canton by a depiction of the British George Cross. On the colour boundary there is a golden De Redin tower placed at the middle, and a golden scroll with the words FORZI ARMATI at the bottom.
	1988–present	Military colour	Red at the top and blue at the bottom, bearing at the centre the badge of the Royal Malta Artillery (minus Royal Crown), which is the main predecessor of the modern-day Armed Forces of Malta; the motto TUTELA BELLICÆ VIRTUTIS (Custodians of Military Prowess). The four corners bear the seven-flamed grenade above the scroll reading MALTA, tilted 45 degrees. On the top of the badge there are two battle honours on scrolls, MDCCC (for the Siege of Valletta in 1800), EGYPT 1882. Below the badge there is another battle honour MALTA 1942.
	1964–present	Military ensign	Identical to the state flag. White and red, augmented in the canton by a depiction of the British George Cross. Ratio 2:3.
	1964–present	Naval jack	A George Cross proper fimbriated in red in the centre of a white square, within a red square. Each corner of the red square shall contain a white Maltese Cross. Ratio: 1:1.
	c.1973–present	Commander of the Armed Forces' pennant	A red triangular pennant with golden emblem of the Armed Forces. The emblem is a mason tower of de Redin, which represents fortification and Malta defences back to the time of the knights of St. John.

== Historical flags ==
Flag	Date	Use	Description
	831–1091	Flag of the Emirate of Sicily used in Malta	A simple green field.
	1194–1266	Banner of Manfred, King of Sicily used in Malta	A white swallowtail flag with a black eagle in the center.
	1266–1282	Flag of the Kingdom of Sicily under the Capetian House of Anjou used in Malta	A blue field with several fleur-de-lis and a red label.
	1282–1296	First flag of the Kingdom of Sicily under the Crown of Aragon used in Malta	The Aragonese Señera in the first and fourth quarters and the Eagle of Sicily in the second and third quarters.
	1296–1410	Second flag of the Kingdom of Sicily under the Crown of Aragon used in Malta	Similar to the Aragonese Señera, but with two white triangles with an eagle inside of both triangles.
	1410–1516	Third flag of the Kingdom of Sicily under the Crown of Aragon used in Malta	An inverted version of the previous flag.
	1516–1530	Flag of Habsburg Spain used in Malta	A red saltire resembling two crossed, roughly-pruned (knotted) branches, on a white field.
	1530–1798	Flag of the Order of Saint John used in Malta	Red rectangular flag quartered by a white cross.
	1798–1800	Flag of France used in Malta	A vertical tricolour of blue, white, and red.
	1800–1801	Flag of Great Britain used in Malta	A superimposition of the flags of England and Scotland.
	1801–1813	Flag of the United Kingdom used in Malta	A superimposition of the flags of England and Scotland with the Saint Patrick's saltire (representing Ireland).
	1813–1875	British Malta state ensign	Red Ensign with a white St George's cross, but no badge.
	1875–1898	British Malta state ensign	Blue Ensign. Badge: A white Maltese cross on white and red panel framed with ginger-bread.
	1898–1923	British Malta state ensign	Blue Ensign. Badge: On a white circle a white and red shield with pointed top and gold border.
	1923–1943	British Malta state ensign	Blue Ensign. Badge: White and red shield with pointed top and gold border.
	1943–1964	British Malta state ensign	Blue Ensign. Badge: On a white circle a white and red flat top shield with George Cross on blue canton.
	Before 1943	Malta civil flag (unofficial)	Undefaced white-red vertical bicolor. Ratio 2:3.
	1943–1964	Malta civil flag (unofficial)	White-red vertical bicolor with George Cross on blue canton.
	1967–1974	Queen Elizabeth II's personal flag for Malta	One of Queen Elizabeth II's personal flags. This flag was used when she was Queen of Malta until it was made redundant by the introduction of a republican form of government in 1974. It featured the arms of Malta in banner form defaced with the device from her personal flag: a blue roundel with a crowned "E" surrounded by a wreath of gold roses. Ratio 2:3.
	1875–c. 1898	Governor's flag	Badge: A white Maltese cross on white and red panel framed with ginger-bread, on a white circle surrounded by a garland on the Union Flag.
	c.1898–1943	Governor's flag	Badge: White and red shield with pointed top and gold border, on a white circle surrounded by a garland on the Union Flag.
	1943–1964	Governor's flag	Badge: White and red shield with pointed top and George Cross on blue canton, on a white circle surrounded by a garland on the Union Flag of the Governor.
	1964–1974	Governor-General's flag	Commonwealth blue with the royal crest and Malta scroll.

== Local councils ==
Some flags had been used prior to the creation of local councils in 1993. The coats of arms of the local councils are officially recognised, however the flags are not and thus a number of variants exist. Since 1993, a new local council, Mtarfa, has been created, and the local councils of Attard, Birżebbuġa, Floriana, Kalkara, Lija, Mellieħa, Mġarr, Mosta, Nadur, Naxxar, Paola, Qrendi, Siġġiewi, Xgħajra and Żebbuġ have changed their flags and coats of arms. Some, such as Mosta, had minor differences, but others, like Xgħajra changed the arms completely.

=== Malta ===
Flag	Date	Use	Description
	2000–present	Attard (village)	A blue cross that represents Roman Catholicism and St. Mary with a red square in the middle on white background.
	1993–present	Balzan (village)	A red horizontal band between two thin horizontal green lines, on white background.
	1993–present	Birgu – Città Vittoriosa (city)	Sword held upright and laurel are symbolizing the winner, olive probably the peace afterwards. A number of variants of the flag are known to exist.
	1993–present	Birkirkara (town)	Horizontally divided red over white, the red stripe about half as wide as the white one. A St. Edward's crown centred on the red stripe, a red Greek cross centred on the white stripe.
	1993–2000	Birżebbuġa (village)	Dark blue with a yellow chain in orle and two yellow crossed keys in the centre.
	2000–present	Birżebbuġa (village)	An olive plant representing this locality, and the colour blue because it is near the sea.
	1993–present	Bormla – Città Cospicua (city)	A cotton plant on a yellow background.
	1993–present	Dingli (village)	Segmented diagonally in four triangles: two light blue facing each other horizontally and two red ones facing each other vertically, all separated with a white band.
	1993–present	Fgura (town)	A white flag with a red horizontal line, and three gold stars on the line. Similar to the flag of Kerċem.
	1993–2006	Floriana (town)	Divided per pale. The dexter side shows a red rampant lion with a golden head in a white field. The sinister side shows a golden winged arm holding upright a sword in natural colour. It was based on the coat of arms of Grandmaster António Manoel de Vilhena. A variant of this flag also existed.
	2006–present	Floriana (town)	Red rampant lion on a white background, taken from the coat of arms of Grandmaster António Manoel de Vilhena.
	1993–present	Gudja (village)	White flag with a red pointed bar.
	1993–present	Gżira (town)	A blue flag with a white wavy stripe from the top hoist to the bottom fly; on the top fly, a yellow heraldic ship, on the bottom hoist a yellow heraldic dolphin with a red tongue.
	1993–present	Għargħur (village)	A white flag with a red triangle from the bottom and a red star on top.
	1993–present	Għaxaq (village)	White flag defaced by three green bars.
	1993–present	Ħamrun (town)	Red flag with a white border. A variant flag is known to exist.
	1993–present	Iklin (village)	Blue flag with Saint Michael holding a flaming sword and a shield with a green cross. Similar to the Flag of Kyiv.
	1993–present	Isla – Città Invicta (city)	A yellow flag with a black saltire, on its ends and centre five white pilgrim's scallops.
	1993–2009	Kalkara (village)	A yellow and blue flag with a flame on the blue field.
	2009–present	Kalkara (village)	Yellow and blue flag with a flame erupting from the line joining the two fields, with a green border.
	1993–present	Kirkop (village)	White flag with a red band in the centre, connected to the bottom with another red band forming a shape similar to that of a T.
	1993–2000	Lija (village)	An orange tree rising from a green mound on a white field.
	2000–present	Lija (village)	Orange branch with three oranges, with a red square on the left and a red one on the right. Current flag adopted in 2000.
	1993–present	Luqa (village)	White flag with a red saltire. Similar to the Saint Patrick's Saltire and the flag of Marsaxlokk.
	1993–present	Marsa (town)	A flag split vertically. On the hoist side, six horizontal alternating stripes of white and blue. On the fly side, six horizontal alternating stripes of red and white. Superimposed in the center is a sailing ship.
	1993–present	Marsaskala (village)	Green flag divided by a downward pointing wedge. The wedge is white with three blue wavy fessy lines.
	1993–present	Marsaxlokk (village)	White flag with a blue saltire. A variant flag is known to exist. Similar the flag of Luqa.
	1993–2000	Mellieħa (village)	A blue field with a white stripe from upper hoist to lower fly and a white five-pointed star in the upper fly.
	2000–present	Mellieħa (village)	Blue flag with a white six-pointed star and a golden chevron.
	1993–present	Mdina (city)	Undefaced white-red vertical bicolor. This was the unofficial flag of Malta until 1943. A variant flag is known to exist.
	1993–2000	Mġarr (village)	A blue field with a yellow cartwheel.
	2000–present	Mġarr (village)	A trilithon, symbol of Skorba Temples, on wavy blue and white lines.
	1993–c.2007	Mosta (town)	A white flag with a red cross. In the centre of the cross is a blue star within a gold circle.
	c.2007–present	Mosta (town)	A white flag representing the actual town of Mosta with a red cross representing the Catholic faith among the people of Mosta. The yellow circle in the middle represents the Rotunda, which is one of the most recognised landmarks in Malta, within the circle is a white star on a blue background representing St. Mary, who is the patron saint of Mosta. Current flag adopted 2006 or 2007.
	1993–present	Mqabba (village)	Red flag with a white stripe from upper hoist to lower fly.
	1993–present	Msida (town)	Green flag with two white stripes from upper hoist to lower fly.
	2000–present	Mtarfa (village)	Flag possibly representing the Mtarfa barracks.
	1993–c.2000	Naxxar (town)	White-red horizontal bicolour, with a counterchanged cross in the middle.
	c.2000–present	Naxxar (town)	White-red vertical bicolour, with a counterchanged cross in the middle. Similar to the flags of Sliema and Żurrieq.
	1994–1996	Paola (village)	A golden spiral on a red background.
Link to file	1996–present	Paola (village)	Three spirals on the top part representing the Hal Saflieni Hypogeum. The three peacocks in the lower part are derived from the arms of the original founder of the town Grand Master Antoine de Paule.
	1993–present	Pembroke (village)	Fourteen castles representing the coastal watchtowers erected by Grand Master Martin De Redin. The swords represent the fact that Pembroke was built on former British barracks.
	1993–present	Pietà (village)	A pelican sitting in a nest with several chicks, feeding them by letting some blood from her chest, thus vulning herself.
	1993–present	Qormi – Città Pinto (city)	A white flag with the five crescents of Manuel Pinto de Fonseca.
	1993–2000	Qrendi (village)	White star on a blue flag.
	2000–present	Qrendi (village)	White star on a blue flag with a yellow border.
	1993–present	Rabat (town)	Flag of Mdina defaced by an olive branch.
	1993–present	Safi (village)	White flag defaced by a single blue bar.
	1993–present	San Ġiljan – Portus Sancti Juliani (village)	Seven vertical stripes of white and red.
	1993–present	San Ġwann (town)	The paschal lamb, a usual attribute of St John the Baptist on a red background.
	1993–present	San Pawl il-Baħar (town)	The wavy lines are symbolizing the bay. Snake and sword are the attributes of St. Paul, who is said to be shipwrecked on a small island in the bay. The sword is cross-shaped and therefore represents the new religion. The snake refers to the story told in Acts 28, v. 3–6, where St. Paul is attacked by a snake but is not injured. He throws the snake into the fire and the locals from that moment believe that he is a God.
	1993–present	Santa Luċija (village)	Sun on a black background.
	1993–present	Santa Venera (village)	Red flag with a white bar, and three red fleur-de-lis on the bar. The fleur de lys come from the arms of Grandmaster Alof de Wignacourt.
	1993–2001	Siġġiewi – Città Ferdinand (city)	A white background with a single red bar in the middle and a gold cross on the bar.
	2001–present	Siġġiewi – Città Ferdinand (city)	A white background with two red stripes and a golden cross depicting the villagers' faith in Christianity. Current flag was adopted in April 2001.
	1993–present	Sliema (town)	Traditional flag of Malta with a counterchanged Stella Maris. Similar to the flag of Naxxar.
	1993–present	Swieqi (village)	Saltire representing the suburb of Saint Andrew's, top and bottom quarters represent the suburb of Ibraġ, and others represent the main village of Swieqi.
	1993–present	Tarxien (village)	White flag divided by two blue vertical stripes.
	1993–present	Ta' Xbiex (village)	A yellow ship's wheel on a green background.
	1993–present	Il-Belt Valletta – Città Umilissima (capital city)	A red flag with a yellow lion rampant, taken from the arms of Grandmaster de Vallette.
	1993–2000	Xgħajra (village)	Three ears of wheat on a blue background.
	2000–present	Xgħajra (village)	The flag represents the beginning of the town, because the town started after the British government built a battery in what is now Xgħajra. The people working there started living round this battery and thus a small hamlet was formed, which eventually evolved into a small town. A variant flag is known to exist.
	1993–present	Żabbar – Città Hompesch (city)	Red flag with a white saltire.
	1993–2000	Żebbuġ – Città Rohan (city)	Nine red diamonds outlined in gold (arranged in three lines of three) on a red field.
	2000–present	Żebbuġ – Città Rohan (city)	A canting olive branch (held by a dove) above the arms of Grand Master de Rohan (nine red diamonds outlined in gold on a red field). A variant flag is known to exist.
	1993–present	Żejtun – Città Beland (city)	White rectangular flag quartered by a green cross.
	1993–present	Żurrieq (village)	White-blue horizontal bicolour, with a counterchanged cross in the middle. Similar to the flag of Naxxar.

=== Gozo ===
Flag	Date	Use	Description
	1993–present	Fontana (village)	A yellow flag, on its centre a disc of white and blue wavy stripes.
	1993–present	Għajnsielem (village)	Horizontally divided flag, the top stripe about half as wide as the bottom one. The top stripe is blue with a yellow six-pointed star, the bottom stripe is made of six horizontal white and blue wavy stripes.
	1993–present	Għarb (village)	Horizontally divided flag, the top stripe about half as wide as the bottom one, the separation line is serrated. The top stripe is blue with a yellow six-pointed star, the bottom stripe is white with a red tower.
	1993–present	Għasri (village)	Horizontally striped flag, green-yellow-khaki, stripes proportions about 2:3:1. The top stripe bears three millrinds, the middle stripe three trees.
	1993–present	Kerċem (village)	A white flag with a red horizontal line, and three gold rings on the line. Similar to the flag of Fgura.
	1993–present	Munxar (village)	Blue flag with a white bar with six points.
	1993–2000	Nadur (village)	A yellow sun emerging from the base of a blue flag.
	2000–present	Nadur (village)	The sun emerging from the sea.
	1993–present	Qala (village)	A Gozo boat, and a chief with three six-pointed stars.
	1993–present	San Lawrenz (village)	The flag shows St. Lawrence's grill and the palms of martyrdom.
	1993–present	Sannat (village)	A standing bale of wheat with two sickles above it.
	1993–present	Ir-Rabat – Città Victoria (capital)	The coat of arms of Victoria on a white flag with a red border. Three mountains above the sea in natural colour. The chief with "VR" are the abbreviation of "Victoria Regina" and were added upon Queen Victoria's jubilee in 1897. A variant flag is known to exist.
	1993–present	Xagħra (village)	Motif representing the Ggantija Temples.
	1993–present	Xewkija (village)	Yellow flag with a red bar, and thorns on the yellow parts of the flag.
	1993–present	Żebbuġ (town)	An olive tree, as the growing of olives is of great economic importance to the village, and a chief with three six-pointed stars.

== Political flags ==
Flag	Date	Party	Description
Active parties
Link to file	?–present	Nationalist Party	
Link to file	2008–present	Labour Party	
	1949–2008	Labour Party	
Defunct parties
	1921–1953	Constitutional Party	

== Religious flags ==
754–present	Archiepiscopal standard	A papal flag (two equal vertical stripes, yellow and white), but with the ratio: 2:3.
c.1938–present	Diocese of Gibraltar in Europe	The Saint George's Cross with the arms of the Diocese in the canton. Flown outside St Paul's Pro-Cathedral, Valletta, which is one of the Diocese's three cathedrals (alongside the Cathedral of the Holy Trinity, Gibraltar and the Pro-Cathedral of the Holy Trinity, Brussels).

== See also ==
- Flag of Malta
- Coat of arms of Malta
