= Flag of Seattle =

Seattle
- Proportion: 11:15
- Adopted: July 16, 1990
- Designed by: David Wright

The municipal flag of Seattle is teal and white, featuring the Seattle city logo (a portrait of Chief Seattle surrounded by two lines), with the words "City of Goodwill" above and "Seattle" below.

The flag was designed by architect David Wright and endorsed by Seattle City Councilmember Paul Kraabel. It was adopted on July 16, 1990, for use during the Goodwill Games.

The flag has been criticized for breaking conventional rules for good flag design, particularly its complex design that incorporates the city seal.

Proposals to redesign the flag were solicited in 2019 by The Seattle Times and The Stranger, with the latter running a public poll.

== Symbolism ==
Council resolution 28207 states that the color of the Flag of Seattle "shall be white and teal blue/green (the color of Puget Sound at dusk)."

== Controversy over the use of Chief Seattle as a logo ==
On August 6, 2021, the Sauk-Suiattle tribe called on the mayor and the City Council to live up to the legacy of Chief Seattle and help restore the region's salmon supply by allowing for fish passage through 3 dams managed by Seattle City Light or cease to use his likeness. In their open letter they state:

"Sealth, or Chief Seattle, was a person known for his integrity. He believed there was no separation between people and nature. In tribal culture, the bestowal of a name carries with it a duty to live up to that name. City of Seattle, live up to the values of your namesake, or cease bearing his image as the Great Seal of the City of Seattle."

As of September 28, 2021, the Sauk-Suiattle tribe had not heard back from the mayor or any of the City Council members. The tribe says that the lack of response is especially insulting given the city's support for other tribes out of state, including the Standing Rock Sioux. In 2016 the mayor signed a declaration of support over the Dakota Access Pipeline controversy. Jack Fiander, the legal counsel for the Sauk-Suiattle tribe goes on to state:

"When it's easy, when it's not in your back yard Seattle, you will support the Standing Rock people, you will call for the removal of Snake River dams; but you have three dams in our territory that don't have fish passage while these fish are going extinct."

== Alternative proposal ==
In May 2022 the Seattle Office of Arts and Culture awarded a non-profit named Seattle City Flag grant funding to begin piloting their contemporary city flag for Seattle in coffee shops across the city. The contemporary design aligns the flag of Seattle with the original symbol used during the Goodwill Games, a design which the officially adopted flag is inspired by.

=== Symbolism ===
Keeping the colors, the contemporary design's teal represents the colors of Puget Sound at dusk, and the white represent the mountains wrapping around the city. Each wave is designated to represent an inclusive and diverse history / cultural event from Seattle's past.

The interconnection of each wave represents "the future well-being, if not survival of all citizens, is dependent upon our recognition of common bonds and shared responsibilities", also from the original resolution.

=== History ===
The symbol on the flag is the original design used to represent the Seattle Goodwill Games. The Games began on July 20, 1990, and after the Games ended, the Seattle Organizing Committee for the Goodwill Games no longer continued use of the design. On October 7, 1996, the design's trademark registration lapsed.

The design was used throughout the competition to reference the event with multiple uses from hats, pins, flags, shirts, and even in the middle of the field at the University of Washington Husky Stadium where events were held.

== See also ==
- Seal of Seattle
