= Flag of Dallas =

City of Dallas
- Use: Other
- Proportion: 2:3
- Adopted: February 13, 1967; 59 years ago
- Designed by: E. L. Gilchrist

The current flag of Dallas, Texas, was adopted February 13, 1967. The flag was designed by E. L. Gilchrist.

== Design ==
It is bisected horizontally by a thin white line (a fimbriation, approximately 1/27th of the flag's height) with a dark red top and a dark blue bottom. A large, white 5-pointed star (approximately 14/15ths of the flag's height) dominates the flag and contains the city seal in buff and black.

== History ==
=== Past flags ===
The flag in use between 1916 and 1967 (though it was not actually produced until 1954) was a non-rectangular flag (similar to the flag of Ohio) colored blue, but unlike the current flag, there is no fimbriation. The center of the flag contains the state of Texas in white with a star and the name "Dallas" marking the city's position in the state.

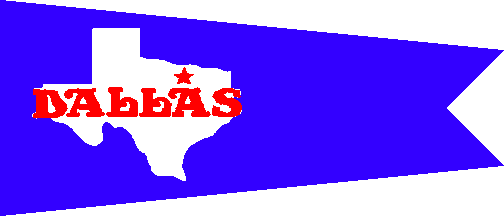
1916–1954

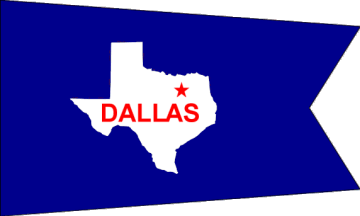
1954–1967

=== Current flag ===
The current flag was designed by E. L. Gilchrist, and was officially adopted by the city of Dallas on February 13, 1967. In 2015, The Dallas Morning News stated that while the flag was unlikely to change, it was time to change it. D Magazine proposed a redesign featuring a Pegasus, claiming that it would be easier for children.

=== Pride variant ===
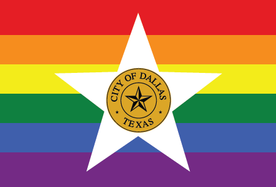
The pride variant flag of Dallas, Texas

On June 17, 2020, a variant of the flag was approved by the city council to be flown in place of the primary flag during Pride Month in support of the LGBTQ people. The variant features the city's seal with the blue and red background replaced with a rainbow. The rainbow version was used for the remainder of June 2020 and returned in June of the following years. In June 2023, Dallas's deputy mayor, assured that the city had no plans to end the tradition and called the city itself a "gigantic rainbow flag."
