= List of flags of Peru =

This is a list of flags used in or otherwise associated with Peru. For more information on the national flag, see Flag of Peru.

== National flags ==
=== Current ===
Flag	Date	Use	Description
	1950–present	National flag	Red-white-red vertical triband
	1825–present	State flag, state and naval ensign	Red-white-red vertical triband defaced with the national shield of Peru.
	1901–present	War flag	Red-white-red vertical triband defaced with the coat of arms of Peru.
	1950–present	Vertical flag	
	1950–present	Vertical swallowtail flag	

=== Historical flags ===
Flag	Date	Use	Description
	1542–1824	Former flag of Peru	Flag of the Viceroyalty of Peru featuring the Cross of Burgundy.
	1785–1824	Flag of Spain	Last Spanish flag to fly in continental America.
	1780–1783	Flag of the Túpac Amaru II rebellion	Flag of the Rebellion of Túpac Amaru II.
	1821–1822	Former flag of Peru	First flag of Peru, created by José de San Martín.
	1822	Former flag of Peru	Second flag, created by José Bernardo de Tagle, a horizontal triband defaced with a golden sun.
	1822–1825	Former flag of Peru	Third flag, by José Bernardo de Tagle, a vertical triband defaced with a golden sun.
	1825–1884	Former flag of Peru and North Peru	Fourth flag, by José Gregorio Paredes and Francisco Javier Cortés, a vertical triband defaced with the second version of the coat of arms.
	1884–1950	Former flag of Peru	Same as the former flag, with two leaves in the coat of arms broken to symbolize the loss of Arica and Tarapacá.
	1836–1839	Flag of the Peru-Bolivian Confederation	Flag of the Peru-Bolivian Confederation.
	1836–1839	Flag of South Peru	Flag of South Peru, a constituent republic within the Peru-Bolivian Confederation.
	1821–1839	Flag of Iquicha	Iquicha, a rebel against Peru and in favor of Spain. It later joined the Peru-Bolivian Confederation.

== Government flags ==
Flag	Date	Use	Description
		Presidential flag	White flag with the coat of arms of Peru at the center, with five suns in splendour at the corners.
		Judiciary flag	
		Flag for the Minister of Defence	

== Military flags ==
Flag	Date	Use	Description
		War flag of Peru (Bandera de Guerra)	Red-white-red triband defaced with the Coat of arms of Peru.
		Naval jack of the Navy of Peru	A square flag, consisting of a white square with the Coat of Arms (Escudo de Armas) on a red field.
		Flag of the Joint Command	Red flag with the emblem of the Joint Command of the Armed Forces of Peru in the center.
		Flag of the Chief of the Joint Command	
		Flag of the Peruvian Army	Green flag with the emblem of the Peruvian army in the center.
		Flag of the Peruvian Navy	Dark blue flag with the emblem of the Peruvian navy in the center.
		Flag of the Peruvian Air Force	Blue flag with the emblem of the Peruvian air force in the center.
		Rank flag of the General Commander of the Navy	
		Rank flag of vicealmirante (vice admiral)	
		Rank flag of contraalmirante (counter admiral)	
		Rank flag of capitán de navío (captain)	

== Political flags ==
Flag	Date	party	Description
		Cambio 90 - New Majority	The orange flag, the main emblem of the majority of Fujimori political movements and organizations.
		Popular Force	
		Sí Cumple	
		American Popular Revolutionary Alliance	
		Shining Path	Red flag with the hammer and sickle in canton.
		Militarized Communist Party of Peru	Red flag with the hammer and sickle in canton.
		Túpac Amaru Revolutionary Movement	
		Revolutionary Union	
		Peru 2000	
		Falange Perú	
		Falange Universitaria	
		Free Peru	
		Revolutionary Left Movement	
		National Liberation Army	
		Ethnocacerist Movement	
		Frente de Izquierda Revolucionaria	
		Sociedad de Patriotas del Perú	Mashup of the Cross of Burgundy with the Incan imperial standard.
		Popular Renewal	
		Front of Hope 2021	

== Proposed flags ==
Flag	Date	Use	Description
	1820	Proposed flag of Peru	Proposed flag of 1820 by General William Miller.
	2022	Proposed flag of Peru	Proposed flag of 2022 by Nieves Limachi Quispe.

== Subnational flags ==
=== Departments ===
Amazonas

Ancash

Apurímac

Arequipa

Ayacucho

Cajamarca

Callao

Cuzco

Huancavelica

Huánuco

Junín

La Libertad

Lambayeque

Lima

Lima Province

Loreto

Madre de Dios

Moquegua

Pasco

Piura

Puno

San Martín

Tacna

Tumbes

Ucayali

=== Provinces ===
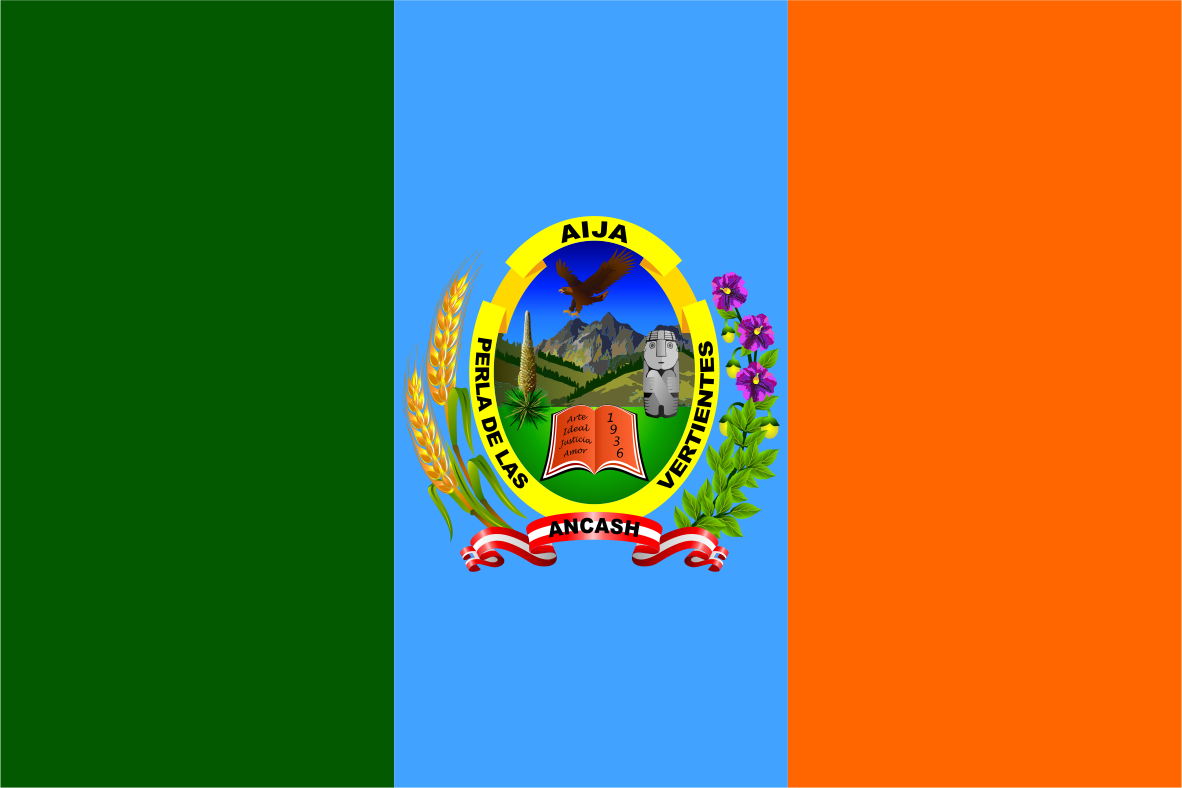
Aija

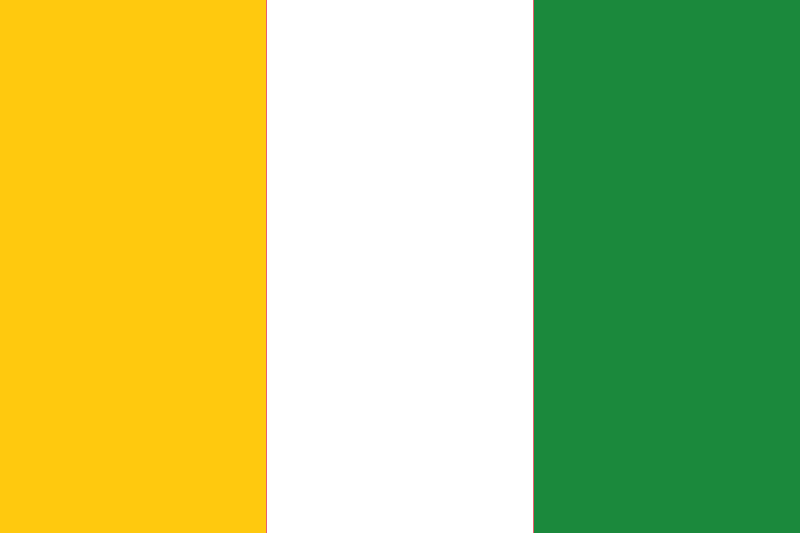
Alto Amazonas

Andahuaylas

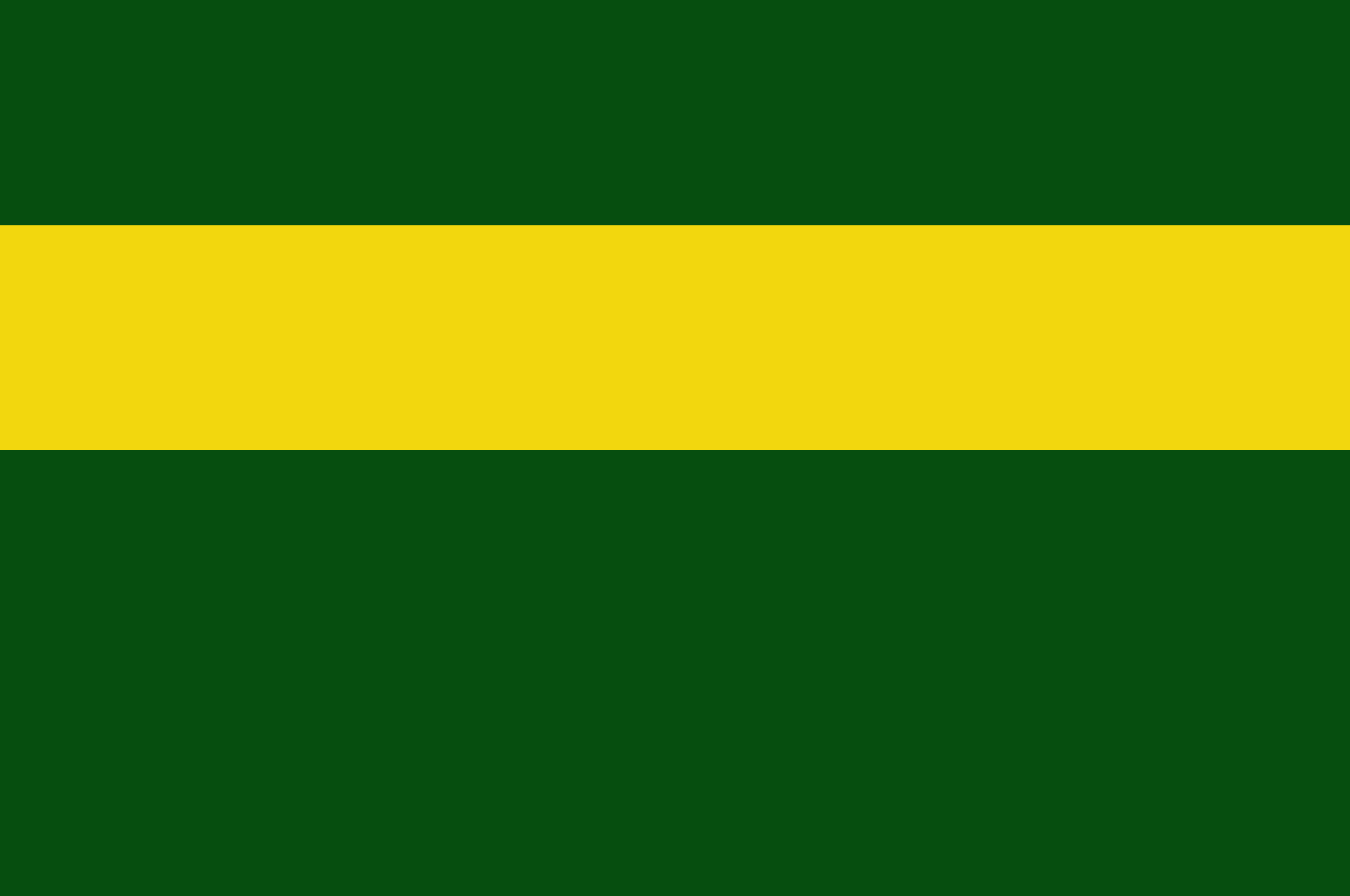
Anta

Arequipa

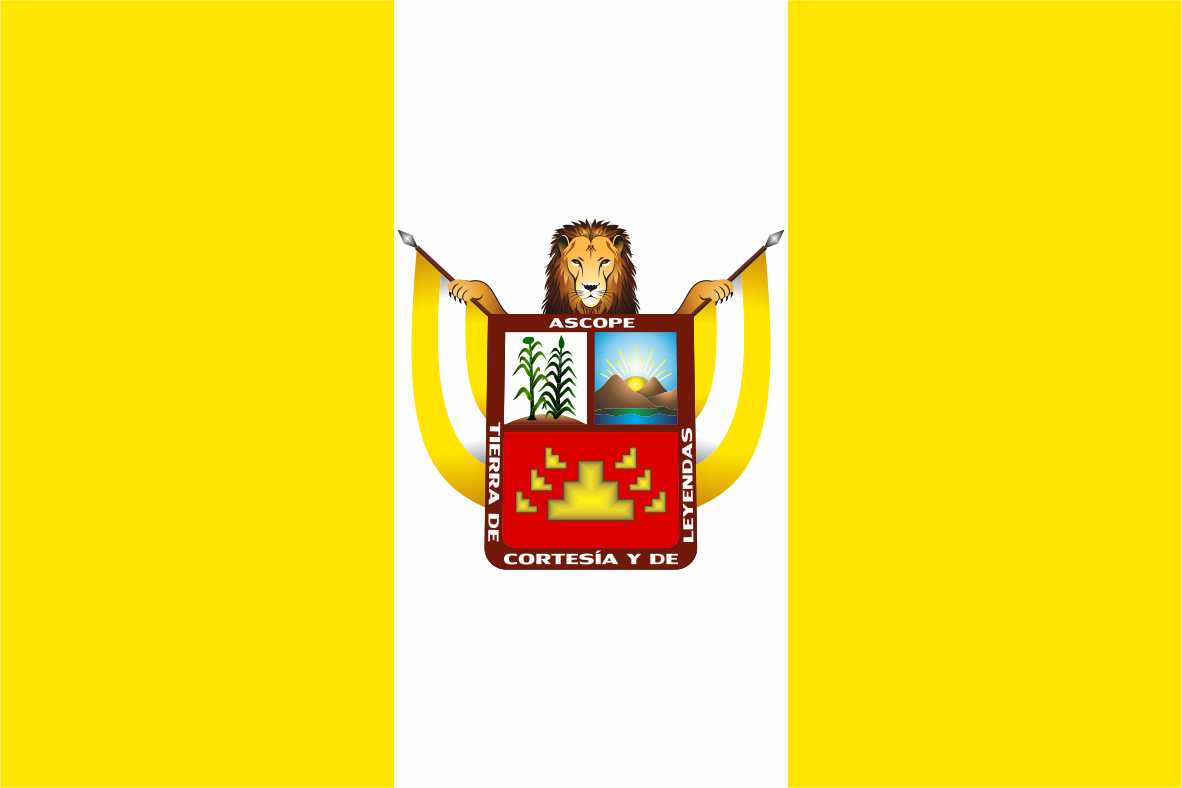
Ascope

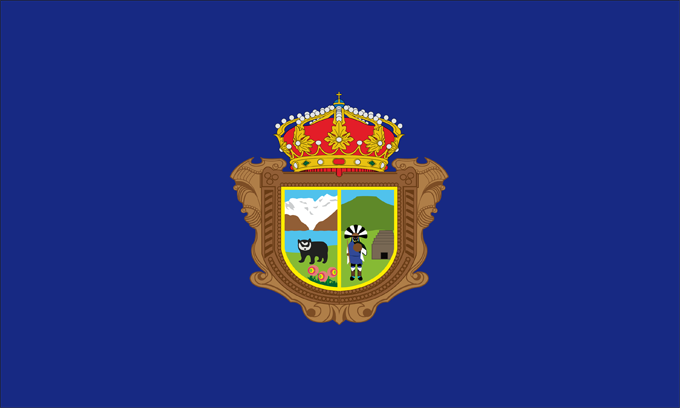
Asunción

Ayabaca

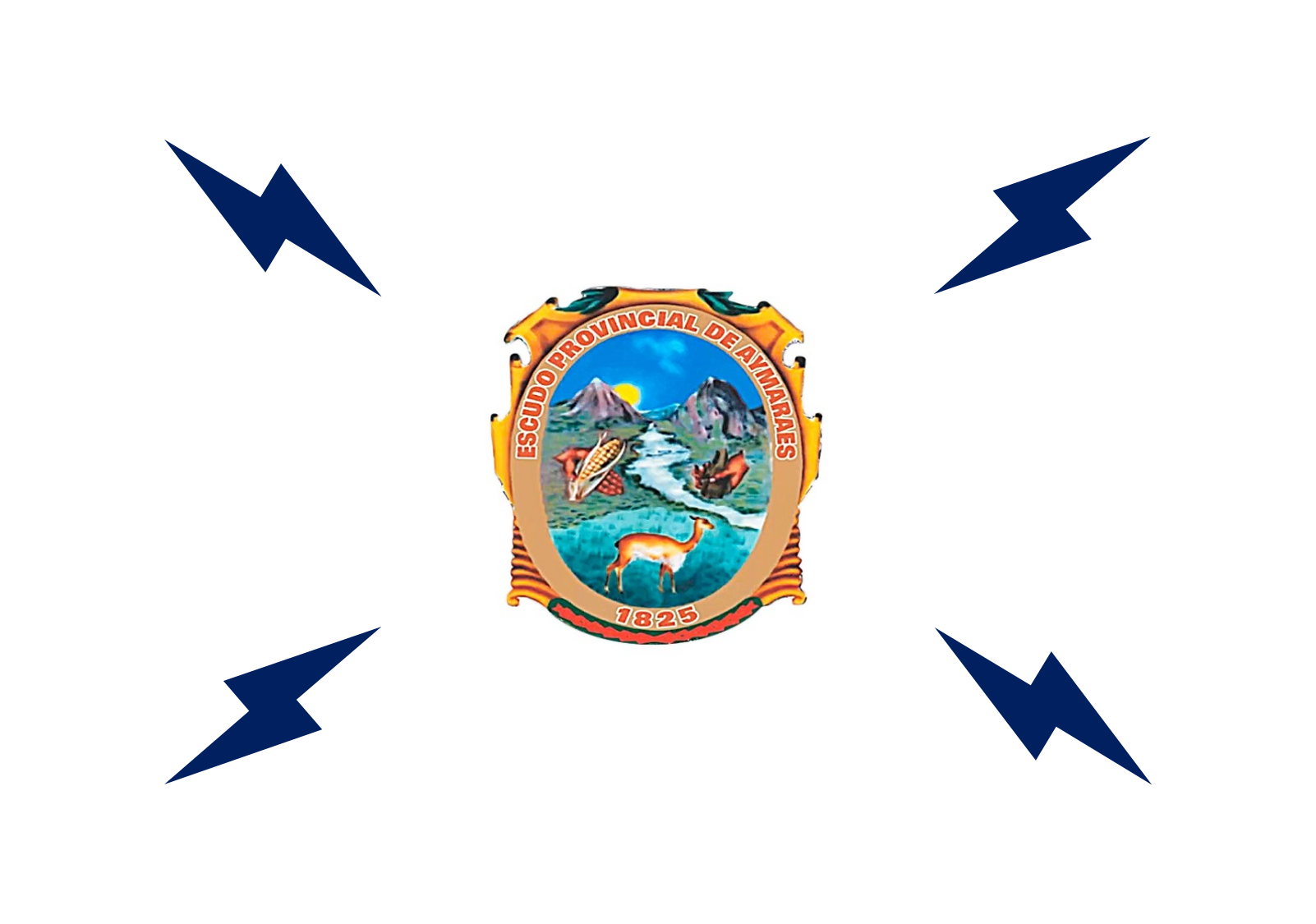
Aymaraes

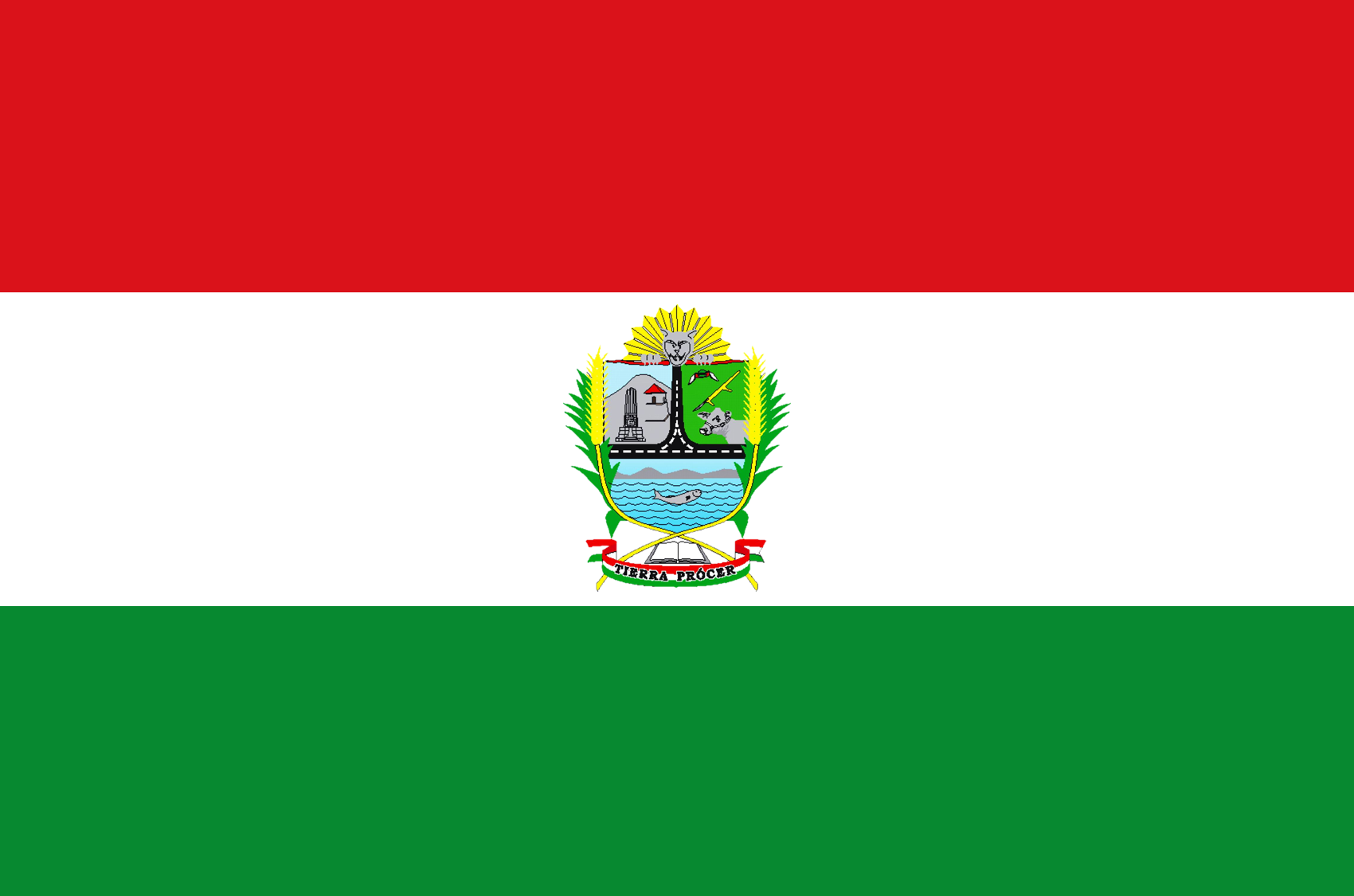
Azángaro

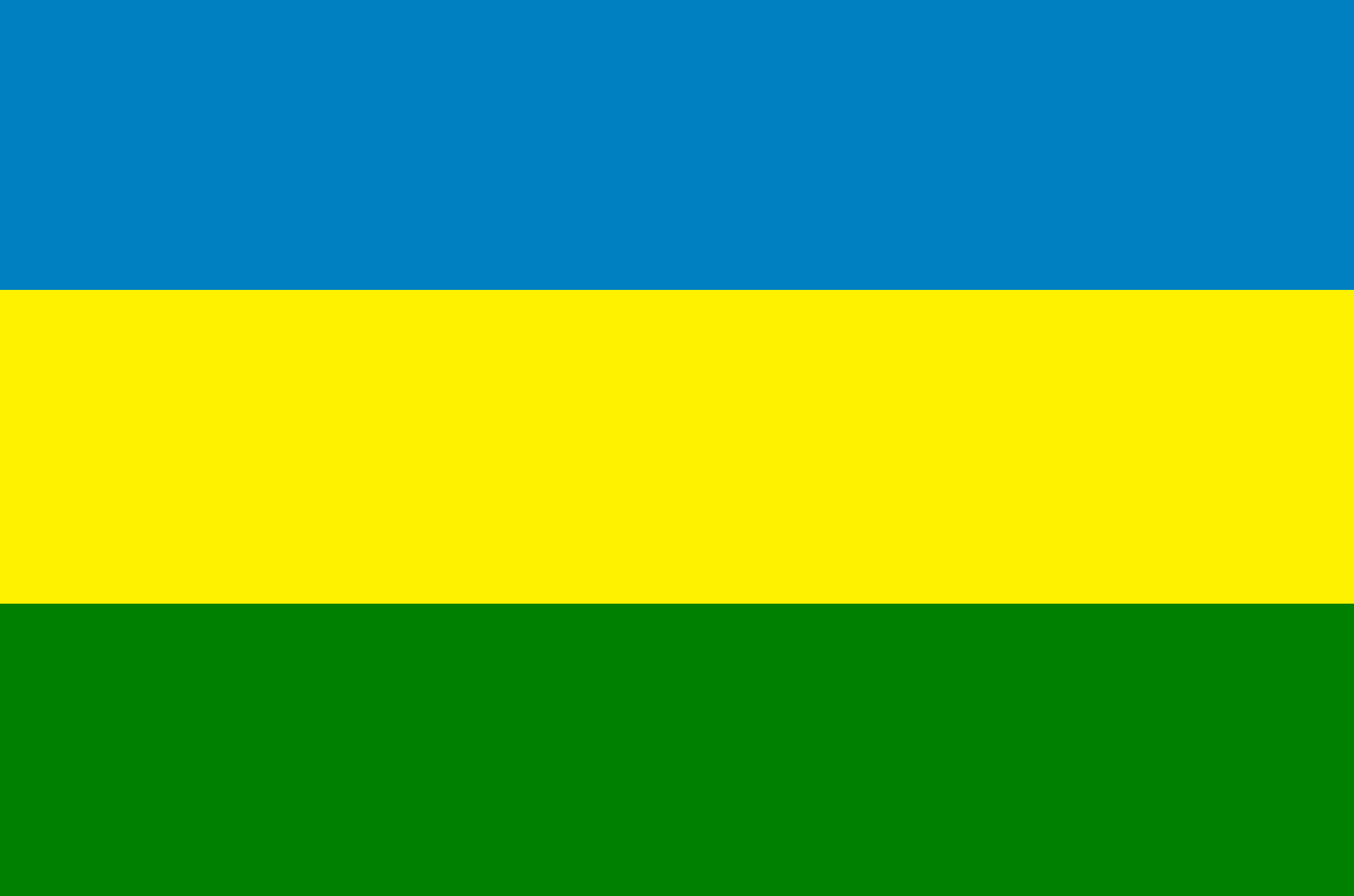
Bagua

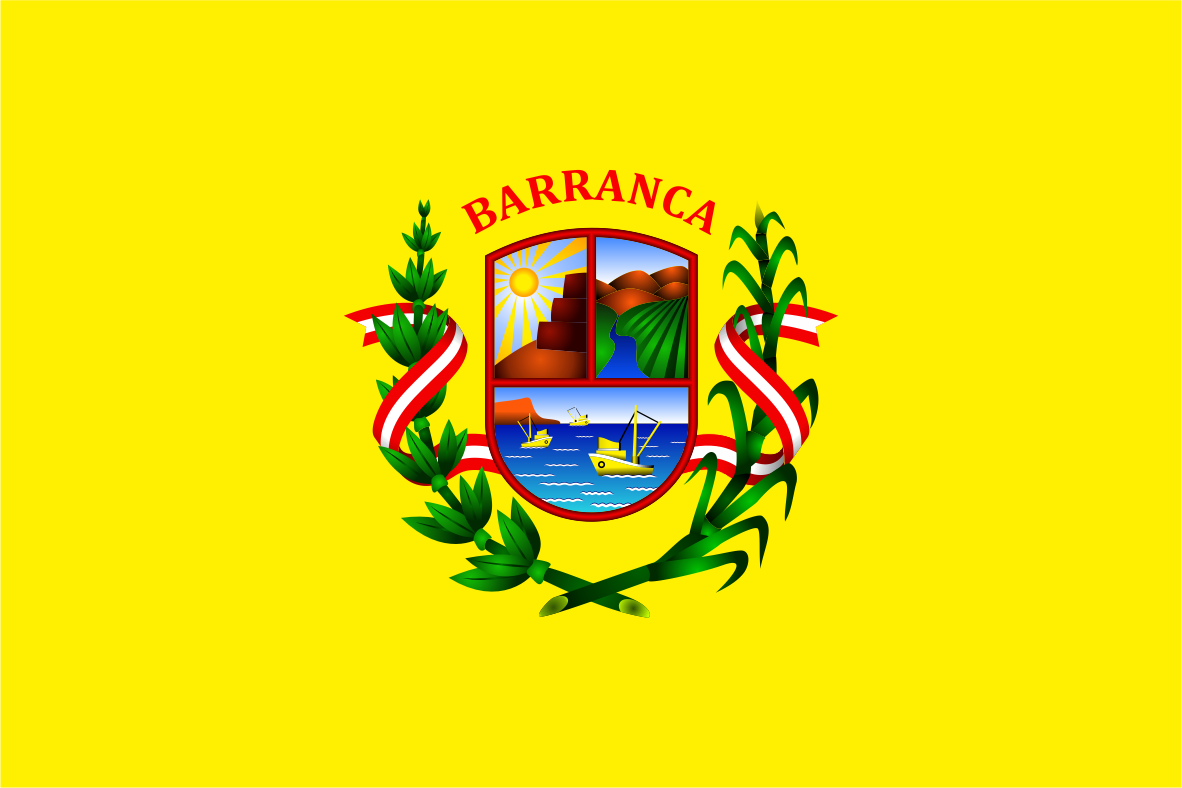
Barranca

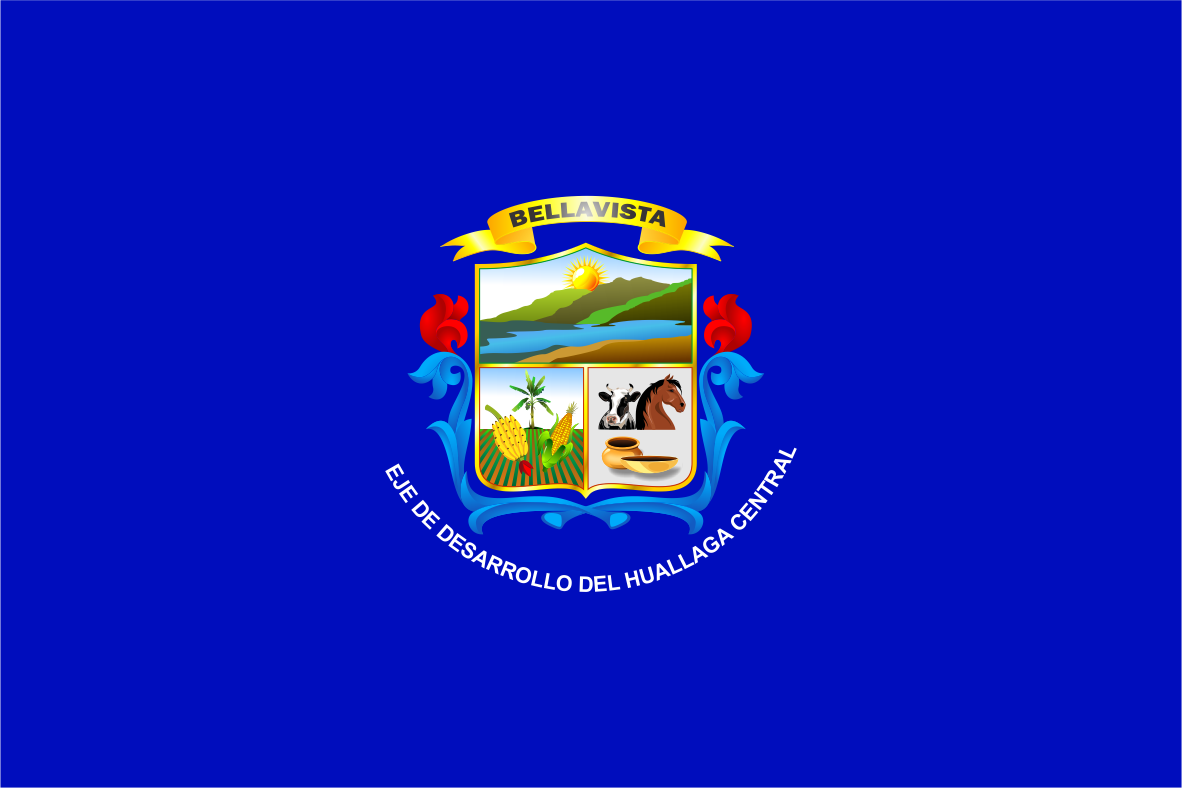
Bellavista

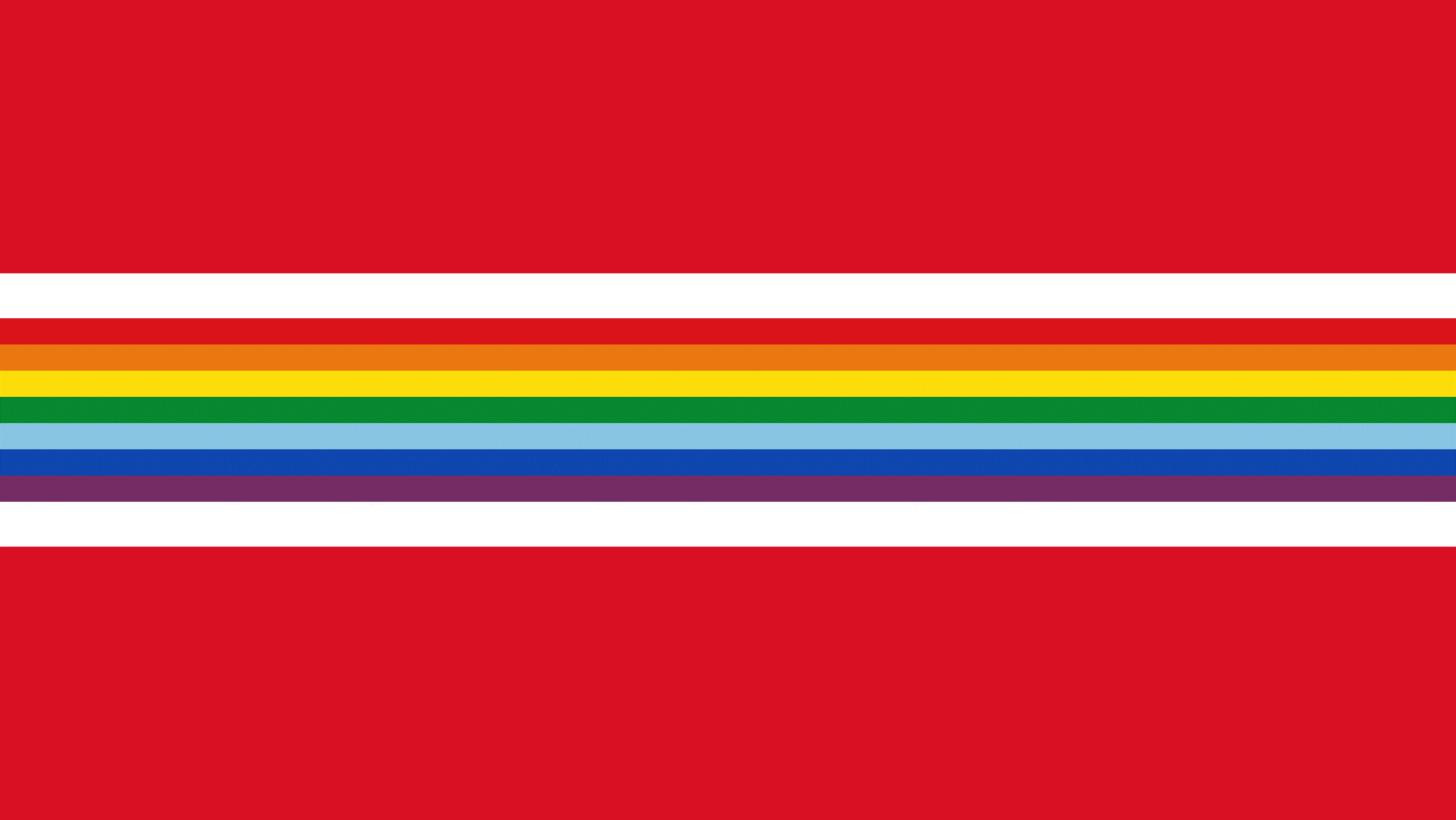
Canas

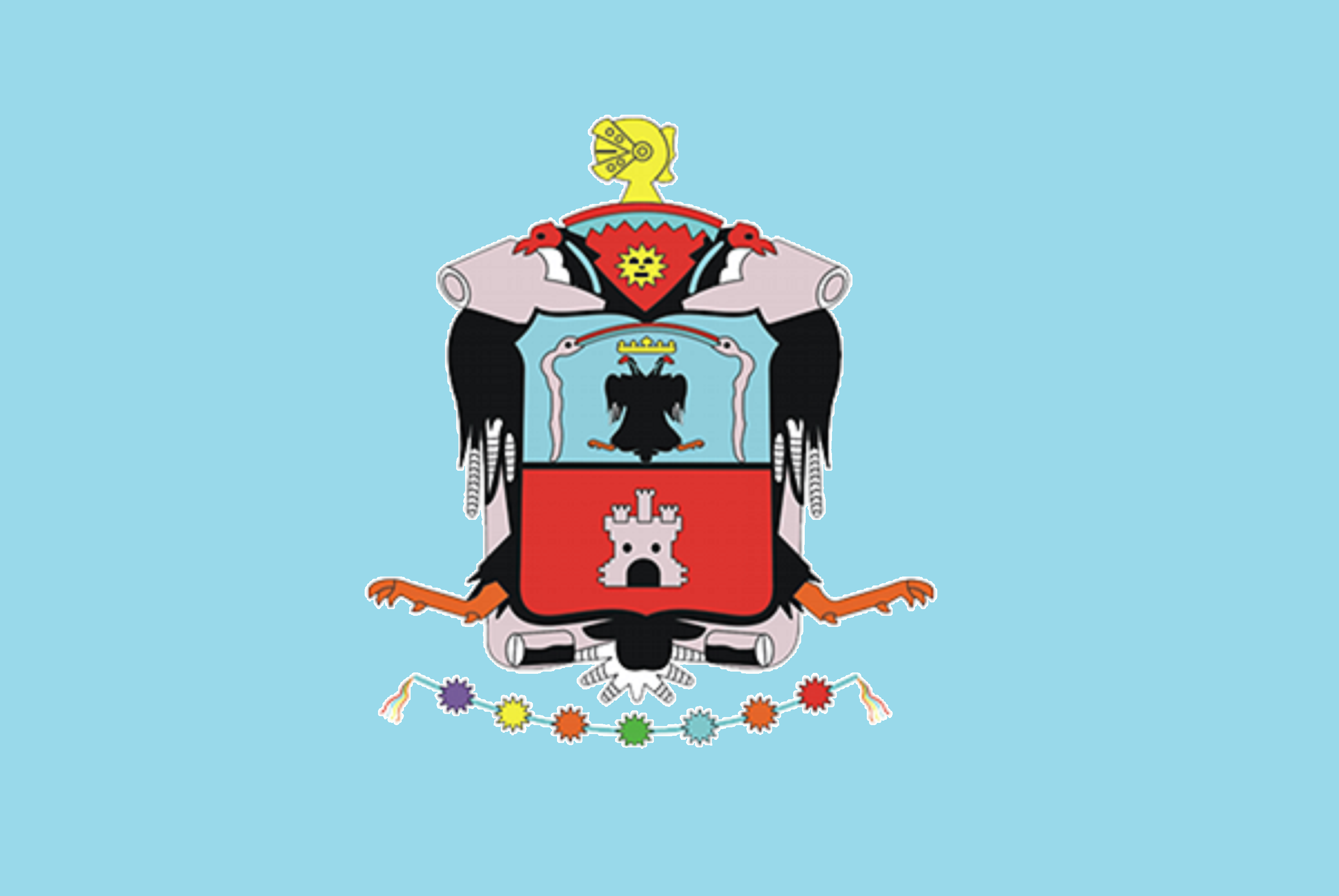
Canchis Province

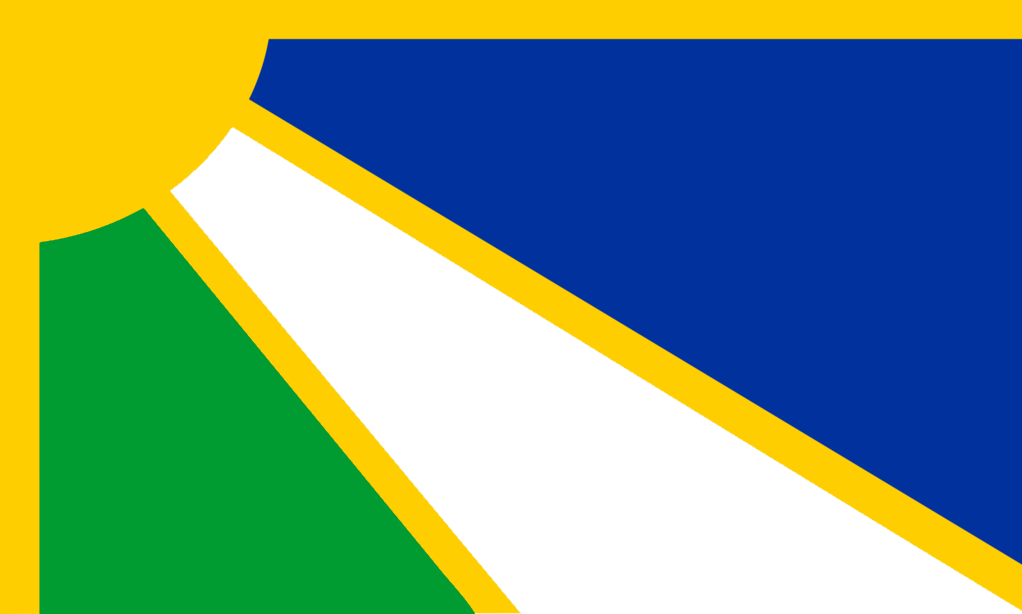
Bolívar

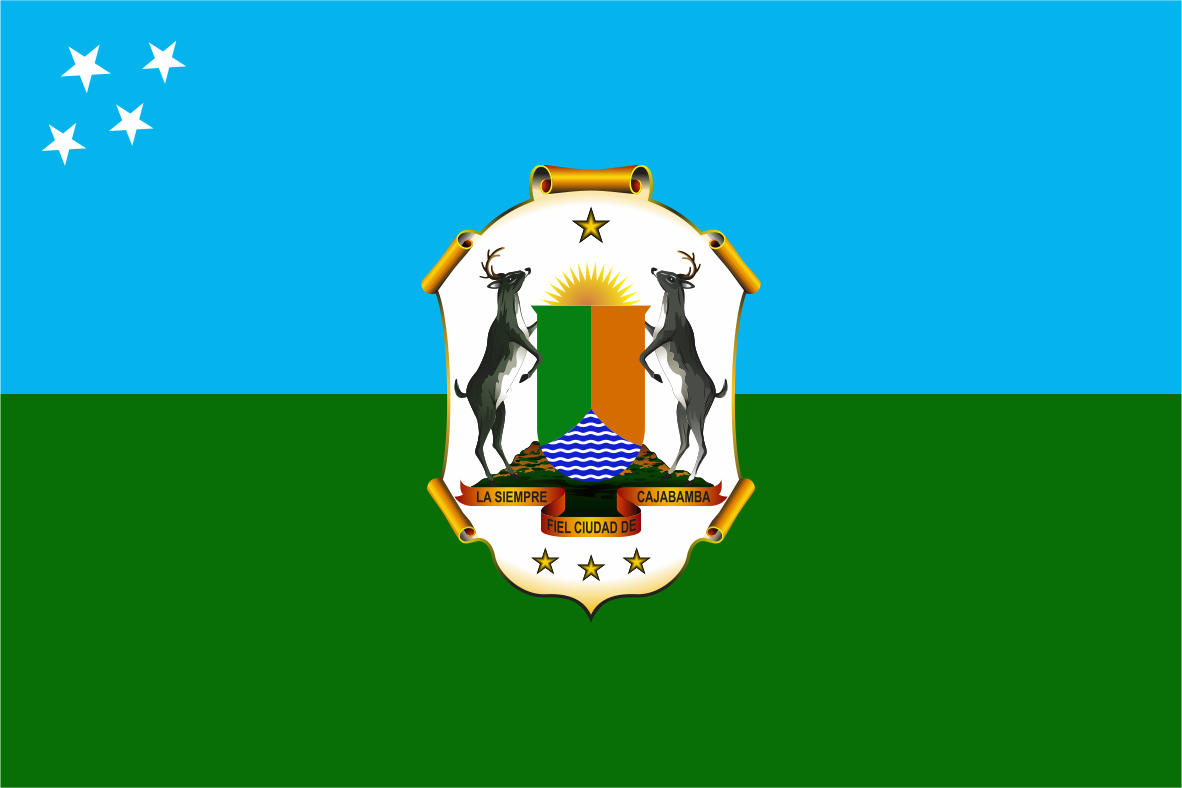
Cajabamba

Cajamarca

Callao

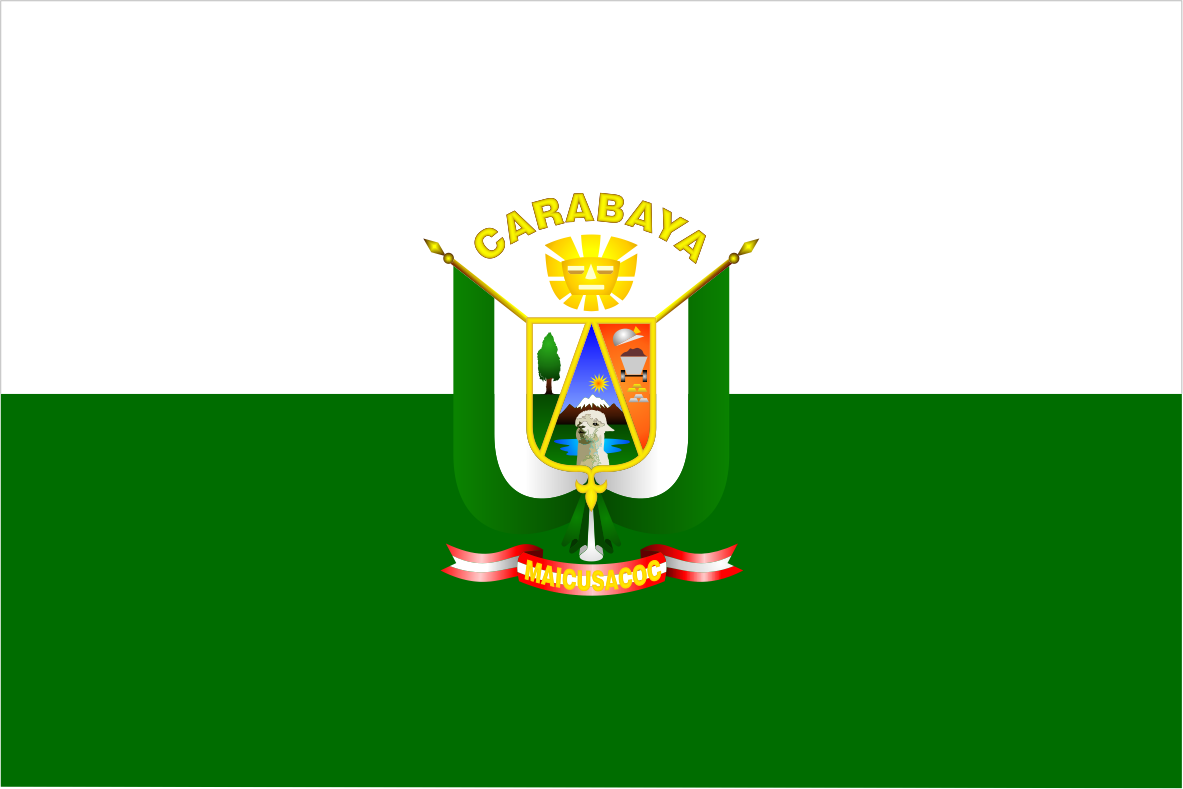
Carabaya

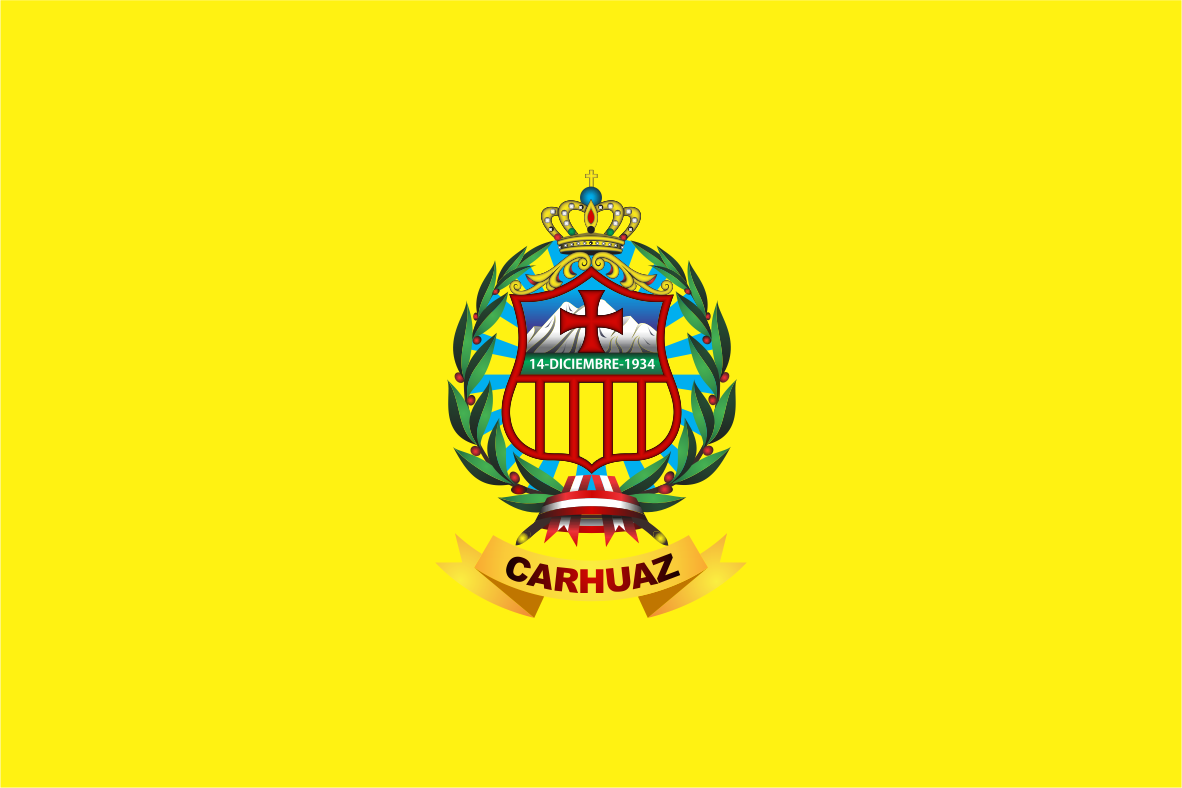
Carhuaz

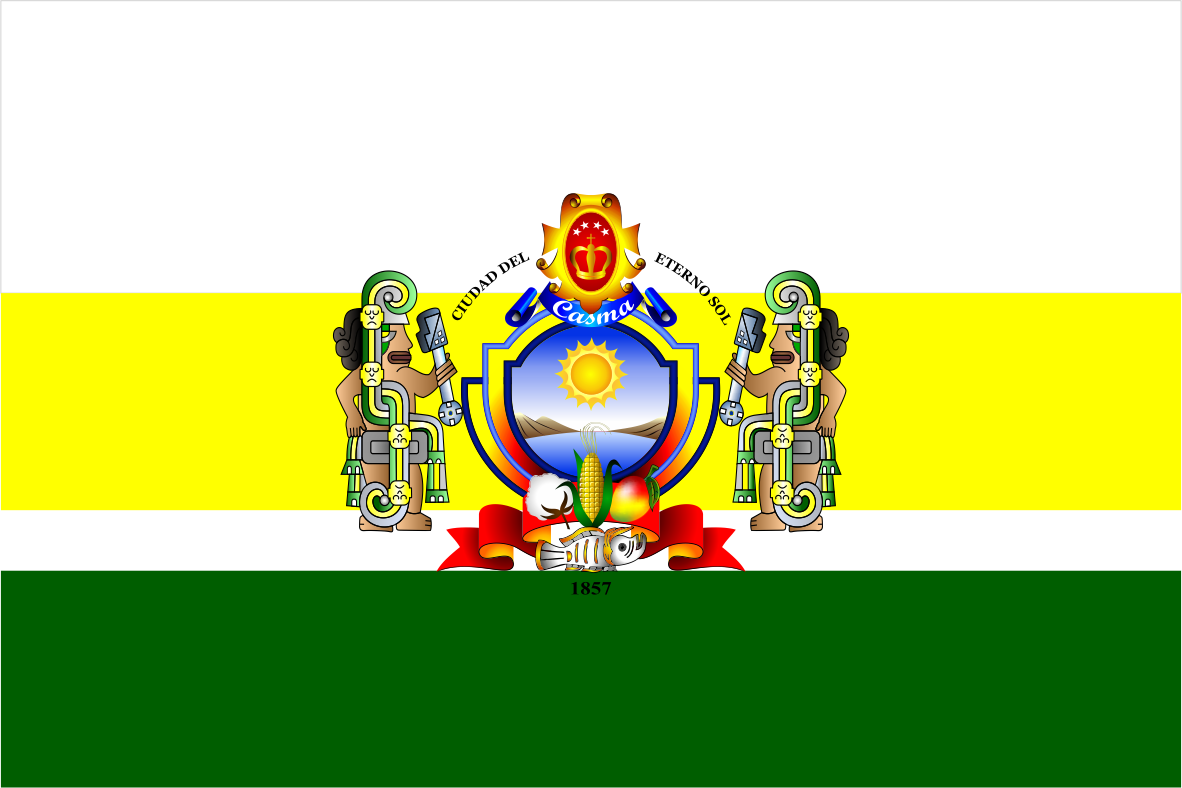
Casma

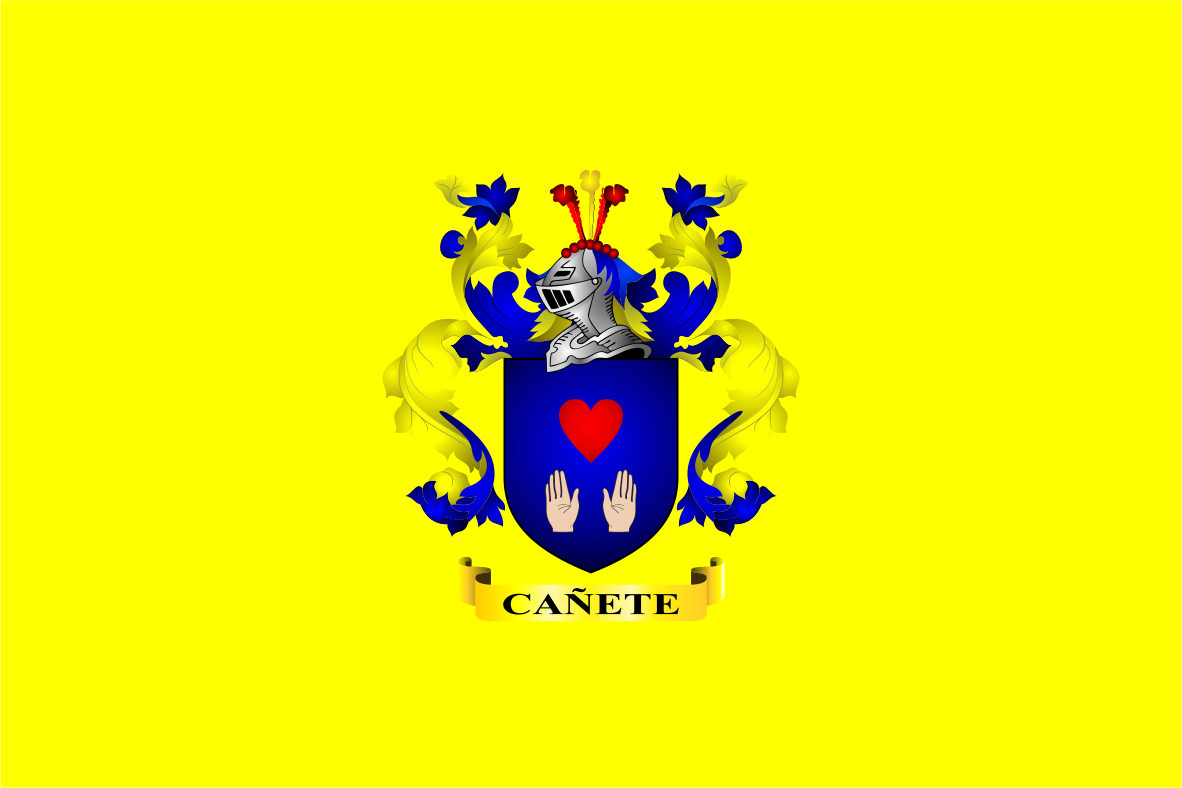
Cañete

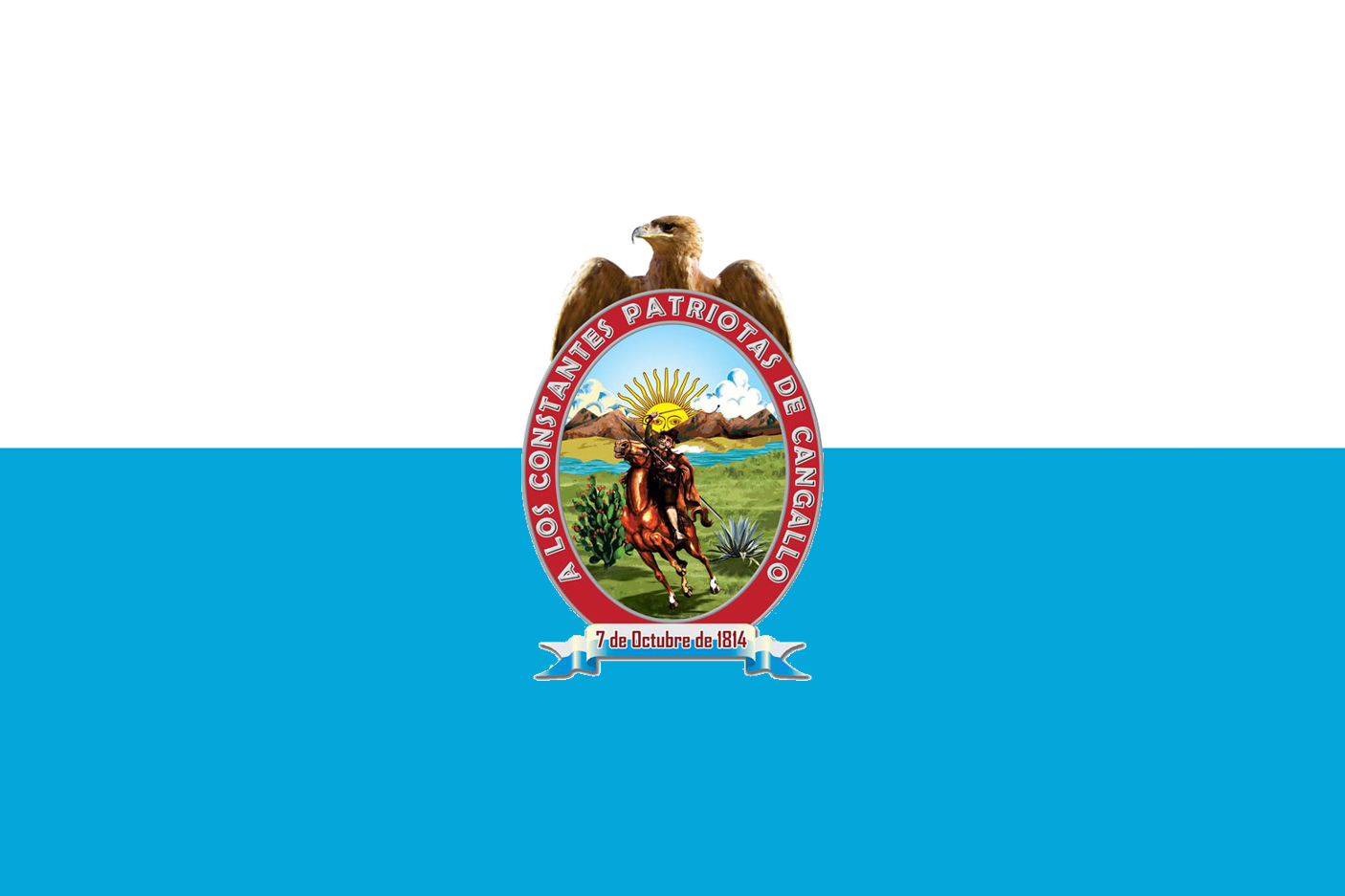
Cangallo

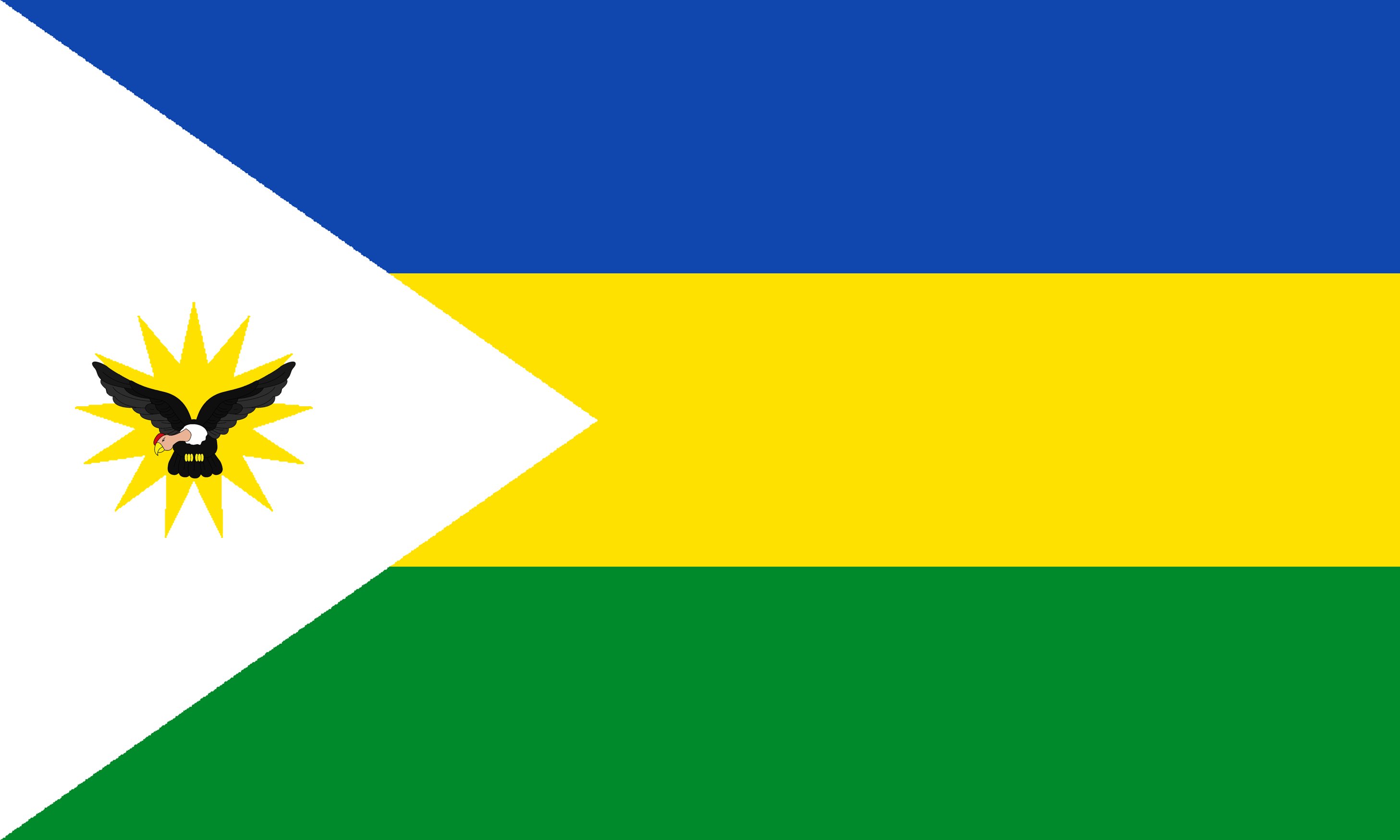
Candarave

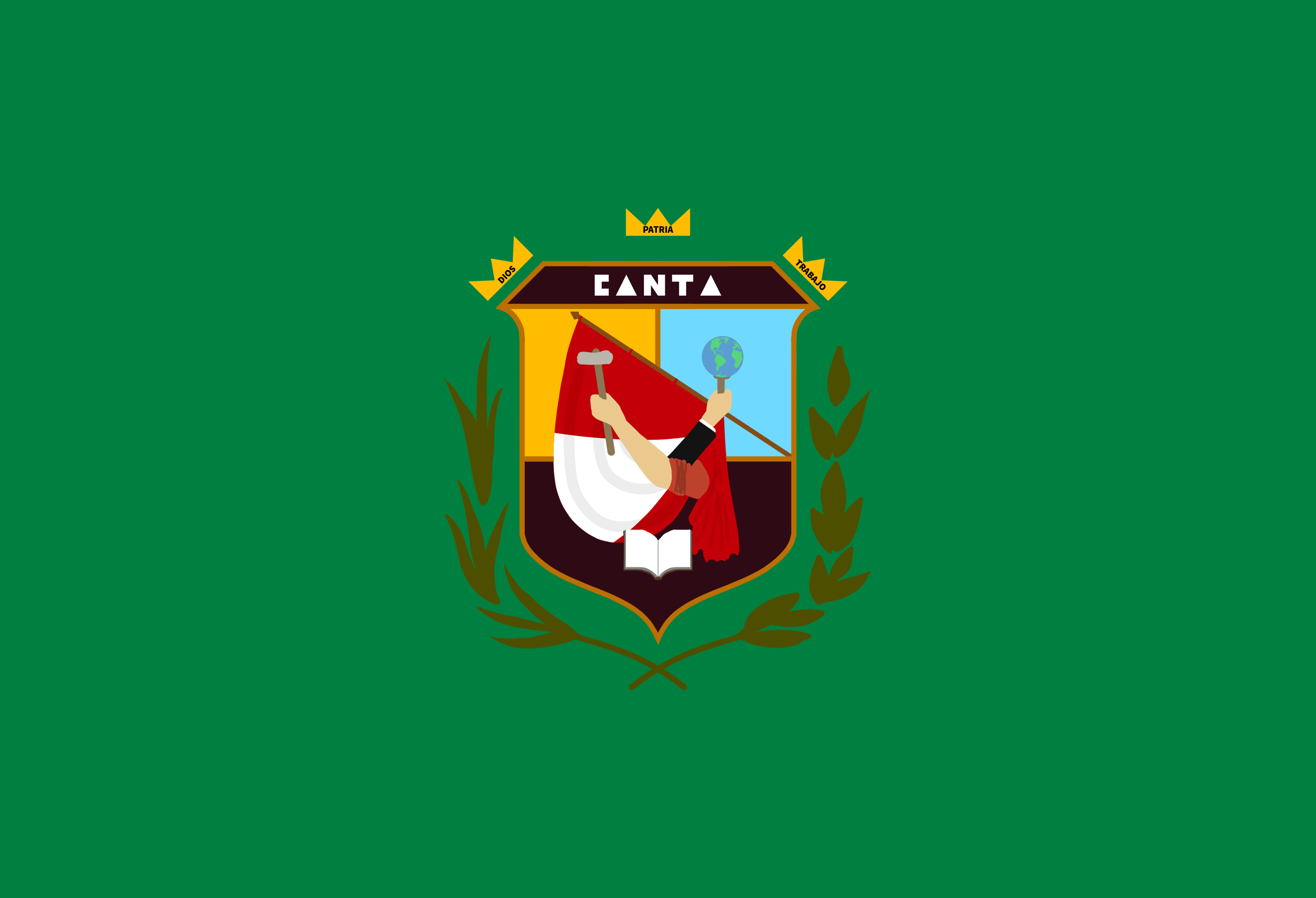
Canta

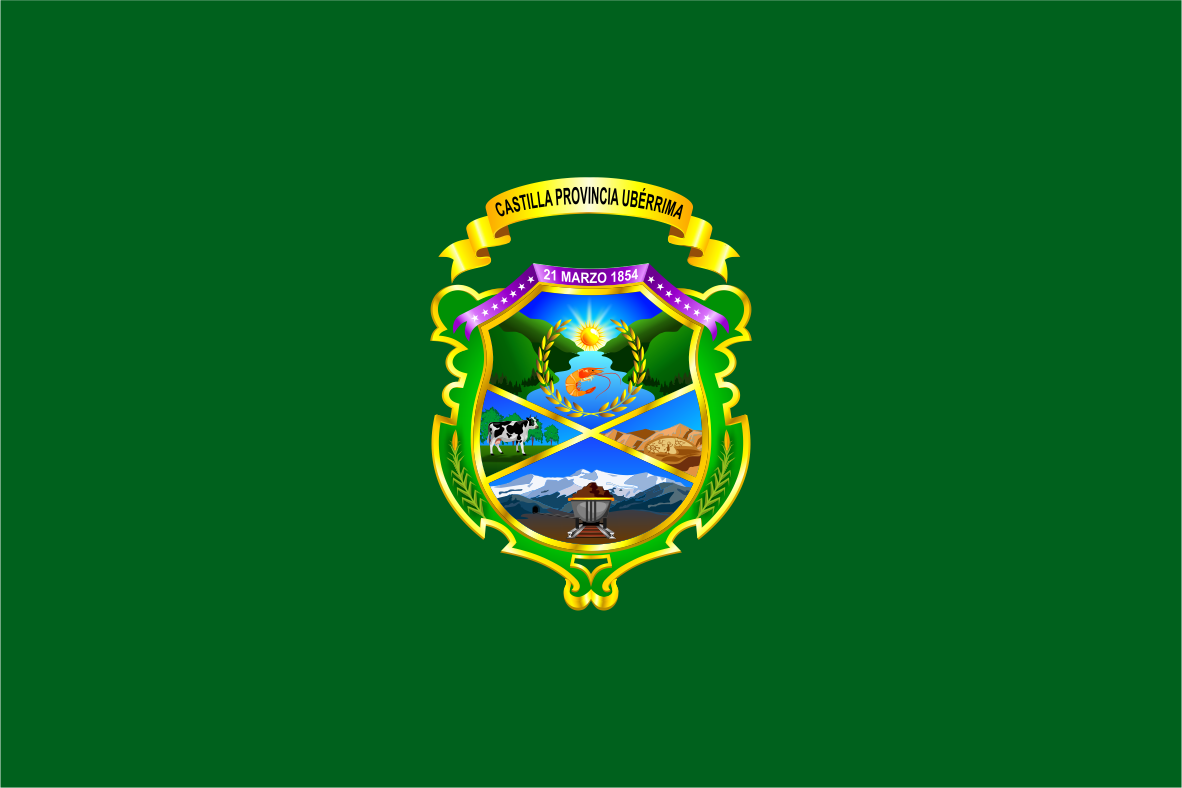
Castilla

Carlos Fermín Fitzcarrald

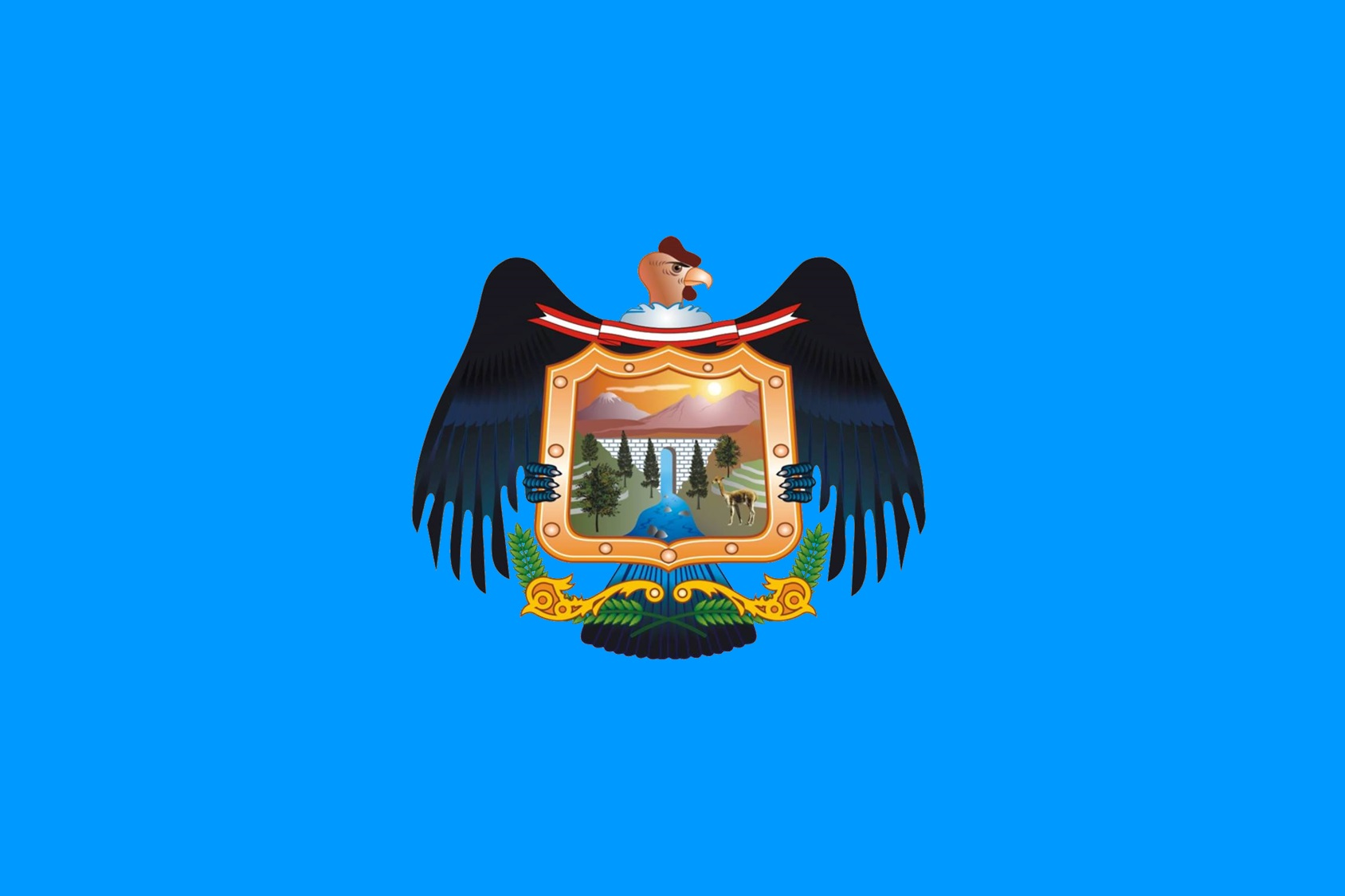
Caylloma

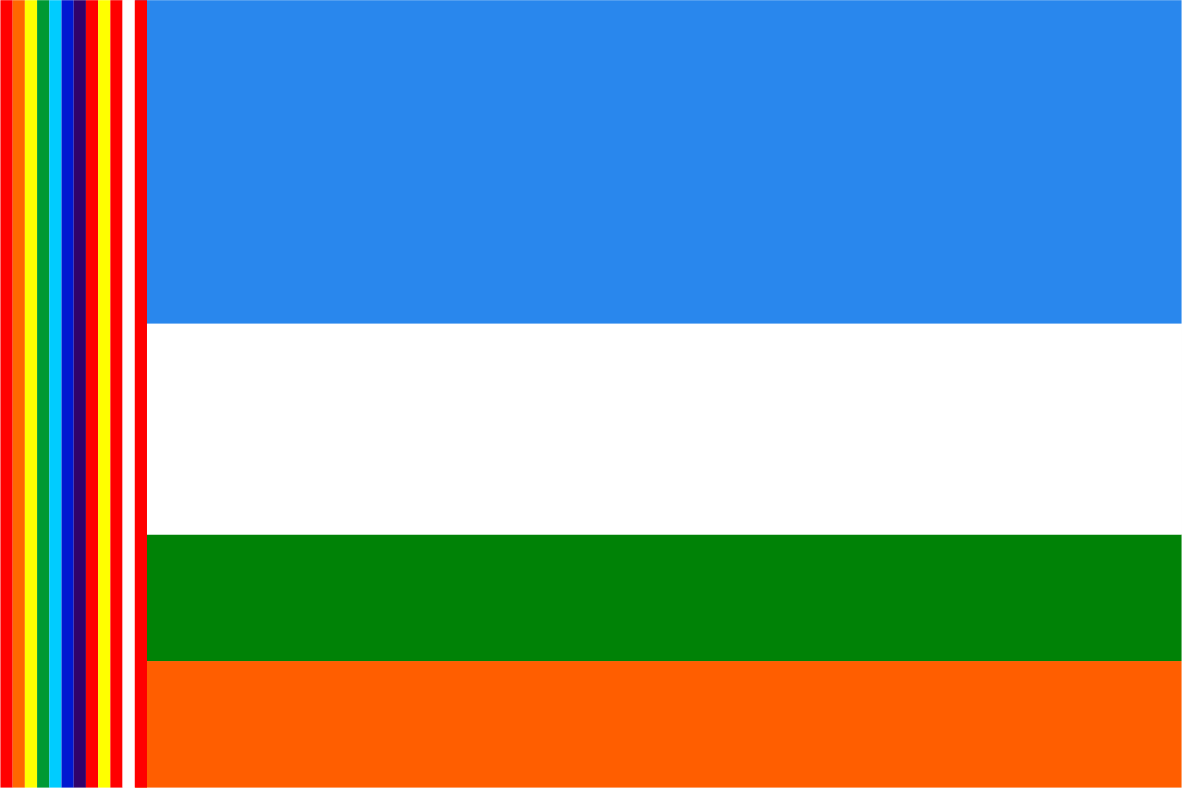
Celendín

Chanchamayo

Chachapoyas

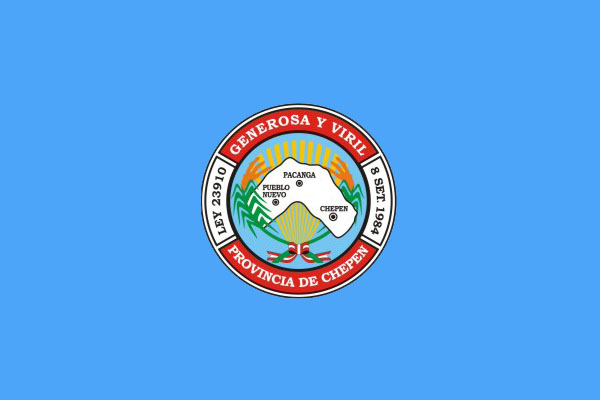
Chepén

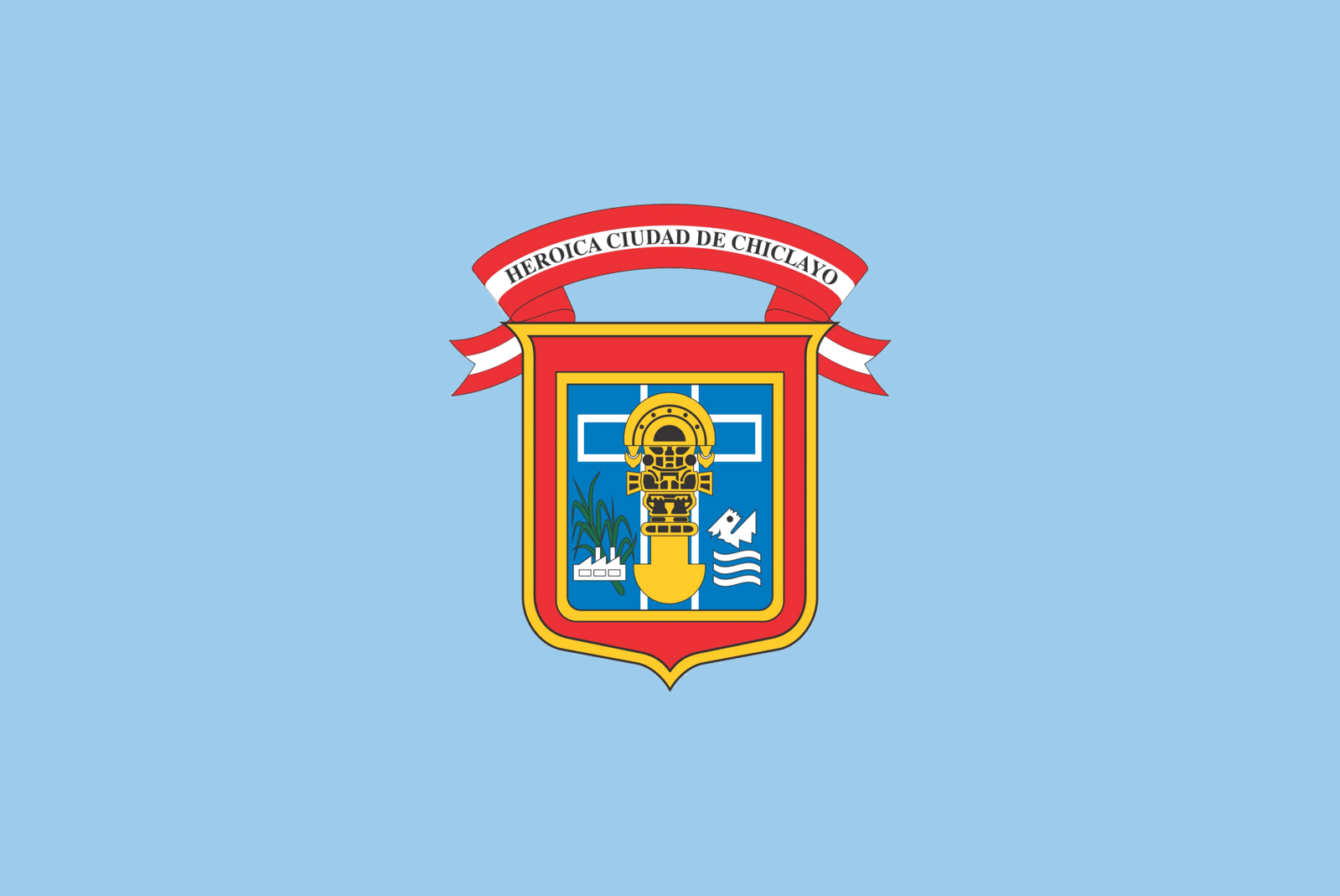
Chiclayo

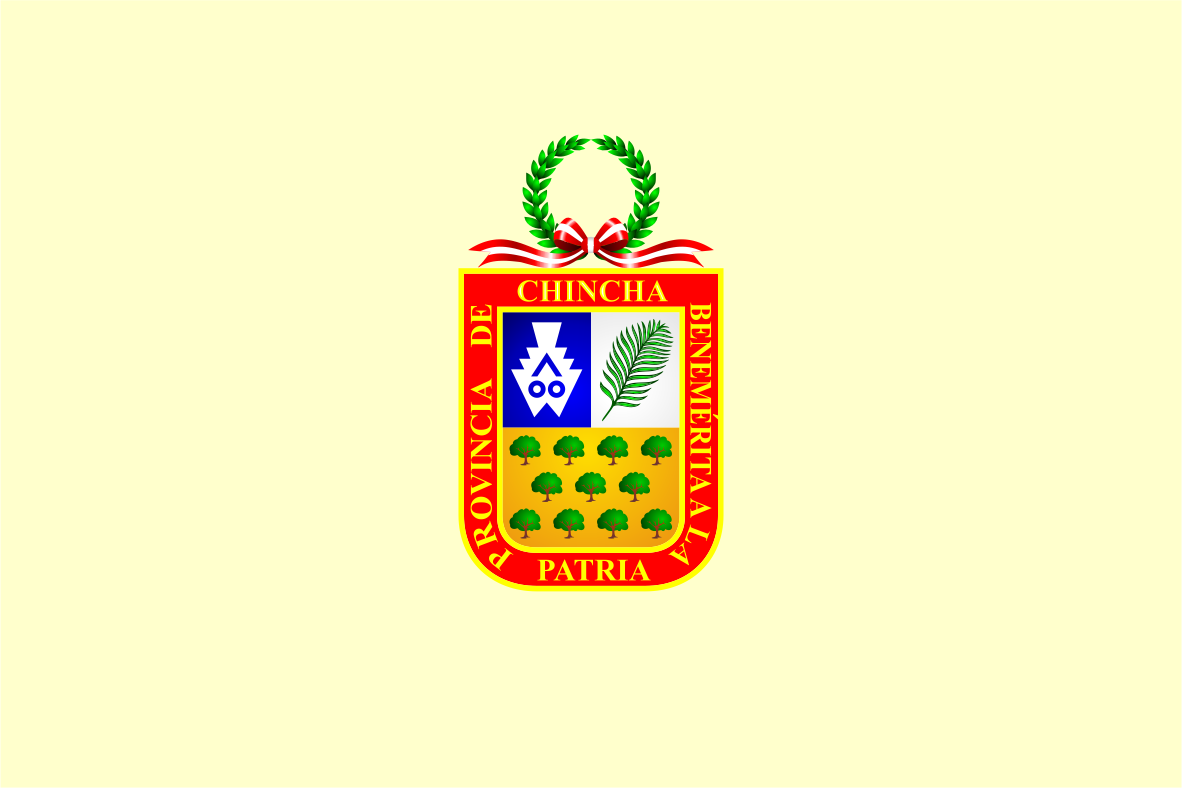
Chincha

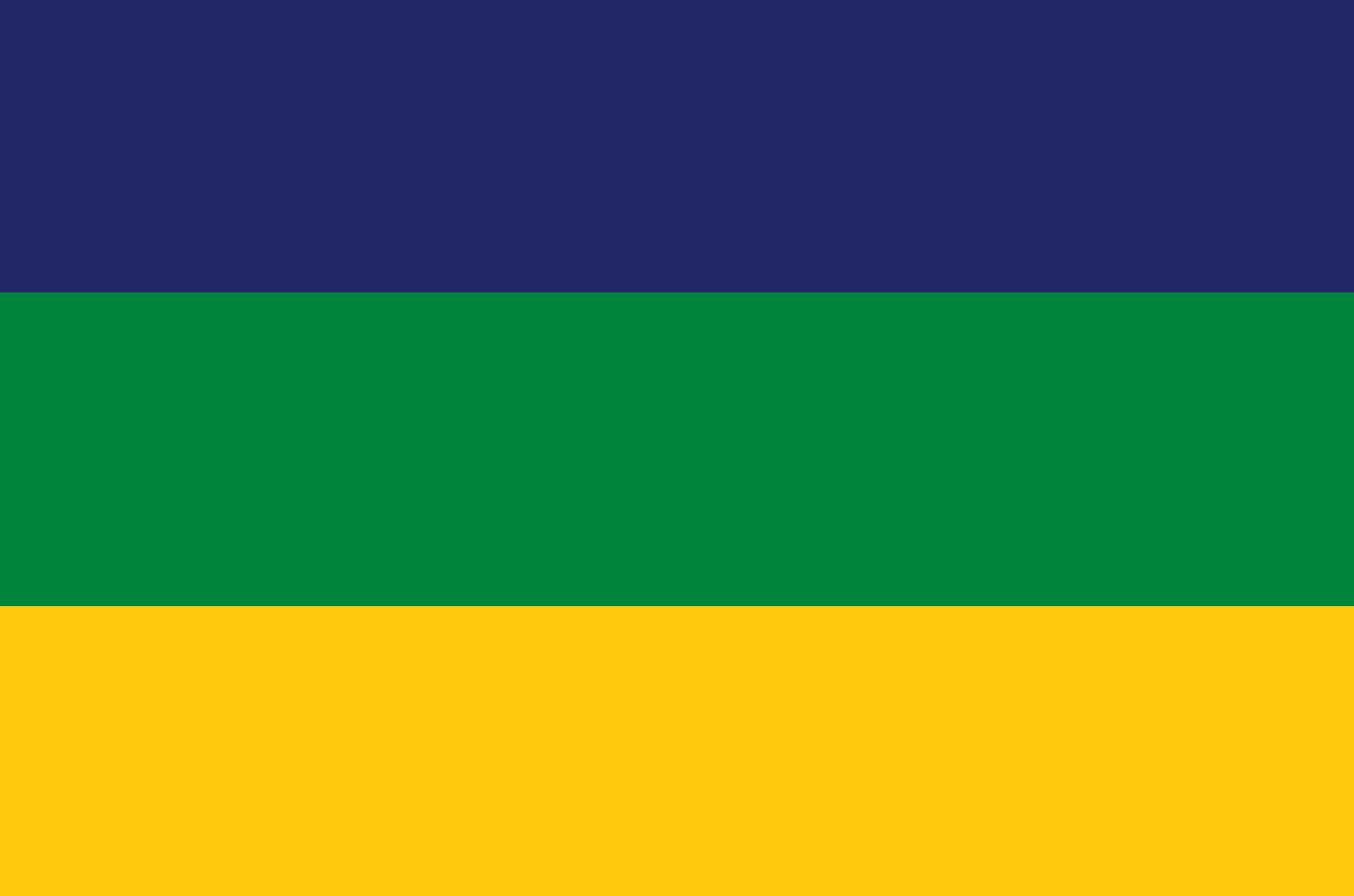
Chincheros

Condorcanqui

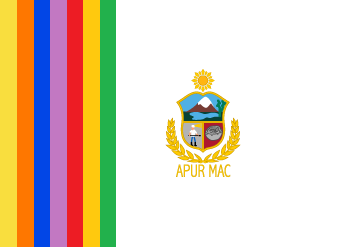
Cotabambas

Cusco

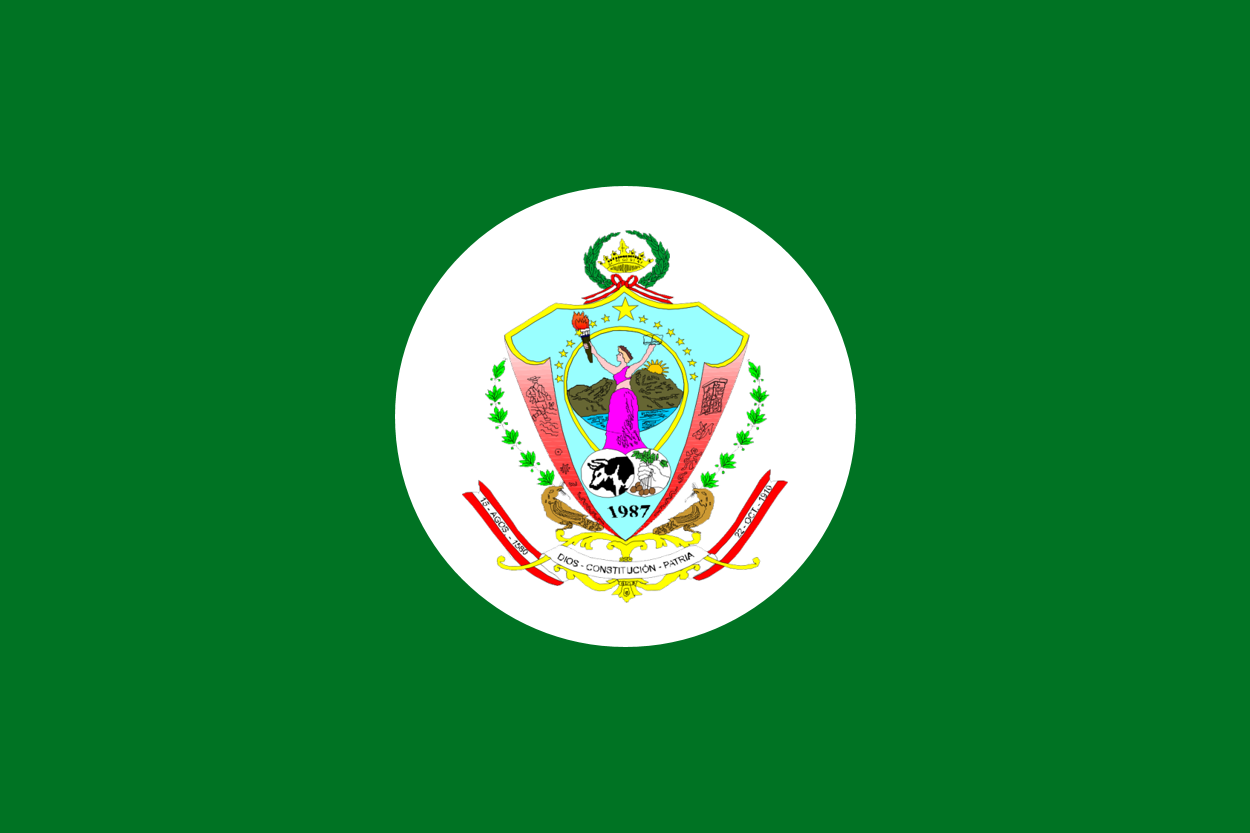
Cutervo

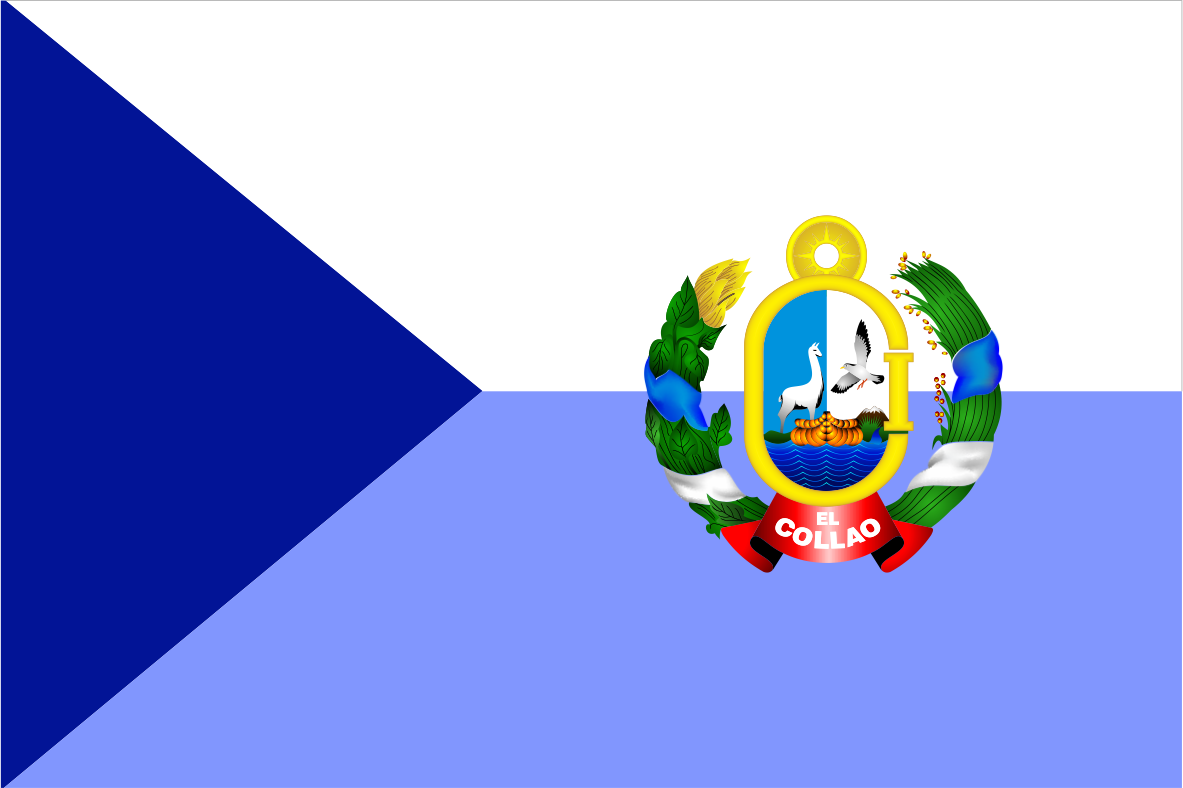
El Collao

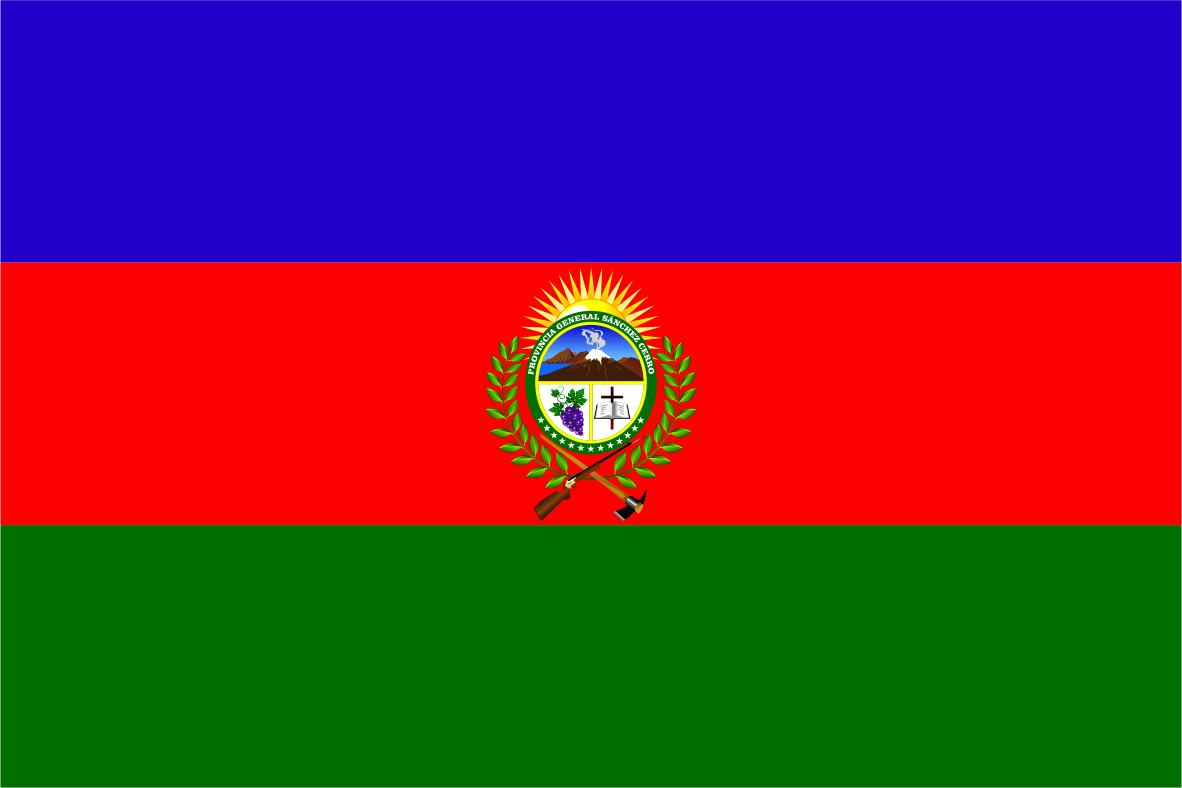
General Sánchez Cerro

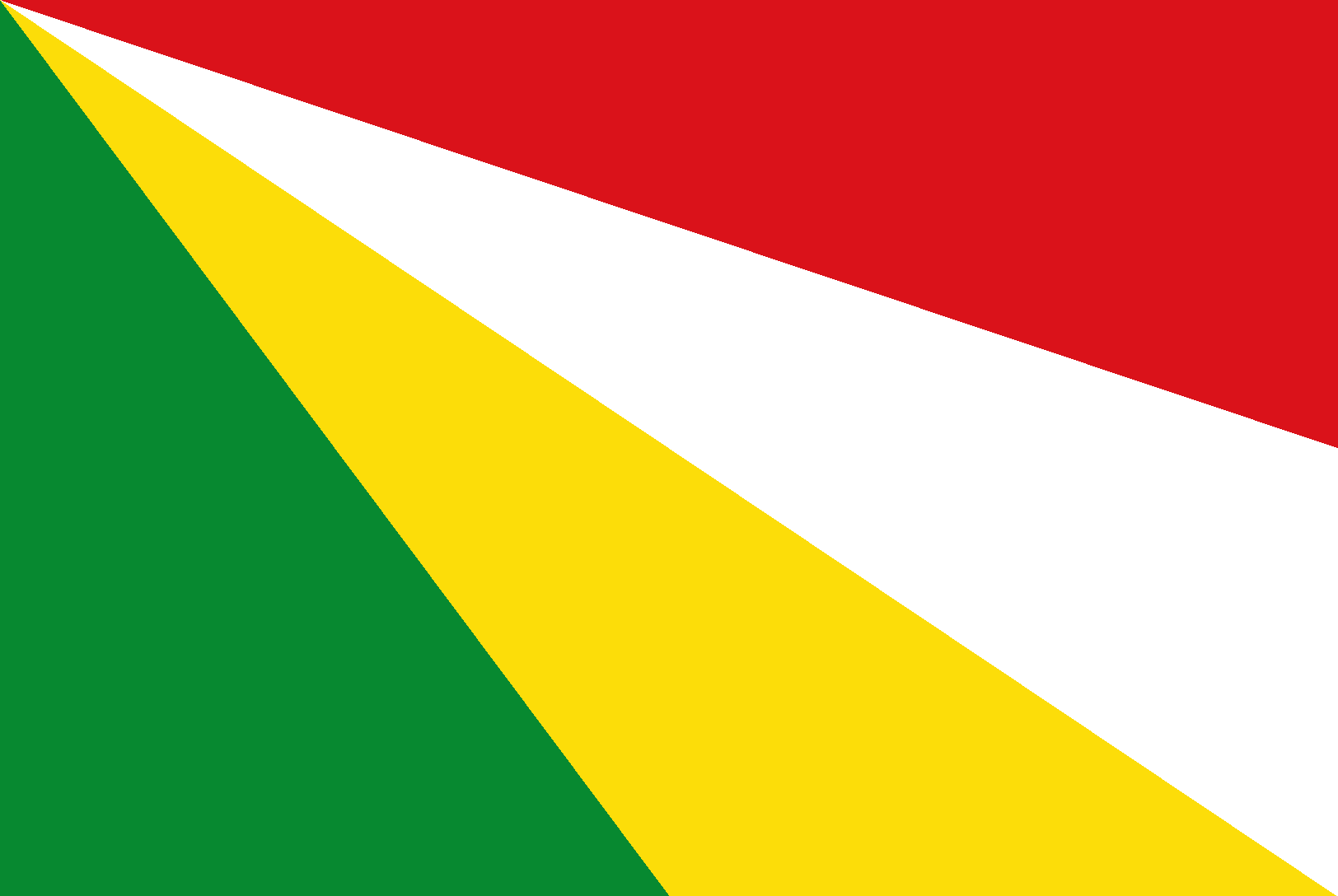
Grau

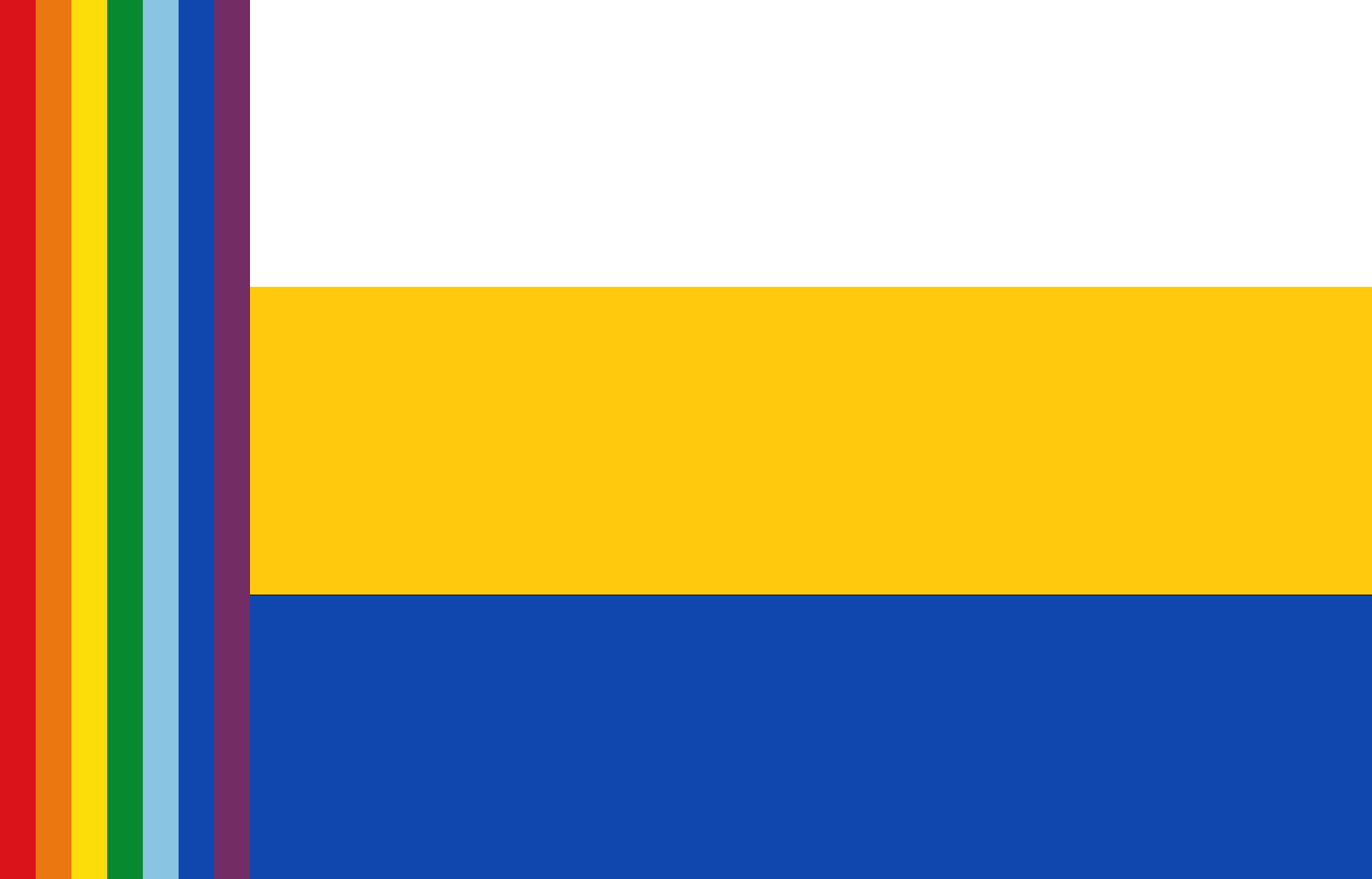
Espinar

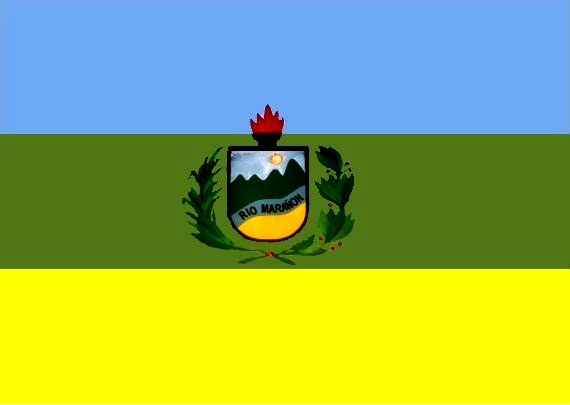
Huacaybamba

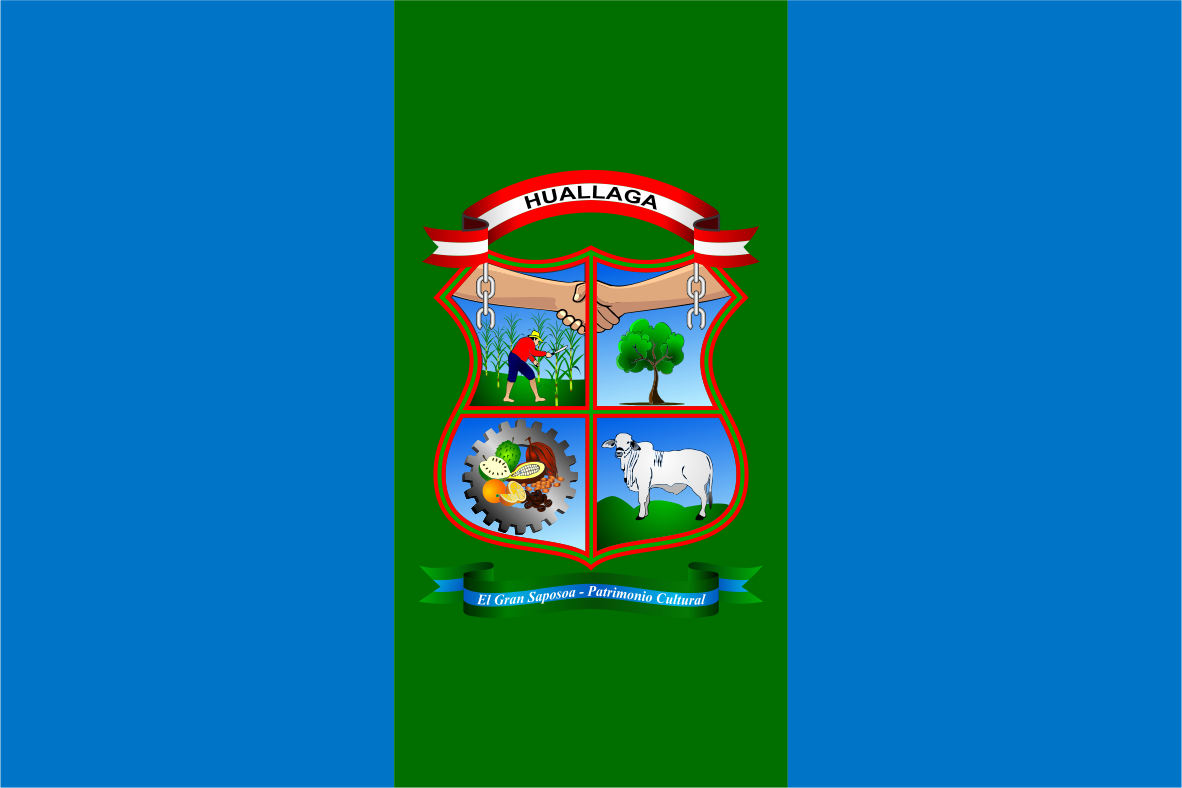
Huallaga

Huamanga

Huanta

Huancavelica

Huancayo

Huánuco

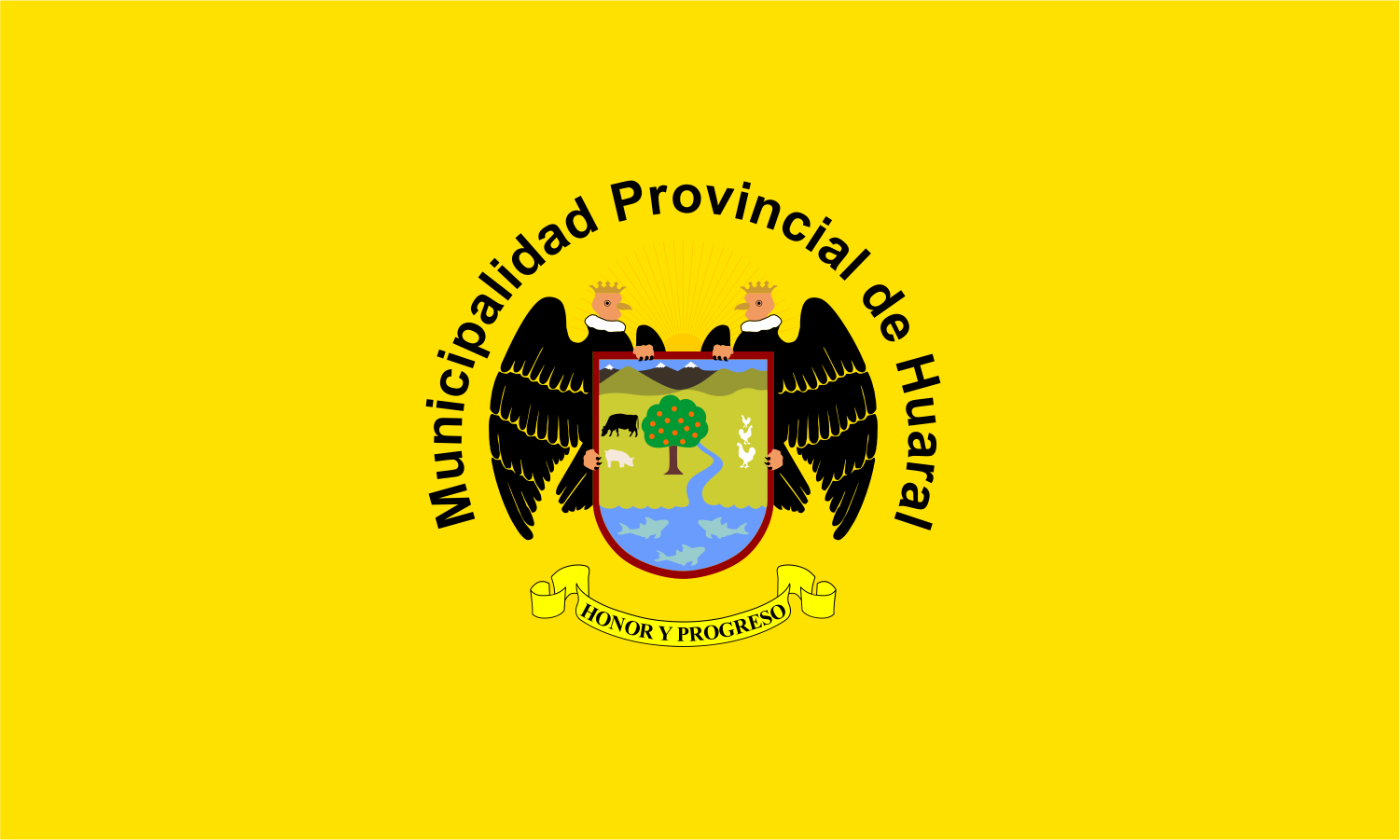
Huaral

Huaraz

Huari

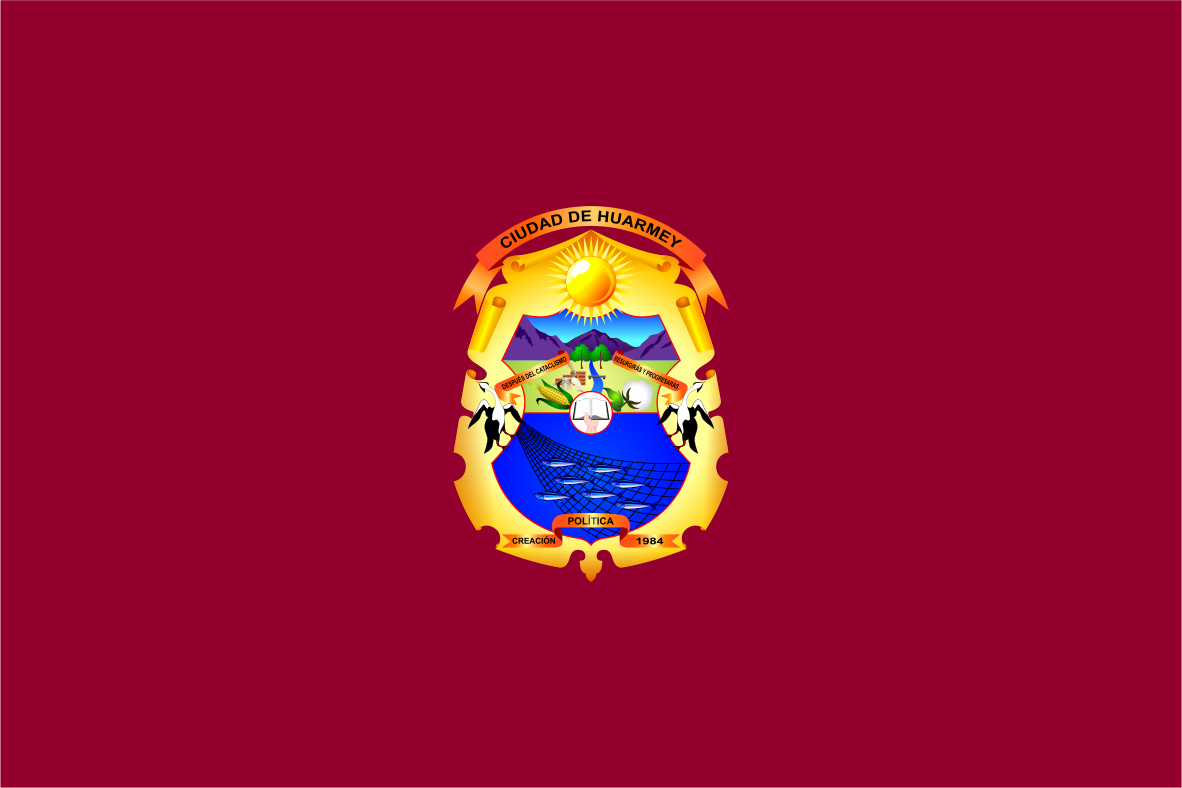
Huarmey

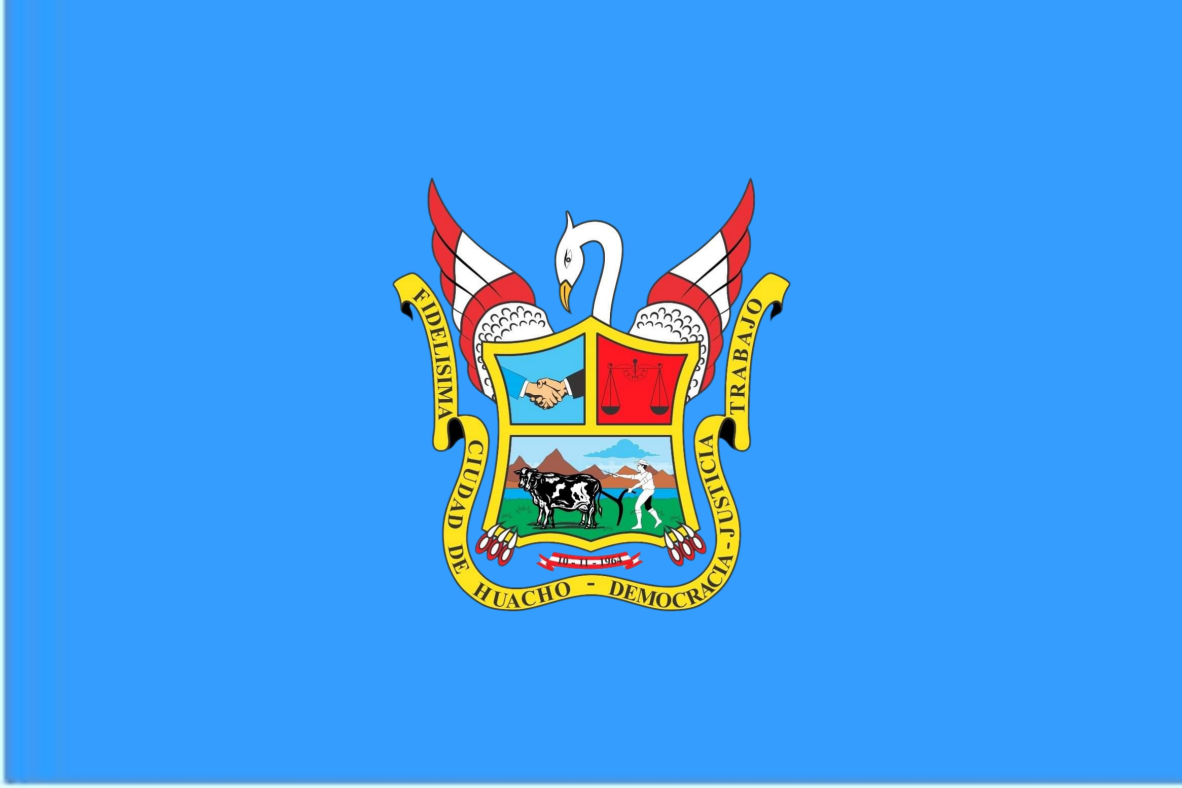
Huaura

Huaylas

Ica

Ilo

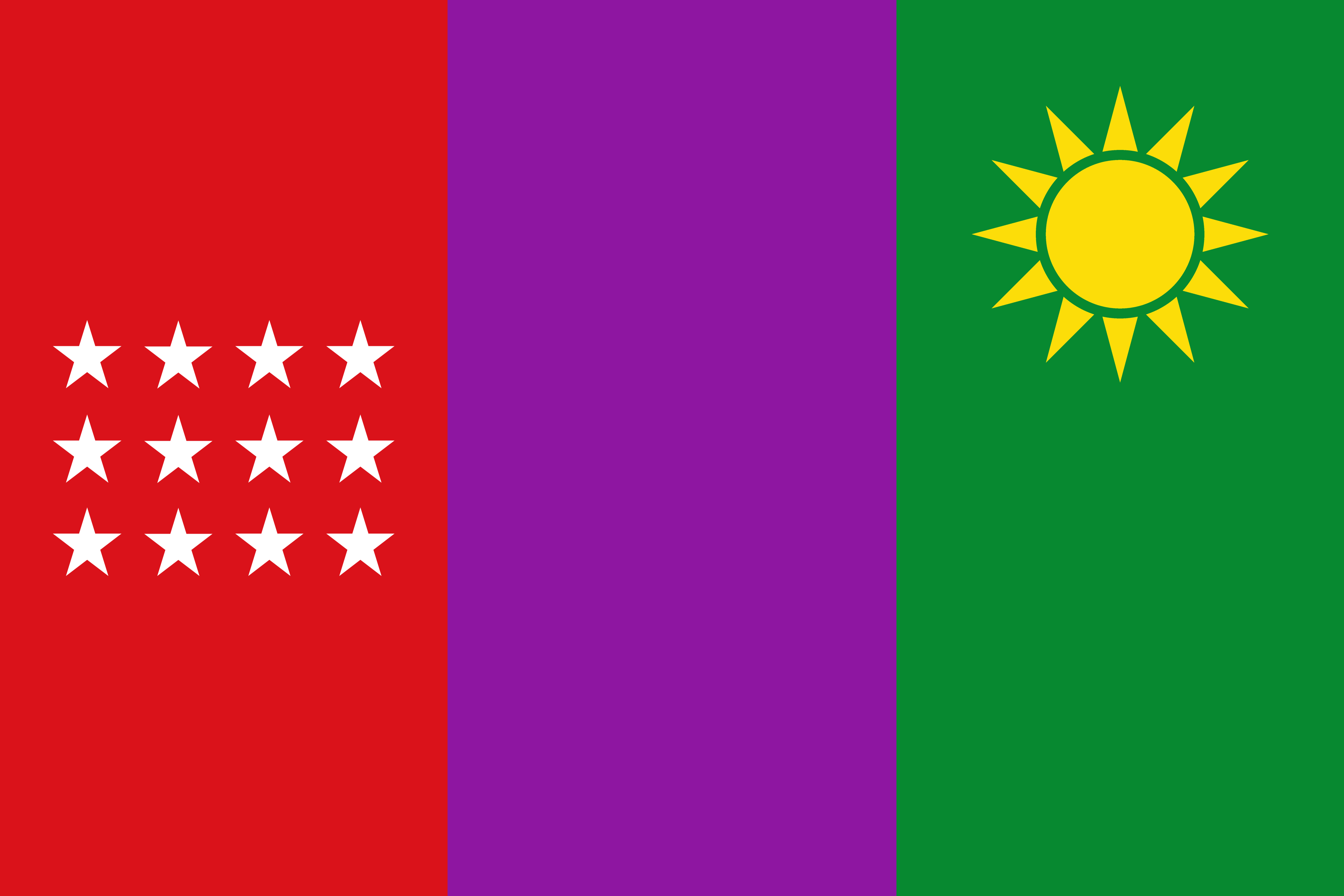
Jaén

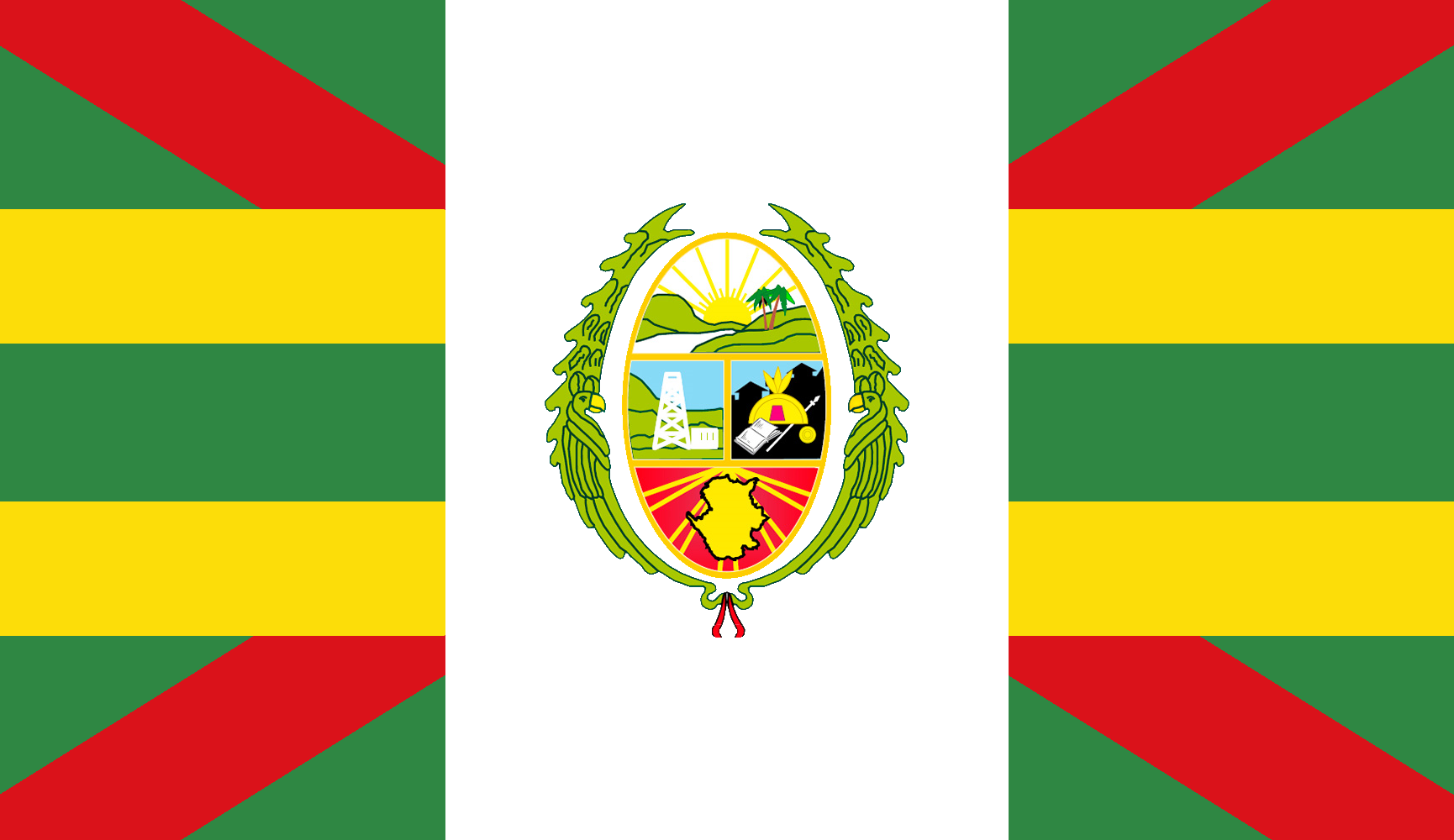
La Convención

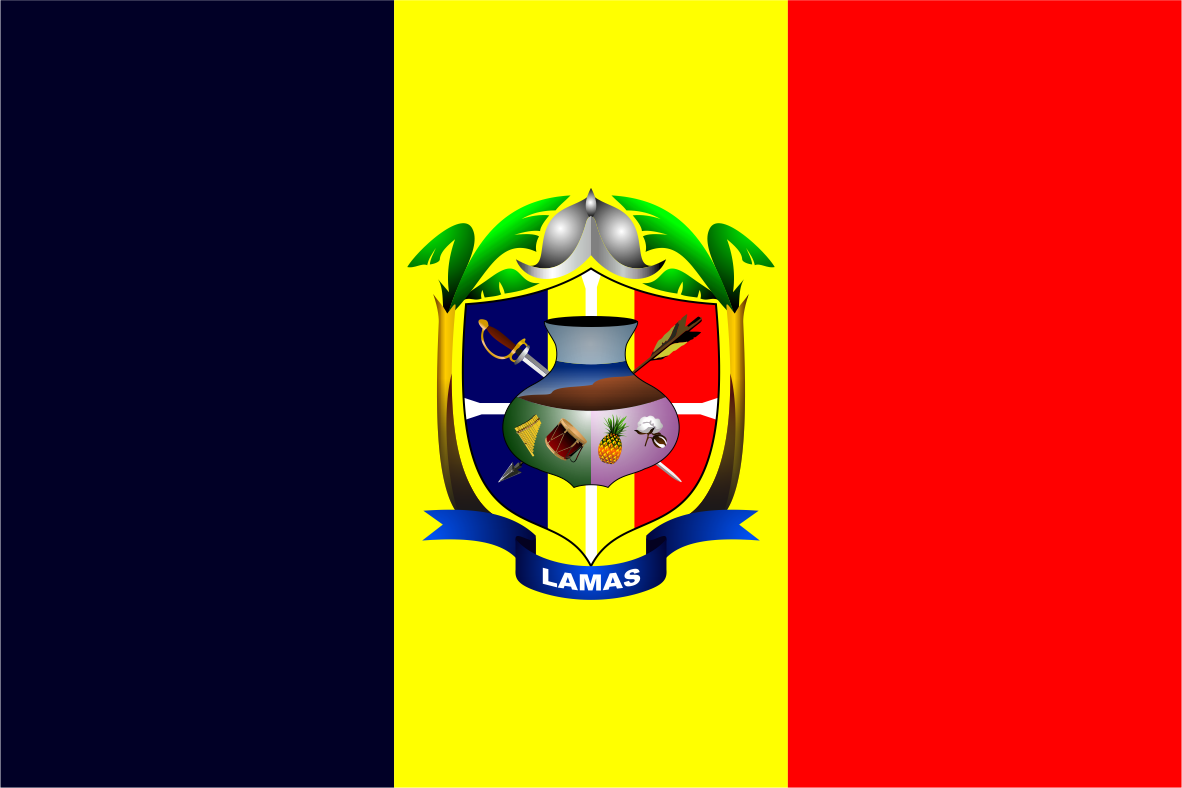
Lamas

Lauricocha

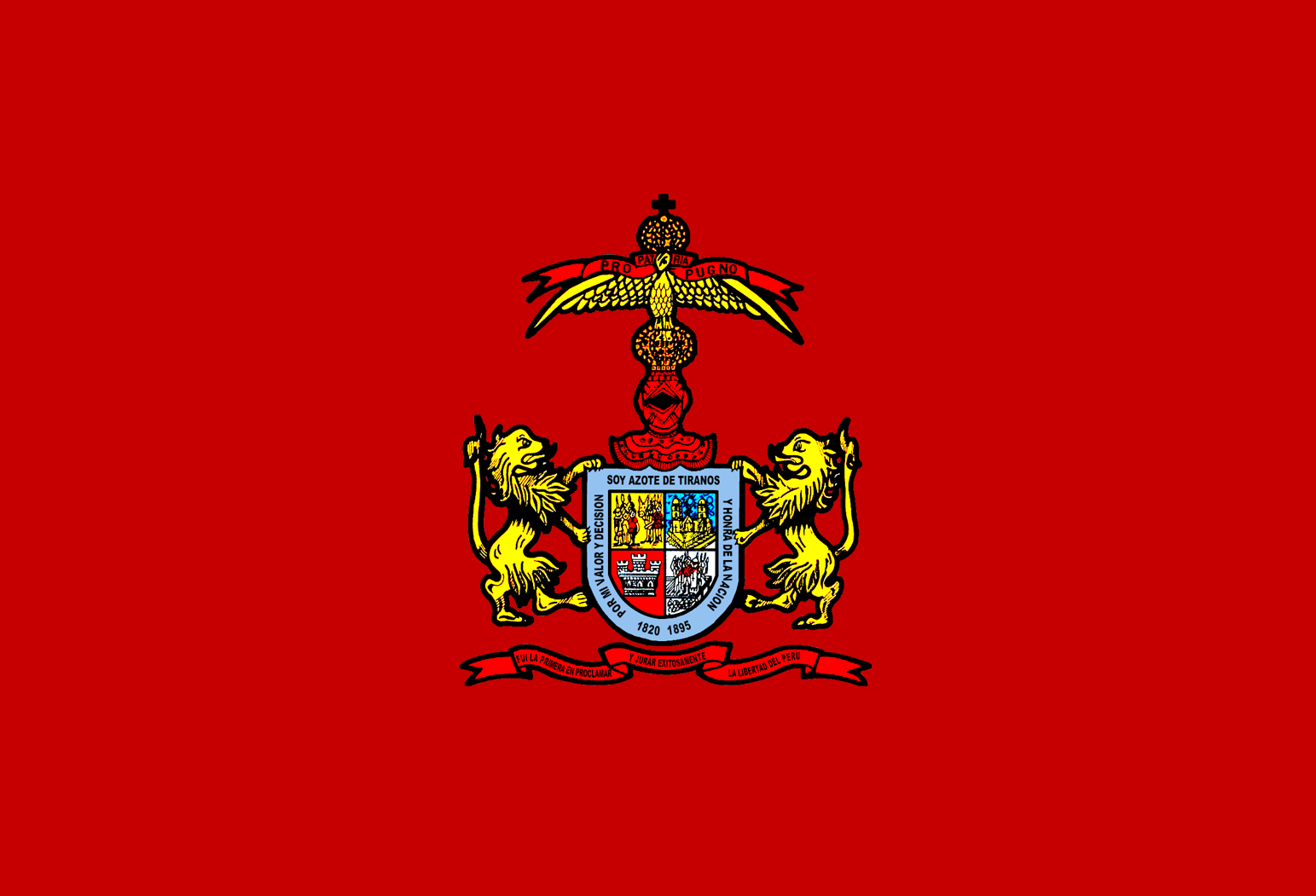
Lambayeque

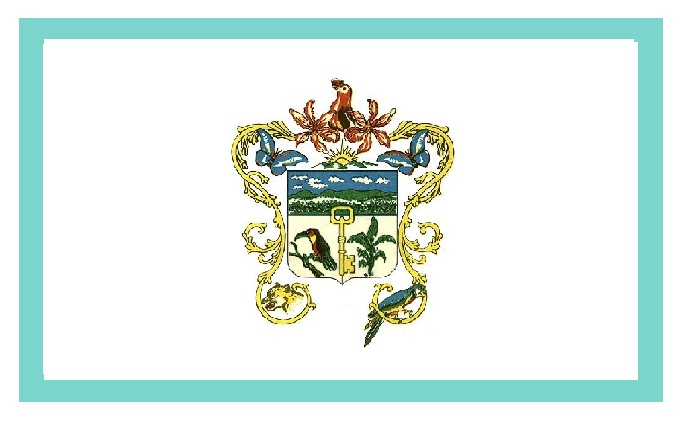
Leoncio Prado

Lima

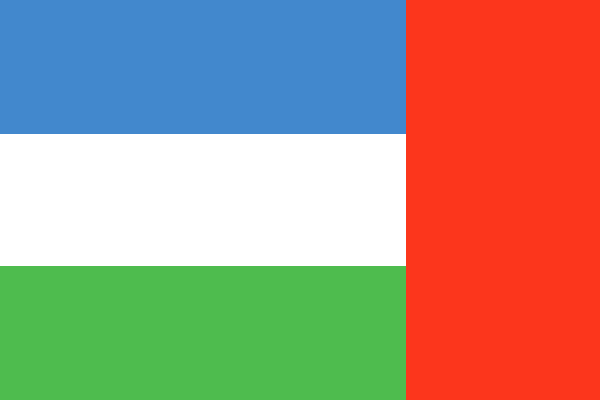
Luya

Mariscal Nieto

Morropón

Moyobamba

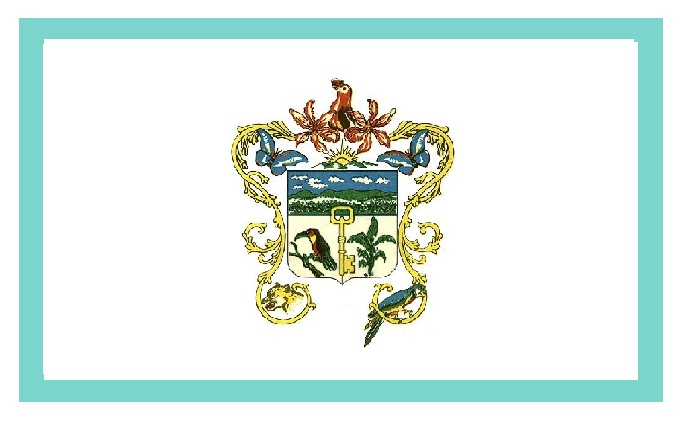
Moyobamba

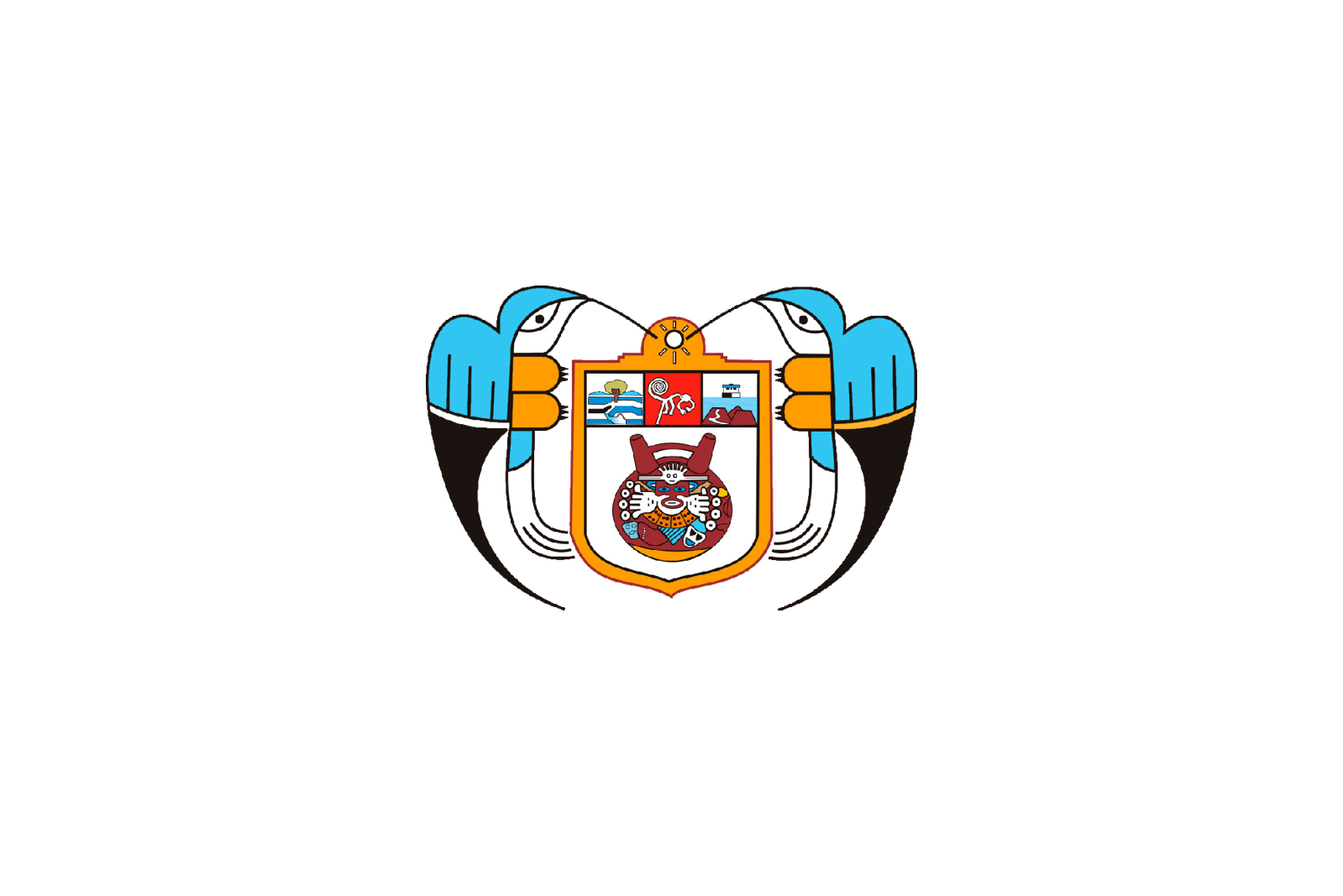
Nazca

Oxapampa

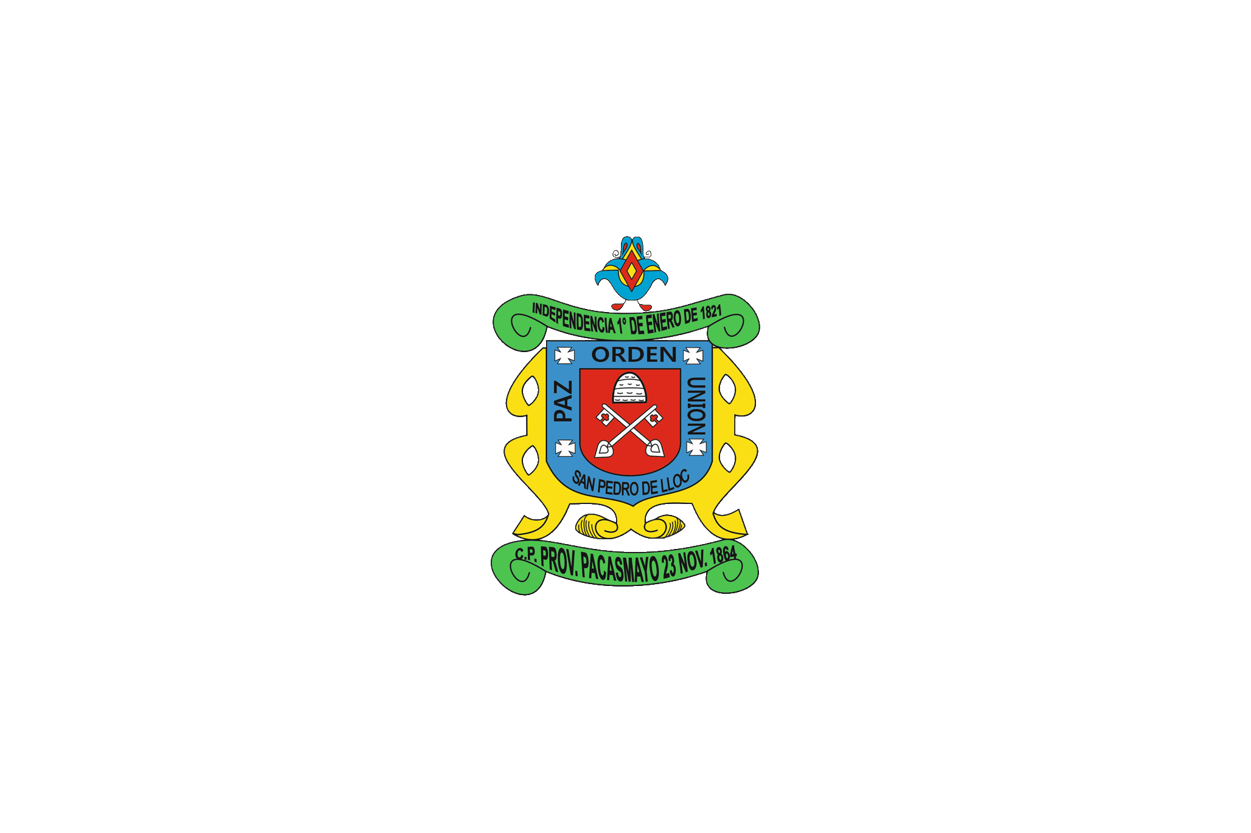
Pacasmayo

Paita

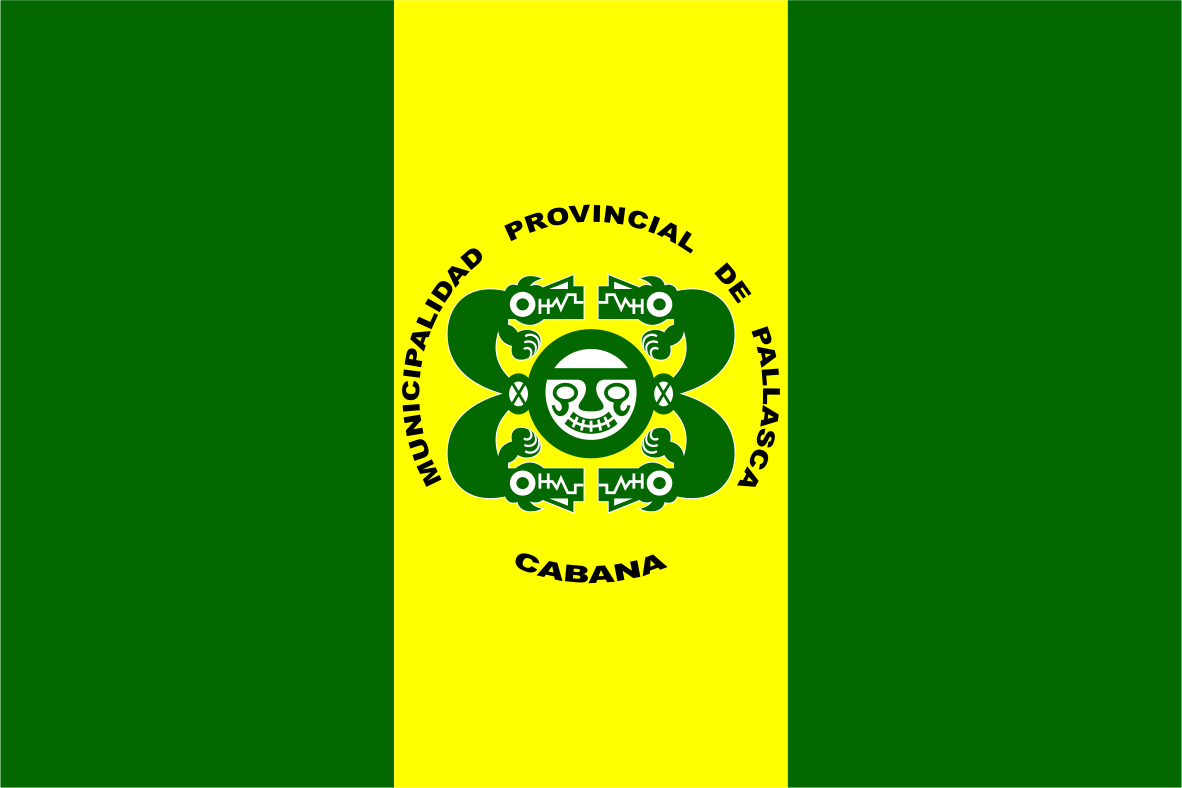
Pallasca

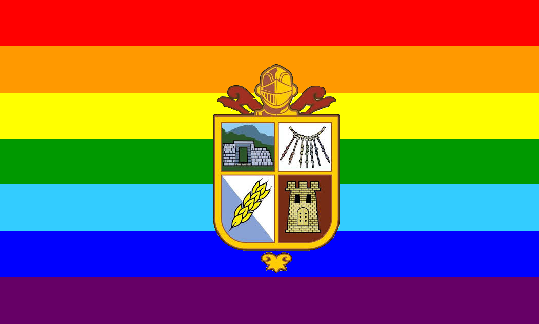
Paruro

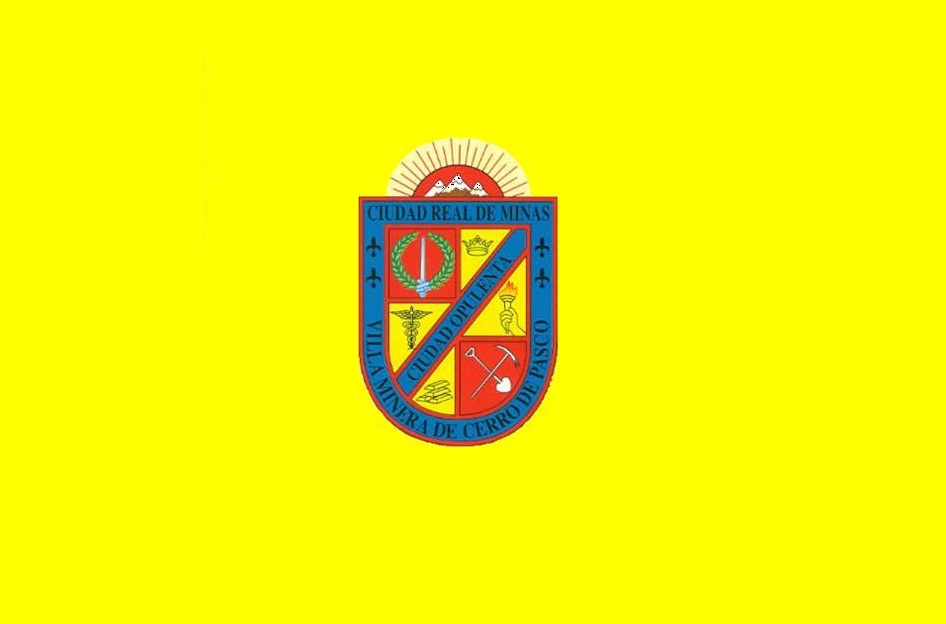
Pasco

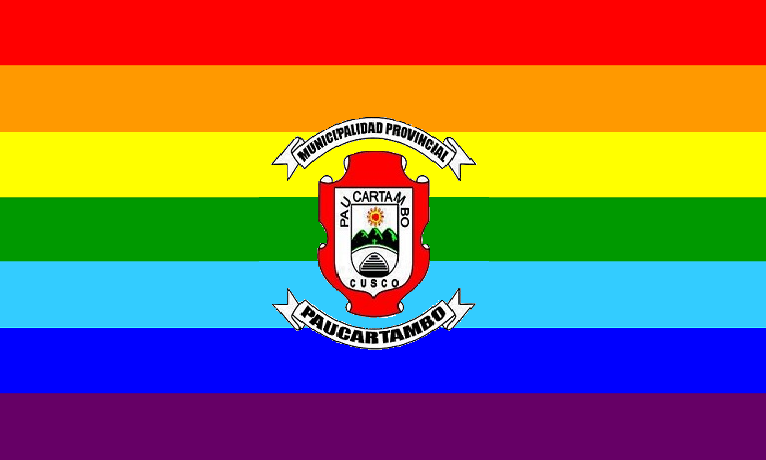
Paucartambo

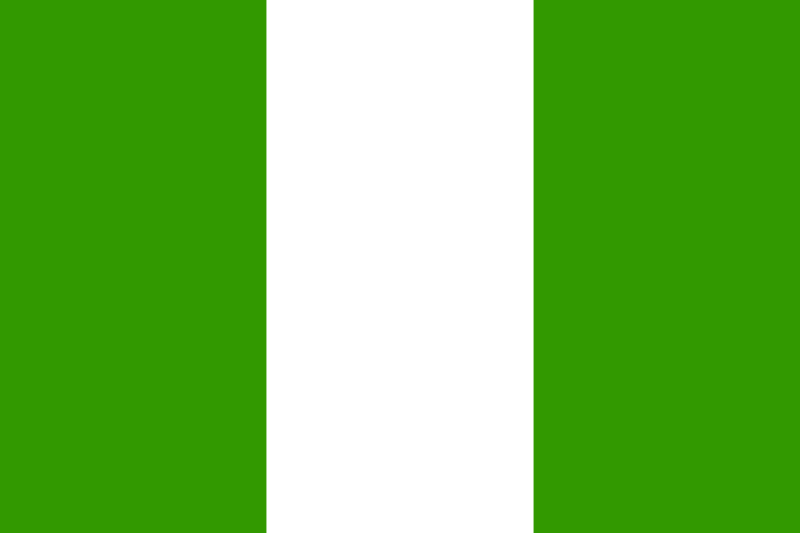
Picota

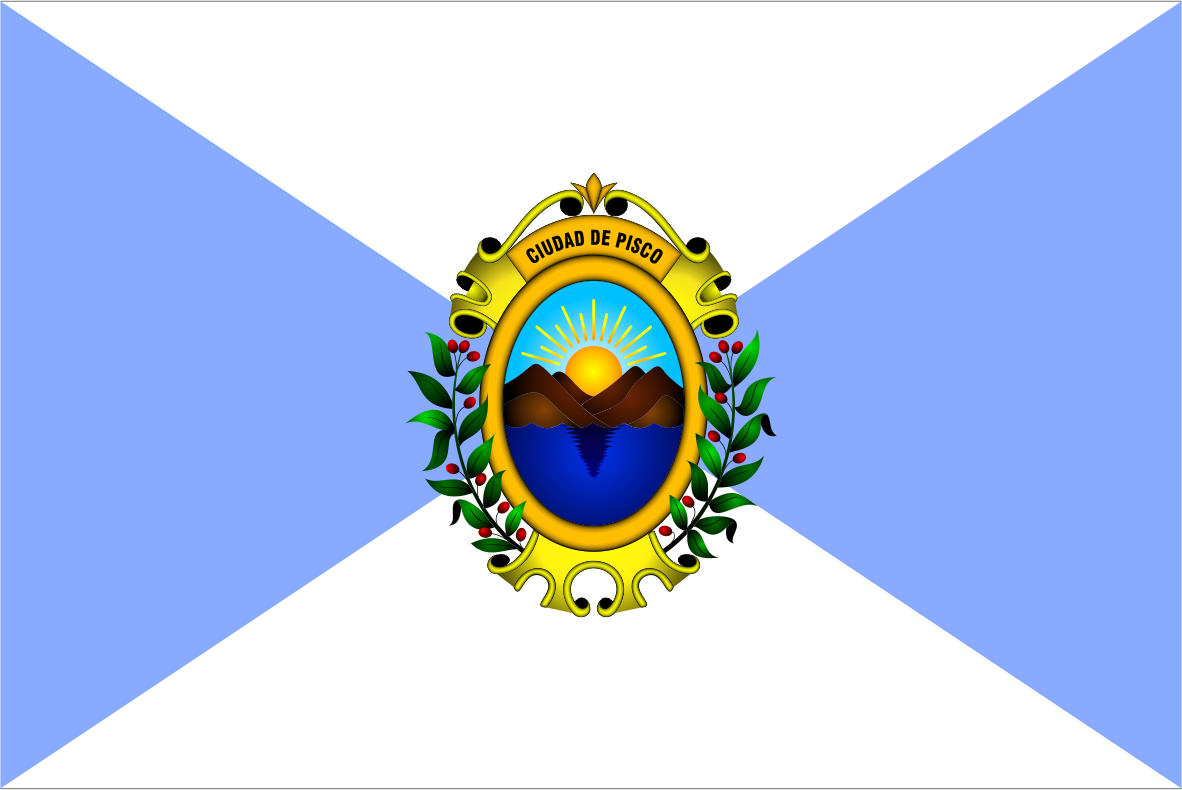
Pisco

Paita

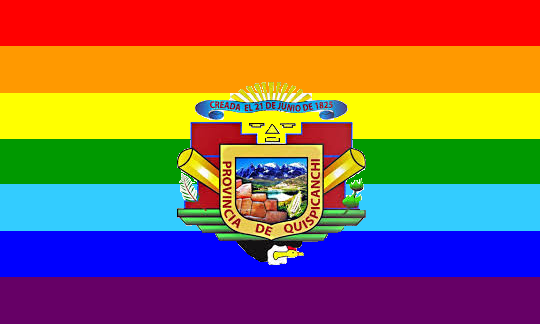
Quispicanchi

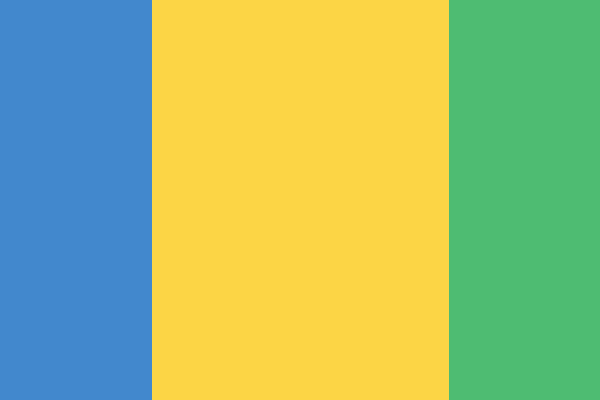
Rodríguez de Mendoza

Sánchez Carrión

San Ignacio

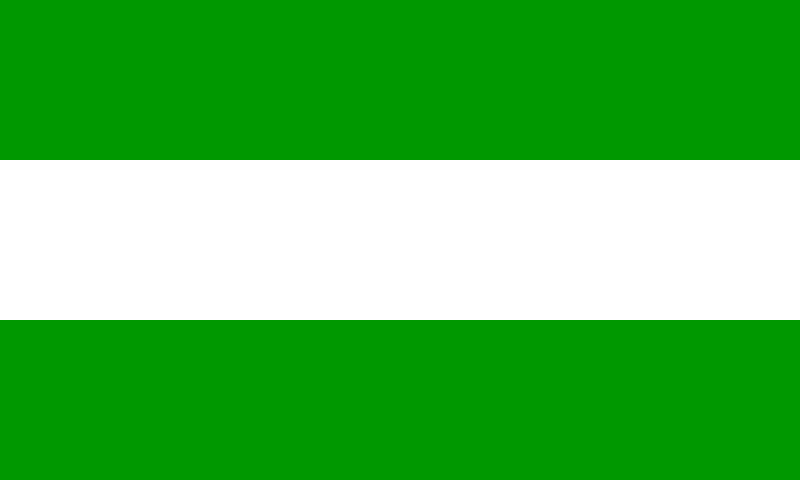
San Martín

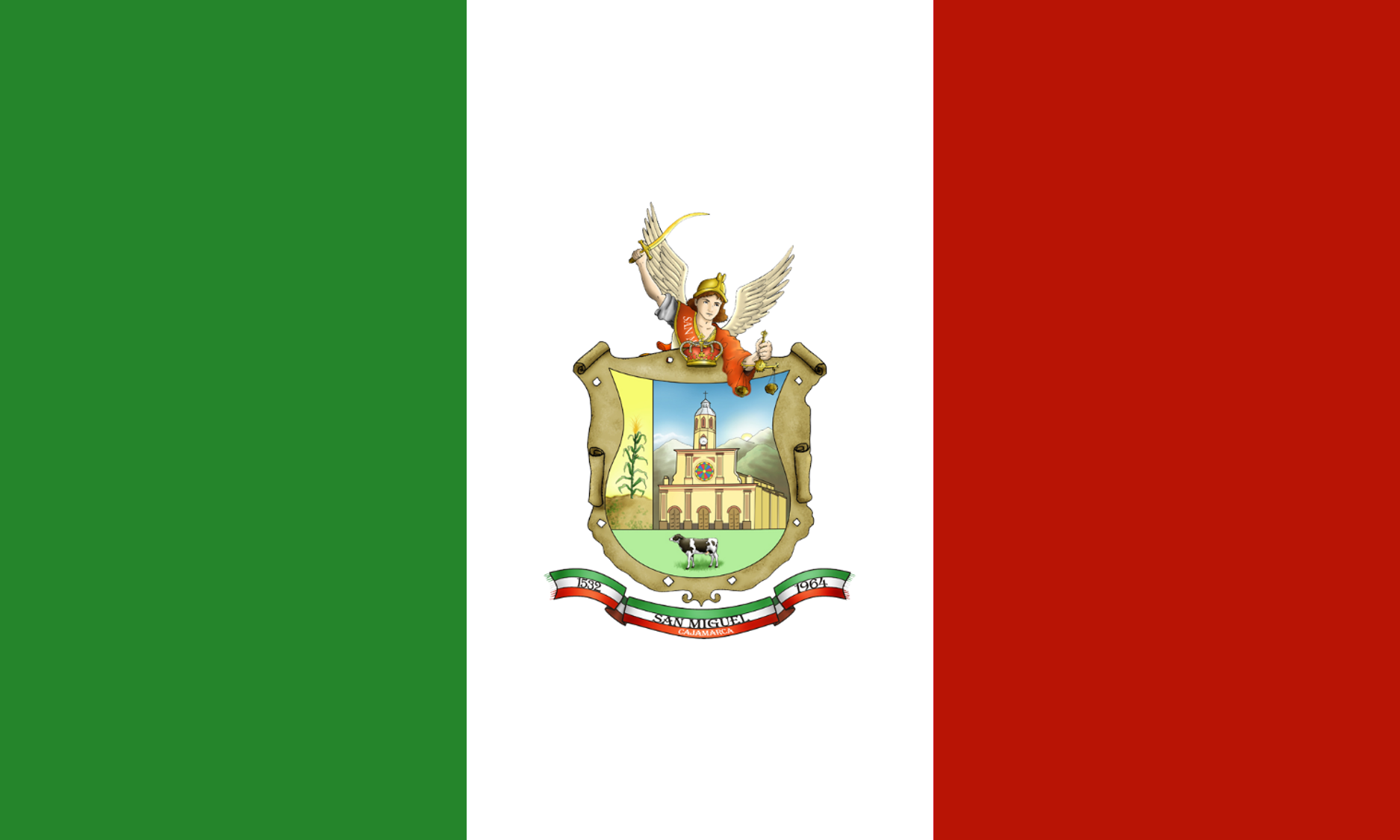
San Miguel

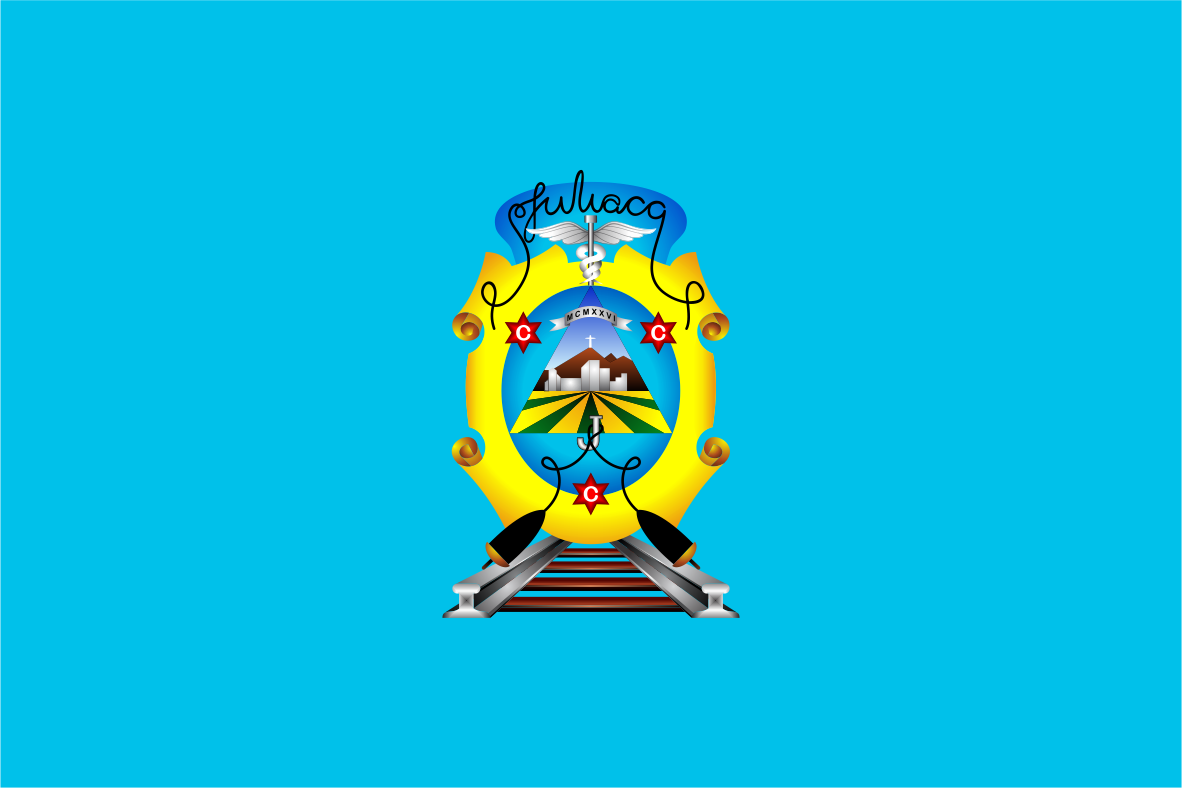
San Román

Santa

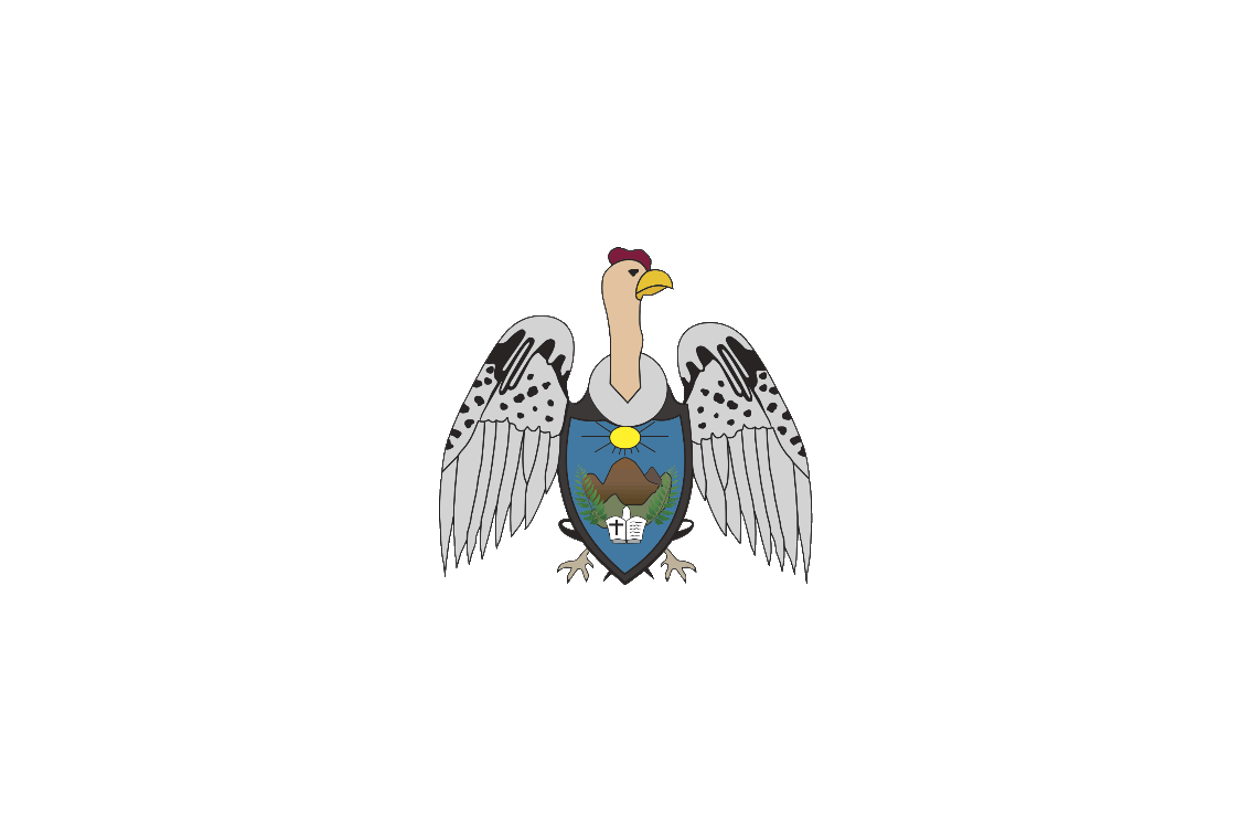
Santiago de Chuco

Sechura

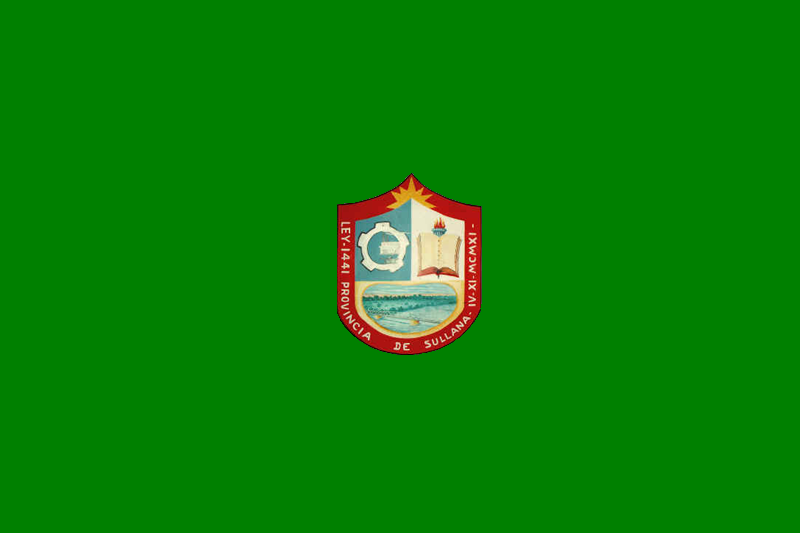
Sullana

Tarma

Trujillo

Tumbes

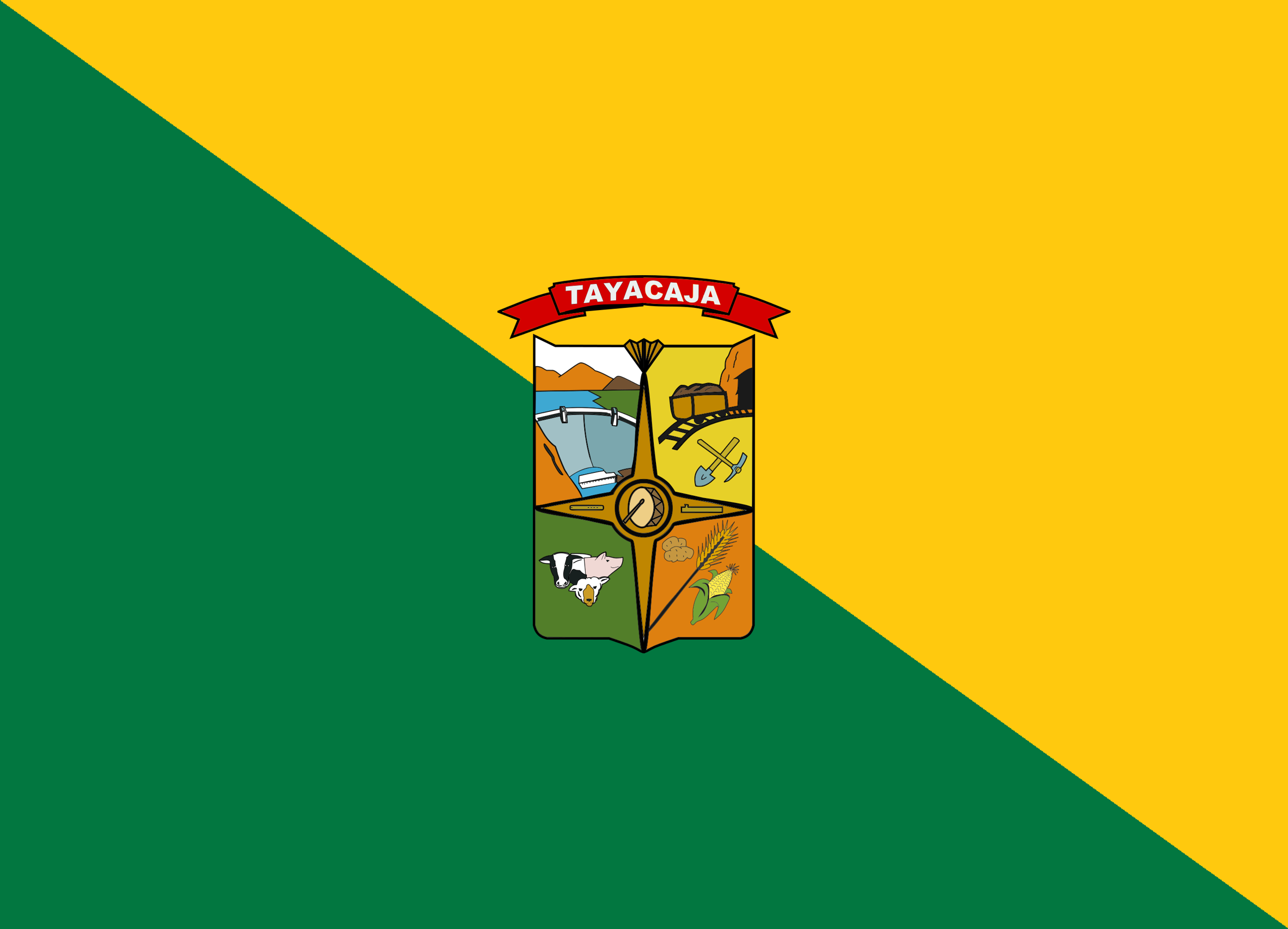
Tayacaja

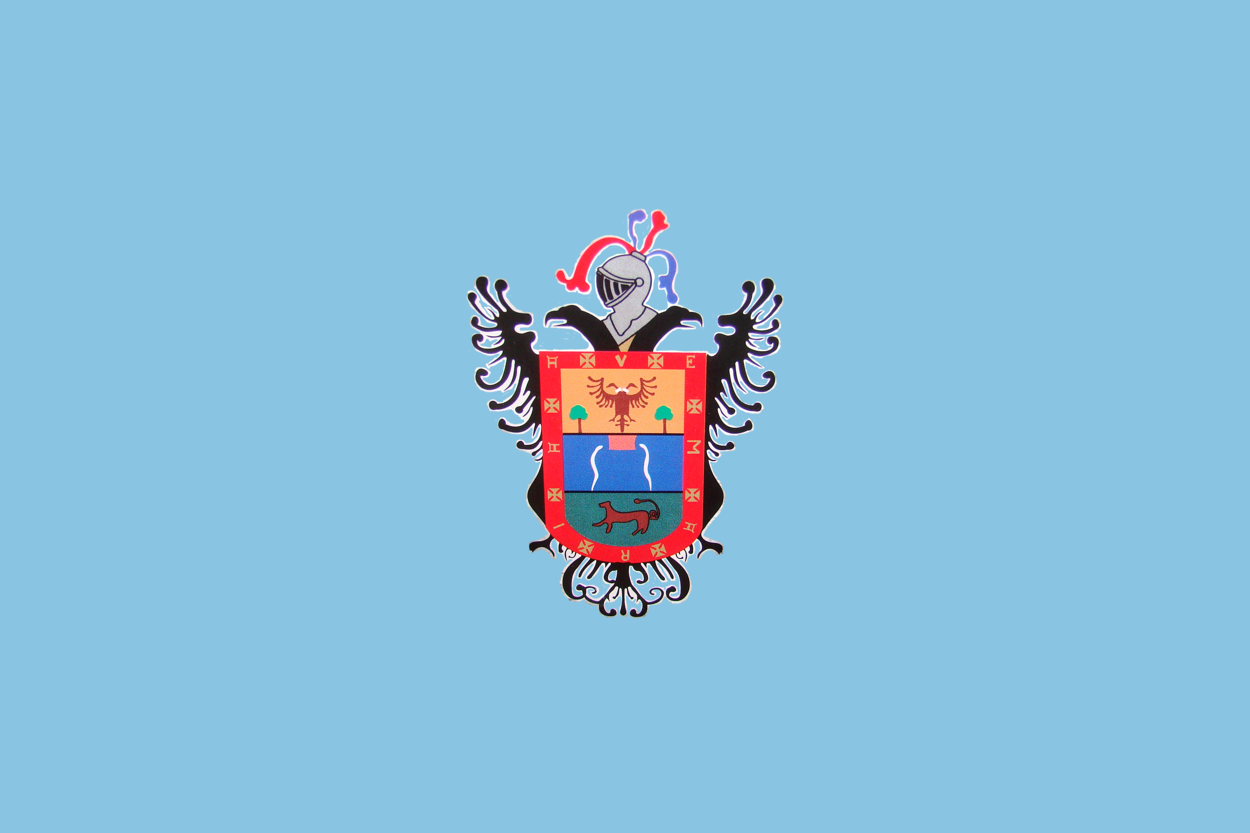
Urubamba

Utcubamba

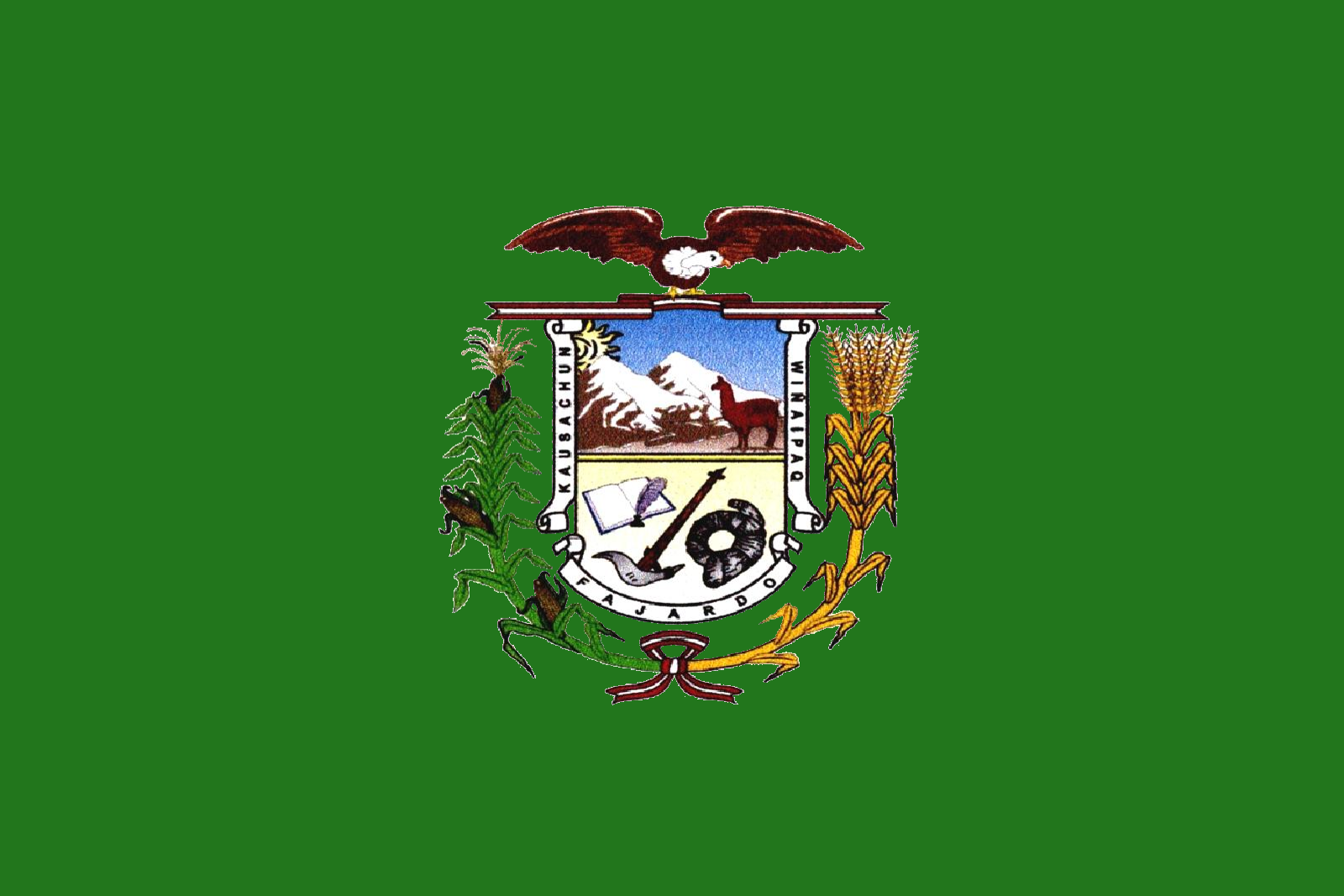
Victor Fajardo

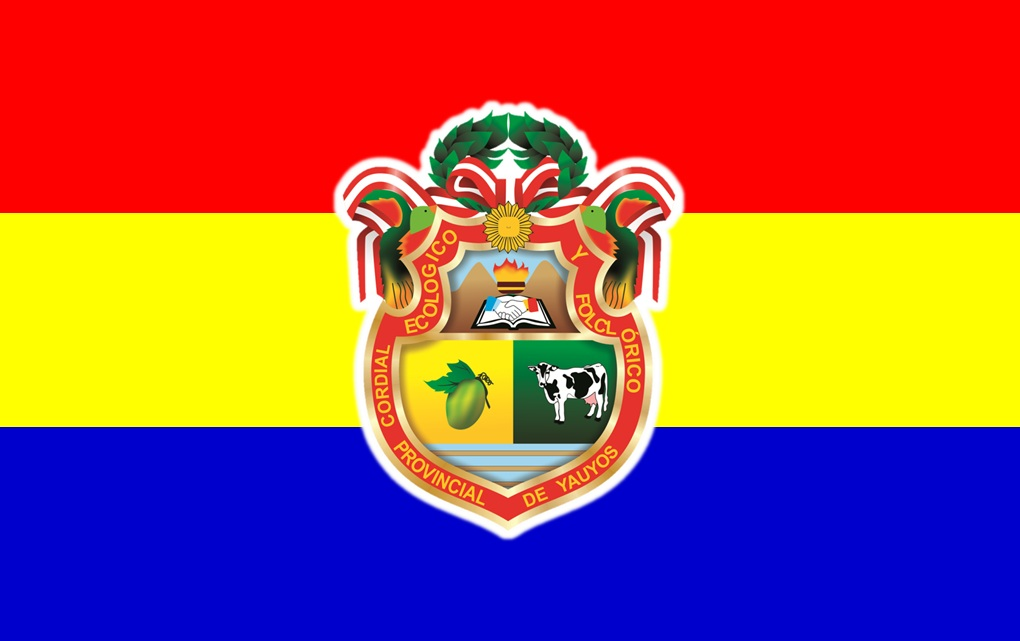
Yauyos

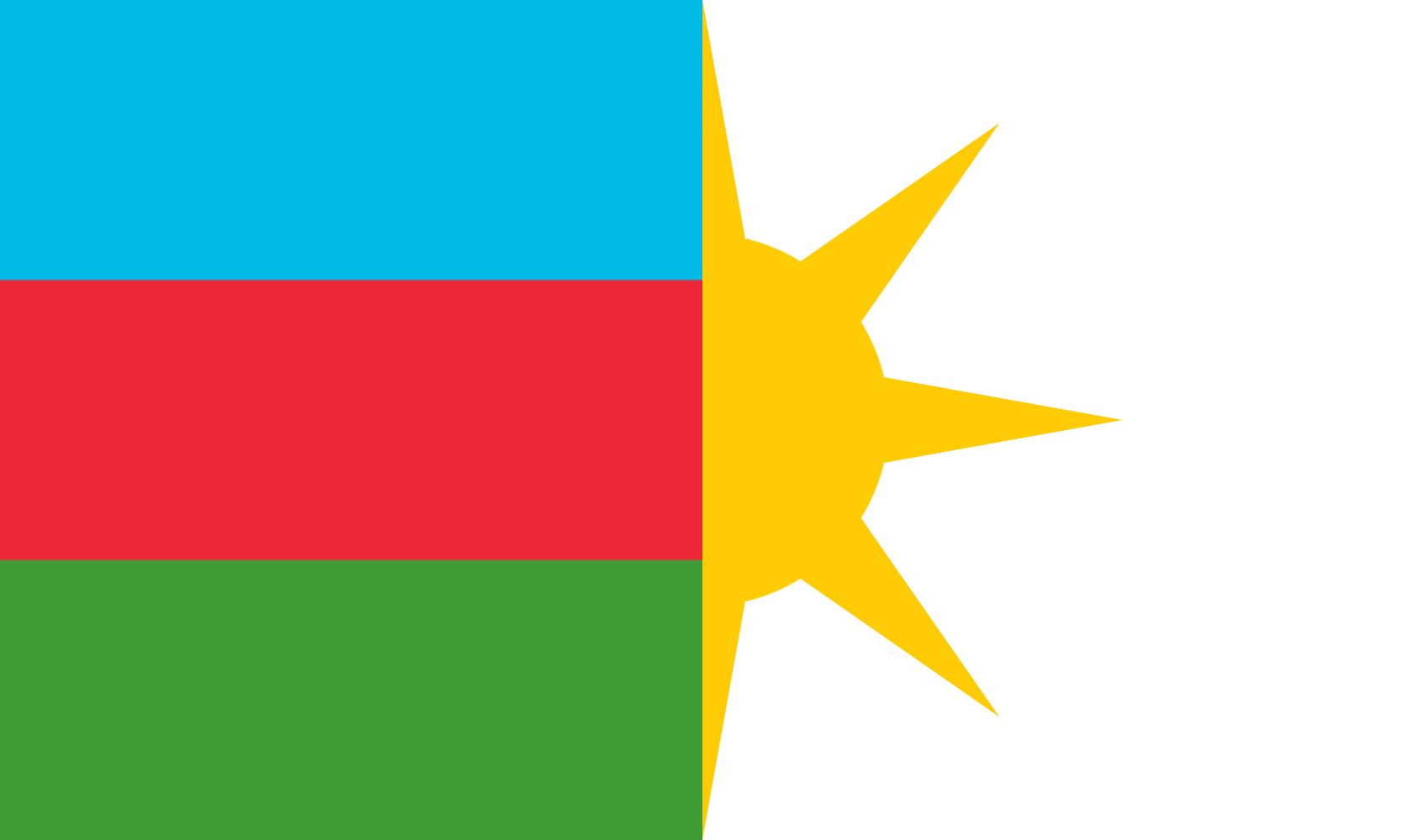
Zarumilla

== Cities ==
Flag	Date	Use	Description
		Flag of Lima, Peru's capital city.	
		Flag of Arequipa, capital of the Arequipa Region	
		Flag of Ayacucho, capital of the Ayacucho Region	
		Flag of Chachapoyas, capital of the Amazonas Region	
		Flag of Chimbote, the largest city in the Ancash Region	
		Flag of Cajamarca, capital of the Cajamarca Region	
		Flag of Cusco, capital of the Cusco Region	
		Flag of Huánuco, capital of the Huánuco Region	
		Flag of Huancavelica, capital of the Huancavelica Region	
		Flag of Huancayo, capital of the Junín Region	
		Flag of Trujillo, capital of the La Libertad Region	
		Flag of Iquitos, capital of the Loreto Region	
		Flag of Moquegua, capital of the Moquegua Region	
		Flag of Piura, capital of the Piura Region	
		Flag of Puno, capital of the Puno Region	
		Flag of Tacna, capital of the Tacna Region	
		Flag of Tumbes, capital of the Tumbes Region	

== Burgees of Peru ==
Flag	Date	Use	Description
		Burgee of the Club de Regatas Lima	
		Burgee of the Yacht Club Ancón	
		Burgee of the Yacht Club Peruano	

== See also ==
- Coat of arms of Peru
- National Anthem of Peru
- Vexillology
