= Uruguay at the 2025 World Aquatics Championships =

- Flag of Uruguay
- World Aquatics code: URU
- National federation: Federación Uruguaya de Natación
- Website: fun.org.uy (in Spanish)

in Singapore
- Competitors: 7 in 3 sports
- Medals: Gold 0 Silver 0 Bronze 0 Total 0

World Aquatics Championships appearances
- 1973; 1975; 1978; 1982; 1986; 1991; 1994; 1998; 2001; 2003; 2005; 2007; 2009; 2011; 2013; 2015; 2017; 2019; 2022; 2023; 2024; 2025

Uruguay competed at the 2025 World Aquatics Championships in Singapore from July 11 to August 3, 2025.

== Competitors ==
The following is the list of competitors in the Championships.

Sport	Men	Women	Total
Artistic swimming	0	2	2
Open water swimming	0	1	1
Swimming	2	2	4
Total	2	5	7

== Artistic swimming ==
Women

Athlete	Event	Preliminaries		Final	
Athlete	Event	Points	Rank	Points	Rank
Agustina Medina	Solo technical routine	189.2041	28	Did not advance	
Lucía Ververis	Solo free routine	149.0163	23	Did not advance	
Agustina Medina; Lucía Ververis	Duet technical routine	215.8466	29	Did not advance	
Agustina Medina; Lucía Ververis	Duet free routine	197.2808	23	Did not advance	

== Open water swimming ==
Women

Athlete	Event	Heat		Semi-final		Final	
Athlete	Event	Time	Rank	Time	Rank	Time	Rank
Pilar Cañedo	Women's 3 km knockout sprints	19:20.8	22	Did not advance			
Pilar Cañedo	Women's 5 km	—				1:09:57.8	46
Pilar Cañedo	Women's 10 km	—				2:31:46.5	51

== Swimming ==
Uruguay entered 4 swimmers.

Men

Athlete	Event	Heat		Semi-final		Final	
Athlete	Event	Time	Rank	Time	Rank	Time	Rank
Lucas de los Santos	200 m freestyle	1:56.34	50	Did not advance			
Lucas de los Santos	100 m butterfly	56.53	60	Did not advance			
Leo Nolles	50 m freestyle	22.60	45	Did not advance			
Leo Nolles	100 m freestyle	50.04	42	Did not advance			

Women

Athlete	Event	Heat		Semi-final		Final	
Athlete	Event	Time	Rank	Time	Rank	Time	Rank
Abril Aunchayna	50 m backstroke	30.43	42	Did not advance			
Abril Aunchayna	100 m backstroke	1:05.15	42	Did not advance			
Nicole Frank	100 m breaststroke	1:12.18	46	Did not advance			
Nicole Frank	200 m individual medley	2:20.25	33	Did not advance			
