= Uruguay at the 2013 World Aquatics Championships =

- Flag of Uruguay
- World Aquatics code: URU
- National federation: Federacíon Uruguaya de Natacíon

in Barcelona, Spain
- Competitors: 4 in 1 sports
- Medals: Gold 0 Silver 0 Bronze 0 Total 0

World Aquatics Championships appearances
- 1973; 1975; 1978; 1982; 1986; 1991; 1994; 1998; 2001; 2003; 2005; 2007; 2009; 2011; 2013; 2015; 2017; 2019; 2022; 2023; 2024; 2025

Uruguay is competing at the 2013 World Aquatics Championships in Barcelona, Spain from 19 July to 4 August 2013.

== Swimming ==
Uruguay has qualified the following four swimmers:

Men

| Athlete | Event | Heat | | Semifinal | | Final | |
| Athlete | Event | Time | Rank | Time | Rank | Time | Rank |
|---|---|---|---|---|---|---|---|
| Enzo Martínez | 100 m freestyle | 51.77 | 45 | did not advance | | | |
| Gabriel Melconian | 50 m butterfly | 25.08 | 47 | did not advance | | | |
| Gabriel Melconian | 50 m freestyle | 23.11 | 42 | did not advance | | | |
| Martín Melconian | 50 m breaststroke | 28.21 | 40 | did not advance | | | |
| Martín Melconian | 100 m breaststroke | 1:05.90 | 58 | did not advance | | | |

Women

| Athlete | Event | Heat | | Semifinal | | Final | |
| Athlete | Event | Time | Rank | Time | Rank | Time | Rank |
|---|---|---|---|---|---|---|---|
| Inés Remersaro | 100 m backstroke | 1:06.70 | 41 | did not advance | | | |
| Inés Remersaro | 200 m backstroke | 2:24.15 | 33 | did not advance | | | |
