= Uruguay at the 2015 World Aquatics Championships =

- Flag of Uruguay
- World Aquatics code: URU
- National federation: Federacíon Uruguaya de Natacíon

in Kazan, Russia
- Competitors: 4 in 1 sport
- Medals: Gold 0 Silver 0 Bronze 0 Total 0

World Aquatics Championships appearances
- 1973; 1975; 1978; 1982; 1986; 1991; 1994; 1998; 2001; 2003; 2005; 2007; 2009; 2011; 2013; 2015; 2017; 2019; 2022; 2023; 2024; 2025

Uruguay competed at the 2015 World Aquatics Championships in Kazan, Russia from 24 July to 9 August 2015.

== Swimming ==
Uruguayan swimmers have achieved qualifying standards in the following events (up to a maximum of 2 swimmers in each event at the A-standard entry time, and 1 at the B-standard):

Men

| Athlete | Event | Heat | | Semifinal | | Final | |
| Athlete | Event | Time | Rank | Time | Rank | Time | Rank |
|---|---|---|---|---|---|---|---|
| Gabriel Melconian | 50 m freestyle | 23.73 | 51 | did not advance | | | |
| Martín Melconian | 50 m breaststroke | 28.53 | 39 | did not advance | | | |

Women

| Athlete | Event | Heat | | Semifinal | | Final | |
| Athlete | Event | Time | Rank | Time | Rank | Time | Rank |
|---|---|---|---|---|---|---|---|
| Inés Remersaro | 100 m backstroke | 1:04.73 | 47 | did not advance | | | |
| Inés Remersaro | 200 m backstroke | 2:20.55 | 40 | did not advance | | | |
| Sofía Usher | 50 m freestyle | 27.93 | 69 | did not advance | | | |
| Sofía Usher | 100 m freestyle | 1:00.64 | 71 | did not advance | | | |
