= Uruguay at the 2017 World Aquatics Championships =

- Flag of Uruguay
- FINA code: URU
- National federation: Federacíon Uruguaya de Natacíon

in Budapest, Hungary
- Competitors: 4 in 1 sport
- Medals: Gold 0 Silver 0 Bronze 0 Total 0

World Aquatics Championships appearances
- 1973; 1975; 1978; 1982; 1986; 1991; 1994; 1998; 2001; 2003; 2005; 2007; 2009; 2011; 2013; 2015; 2017; 2019; 2022; 2023; 2024

Uruguay competed at the 2017 World Aquatics Championships in Budapest, Hungary from 14 July to 30 July.

== Swimming ==
Uruguayan swimmers have achieved qualifying standards in the following events (up to a maximum of 2 swimmers in each event at the A-standard entry time, and 1 at the B-standard):

Athlete	Event	Heat		Semifinal		Final	
Athlete	Event	Time	Rank	Time	Rank	Time	Rank
Enzo Martínez	Men's 50 m freestyle	23.30	=59	did not advance			
Enzo Martínez	Men's 100 m freestyle	51.39	63	did not advance			
Martín Melconian	Men's 50 m breaststroke	28.10	35	did not advance			
Santiago Saint-Upery	Men's 100 m breaststroke	1:05.30	59	did not advance			
Santiago Saint-Upery	Men's 200 m breaststroke	2:26.35	38	did not advance			
Inés Remersaro	Women's 50 m freestyle	26.59	43	did not advance			
Inés Remersaro	Women's 100 m freestyle	58.27	43	did not advance			
