= Uruguay at the 2011 World Aquatics Championships =

- Flag of Uruguay
- World Aquatics code: URU
- National federation: Federacíon Uruguaya de Natacíon

in Shanghai, China
- Competitors: 3 in 1 sports
- Medals: Gold 0 Silver 0 Bronze 0 Total 0

World Aquatics Championships appearances
- 1973; 1975; 1978; 1982; 1986; 1991; 1994; 1998; 2001; 2003; 2005; 2007; 2009; 2011; 2013; 2015; 2017; 2019; 2022; 2023; 2024; 2025

Uruguay competed at the 2011 World Aquatics Championships in Shanghai, China between July 16 and 31, 2011.

== Swimming ==
Uruguay qualified 3 swimmers.

Men

Athlete	Event	Heats		Semifinals		Final	
Athlete	Event	Time	Rank	Time	Rank	Time	Rank
Gabriel Melconian	Men's 100m Freestyle	50.34	41	did not advance			
Martin Kutscher	Men's 200m Freestyle	1:52.49	41	did not advance			

Women

Athlete	Event	Heats		Semifinals		Final	
Athlete	Event	Time	Rank	Time	Rank	Time	Rank
Ines Remarsaro	Women's 100m Backstroke	1:05.73	47	did not advance			
Ines Remarsaro	Women's 200m Backstroke	2:21.07	35	did not advance			
