= List of Uruguayan records in swimming =

The Uruguayan records in swimming are the fastest ever performances of swimmers from Uruguay, which are recognised and ratified by the Uruguayan Swimming Federation: Federación Uruguaya de Natación (FUN).

All records were set in finals unless noted otherwise.

== Long course (50 m) ==
=== Men ===
Event	Time		Name	Club	Date	Meet	Location	Ref
50 m freestyle	22.12	tt	Diego Aranda	Campus de Maldonado	29 March 2025	Segundo Open	Maldonado, Uruguay	
100 m freestyle	49.70		Martín Kutscher	Uruguay	19 July 2007	Pan American Games	Rio de Janeiro, Brazil	
200 m freestyle	1:49.48	h	Martín Kutscher	VFL Sindelfingen	26 June 2009	German Championships	Berlin, Germany	
400 m freestyle	3:54.36	b	Carlos Scanavino	Uruguay	23 September 1988	Olympic Games	Seoul, South Korea	
800 m freestyle	8:14.49		Carlos Scanavino	Uruguay	28 August 1987	-	Indianapolis, United States	
1500 m freestyle	15:29.78	h	Carlos Scanavino	Uruguay	4 August 1984	Olympic Games	Los Angeles, United States	
50 m backstroke	26.54		Leo Nolles	Club Biguá de Villa Biarritz	29 November 2025	Uruguayan Championships	Maldonado, Uruguay	
100 m backstroke	58.18	=	Diego Gallo	Uruguay	17 September 2000	Olympic Games	Sydney, Australia	
100 m backstroke	58.18	r, =	Juan Ignacio Saint-Upéry	Club Biguá de Villa Biarritz	3 October 2025	Uruguayan Junior Championships	Maldonado, Uruguay	
200 m backstroke	2:07.26	h	Gonzalo De Leon	Berkeley Aquatic	7 August 2007	US Junior Championships	Indianapolis, United States	
50 m breaststroke	27.56		Martin Melconian	Club Bigua de Villa Biarritz	29 November 2019	Uruguayan Championships	Maldonado, Uruguay	
100 m breaststroke	1:01.89	h	Martin Melconian	Uruguay	6 August 2019	Pan American Games	Lima, Peru	
200 m breaststroke	2:17.53		Colton Milne	TSM Aquatics	28 July 2021 (Note: 1 August 2021 by FUN source, probably a typo)	Futures Championships	Santa Clarita, United States	
50 m butterfly	24.58		Rodrigo Cáceres	-	24 August 2009	Chilean Championships	Santiago, Chile	
100 m butterfly	55.26	h	Javier Golovchenko	Uruguay	24 July 1996	Olympic Games	Atlanta, United States	
200 m butterfly	2:02.89		Joel Romeu	-	29 April 2011	-	Mar del Plata, Argentina	
200m individual medley	2:04.44		Lucas Young	Bolles School Sharks	1 August 2026	Futures Championships	Austin, United States	
400m individual medley	4:29.07		Colton Milne	TSM Aquatics	27 July 2021	Futures Championships	Santa Clarita, United States	
4×100m freestyle relay	3:21.06		Gabriel Melconian (50.72); Paul Kutscher (50.20); Martín Kutscher (49.78); Francisco Picasso (50.36)	Uruguay	20 July 2007	Pan American Games	Rio de Janeiro, Brazil	
4×200m freestyle relay	7:50.02		Diego Martínez; Alvaro Goyenola; Germán De Giobbi; Carlos Scanavino	-	22 March 1990	-	Rosario, Argentina	
4×100m medley relay	3:50.00		Nicolas Francia; Martin Melconian; Martin Kutscher; Paul Kutscher	Uruguay	15 March 2008	South American Championships	São Paulo, Brazil	

Legend: # – Record awaiting ratification by Federación Uruguaya de Natación; WR – World record; AM – Americas record;
Records not set in finals: h – heat; sf – semifinal; r – relay 1st leg; rh – relay heat 1st leg; b – B final; † – en route to final mark; so – swim-off; tt – time trial

=== Women ===
Event	Time		Name	Club	Date	Meet	Location	Ref
50m freestyle	25.64		Angelina Solari	Uruguay	25 April 2025	Brazil Swimming Trophy	Rio de Janeiro, Brazil	
100m freestyle	55.41		Angelina Solari	Uruguay	13 September 2026	South American Games	Santa Fe, Argentina	
200m freestyle	2:04.78		Luna Chabat	CN Antibes	31 May 2024	National Spring Meeting - Southern Region	Aix-en-Provence, France	
400m freestyle	4:24.68	b	Lucia Negro	St Charles	25 July 2025	Futures Championships	Madison, United States	
800m freestyle	9:17.47		Pilar Cañedo	Club Atletico Olimpia	11 April 2026	Torneo Estadual Abierto	Porto Alegre, Brazil	
1500m freestyle	17:38.65		Pilar Cañedo	Club Atletico Olimpia	10 April 2026	Torneo Estadual Abierto	Porto Alegre, Brazil	
50m backstroke	29.07		Abril Aunchayna	Uruguay	13 September 2026	South American Games	Santa Fe, Argentina	
100m backstroke	1:02.80		Abril Aunchayna	Club Bigua de Villa Biarritz	27 April 2023	Argentine Championships	Buenos Aires, Argentina	
200m backstroke	2:19.01		Inés Remersaro	Uruguay	11 June 2014	Mare Nostrum	Canet-en-Roussillon, France	
50m breaststroke	32.09		Abril Allende	Templeogue	22 February 2026	McCullagh International Meet	Dublin, Ireland	
100m breaststroke	1:10.20	h	Nicole Frank	Uruguay	26 November 2021	Junior Pan American Games	Cali, Colombia	
200m breaststroke	2:31.20		Nicole Frank	Azura Florida Aquatics	20 June 2024	Bahamian Championships	Nassau, Bahamas	
50m butterfly	27.08		Angelina Solari	Club Atletico Olimpia	7 May 2025	Argentine Championships	Buenos Aires, Argentina	
100m butterfly	1:02.01		Angelina Solari	Uruguay	17 July 2026	Asunción International Open	Asunción, Paraguay	
200m butterfly	2:21.17		Antonella Scanavino	-	28 March 2009	South American Junior Championships	Mar del Plata, Argentina	
200m individual medley	2:15.66		Nicole Frank	Azura Florida Aquatics	22 June 2024	Bahamian Championships	Nassau, Bahamas	
400m individual medley	4:54.13		Nicole Frank	Azura Florida Aquatics	8 July 2022	Southern Zone South Sectional Championships	Plantation, United States	
4×100m freestyle relay	3:55.64	h	Abril Aunchayna (59.29); Maria Solari (58.92); Nicole Frank (59.70); Luna Chabat (57.73)	Uruguay	21 October 2023	Pan American Games	Santiago, Chile	
4×200m freestyle relay	8:54.55		Taissa Pedreira (2:13.53); Andrea Sanchis (2:12.11); Martina Fuentes (2:16.69); Nicole Frank (2:12.22)	Uruguay	12 April 2019	South American Junior Championships	Santiago, Chile	
4×100m medley relay	4:22.37	h	Abril Aunchayna (1:05.36); Nicole Frank (1:12.53); Maria Solari (1:06.45); Luna Chabat (58.03)	Uruguay	25 October 2023	Pan American Games	Santiago, Chile	

Legend: # – Record awaiting ratification by Federación Uruguaya de Natación; WR – World record; AM – Americas record;
Records not set in finals: h – heat; sf – semifinal; r – relay 1st leg; rh – relay heat 1st leg; b – B final; † – en route to final mark; so – swim-off; tt – time trial

=== Mixed relay ===
Event	Time		Name	Club	Date	Meet	Location	Ref
4×50m freestyle relay	1:43.03		Federico Levy; Ines Remersaro; Ging Fen Lin; Manuel Machado	Club Bigua de Villa Biarritz	November 2017	Uruguayan Championships	Maldonado, Uruguay	
4×100m freestyle relay	3:40.33	h	Leo Nolles (51.49); Diego Aranda (51.38); Maria Solari (59.42); Luna Chabat (58.04)	Uruguay	22 October 2023	Pan American Games	Santiago, Chile	
4×50m medley relay	1:51.93		Fernando Cotelo; Martin Melconian; Ines Remersaro; M. Fuentes	Club Biguá de Villa Biarritz	1 December 2019	-	Uruguay	
4×100m medley relay	4:04.66		Abril Gozategui (1:04.58); Martin Melconian (1:04.26); Luna Chabat (1:04.44); Pedro Stanham (51.38)	Uruguay	5 October 2022	South American Games	Asunción, Paraguay	

Legend: # – Record awaiting ratification by Federacion Uruguaya De Natacion; WR – World record; AM – Americas record;
Records not set in finals: h – heat; so – swim-off

== Short Course (25 m) ==
=== Men ===
Event	Time		Name	Club	Date	Meet	Location	Ref
50m freestyle	21.65		Diego Aranda	Club Bigua de Villa Biarritz	27 June 2026	Uruguayan Championships	Montevideo, Uruguay	
100m freestyle	48.37		Leo Nolles	Club Biguá de Villa Biarritz	28 June 2025	Uruguayan Championships	Montevideo, Uruguay	
200m freestyle	1:47.25	h	Martin Kutscher	VFL Sindelfingen	27 November 2009	German Championships	Essen, Germany	
400m freestyle	3:54.62		Carlos Scanavino	-	3 September 1982			
800m freestyle	8:06.51		Juan Manuel Ergui	Club Biguá de Villa Biarritz	17 May 2025	Uruguayan Junior and Senior Meeting	Montevideo, Uruguay	
1500m freestyle	15:27.17		Carlos Scanavino	-	5 September 1982			
50m backstroke	25.12		Leo Nolles	Club Biguá de Villa Biarritz	28 June 2026	Uruguayan Championships	Montevideo, Uruguay	
100m backstroke	55.15		Leo Nolles	Club Biguá de Villa Biarritz	30 June 2023	Uruguayan Championships	Montevideo, Uruguay	
200m backstroke	2:01.15		Matías Vázquez	Club Atletico Olimpia	2 November 2025	Uruguayan Junior and Senior Championships	Montevideo, Uruguay	
50m breaststroke	26.99		Martín Melconian	C.N. Alcobendas	1 February 2020	Gp Ayto Camargo Absoluto	Maliano, Spain	
100m breaststroke	59.91		Martín Melconian	Us Toul	9 November 2019	Interclubs TC - Poule A Territoire Lorrain	Sarreguemines, France	
200m breaststroke	2:15.30		Manuel Machado	Club Biguá de Villa Biarritz	27 June 2026	Uruguayan Championships	Montevideo, Uruguay	
50m butterfly	23.72		Gabriel Melconian	-	1 November 2013			
100m butterfly	53.17		Leo Nolles	Club Biguá de Villa Biarritz	6 July 2024	Uruguayan Championships	Montevideo, Uruguay	
200m butterfly	1:59.80	b	Martin Kutscher	VFL Sindelfingen	28 November 2009	German Championships	Essen, Germany	
100m individual medley	55.46		Gabriel Melconian	-	27 October 2013			
200m individual medley	2:00.84	h	Martin Kutscher	VFL Sindelfingen	29 November 2009	German Championships	Essen, Germany	
400m individual medley	4:25.40		Colton Milne	Nepean Kanata Barracudas	14 December 2019	Ontario Junior Championships	Toronto, Canada	
4×50m freestyle relay	1:28.20		Leo Nolles (21.73); Mateo Gomez (22.50); Ben Nolles (22.75); Diego Aranda (21.22)	Club Biguá de Villa Biarritz	26 June 2026	Uruguayan Championships	Montevideo, Uruguay	
4×100m freestyle relay	3:20.99		Diego Aranda (49.18); Ben Nolles (50.90); Leo Nolles (50.00); Mateo Gomez (50.91)	Club Biguá de Villa Biarritz	27 June 2026	Uruguayan Championships	Montevideo, Uruguay	
4×200m freestyle relay	7:39.37		Joaquin Techera; Sebastian Torales; Pedro Chiancone; Andy Frank	Club Atlético Olimpia	19 November 2016	-	Montevideo, Uruguay	
4×50m medley relay	1:38.46		Juan Ignacio Saint-Upéry (25.54); Manuel Machado (27.54); Leo Nolles (23.63); Diego Aranda (21.75)	Club Biguá de Villa Biarritz	27 June 2026	Uruguayan Championships	Montevideo, Uruguay	
4×100m medley relay	3:40.14		Nicolas Francia; Martin Melconian; Rodrigo Cáceres; Gabriel Melconian	Club Biguá de Villa Biarritz	5 November 2011			

Legend: # – Record awaiting ratification by Federación Uruguaya de Natación; WR – World record; AM – Americas record;
Records not set in finals: h – heat; sf – semifinal; r – relay 1st leg; rh – relay heat 1st leg; b – B final; † – en route to final mark; so – swim-off; tt – time trial

=== Women ===
Event	Time		Name	Club	Date	Meet	Location	Ref
50 m freestyle	25.05		Angelina Solari	Club Atlético Olimpia	8 August 2026	Olimpia Cup	Montevideo, Uruguay	
100 m freestyle	53.93		Angelina Solari	Club Atlético Olimpia	8 August 2026	Olimpia Cup	Montevideo, Uruguay	
200 m freestyle	2:02.10		Angelina Solari	Club Bigua de Villa Biarritz	27 June 2026	Uruguayan Championships	Montevideo, Uruguay	
400 m freestyle	4:25.82		Martina Valiente	-	11 February 2017	-	Montevideo, Uruguay	
800 m freestyle	9:07.70		Carolina Atay	Club Biguá de Villa Biarritz	2 August 2025	Spring Metropolitan Meet	Buenos Aires, Argentina	
1500 m freestyle	17:17.21		Pilar Cañedo	Club Atletico Olimpia	27 June 2026	Uruguayan Championships	Montevideo, Uruguay	
50 m backstroke	27.51		Abril Aunchayna	Club Biguá de Villa Biarritz	13 October 2024	Biguá Cup	Montevideo, Uruguay	
100 m backstroke	59.56	h	Abril Aunchayna	Uruguay	10 December 2024	World Championships	Budapest, Hungary	
200 m backstroke	2:13.07		Abril Aunchayna	Fun	26 June 2026	Uruguayan Championships	Montevideo, Uruguay	
50 m breaststroke	31.79		Nicole Frank	Fun	27 June 2026	Uruguayan Championships	Montevideo, Uruguay	
100 m breaststroke	1:08.56		Nicole Frank	Fun	27 June 2026	Uruguayan Championships	Montevideo, Uruguay	
200 m breaststroke	2:26.44	h	Nicole Frank	Uruguay	16 December 2022	World Championships	Melbourne, Australia	
50 m butterfly	26.72		Angelina Solari	Club Atlético Olimpia	1 November 2025	Uruguayan Junior and Senior Championships	Montevideo, Uruguay	
100 m butterfly	59.85		Angelina Solari	Club Atlético Olimpia	7 August 2026	Olimpia Cup	Montevideo, Uruguay	
200 m butterfly	2:18.23		Angelina Solari	Club Atlético Olimpia	1 November 2024	Uruguayan Junior and Senior Championships	Montevideo, Uruguay	
100m individual medley	1:02.67		Nicole Frank	Club Atlético Olimpia	28 June 2025	Uruguayan Championships	Montevideo, Uruguay	
200m individual medley	2:13.63		Nicole Frank	Club Atlético Olimpia	5 July 2024	Uruguayan Championships	Montevideo, Uruguay	
400m individual medley	4:46.81	h	Nicole Frank	Uruguay	14 December 2024	World Championships	Budapest, Hungary	
4×50m freestyle relay	1:44.73		Angelina Solari (25.27); Belen Zeballos (26.43); Manuela Stenger (26.65); Luciana de Armas (26.43)	Club Atlético Olimpia	26 July 2026	Biguá Cup	Montevideo, Uruguay	
4×100m freestyle relay	3:51.04		Luciana de Armas (58.39); Belen Zeballos (59.47); Manuela Stenger (57.95); Angelina Solari (55.23)	Club Atlético Olimpia	26 June 2026	Uruguayan Championships	Montevideo, Uruguay	
4×200m freestyle relay	8:40.66		Martina Eastman; Carolina Cazot; Giuliana Dudok; Martina Valiente	Club Atlético Olimpia	19 November 2016			
4×50m medley relay	1:54.19		Giuliana Pereira (29.21); Bilu Bianchi (31.57); Nicole Frank (27.84); Angelina Solari (25.57)	Club Atlético Olimpia	5 July 2024	Uruguayan Championships	Montevideo, Uruguay	
4×100m medley relay	4:16.51		Giuliana Pereira (1:04.48); Bilu Bianchi (1:10.99); Nicole Frank (1:01.81); Angelina Solari (59.23)	Club Atlético Olimpia	6 July 2024	Uruguayan Championships	Montevideo, Uruguay	

Legend: # – Record awaiting ratification by Federación Uruguaya de Natación; WR – World record; AM – Americas record;
Records not set in finals: h – heat; sf – semifinal; r – relay 1st leg; rh – relay heat 1st leg; b – B final; † – en route to final mark; so – swim-off; tt – time trial

=== Mixed relay ===
Event	Time	Name	Club	Date	Meet	Location	Ref
4×50 m freestyle relay	1:38.27	Gabriel Melconian; Gabriel Fleitas; Ines Remersaro; Abril Aunchayna	Club Biguá de Villa Biarritz	July 2022			
4×100 m freestyle relay	3:40.34		Club Atlético Olimpia	18 November 2016			
4×200 m freestyle relay	8:03.44		Club Atlético Olimpia	July 2022			
4×50 m medley relay	1:45.51	Abril Aunchayna; Martin Melconian; Leo Nolles; Ines Remersaro	Club Biguá de Villa Biarritz	2 July 2023	Uruguayan Championships	Montevideo, Uruguay	
4×100 m medley relay	4:02.22	Abril Aunchayna; Pilar Shaban; Juan Kenny; Gabriel Fleitas	Club Biguá de Villa Biarritz	22 October 2022			

Legend: # – Record awaiting ratification by Federacion Uruguaya De Natacion; WR – World record; AM – Americas record;
Records not set in finals: h – heat; so – swim-off
