= Cabildo =

Cabildo may refer to:

== Buildings ==
- The Cabildo, a historic building in New Orleans, Louisiana, U.S.
- Cabildo of Buenos Aires, a historical building in Argentina, government house during colonial times
- Cabildo of Jujuy, a National Historic Monument in Argentina
- Cabildo de Luján, a historical building in Argentina, government house during colonial times
- Córdoba Cabildo, a historical building in Argentina, government house during colonial times
- Montevideo Cabildo, a former government house in Montevideo, now a museum

== Government ==
- Cabildo (council), a former Spanish municipal administrative unit governed by a council
- Cabildo abierto, or open cabildo, a Latin American political action for convening citizens to make important decisions
- Cabildo insular, island governments in the Canary Islands
- Cabildo Insular de Tenerife, the governing body of the island of Tenerife in the Canary Islands
- Cabildo of San Juan Tenochtitlan, a governing council established in the 16th century in Tenochtitlan (now Mexico City)

== Organizations ==
- Cabildo (Cuba), African ethnic associations created in Cuba in the late 16th century
- Cabildo Mayor del Pueblo Muisca, an organization of indigenous people in Colombia

== Other uses ==
- Cabildo (magazine), an Argentine nationalist Catholic magazine
- Cabildo (opera), a 1932 one-act opera by Amy Beach
- Cabildo, Buenos Aires, a town in Argentina.
- Cabildo, Chile, a city and commune located in the Petorca Province, Valparaíso Region
- USS Cabildo, a dock landing ship of the United States Navy, 1944–1970
