= Uruguay at the 2022 World Aquatics Championships =

- Flag of Uruguay
- FINA code: URU
- National federation: Uruguayan Swimming Federation
- Website: fun.org.uy (in Spanish)

in Budapest, Hungary 18 June 2022 – 3 July 2022
- Competitors: 8 in 3 sports
- Medals Ranked 0th: Gold 0 Silver 0 Bronze 0 Total 0

World Aquatics Championships appearances
- 1973; 1975; 1978; 1982; 1986; 1991; 1994; 1998; 2001; 2003; 2005; 2007; 2009; 2011; 2013; 2015; 2017; 2019; 2022; 2023; 2024

Uruguay competed at the 2022 World Aquatics Championships in Budapest, Hungary from 18 June to 3 July.

== Athletes by discipline ==
The following is the list of number of competitors participating at the Championships per discipline.

Sport	Men	Women	Total
Artistic swimming	0	2	2
Diving	0	0	0
Open water swimming	1	1	2
Swimming	2	2	4
Water polo	0	0	0
Total	3	5	8

== Artistic swimming ==
Women

Athlete	Event	Preliminaries		Final	
Athlete	Event	Points	Rank	Points	Rank
Clara De León	Solo technical routine	74.2252	18	Did not advance	
Clara De León	Solo free routine	77.5333	15	Did not advance	
Clara De León; Agustina Medina	Duet technical routine	72.7254	22	Did not advance	

== Open water swimming ==
Men

Athlete	Event	Time	Rank
Maximiliano Paccot	5 km	59:43.6	41
Maximiliano Paccot	10 km	2:05:01.3	48
Maximiliano Paccot	25 km	DNF	

Women

Athlete	Event	Time	Rank
Maiza Cardozo	5 km	1:11:31.5	50
Maiza Cardozo	10 km	2:31:14.5	58

== Swimming ==
Men

Athlete	Event	Heat		Semifinal		Final	
Athlete	Event	Time	Rank	Time	Rank	Time	Rank
Pedro Chiancone	100 m freestyle	51.61	60	Did not advance			
Pedro Chiancone	200 m freestyle	1:54.08	49	Did not advance			
Martin Melconian	50 m breaststroke	28.93	38	Did not advance			

Women

Athlete	Event	Heat		Semifinal		Final	
Athlete	Event	Time	Rank	Time	Rank	Time	Rank
Nicole Frank	100 m breaststroke	1:10.48	32	Did not advance			
Nicole Frank	200 m individual medley	2:17.78	28	Did not advance			
Micaela Sierra	50 m breaststroke	34.25	43	Did not advance			
Micaela Sierra	200 m breaststroke	2:39.05	27	Did not advance			
