= Uruguay at the 2024 World Aquatics Championships =

- Flag of Uruguay
- FINA code: URU
- National federation: Federación Uruguaya de Natación
- Website: fun.org.uy (in Spanish)

in Doha, Qatar
- Competitors: 7 in 3 sports
- Medals: Gold 0 Silver 0 Bronze 0 Total 0

World Aquatics Championships appearances
- 1973; 1975; 1978; 1982; 1986; 1991; 1994; 1998; 2001; 2003; 2005; 2007; 2009; 2011; 2013; 2015; 2017; 2019; 2022; 2023; 2024

Uruguay competed at the 2024 World Aquatics Championships in Doha, Qatar from 2 to 18 February.

== Competitors ==
The following is the list of competitors in the Championships.

| Sport | Men | Women | Total |
|---|---|---|---|
| Artistic swimming | 0 | 2 | 2 |
| Open water swimming | 1 | 0 | 1 |
| Swimming | 2 | 2 | 4 |
| Total | 3 | 4 | 7 |

== Artistic swimming ==
Women

| Athlete | Event | Preliminaries | | Final | |
| Athlete | Event | Points | Rank | Points | Rank |
|---|---|---|---|---|---|
| Agustina Medina; Lucía Ververis | Duet technical routine | 188.6535 | 28 | Did not advance | |
| Agustina Medina; Lucía Ververis | Duet free routine | 137.9854 | 31 | Did not advance | |

== Open water swimming ==
Men

| Athlete | Event | Time | Rank |
|---|---|---|---|
| Maximiliano Paccot | Men's 5 km | 55:24.7 | 51 |
| Maximiliano Paccot | Men's 10 km | 2:01:03.5 | 65 |

== Swimming ==
Uruguay entered 4 swimmers.

Men

| Athlete | Event | Heat | | Semifinal | | Final | |
| Athlete | Event | Time | Rank | Time | Rank | Time | Rank |
|---|---|---|---|---|---|---|---|
| Diego Aranda | 50 metre freestyle | 23.06 | 41 | Did not advance | | | |
| Leo Nolles | 100 metre freestyle | 50.73 | 40 | Did not advance | | | |
| Leo Nolles | 100 metre butterfly | 55.86 | 45 | Did not advance | | | |

Women

| Athlete | Event | Heat | | Semifinal | | Final | |
| Athlete | Event | Time | Rank | Time | Rank | Time | Rank |
|---|---|---|---|---|---|---|---|
| Abril Aunchayna | 50 metre backstroke | 30.21 | 37 | Did not advance | | | |
| Abril Aunchayna | 100 metre backstroke | 1:05.31 | 41 | Did not advance | | | |
| Nicole Frank | 100 metre breaststroke | 1:12.81 | 39 | Did not advance | | | |
| Nicole Frank | 200 metre individual medleye | 2:20.66 | 21 | Did not advance | | | |
