= Uruguay at the 2023 World Aquatics Championships =

- Flag of Uruguay
- FINA code: URU
- National federation: Federación Uruguaya de Natación
- Website: fun.org.uy (in Spanish)

in Fukuoka, Japan
- Competitors: 7 in 3 sports
- Medals: Gold 0 Silver 0 Bronze 0 Total 0

World Aquatics Championships appearances
- 1973; 1975; 1978; 1982; 1986; 1991; 1994; 1998; 2001; 2003; 2005; 2007; 2009; 2011; 2013; 2015; 2017; 2019; 2022; 2023; 2024

Uruguay is set to compete at the 2023 World Aquatics Championships in Fukuoka, Japan from 14 to 30 July.

== Artistic swimming ==
Uruguay entered 2 artistic swimmers.

Women

Athlete	Event	Preliminaries		Final	
Athlete	Event	Points	Rank	Points	Rank
Agustina Medina; Lucía Pérez	Duet technical routine	153.1900	36	did not advance	
Agustina Medina; Lucía Pérez	Duet free routine	120.6291	29	did not advance	

== Open water swimming ==
Uruguay entered 1 open water swimmer.

Men

Athlete	Event	Time	Rank
Maximiliano Paccot	Men's 5 km	1:01:09.7	51
Maximiliano Paccot	Men's 10 km	2:11:12.6	62

== Swimming ==
Uruguay entered 4 swimmers.

Men

Athlete	Event	Heat		Semifinal		Final	
Athlete	Event	Time	Rank	Time	Rank	Time	Rank
Diego Aranda	200 metre freestyle	2:02.84	70	Did not advance			
Diego Aranda	50 metre butterfly	25.87	66	Did not advance			
Leo Nolles	50 metre freestyle	23.10	55	Did not advance			
Leo Nolles	100 metre freestyle	50.87	53	Did not advance			

Women

Athlete	Event	Heat		Semifinal		Final	
Athlete	Event	Time	Rank	Time	Rank	Time	Rank
Abril Aunchayna	50 metre backstroke	30.04	40	Did not advance			
Abril Aunchayna	100 metre backstroke	1:04.66	45	Did not advance			
Nicole Frank	200 metre individual medley	2:21.89	33	Did not advance			
Nicole Frank	400 metre individual medley	5:04.07	31	—		Did not advance	
