= Uruguay at the 2019 World Aquatics Championships =

- Flag of Uruguay
- FINA code: URU
- National federation: Uruguayan Swimming Federation
- Website: fun.org.uy (in Spanish)

in Gwangju, South Korea
- Competitors: 5 in 2 sports
- Medals: Gold 0 Silver 0 Bronze 0 Total 0

World Aquatics Championships appearances
- 1973; 1975; 1978; 1982; 1986; 1991; 1994; 1998; 2001; 2003; 2005; 2007; 2009; 2011; 2013; 2015; 2017; 2019; 2022; 2023; 2024

Uruguay competed at the 2019 World Aquatics Championships in Gwangju, South Korea from 12 to 28 July.

== Open water swimming ==
Uruguay qualified one male open water swimmer.

Men

Athlete	Event	Time	Rank
Maximiliano Paccot	Men's 5 km	56:26.1	47
Maximiliano Paccot	Men's 10 km	2:00:24.5	65
Maximiliano Paccot	Men's 25 km	5:41:44.7	22

== Swimming ==
Uruguay has entered four swimmers.

Men

Athlete	Event	Heat		Semifinal		Final	
Athlete	Event	Time	Rank	Time	Rank	Time	Rank
Enzo Martínez	50 m freestyle	22.87	47	did not advance			
Enzo Martínez	100 m freestyle	50.99	62	did not advance			
Martin Melconian	50 m breaststroke	27.85	31	did not advance			
Martin Melconian	100 m breaststroke	1:02.21 NR	43	did not advance			

Women

Athlete	Event	Heat		Semifinal		Final	
Athlete	Event	Time	Rank	Time	Rank	Time	Rank
Nicole Frank	200 m freestyle	2:11.56	47	did not advance			
Nicole Frank	200 m individual medley	2:26.49	33	did not advance			
Inés Remersaro	50 m freestyle	27.41	55	did not advance			
Inés Remersaro	100 m freestyle	59.69	58	did not advance			
