= Puerto de la Música =

The Puerto de la Música (Spanish, "Port of Music") is a planned cultural complex which was to be built in Rosario, Santa Fe, Argentina, beside the Paraná River. As of June 2012 the plan is on hold for the foreseeable future.

== The project ==
The Puerto de la Música was projected by Brazilian architect Oscar Niemeyer, famous for the design of the major public buildings of Brasília in the mid-1950s. Its plan includes a concert hall, an exhibition center and a music school, with the stated goal of becoming "a massive, open and inclusive cultural space". The land destined for the complex has an area of 65,000 m^{2}, while the total area of the planned buildings is 20,900 m^{2}. The theater would have room for 2,500 attendants, and 30,000 should be able to watch from outside.

Presented to the public in 2008 by governor and former Rosario mayor Hermes Binner, the Puerto was originally planned to open in 2010, the year of the bicentennial of Argentina's emancipation from Spain. By 2010 the project, with a total budget estimated around 300 million pesos (about 75 million USD at the time), had not advanced. A foundation was created to publicize the project and request private donations. The bids for the first stage of the project, costing about 40 million pesos (10 million USD) were received and evaluated later that year. The opening date was moved to 2012, the bicentennial of the creation of the Argentine flag (which took place in Rosario).

== Delays ==
Legal and political hurdles arose in the meantime, as the land on the banks of the Paraná river that was to be taken up by the Puerto belonged to the port of Rosario. This presented two problems: first, the Port Workers' Union (SUPA) feared that the Puerto's project meant jobs would be lost; second, port areas in Argentina are under national jurisdiction, overseen by the Subsecretariat of Ports and Navigable Ways, which had not given the provincial government or the municipality of Rosario permission to use the land. Moreover, the political opposition questioned the location and/or the convenience of such major expenditure in the face of other concerns.

In April 2011 SUPA occupied the seat of the Management Office for the Port of Rosario (ENAPRO) protesting the imminent start of the works on the site. Despite reassurances about their jobs by ENAPRO and the provincial government, the occupation went on for five months, until the end of 2011, and the works could not start.

== Suspension of the project ==
Like other provinces, Santa Fe Province incurred a significant fiscal deficit in 2011, which was an election year. In May 2012 the new governor, Antonio Bonfatti, announced that although the legal blocks for the Puerto de la Música had been lifted, the project would have to wait until the provincial finances improved and there was no fixed schedule for the beginning of the works. Soon after, the Puerto de la Música Foundation stopped soliciting donations for the project, citing the uncertainty about the date and the effect of inflation as reasons.
