= Flag of the Andes =

Flag used by José de San Martín and his Army of the Andes

Flag of the Army of the Andes
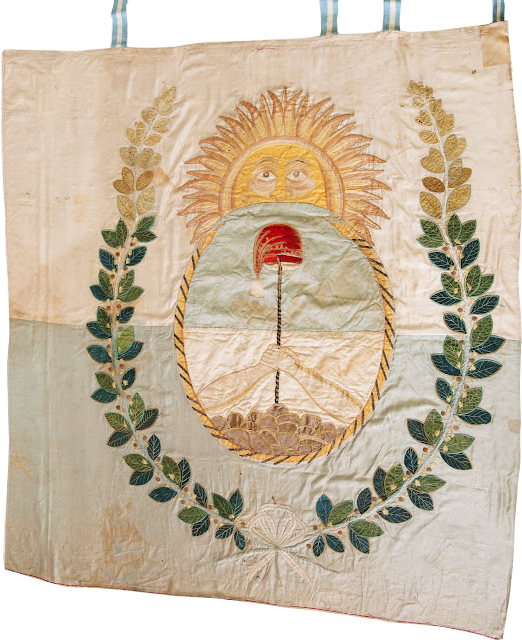
- Proportion: 72:61
- Adopted: January 1817; 209 years ago (Army of the Andes); October 21, 1992; 34 years ago (as flag of Mendoza)
- Designed by: José de San Martín

The flag of the Andes is a preserved flag from the time of the Argentine War of Independence, used by patriot José de San Martín and his Army of the Andes during their Crossing of the Andes and their subsequent military campaigns to Chile and Peru. The flag of the Andes was personally designed by San Martín and sewn by ladies from the Cuyo region and wives of San Martín's officers. It includes a proto-coat of arms of Argentina placed horizontally over a sky-blue and white bicolor background.

The same design used in the flag of the Andes is used by the provincial government of Mendoza Province as their official flag.

== Appearance ==
The basis of the new flag were the light blue and white colours, which had been the official national flag of United Provinces of the Río de la Plata since July. The flag also features the coat of arms adopted by the Assembly of the Year XIII, but with an additional drawing of a mountain below the pike. The coat of arms is not in the center. The flag is more high than wide, measuring 122 cm by 144 cm. Currently, the flag can be hoisted using four handles sewn to the shorter side above the coat of arms, making it a Vexillum. It is not known how the flag was displayed by the Army of the Andes itself. The version with the "lying" shield and vertical stripes was painted in the early 20th century by the Chilean artist Pedro Subercaseaux, whose paintings have perpetuated this version. Another image from the war times shows a much longer flag, with the "standing" coat of arms moved towards the hoist.

== History ==
The flag was designed in 1816 when José de San Martín was preparing an expedition from Cuyo Province to royalist-controlled Chile. On 5 January 1817, in Mendoza, the day before the expedition set off, San Martín ordered the soldiers to swear an oath to the patron saint of the army, Our Lady of Carmen, and to the flag. The flag accompanied the army during the fighting in Chile, but was not taken from there when San Martín set off on an expedition to Peru in 1820. In March 1823, the governor of Mendoza, Pedro Molina, asked Chile to return the banner, which was then placed in the church of St. Francis. The original church was destroyed in the 1861 earthquake, but the flag was recovered from the ruins of the temple and moved to the Government Palace. In 1866, after the last federalist uprising against President Bartolomé Mitre, the flag was taken by the defeated rebels who fled to Chile. The fate of the flag until 1877, when it was brought back to Mendoza, is unknown. In 1880, when the remains of José de San Martín were repatriated, the banner accompanied them during a ceremonial funeral. After this event, the banner hung on a wall in the Buenos Aires Metropolitan Cathedral. In 1889, it was returned and shown to the people of Mendoza in a civic procession on May 25. Since then, the flag has been occasionally taken to ceremonies in Mendoza, but also to the inauguration of the monument in Santa Fe in 1902. During the government of Rodolfo Gabrielli in 1992, the flag was granted an honorary guard of the 11th Mountain Infantry Regiment. That same year, Professor Patricia Lissa carried out the first renovation of the flag. In November 2011, the same specialist carried out more detailed conservation work which culminated in a ceremonial unveiling on 17 August 2012.

== Flag of Mendoza ==
According to provincial law no. 5930, the preserved flag of the Andes was used as the model for the first provincial flag for Mendoza. The flag has been in force since 21 October 1992 and de jure should be identical to the original, however the law does not specify how the flag should be raised, so the hoist is placed on the side or above the coat of arms. Mendoza Flag Day falls on January 5 and commemorates the oath taking by the Army of the Andes. In 1994, the province of Jujuy adopted as its own flag another banner from the war of independence, also consisting of an archaic coat of arms on a cloth of similar proportions to Mendoza.

== See also ==
- List of Argentine flags
- Flag of the Civil Freedom of Argentina
- Flag of San Juan Province, Argentina
- Flag of Tucumán
