= 1863 Jujuy earthquake =

6.4 magnitude earthquake in Argentina

- Location within Argentina
- Local date: January 14, 1863
- Magnitude: 6.4 (est.)
- Depth: 30
- Epicenter: 23.6°S 65.0°W
- Areas affected: Argentina, Jujuy Province
- Max. intensity: MMI VIII (Severe)

The 1863 Jujuy earthquake took place in the province of Jujuy, Argentina on 15 January at about 11:00 (UTC−3). It had an estimated magnitude of 6.4 and its epicenter was at 23°36′S 65°00′W, at a depth of about 50 kilometres (31 mi).

This earthquake had a felt intensity of VIII on the Mercalli intensity scale. Its magnitude and duration made it exceptionally destructive, causing damage to the cathedral, the Cabildo (colonial government house) and precarious homes in San Salvador de Jujuy, the provincial capital.

== See also ==
- List of earthquakes in Argentina
- List of historical earthquakes
