= Cabildo of Jujuy =

Historic building in Argentina

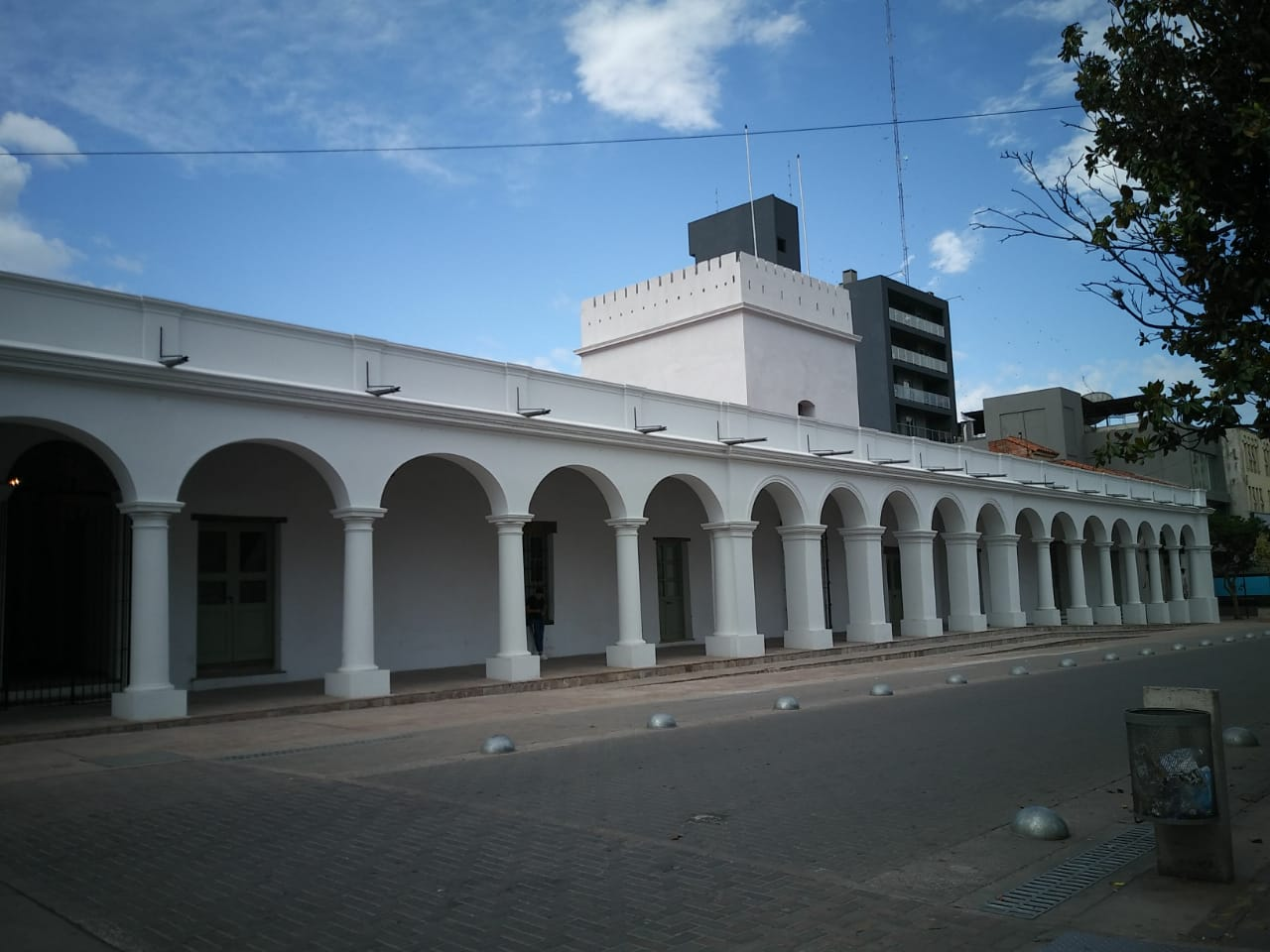
Photography of the Cabildo of Jujuy from 2019

The Cabildo of Jujuy (Spanish: Cabildo de Jujuy) is a cabildo founded on 19 April 1593 at the Argentina province of Jujuy. It was where Manuel Belgrano showed the National Argentine Flag, on 25 May 1812. It collapsed by the 1863 Jujuy earthquake, and started being reconstructed in 1864 and finally finished three years later in 1867. On 14 July 1941, it was declared Monumento Histórico Nacional (National Historic Monument).

== History ==
Spanish conqueror Francisco de Argañarás y Murguía, along with his hueste, found the land where he later ended up founding the city on 16 April 1593. The following day, Argañarás chose Rodrigo Pereyra as scrivener, founded the city archive and the aperture of the Cabildo book. On 19 April of the same year Argañarás founded the city San Salvador de Velazco (currently San Salvador de Jujuy, capital of Jujuy) and chose the Cabildo members. The exact date of the construction of the cabildo is unknown due to archives loss, but it is known that, a few years after the foundation, Argañarás asked to the Cabildo to be "built the fastest possible". It was later informed that the city "has put and signed Cabildo and jail houses".

On 25 May 1812, Manuel Belgrano presented the then-just-created National Flag to the town and army, inside the Jujuy Cabildo. On 25 May of the next year, Belgrano gave to this cabildo the Bandera Nacional de Nuestra Libertad Civil (National Flag of our Civile Freedom), as a gratitude symbol.

In 1821 the cabildo began to go downside after Bernandino Rivadavia abolished the Cabildo of Buenos Aires.

At early 1825, Juan Antonio Álvarez de Arenales, the then Salta governor, sent a law project to try to transfer the building and thus try to finish with the privileges the cabildo had since the colonial times, for "modernizing" the State. On 9 February 1825, the room of the representatives accept the project and, as a result, it was established by Arenales and the building of the cabildo was handed over to the Departamento de Policía de Jujuy (Jujuy Police Department).

On 18 November 1831 was established, in this cabildo, the politic autonomy act to become independent from Salta.

On 18 December 1837, Pablo Alemán, the then governor of Jujuy, ordered the invalidation of the Cabildo y Regimiento of the city San Salvador de Jujuy. It began ruling on 1 January 1838, thus being the last Argentine cabildo to be abolished. Since then, it worked as a jail, as headquarters of Guardia Urbana and as provisional Government House.

On 15 January 1863, due to an earthquake, the cabildo collapsed in such a way it was decided to demolish it. Its reconstruction was planned in April 1863, being already at an advanced stage in 1864 and finished three years later in 1867. This earthquake also caused the collapsing of other buildings.

On 14 July 1941 it was declared “Monumento Histórico Nacional por Decreto N° 95 687” (National Historic Monument by Decree No. 95 687).

== Cabildo II ==
Since 2019 a remodelling of the Cabildo was being thought. It was not until June 2021, however, when the project “Cabildo II” (its full Spanish name being “Recuperación y Puesta en Valor del Cabildo Histórico de Jujuy”; on English “Recuperation and Enhancement of the Historic Cabildo of Jujuy”) was announced. It promises hosting “the museum in which all the history of the Province of Jujuy will be told”. This project, planned to be finished in May 2023, demolished inside zones of the cabildo, although, according to Carlos Stanic (the titular of the Ministerio de Infraestructura) “[...] the demolitions were done acknowledging the architectonic characteristics that must be preserved [...]”.

Also, besides reconstructing the cabildo itself, there will be space for the Historic Archive, two public zones with a capacity of 120 persons, a "media center", administration offices, a food zone, bathrooms and an open park, among other services. Cabildo II is planned to be a familiar and historic place at the same time

== See also ==
- 1863 Jujuy earthquake
- San Salvador de Jujuy
