= Cockade of Argentina =

National ornament

The national cockade of Argentina.

The Argentine cockade (Spanish: escarapela argentina) is a badge nationality of Argentina, instituted by decree on February 18, 1812 by the First Triumvirate, who determined that "the national cockade of the United Provinces of the Río de la Plata shall be of colours white and light blue [...]". Formerly was considered a national symbol.

The National Cockade Day is on May 18, the date on which it is assumed that the cockade was first used by the ladies of Buenos Aires during the events of the 1810 May Revolution.

== Origin ==
The origin of the colours of the cockade and the reasons for their election cannot be accurately established. Among the several versions, one states that the colours white and light blue were first adopted during the British invasions of the Río de la Plata in 1806 and 1807 by the Regiment of Patricians, the first urban militia regiment of the Río de la Plata. Supposedly, a group of ladies from Buenos Aires first wore the cockade on May 19, 1810, in a visit to then-Colonel Cornelio Saavedra, head of the regiment.

Between May 22 and 25 of the same year, it is known that the chisperos, or patriots, identified adherents to the May Revolution by giving them ribbons with those colours. An anonymous manuscript quoted by historian Marfany expresses that on May 21, a Monday, revolutionaries presented themselves as such with white ribbons on their clothes and hats. In Juan Manuel Beruti's memoirs, Memorias Curiosas, it is commented on the use of white ribbons on clothes and cockades with olive branches on hats.

It was also documented by Spanish functionary Faustino Ansay that when news of the revolution arrived to Mendoza, its supporters started to wear white stripes. A report attributed to Ramón Manuel de Pazos says that on May 21, 1810, Domingo French and Antonio Beruti distributed said stripes as a sign of peace and unity between patriots and supporters of the Spanish government, but given the hostility of the latter, on May 25 they began spreading red stripes as a reference to the Jacobins. Both colours were later adopted by the members of the cabildo of Tarija as they joined the revolution.

A version by Bartolomé Mitre affirmed that French "entered in one of the shops of the recova and took several tracks of white and light blue stripes. [He] also placed pickets with orders of letting only patriots in and make them put on the distinctive [stripes]", although his statement might be biased due to the fact that blue was one of the colours of the party he was a member of, and which would be later known as the Unitarian Party. Mitre's words are perhaps what originated the erroneous belief that attributes the creation of the Argentine cockade to French and Beruti. In any case, it is known that in March 1811 the Patriotic Society created by people from Mariano Moreno's circle wore the white and light blue ribbons.

== Relation with the Argentine flag ==
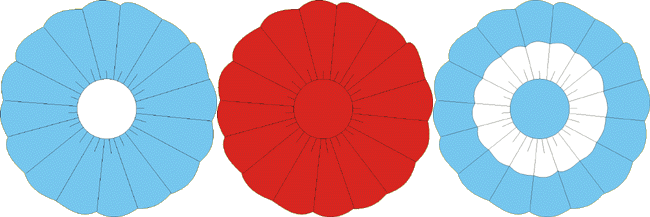
The Argentine cockade in 1810 (white and blue), 1811 (red), and 1812 (blue, white, and blue).

In a note dated February 13, 1812, Manuel Belgrano solicited the triumvirate the use of the white and light blue national cockade, having to omit red since the Spanish troops and the royalists had been using it as a distinctive colour against the revolution. A legend says Belgrano was inspired by the sky and the clouds when choosing such colours, but he took them from the ribbons and cockades that were already being used.

On February 18, 1812, the government decided to create the national cockade of the United Provinces of the Río de la Plata with light blue at its outer border and centre, and white between both.

Belgrano then used the same colours to design the national flag, to which his men first took oath on February 27. That day the triumvirate ordered Belgrano to take charge of the Northern Army (Ejército del Norte) and as a result of his immediate departure, he did not become aware that the government had rejected the new flag.
