= Flag of the Civil Freedom of Argentina =

The Flag of Civil Freedom, in Spanish, called Bandera Nacional de Nuestra Libertad Civil is an important historical flag of Argentina. It was donated to the inhabitants of the city of San Salvador de Jujuy by Manuel Belgrano, one of the Libertadores of the state, during the War of Independence. On 29 November 1994, the Jujuy Province adopted this design as its flag. The original flag is 1.40 m high and 0.90 m wide, white in color, and has the coat of arms of the Assembly of the Year XIII in the center.

== Construction Sheet ==
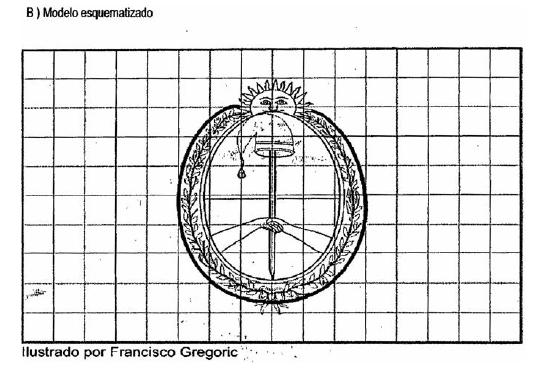
Construction sheet of the flag of the Civil Freedom of Argentina, according to the annex to Act 27134 of 4 June 2015

== History ==
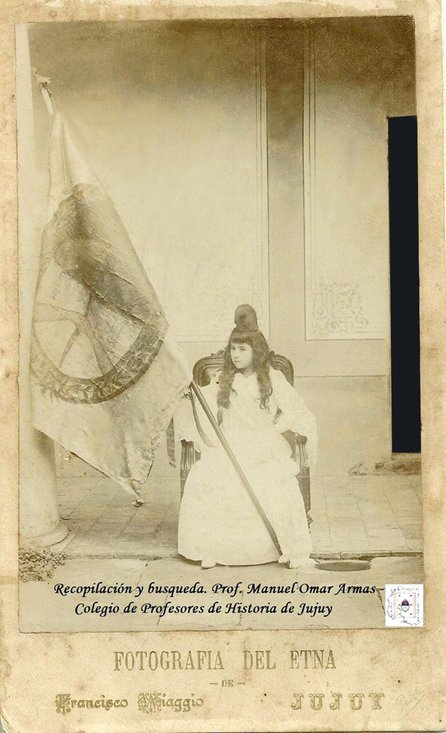
Woman holding a flag of the Civil Freedom of Argentina, 1903.

On 25 May 1813, the City of San Salvador de Jujuy received the flag from General Manuel Belgrano, considered its creator, who donated it "in honor and courage shown by the combatants in the Battle of Tucumán and the Battle of Salta."

The banner was kept for many years in different places in the city: the Cabildo, the Cathedral Basilica of the Holy Saviour, the Legislature, until on 20 April 1927, a room was inaugurated specifically for its conservation and veneration. On 27 March 1967 Julio Rodolfo Alsogaray, the Commander-in-chief of the Argentine Army decided to appoint the 3rd Mechanized Infantry Regiment "General Belgrano" as the sole custodian of the original copy of the flag.

== Flag of Jujuy ==
At the beginning of the 1991 term, a private petition was submitted to the Legislature of Jujuy, along with a bill to recognize the "flag of the Civil Freedom of Argentina" as the official emblem of the province. The proposal raised some doubts, so the body asked the National Academy of History of Argentina to issue a ruling on the matter, which was positively confirmed by the opinion of Armando Raúl Bazán.

Provincial Law No. 4816 of 29 November 1994 established the first flag of Jujuy. The law stated that the provincial flag would be a white field with the coat of arms identical to the flag of the Civil Freedom of Argentina, but did not define the proportions. On May 30, 2013, the previous Act was repealed and replaced by Act No. 5772. The new law confirmed the provincial flag, but precisely defined its appearance.

== See also ==
- Flag of Macha
- List of Argentine flags
