= Flag of Argentina =

Argentine Republic
- Use: National flag and state and naval ensign
- Proportion: 5:8
- Adopted: 27 February 1812 (original), 1861 (current version), November 2010 (standardization)
- Design: A horizontal triband of light blue (top and bottom) and white with a Sun of May centered on the white band.
- Designed by: Manuel Belgrano
- Use: Civil flag and ensign
- Proportion: 5:8 or 9:14
- Adopted: 27 February 1812
- Design: A horizontal triband of light blue (top and bottom) and white (center).
- Designed by: Manuel Belgrano

The national flag of Argentina, often referred to as the Argentine flag (Spanish: bandera argentina), is a triband, composed of three equally wide horizontal bands coloured sky blue and pearly white. There are multiple interpretations on the reasons for those colors. The flag was created by Manuel Belgrano, in line with the creation of the Cockade of Argentina, and was first raised at the city of Rosario on 27 February 1812, during the Argentine War of Independence. The National Flag Memorial was later built on the site. The First Triumvirate did not approve the use of the flag, but the Assembly of the Year XIII allowed the use of the flag as a war flag. It was the Congress of Tucumán which finally designated it as the national flag in 1816. A yellow Sun of May was added to the center in 1818 as a war flag.

The full flag featuring the sun is called the Official Ceremonial Flag (Bandera Oficial de Ceremonia). The flag without the sun is considered the Ornamental Flag (Bandera de Ornato). While both versions are equally considered the national flag, the ornamental version must always be hoisted below the Official Ceremony Flag. In vexillological terms, the Official Ceremonial Flag is the civil, state, and war flag and ensign, while the Ornamental Flag is an alternative civil flag and ensign. There is controversy of the true colour of the first flag between historians and the descendants of Manuel Belgrano between blue and pale blue.

== Design ==
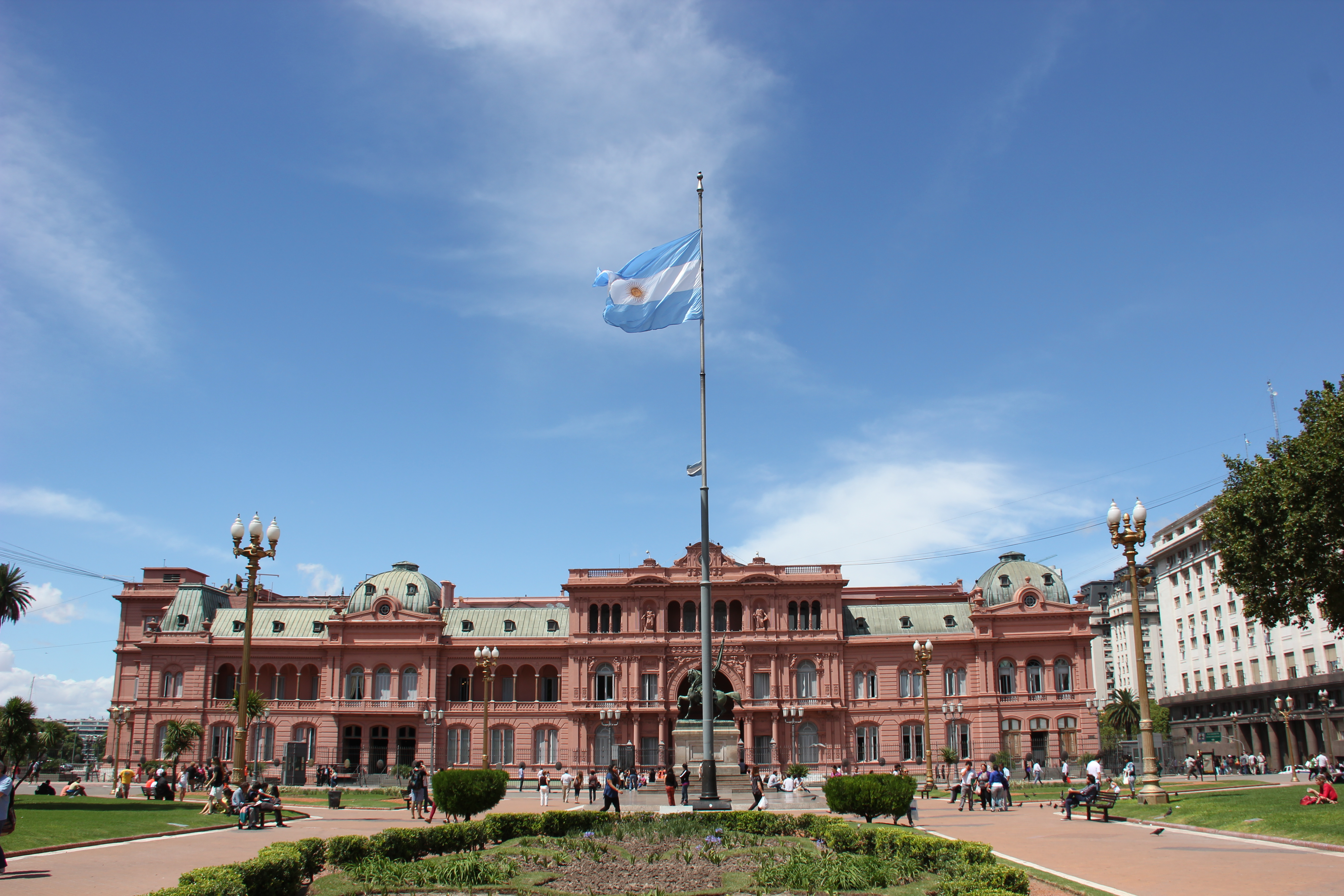
The flag at Plaza de Mayo, in front of the Casa Rosada.

Popular belief attributes the colors to those of the sky, clouds and the sun; some anthems to the flag like "Aurora" or "Salute to the flag" state so as well. However, historians usually disregard this idea, and attribute them to loyalty towards the House of Bourbon.

After the May Revolution, the first times of the Argentine War of Independence, the Triumvirate claimed to be acting on behalf of the Spanish King Ferdinand VII, who was prisoner of Napoleon Bonaparte during the Peninsular War. Whether such loyalty was real or a trick to conceal independentismo is a topic of dispute. The creation of a new flag with those colors would have been then a way to denote autonomy, while keeping the relations with the captive king alive.

=== Sun of May ===
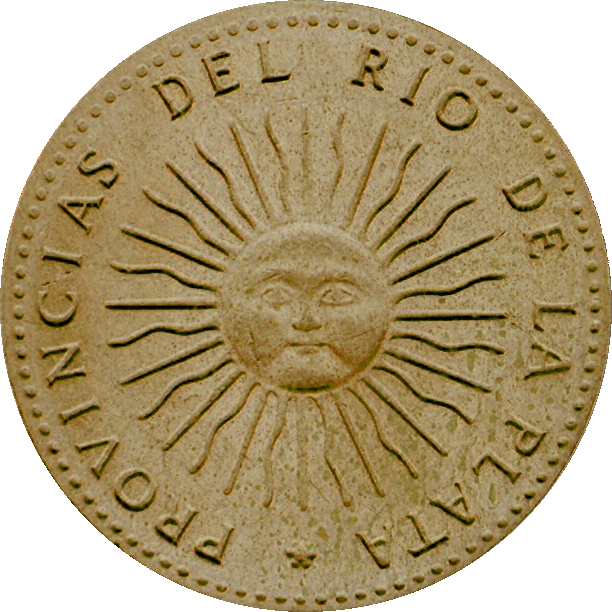
The Sun of May on the first coin of the United Provinces of the Río de la Plata.

The sun is called the Sun of May because it is a replica of an engraving on the first Argentine coin, approved in 1813, whose value was eight escudos (one Spanish dollar). It has 16 straight and 16 waved sunbeams.

In 1978 the sun color was specified to be golden yellow (amarillo oro), to have an inner diameter of 10 cm, and an outer diameter of 25 cm (the diameter of the sun equals 5/6 the height of the white stripe. The sun's face is 2/5 of its height). It features 32 rays, alternately wavy and straight, and from 1978 it must be embroidered in the "Official Flag Ceremony".

=== Shape and size ===
In 2002, the Instituto Argentino de Normalización y Certificación defined the flag's official proportions as 10:16, or 5:8. It is one of five national flags that use the ratio 5:8, the others being Guatemala, Palau, Poland, and Sweden.

From 1978, the flag's official proportions was 9:14, and its official size was 0.9 by 1.4 meters, which each stripe being 30 centimeters high. In the center stripe there is an emblem known as the Sun of May (Spanish: Sol de Mayo), a golden sun. Historian Diego Abad de Santillán claimed that the Sun of May was a representation of the Aztec god Inti.

Flags with proportions of 1:2 and 2:3 are also in use.

=== Colors ===
The colors are officially defined using the CIE 1976 standard:

Scheme	Sky blue	Yellow	Brown
CIE (L*, a*, b*)	67.27, -6.88, -32.23	74.97, 29.22, 81.58	44.53, 27.16, 22.48
*Black and white are as normal. *Source: http://manuelbelgrano.gov.ar/bandera/normas-iram/

The following are given for computer, textile, print and plastic use:

Colours scheme	Sky Blue	Yellow	Brown
RGB	R: 116, G: 172, B: 223	R: 246, G: 180, B: 14	R: 133, G: 52, B: 10
Hexadecimal	#74ACDF	#F6B40E	#85340A
CMYK	C: 100%, M: 68%, Y: 0%, K: 37%	C: 0%, M: 18%, Y: 100%, K: 0%	C: 16%, M: 0%, Y: 10%, K: 24%
Pantone (textile)	16-4132 TC	14-1064 TC	18-1441 TC
Pantone (print)	284 C / 284 U	1235 C / 116 U	483 C / 483 U
Pantone (plastic)	Q 300-4-1	Q 030-2-1	Q 120-2-4
Number	75AADB	FCBF49	843511

The Spanish word celeste (sky blue) is used to describe the colour of the blue stripes.

== History ==
=== Flags of Spain and first flag of United Provinces of the Río de la Plata ===
Flag of United Provinces of the Río de la Plata (1810-1816)

The first flags used in the territory of modern Argentina were those associated with the Spanish crown. The last formally used Spanish flag was a red and yellow one, established by King Charles III in 1785 and used mainly for naval and military purposes.

When the United Provinces of the Río de la Plata became independent in the May Revolution of 1810, they continued to use the Spanish flag. This was due to the political position that the new government was acting on behalf of King Ferdinand VII of Spain, who was then a prisoner of Napoleon during the Peninsular War. The yellow and red flag that flew over the seat of government in the fort of Buenos Aires is currently kept in the National Historical Museum. This flag does not maintain the proportions imposed by Charles III, as the three stripes are the same width. The Spanish flag was finally abandoned after the formal declaration of independence on 9 July 1816, being replaced by the blue and white flags created in 1812 by General Manuel Belgrano.

=== War of Independence ===
==== The origin of colors ====
The light blue and white colors were used on the cockade before they were used on the flag. The origin of the colours of the cockade and the reasons for their election cannot be accurately established. Theories include the symbolism of the House of Bourbon, especially the ribbon of the Order of Charles III. Another version speaks of the colors of the then unofficial Buenos Aires coat of arms, where blue meant the sky and silver, later changed to white, meant the waters of La Plata. Another possible source of colours is the plume of the Los Patricios during the British invasion of 1806 and 1807.

==== American Flag ====
Speculative two-stripe flag

Traditional flag of the Belgrano army

Another variant of the Belgrano army flag

On 26 February 1812, General Manuel Belgrano wrote to the government of the United Provinces of the Río de la Plata to propose the creation of a national flag, arguing that the colors of the recently adopted national cockade should also be reflected in the banners flown by patriot forces. In his letter, he noted the problem of using flags identical to those of the enemy, and proposed adopting distinctive symbols that would reflect the new political reality. Without waiting for a formal response, Belgrano inaugurated the following day an artillery battery called "Independencia" on Espinillo Island in the Paraná River, near present-day Rosario, and presented the new flag in a ceremony. Local tradition has it that the first flag was sewn by María Catalina Echevarría de Vidal and raised by Cosme Maciel, a civilian sailor. In a second letter sent the same day, Belgrano informed the government of the events, describing the raising of a flag made in white and light blue, matching the cockade. On that day, Belgrano said the following words:

Soldiers of the Fatherland, we have heretofore had the glory of wearing the national cockade; there (pointing to the Independence battery), on the Independence Battery, where our Government has recently had the honor of bestowing it upon, shall our weapons enlarge their glory. Let us swear to defeat our enemies, internal and external, and South America will become the temple of Independence and Freedom. In testament that you so swear it, say with me: LONG LIVE THE FATHERLAND! (after the oath) "Captain, sir, and troops chosen for the first time for the Independence Battery: go, take possession of it and fulfill the oath you have just sworn today."

The exact color scheme of the first flag remains a subject of debate, due to the fact that, in describing the flag in a non-intuitive way, he first mentioned white. Some historians suggest that this first flag was with two stripes with white above light blue. In his first letter, Belgrano described the location of the first raising of the flag as the "Libertad" artillery battery. In a letter dated 18 July 1812, he corrected that the flag was flown at the Independencia battery, not the unfinished Libertad battery.

In early March 1812, the First Triumvirate ordered General Manuel Belgrano to abandon the new white and light blue flag, since they were still acting in the name of Ferdinand VII. Belgrano, who continued the campaign of the Army of the North, was unable to receive this order. After reaching San Salvador de Jujuy, Belgrano celebrated the second anniversary of the revolution on 25 May 1812. On that day, Canon Juan Ignacio Gorriti blessed the white and light blue flag in the cathedral. Belgrano then ordered his soldiers to swear allegiance to this banner, which he called the "national flag".

Flag of the Civil Freedom of Argentina

It is not known whether it was the same flag that first flew in Rosario or a different one, since military tradition dictated that flags remain with military units, not commanders. On 29 May, Belgrano sent a letter informing the government of the ceremony. In response, he was reprimanded by the Triumvirate for using the new flag without authorization. In his response on 18 July, Belgrano explained that he was unaware of the previous ban and repeated that the flag was white and light blue. Despite this, the Army of the North continued to use the flag, including in the victorious Battle of Tucumán on 24 September 1812.

In early February 1813, during the Army of the North’s advance toward Salta, General Manuel Belgrano received orders from the Assembly of Year XIII to have his troops swear allegiance. On 13 February 1813, after crossing the Salado River, later known also as the "River of the Oath". Belgrano led a solemn ceremony in which the troops swore obedience to the Assembly under the white-and-light-blue flag. In that ceremony, the flag was carried by Major General Eustoquio Díaz Vélez, preceded by Colonel Martín Rodríguez and Belgrano himself, escorted by granaderos playing music.

On 20 February 1813, the Battle of Salta was fought, in which Belgrano achieved a complete victory. After the battle Eustoquio Díaz Vélez placed the flag on the balcony of the Cabildo, and the trophies captured from the royalists were placed in the Chapter House. Díaz Vélez, appointed by Belgrano as military governor of the province of Salta del Tucumán, was the first official to use the blue-and-white flag.

While stationed in the city of San Salvador de Jujuy on 23 May, Belgrano presented the residents with a white cloth bearing the coat of arms of the Assembly of the Year XIII, which is today known as the flag of the Civil Freedom.

The Army of the North used light blue and white flags until its destruction at Ayohuma in modern-day Bolivia at 14 November 1813. After the defeat, two of the flags used in this campaign were hidden in a chapel in the village of Macha to avoid capture by royalist forces. These flags remained hidden until their accidental discovery in 1885. Both banners consist of three horizontal stripes of white and light blue, with one having a white stripe between two blue stripes and the other having a blue stripe between the white stripes. One was returned to Argentina and is currently located at the National Museum of History in Buenos Aires, while the other remained in Bolivia and is kept at the Casa de la Libertad in Sucre, Bolivia.

==== Artigas flag ====
Early version of the League of the Free Peoples flag

Early version of the League of the Free Peoples flag

Flag of the League of the Free Peoples

In 1814, José Gervasio Artigas, leader of the Provincia Oriental (now Uruguay), began to organize the League of the Free Peoples. Artigas adopted a modified Belgrano flag with two narrow red stripes placed within blue fields. The blue stripes symbolized the banks of the Río de la Plata, while the red symbolized the struggle for federalism.

Later, Artigas changed the two red stripes to one diagonal one, to clearly distinguish his flags from similar flags of his opponents. The final design was not created directly by Artigas but by José María de Roo, a customs official from Montevideo and an expert in heraldry. De Roo likely served as a consultant to Artigas, though the exact nature of their collaboration and the extent of Artigas's influence on the design remain unclear The new flag was first raised at Artigas's military camp in Arerunguá on 13 January 1815. In Montevideo it was flown for the first time on 26 March by order of the military governor of Montevideo, Colonel Fernando Otorgués, and in Entre Ríos on 13 March. Over time, the flag spread throughout the League.

=== United Provinces of the Río de la Plata ===
Temporary flag (1816-1818)

Light blue flag (1818–1819 and 1820-1829)

Heraldic blue flag (1819–1820)

At the Congress of Tucumán, which proclaimed independence on 9 July 1816, the flag created by Manuel Belgrano was officially recognized as the symbol of the United Provinces of the Río de la Plata on 20 July 1816. At that point, the use of Spanish flags was abolished. The congress was attended by delegates from most of the former Viceroyalty (including Tarija and other northern territories, now part of Bolivia, but without delegations from provinces allied with the League of Free Peoples). A decree of 20 July, signed by Francisco Narciso de Laprida and Juan José Paso as Deputy Secretary, established that the previously used light blue and white flag would remain the national flag, used exclusively by armies, warships, and fortresses as a secondary flag. It also stated that once the most appropriate form of government had been determined, the final design of the main national flag would be established.

In early 1817, José de San Martín ordered his soldiers to take an oath to the flag of the Andes before setting out on an expedition to Chile.

On 9 July 1817, the privateer Hipólito Bouchard set off on a two-year voyage under his command. Bouchard, flying the flag of the United Provinces, fought a battle with Malay pirates in the Makassar Strait. After crossing into the Pacific, he attacked royalist forces from Monterey to El Realejo. The flag was used again in Central America a few years later by Manuel José Arce, becoming the basis for the flag of United Provinces of Central America. Another privateer who used the Argentine flag in Central America was Louis-Michel Aury, who occupied Providencia and Santa Catalina Islands.

On 25 January 1818, Juan Martín de Pueyrredón formally established the national flag, with the Sun of May as its central symbol. The May Sun added to the flag is based on the design of Argentina's first coin. It is a yellow-gold disc with a human face surrounded by 32 alternating rays – 16 straight and 16 wavy. Shortly thereafter, the official shade of blue was changed to heraldic blue, which remained in legal definitions until the color light blue was reestablished in the early 20th century. The session noted that "white and blue shall be the exclusive colors of this state, and on them shall be placed a golden embroidered sun." For naval purposes, a war flag was designated with two blue stripes, one white stripe, and a golden sun surrounded by stars. However, this flag was never used, as it was invalidated seven days later.

=== Federalist Party and Argentine Confederation ===
Turquoise blue (1829-1835)

With the rise to power in Buenos Aires of Brigadier General Juan Manuel de Rosas in 1829, the official shade of the national flag was modified to turquoise blue. The change stemmed partly from Rosas’s interpretation of the flag specifications approved by the Congress of Tucumán in 1818, and partly from his wish to differentiate it from the lighter blue commonly associated with the Unitarians, his opponents in the civil war. Although formally only governor of Buenos Aires Province, Rosas authority extended over the Argentine Confederation, a political union in which the provinces retained significant autonomy but delegated foreign affairs to Buenos Aires.

==== Rosas flag ====
Flag of the Argentine Confederation (1836-1852)

Example of a Federalist military flag

Argentine Confederation naval flag (1840s-1852)

In 1836 four Phrygian caps were placed in each corner, and the Sun of May was depicted in red, a color used by the federalists since the time of Artigas. The changes introduced by Rosas were not recorded in any law or decree, so it is presumed that they were simply Rosas's personal decision. Rosas also never established a special flag for the province of Buenos Aires. Federalist supporters often used these variants, both in official and military contexts. In combat, the Federal Army frequently carried dark blue versions of the Argentine flag, sometimes inscribed with slogans such as “¡Viva la Confederación! ¡Mueran los salvajes unitarios!” (“Long live the Confederation! Death to the savage Unitarians!”). In addition, some regiments used a red-and-white bicolor flag. By the late 1840s, especially in the northern provinces, where dissatisfaction with Rosas was growing but still respecting his dominance, flags bearing the slogan “¡Libertad, Constitución o Muerte!” (“Liberty, Constitution, or Death!”) appeared. In turn, units of the Grand Army commanded by Justo José de Urquiza used flags bearing the slogan “¡Constitución Federal o Muerte!” (“Federal Constitution or Death!”).

==== Urquiza flag ====
Flag of the Argentine Confederation (1852-1861)

Justo José de Urquiza, governor of Entre Ríos, assumed national leadership as president of the Argentine Confederation after defeating Rosas at the Battle of Caseros on 3 February 1852. Under Urquiza's leadership, the inland provinces abandoned Rosas' dark flag and reverted to using the light blue stripes with the golden Sun of May in the center.

=== Unitarian Party and State of Buenos Aires ===
During the Confederation era, Unitarian exiles in Montevideo continued to use light blue national flags and their own naval flags. These flags remained in use until 1852.

Light blue flag used by Unitarian Party on sea

Light blue flag used by Unitarian Party on sea
Flag of the State of Buenos Aires (1852-1861)

Buenos Aires naval ensign (1852-1861)

Buenos Aires merchant flag (1852-1861)

On 11 September 1852, the Unitarian Party carried out a bloodless coup in the province, which led to the creation of the State of Buenos Aires. The state effectively controlled only the coast of La Plata. Although Buenos Aires was then an independent state, with its own diplomatic relations, it tried to reintegrate with Argentina. The State of Buenos Aires used a flag consisting of two light blue stripes and a white one in the middle, where the Greater Coat of Arms of Argentina was located. It was replaced by the national flag with the unification of the country in 1861. Since then, no provincial flag has been used in Buenos Aires until the adoption of the current design. Buenos Aires warships continued to use the naval ensign previously used by the Unitary Party. This was the original light blue Argentine flag with an additional thin white stripe at the top.

=== Argentine Republic ===
The Sun of May as it appears on the Argentine flag. It has 32 rays, alternately straight and wavy, and the details are picked out in brown. The inner sun's diameter is 2/5 of the total figure's height, while the diameter of the sun equals 5/6 the height of the white stripe.

Buenos Aires and the Confederation clashed at the Battle of Pavón, which was won by the Unitarians in 1861. After this victory, Buenos Aires was reincorporated into the national structure, and Bartolomé Mitre assumed office as president of the united Argentine Republic in 1862. His rule ushered in a more centralized government, with Buenos Aires as its political and economic center.

In 1869, President Domingo Faustino Sarmiento authorized the display of flags on homes and buildings during national holidays, a practice that had previously been prohibited.

On 24 September 1873, during the unveiling of the Belgrano Monument in Buenos Aires, Sarmiento delivered his "Discourse on the Flag." In it, he rejected the former Confederate flags, calling them the invention of barbarians, tyrants, and traitors, and declared that they could not be considered the Argentine flag. The debate over the flag's colors resurfaced in 1878. Bartolomé Mitre argued for maintaining the Unitarian light blue and white, while Mariano A. Pelliza and C. Frigeiro argued that the original color of the 1818 flag was turquoise.

On 25 April 1884, President Julio Argentino Roca issued a decree that again restricted the use of the sun flag to government institutions. A year later, a blue and white flag was approved for the diplomatic corps. In 1895, President José Evaristo Uriburu established light blue and white as the official colors, a decision confirmed by President Figueroa Alcorta's decree of 24 May 1907. Further regulations were introduced in 1943 under the administration of Pedro Pablo Ramírez. Decrees 1027, 5256, and 6628, issued on 19 June 13 August, and 26 August of the same year, defined the design of the official national flag, the image of the sun, and the manner of wearing the sash. It stipulated that the national flag must always display the sun when flown by government offices, while private individuals were required to use it without the sun.

On 8 June 1938, president Roberto Ortiz sanctioned national law no. 12,361 declaring 20 June "Flag Day", a national holiday. The date was decided as the anniversary of Belgrano's death in 1820. In 1957 the National Flag Memorial (a 10,000 m^{2} monumental complex) was inaugurated in Rosario to commemorate the creation of the flag, and the official Flag Day ceremonies have customarily been conducted in its vicinity since then.

According to the Decree 10,302/1944 the article 2 stated that the Official Flag of the Nation is the flag with sun, approved by the "Congress of Tucumán", reunited in Buenos Aires on 25 February 1818. The article 3 stated that the flag with the sun in its center is to be used only by the Federal and Provincial Governments; while individuals and institutions use a flag without the sun.

In 1985 the Law 23,208 repealed the article 3 of the Decree 10,302/1944, saying that the Federal and Provincial Governments, as well as individuals have the right to use the Official Flag of the Nation.

In November 2010, the exact design specifications for the flag were standardized and promulgated via presidential decree, specifying the exact colors, proportions, and aspect ratio.

== Anthems to the flag ==
=== Aurora (Sunrise) ===
Alta en el cielo, un águila guerrera
Audaz se eleva en vuelo triunfal.
Azul un ala del color del cielo,
Azul un ala del color del mar.

Así en el alta aurora irradial.
Punta de flecha el áureo rostro imita.
Y forma estela el purpurado cuello.
El ala es paño, el águila es bandera.

Es la bandera de la patria mía,
del sol nacido que me ha dado Dios.
Es la bandera de la Patria Mía,
del sol nacido que me ha dado Dios.

High in the sky, a warrior eagle
rises audacious in its triumphal flight
One wing is blue, sky-colored;
one wing is blue, sea-colored.

In the high radiant aurora
its golden face resembles the tip of an arrow.
And its purple nape leaves a wake.
The wing is cloth, the eagle is a flag.

It is the flag of my Fatherland, born of the sun that God gave me.
It is the flag of my Fatherland, born of the sun that God gave me.

Lyrics by Luigi Illica and Héctor Cipriano Quesada, music by Héctor Panizza, it is sung during flag raising ceremonies.

=== Saludo a la bandera (Salutation to the Flag) ===
Salve, argentina
bandera azul y blanca.
Jirón del cielo
en donde impera el Sol.
Tú, la más noble,
la más gloriosa y santa,
el firmamento su color te dio.

Yo te saludo,
bandera de mi Patria,
sublime enseña
de libertad y honor.
Jurando amarte,
como así defenderte,
mientras palpite mi fiel corazón.

Hail, Argentina
blue and white flag.
Shred of the sky
where the Sun reigns.
You, the most noble,
the most glorious and holy,
the heavens gave its color to you.

I salute you,
flag of my fatherland,
sublime ensign
of freedom and honor.
Swearing to love you,
as well as to defend you,
for as long as my faithful heart beats.

=== Mi Bandera (My Flag) ===
Aquí está la bandera idolatrada,
la enseña que Belgrano nos legó,
cuando triste la Patria esclavizada
con valor sus vínculos rompió.

Aquí está la bandera esplendorosa
que al mundo con sus triunfos admiró,
cuando altiva en la lucha y victoriosa
la cima de los Andes escaló.

Aquí está la bandera que un día
en la batalla tremoló triunfal
y, llena de orgullo y bizarría,
a San Lorenzo se dirigió inmortal.

Aquí está, como el cielo refulgente,
ostentando sublime majestad,
después de haber cruzado el Continente,
exclamando a su paso: ¡Libertad!
¡Libertad! ¡Libertad!

Here is the idolized flag,
the flag that Belgrano left to us,
when the sad enslaved Homeland
bravely broke its bonds.

Here is the splendorous flag
that surprised the world with its victory,
when arrogant and victoriously during the battles
the top of the Andes it has climbed.

Here is the flag that one day
triumphantly rose in the middle of the battle
and, full of pride and gallantry,
to San Lorenzo it went immortal.

Here it is, like the shining sky,
showing sublimate majesty
after having crossed the continent
shouting in its way: "Freedom!"
"Freedom! Freedom!"

== Pledge to the Flag ==
As Flag Day is celebrated on 20 June, the following pledge is recited to students nationwide on this day by their respective school principals or grade level advisers. In large towns where students are gathered en masse, the pledge is taken by the local town or city executive, preceded by words of advice and honor to the memory of its creator, Manuel Belgrano, using the following or similar formulas:

=== Traditional Pledge ===
Summons: Niños/Alumnos, la Bandera blanca y celeste—Dios sea loado—no ha sido atada jamás al carro triunfal de ningún vencedor de la tierra. Niños/Alumnos, esa Bandera gloriosa representa a la Patria de los Argentinos. Prometáis rendirle vuestro más sincero y respetuoso homenaje, quererla con amor inmenso y formarle, desde la aurora de la vida un culto fervoroso e imborrable en vuestros corazones; preparándonos desde la escuela para practicar a su tiempo, con toda pureza y honestidad, las nobles virtudes inherentes a la ciudadanía, estudiar con empeño la historia de nuestro país y la de sus grandes benefactores a fin de seguir sus huellas luminosas y a fin también de honrar la Bandera y de que no se amortigüe jamás en vuestras almas el delicado y generoso sentimiento de amor a la Patria. En una palabra: ¿prometéis lo que esté en las medidas de vuestras fuerzas que la Bandera Argentina flamee por siempre sobre nuestras murallas y fortalezas, en lo alto de los mástiles de nuestras naves y a la cabeza de nuestras legiones y para que el honor sea su aliento, la gloria su aureola, la justicia su empresa? Response: ¡Sí, prometo!	Summons: Children/Students, the white and sky-blue flag, God be praised, has never been carried in the triumphal carts of any victors of this Earth. Children/Students, this glorious Flag represents the Fatherland of the Argentines. I ask you all to promise to pledge your most sincere and respectful homage, to love it and nurture, with immense love, from the dawn of life a fervent and indelible cult in your hearts; preparing yourselves from school to practice in its time, with all purity and honesty, the noble virtues inherent in citizenship, studying with determination the history of our country and that of its big benefactors, in order to continue its luminous traces and as a way to honor the Flag so that there should never get depressed in your souls the delicate and generous feeling of love for the Fatherland. In one word: do you promise, to the extent of your capabilities, that the Flag of Argentina flames forever over our walls and forts, on top of the masts of our ships and at the head of our legions and so that honor should be its breath, glory its aurora, justice its company? Response: Yes, I promise! (standing to attention and extending the right arm towards the flag)

Versions of this include references to Belgrano and to all who fought for the country during the Argentine War of Independence and other wars that followed.

=== Modern Pledge ===
Summons: Niños/Alumnos, esta es la Bandera que creó Manuel Belgrano en los albores de nuestra libertad, simboliza a la República Argentina, nuestra Patria. Es el símbolo de nuestra libre soberanía, que hace sagrados a los hombres y mujeres y a todos los pueblos del mundo. Convoca el ejercicio de nuestros deberes y nuestros derechos, a respetar las leyes y las instituciones. Es la expresión de nuestra historia forjada con la esperanza y el esfuerzo de millones de hombres y mujeres, los que nacieron en nuestra tierra y los que vinieron a poblarla al amparo de nuestra bandera y nuestra Constitución. Representa nuestra tierra y nuestros mares, nuestros ríos y bosques, nuestros llanos y montañas, el esfuerzo de sus habitantes, sus sueños y realizaciones. Simboliza nuestro presente, en el que, día a día, debemos construir la democracia que nos ennoblece, y conquistar el conocimiento que nos libera; y nuestro futuro, el de nuestros hijos y el de las sucesivas generaciones de argentinos. Niños/Alumnos, ¿prometen defenderla, respetarla y amarla, con fraterna tolerancia y respeto, estudiando con firme voluntad, comprometiéndose a ser ciudadanos libres y justos, aceptando solidariamente en sus diferencias a todos los que pueblan nuestro suelo y transmitiendo, en todos y cada uno de nuestros actos, sus valores permanentes e irrenunciables? Response: Sí, prometo!	Summons: Children/Students, this is the Flag that Manuel Belgrano created at the dawn of our freedom; the symbol of our fatherland, the Argentine Republic. It is the symbol of our free sovereignty, which renders sacred the men and women and all the peoples of the world. It calls on us to exercise our duties and our rights, to respect our nation's laws and institutions. It is the expression of our history forged with the hope and the efforts of millions of men and women, those who were born in our land and those who came to settle it under our flag and our Constitution. It represents our land and our seas, our rivers and forests, our plains and mountains, the efforts of its inhabitants, their dreams and achievements. It symbolizes our present, in which, day by day, we must build the democracy that ennobles us and conquer the knowledge that frees us, as well as our future, that of our children and the successive generations of Argentines. Children/Students, do you promise to defend, respect, and love it, with fraternal tolerance and respect, studying with determination, committing to be free and honest citizens, accepting in solidarity the diversity of all those who inhabit our lands, and passing on these permanent and irrevocable values in everything you do? Response: Yes, I promise! (standing to attention and extending the right arm towards the flag)

The Glorious Reveille may be sounded by a military or a marching band at this point, and confetti may be showered upon the students.

In the Armed Forces of the Argentine Republic and civil uniformed services the pledge is similar but with a different formula and response of ¡Si, juro! (Yes, I pledge!)

=== Military/police variant ===
Summons: ¿Juráis a la Patria seguir constantemente su bandera y defenderla hasta perder la vida? Response: ¡Sí, juro!	Summons: Do you therefore pledge to the Fatherland constantly to follow its flag and defend it even at the cost of your lives? Response: Yes, I pledge!

In the Argentine Federal Police, the words y su Constitución Nacional (and its Constitution) may be inserted.

== See also ==
- List of Argentine flags
- Spanish fess
- Flag of El Salvador
- Flag of Honduras
- Flag of Nicaragua
