= Cabildo de Luján =

Coordinates: 34°33′47″S 59°07′18″W

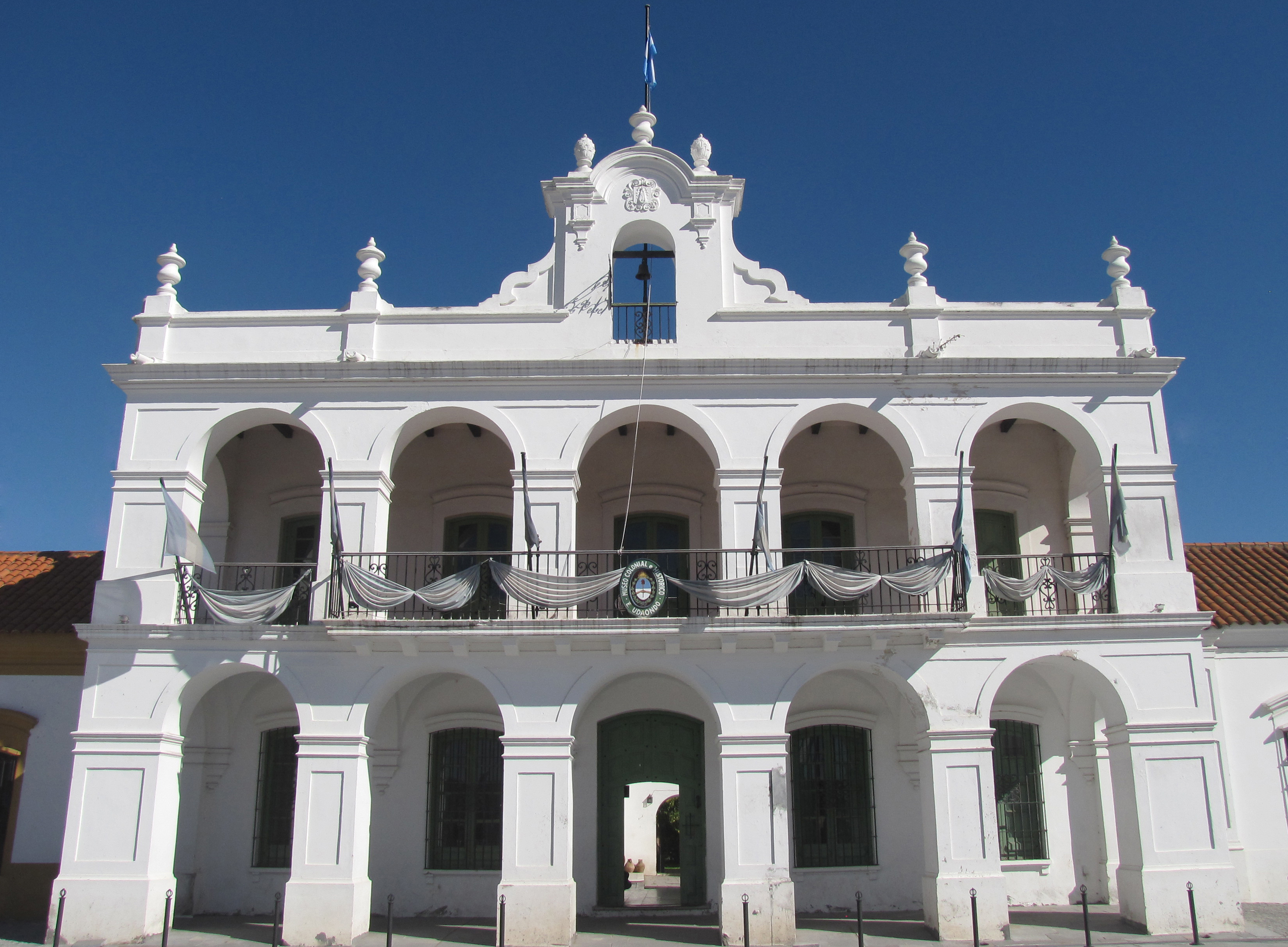
Facade of the building, 2009

The Cabildo de Luján is a historic building located in the city of Luján, Argentina, built to serve the regional government of the same name. It served as a government for the region around Luján during the colonial era, and remained the municipal center for the city until 1910. It is the only cabildo still standing in the province of Buenos Aires, and one of five in Argentina. The building contains a museum, the largest in Argentina, housing around 70,000 museum pieces, and a large archive house.

== History ==
The Cabildo de Luján was created as an institution in 1756. The building housing the Cabildo began construction in 1792 and was completed in 1800. The Cabildo of Luján was the first in the country to recognize the rebel Primera Junta, which would go on to become the first government of an independent Argentina. Beginning in the late 19th century, the building was used as a site for festivals and gatherings. The Cabildo functioned as the center for Luján's police force and municipal government until 1910, after which point the city relocated these services to a building along the Calle San Martín. The building, now abandoned, was proposed for demolition alongside all structures with its block as part of a plan by the city to increase park space. The efforts of Domingo Fernández Beschtedt to preserve the building prevented this from occurring. The building opened to the public as a museum in 1923, which attracted religious pilgrims who visited the city, which had just inaugurated the Basilica of Our Lady of Luján a few years earlier. Ownership of the building was assumed by Enrique Udaondo upon its conversion into a museum, who expressed his desire to store documents from the Cabildo meetings during the colonial period in the building.
