= Enzo Martínez (swimmer) =

Uruguayan swimmer (born 1994)

Personal information
- Born: 15 August 1994 (age 31)

Sport
- Sport: Swimming
Medal record
Men's swimming
Representing Uruguay
South American Championships
Gold medal – first place	2021 Buenos Aires	50 m freestyle

Enzo Martínez Scarpe (born 15 August 1994), also written as Enzo Martínez-Scarpe , is a Uruguayan swimmer.

== Early life ==
Originally from Maldonado, Martínez was diagnosed with asthma as a child and took up swimming at the suggestion of a doctor. He enrolled at the University of Florida in 2014, where he swam for the Gators and competed alongside Caeleb Dressel.

== Career ==
He competed in the men's 100 metre freestyle event at the 2017 World Aquatics Championships.

In 2019, he represented Uruguay at the 2019 World Aquatics Championships held in Gwangju, South Korea and finished in 47th place in the heats of the men's 50 metre freestyle event. In the men's 100 metre freestyle he finished in 62nd place in the heats. At the 2021 South American Swimming Championships, Martínez became the first Uruguayan to medal at the event in more than thirty years when he took gold in the 50 metre freestyle — breaking a national record in the process.

== See also ==
- List of Uruguayan records in swimming
