= Cathedral Basilica of the Holy Saviour, San Salvador de Jujuy =

Cathedral Basilica of the Holy Saviour
- Catedral Basílica de San Salvador de Jujuy
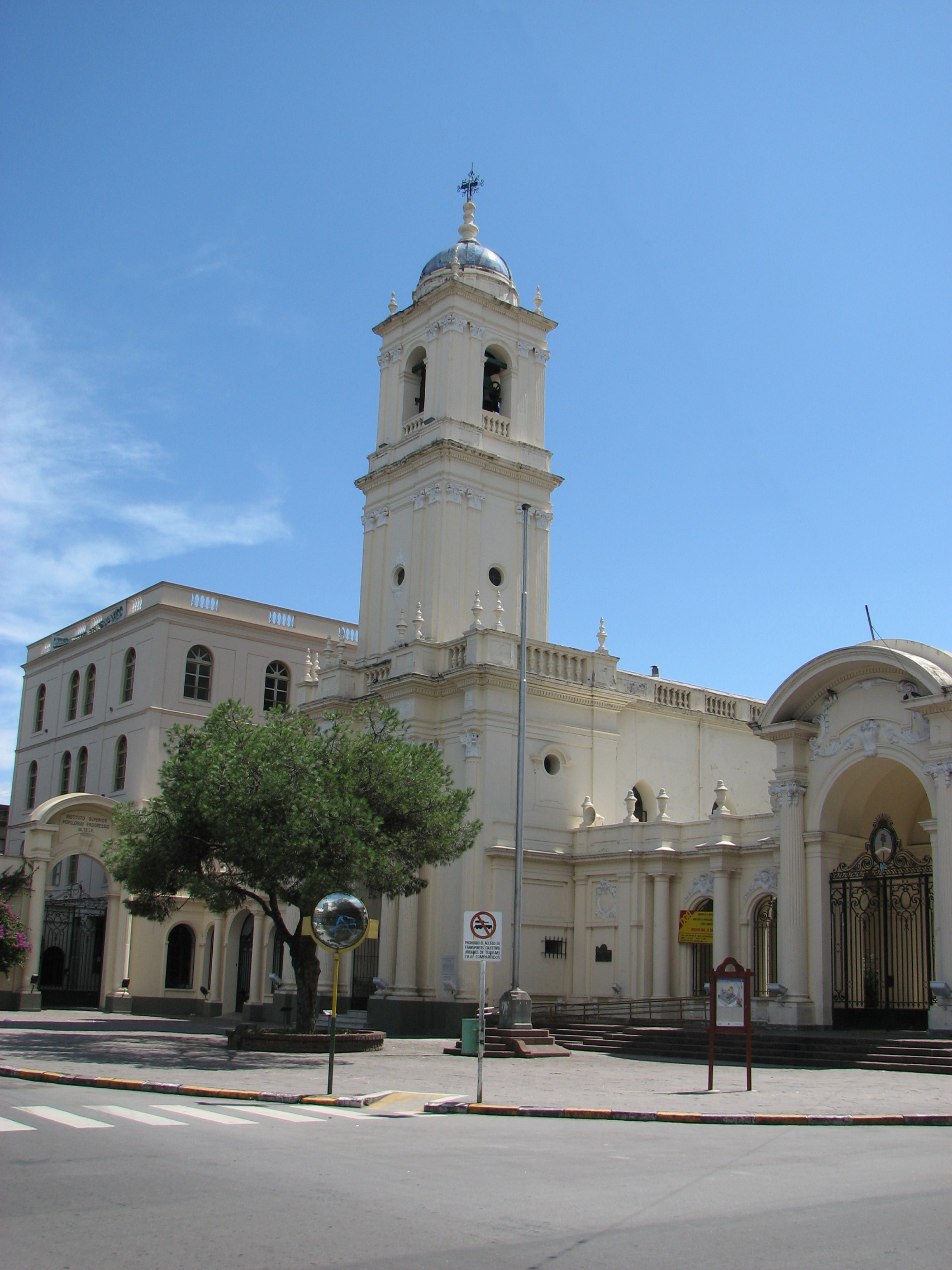
- Cathedral Basilica of the Holy Saviour
- 24.1852°S 65.3036°W
- Location: San Salvador de Jujuy
- Country: Argentina
- Denomination: Roman Catholic Church

The Cathedral Basilica of the Holy Saviour (Spanish: Catedral Basílica de San Salvador de Jujuy) Also San Salvador de Jujuy Cathedral Is the seat of the Catholic bishopric of the city of San Salvador de Jujuy in Argentina, as well as a historic building of the country. The work was declared National Historical Monument by Decree No. 1347 of May 16, 1931.

It is undoubtedly a masterpiece of the Spanish colonial style of the eighteenth century. Several religious buildings were built before the present cathedral building, but were erected with materials too fragile and none resisted for a long time. It was in 1736 that the last of them was declared out of commission, and the construction of the work we know today took place. Without an exact date, it is believed that the present building was consecrated and opened between 1761 and 1765. Since then there have been minor modifications in the late nineteenth and twentieth centuries.

It was in this cathedral that the new Argentine flag, created by Manuel Belgrano, was blessed on May 25, 1812. Shortly thereafter, the troops and the population of the city, gathered in front of the Cabildo and swore loyalty before her. This fact is today perpetuated by a painting by Luis De Servi, made for the centenary of the event and placed on one of the walls of the cathedral.

In it is venerated Our Lady of the Rosary of Paypaya and White River, declared in 1812 "Patron of the Armies of the North", used in the liberation of the country.

== See also ==
- Roman Catholicism in Argentina
- Holy Saviour

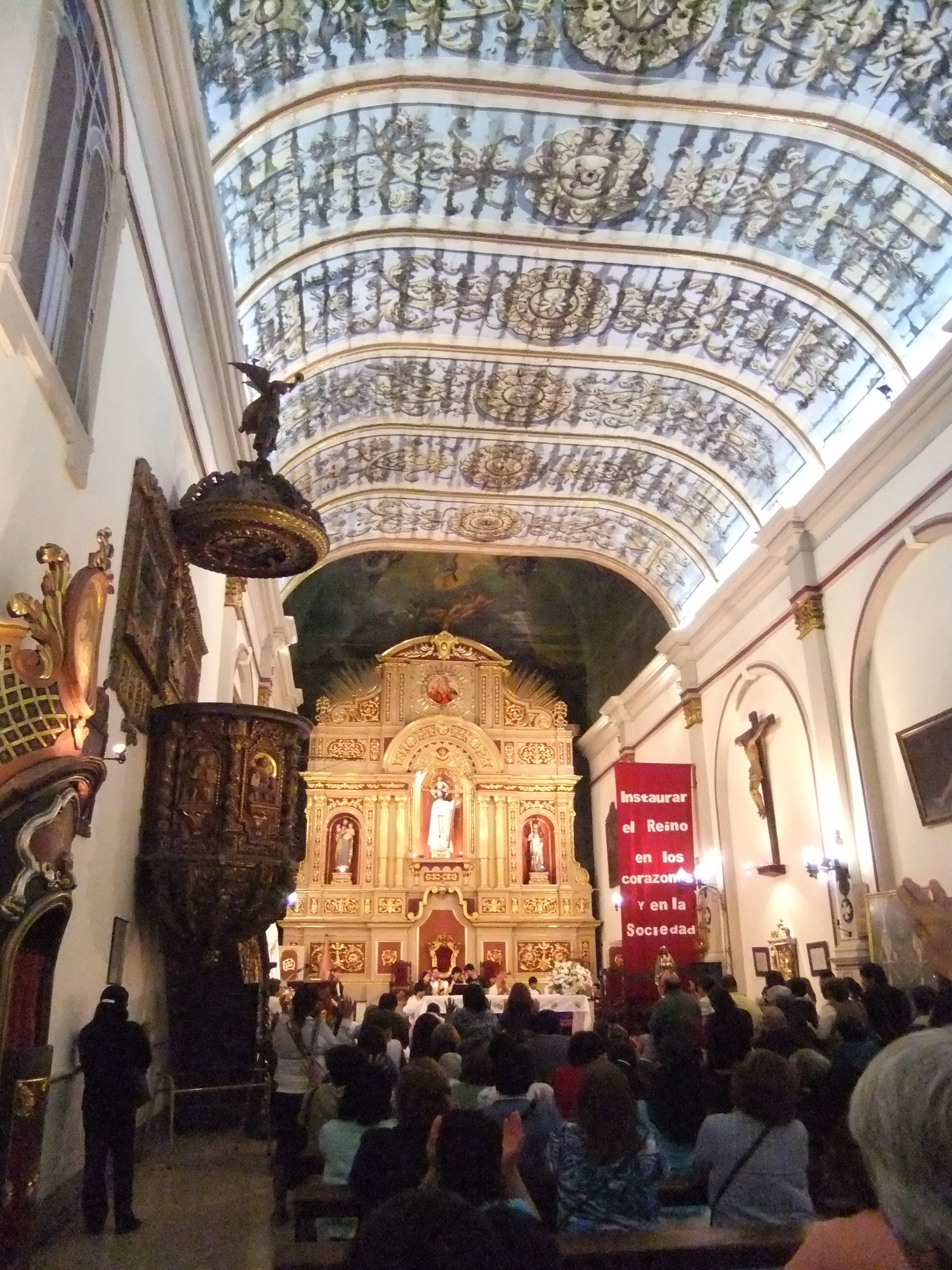
Internal view
