= Leo Nolles =

Uruguayan swimmer (born 2003)

Personal information
- Born: 12 April 2003 (age 22)

Sport
- Sport: Swimming
- Strokes: Freestyle

Leo Nolles (born 12 April 2003) is a Uruguayan swimmer. He represented Uruguay in the 100 metre freestyle event at the 2024 Summer Olympics.

== Life ==
Nolles grew up in Maldonado. He is a student at the University of Northern Michigan and made his debut at a major international event during the 2023 World Aquatics Championships.
