= Nicole Frank =

Uruguayan swimmer (born 2003)

Personal information
- Born: 8 September 2003 (age 22)

Sport
- Sport: Swimming

Nicole Frank (born 8 September 2003) is a Uruguayan swimmer.

Frank trained to swim at Club Atlético Olimpia in Montevideo. In 2019, she represented Uruguay at the World Aquatics Championships held in Gwangju, South Korea. She competed in the women's 200 metre freestyle event and she did not advance to compete in the semi-finals. She also competed in the women's 200 metre individual medley event.

She qualified to the 2020 Summer Olympics under the universality quota, where she did 2'18.93 at the 200 metre individual medley heat race. In 2021, she also competed in the women's 200 metre backstroke and women's 200 metre individual medley events at the 2021 FINA World Swimming Championships (25 m) held in Abu Dhabi, United Arab Emirates.

She also competed at the 2022 World Aquatics Championships held in Budapest, Hungary. She competed in the women's 100 metre breaststroke and women's 200 metre individual medley events.
