= Inés Remersaro =

Uruguayan swimmer (born 1992)

Inés Remersaro OLY
Personal information
- Full name: Inés Remersaro Coronel
- Nationality: Uruguay
- Born: December 2, 1992 (age 33) Montevideo, Uruguay
- Height: 1.65 m (5 ft 5 in)
- Weight: 57 kg (126 lb)

Sport
- Sport: Swimming
- Strokes: Backstroke
- Club: Club Biguá

Inés Remersaro Coronel (born December 2, 1992) is an Olympic backstroke swimmer from Uruguay.

Remersaro competed at the 2011 Pan American Games in the Women's 100 metre backstroke and at the Women's 200 metre backstroke, finishing 20th and 16th respectively.

She also competed at the 2012 Summer Olympics in the Women's 100 metre backstroke, finishing in 43rd place in the heats, failing to qualify for the semifinals.

In 2019, she represented Uruguay at the 2019 World Aquatics Championships held in Gwangju, South Korea. She competed in the women's 50 metre freestyle and women's 100 metre freestyle events. In both events she did not advance to compete in the semi-finals.
