= Martin Melconian =

Uruguayan swimmer (born 1990)

Martín Melconian
Personal information
- Full name: Martín Andrés Melconian Álvez
- Born: 2 January 1990 (age 36)

Sport
- Sport: Swimming

Martín Andrés Melconian Álvez (born 2 January 1990) is a Uruguayan swimmer. He competed in the men's 100 metre breaststroke event at the 2016 Summer Olympics. His brother Gabriel Melconian is also an Olympic freestyler swimmer.

In 2019, he represented Uruguay at the 2019 World Aquatics Championships held in Gwangju, South Korea and he competed in the men's 50 metre breaststroke and men's 100 metre breaststroke events.
