= Flag of Uruguay =

Oriental Republic of Uruguay
- Pabellón nacional ('National Pavilion')
- Use: National flag and ensign
- Proportion: 2:3
- Adopted: 18 December 1828; 197 years ago (first design); 11 July 1830; 196 years ago (modification)
- Design: Four horizontal stripes of blue with the upper hoist-side corner bearing the Sun of May in the centre over a white canvas.
- Designed by: Joaquín Suárez

The national flag of Uruguay (bandera nacional de Uruguay), officially known as the National Pavilion (Pabellón Nacional), is the most important of the three official flags of Uruguay along with the Artigas flag and the flag of the Treinta y Tres. It has a field of nine equal horizontal stripes alternating white and blue. The canton is white, charged with the Sun of May, from which 16 rays extend, alternating between triangular and wavy. The flag was first adopted by law on 18 December 1828, and had 19 alternating stripes of white and blue until 11 July 1830, when a new law reduced the number of alternating stripes to nine. The flag was designed by Joaquín Suárez.

== Symbolism and design ==
Sun of May

The horizontal stripes on the flag represent the nine original departments of Uruguay, based on the U.S. flag, where the stripes represent the original 13 colonies. The first flag designed in 1828 had 9 light blue stripes; this number was reduced to 4 in 1830 due to visibility problems from distance. These stripes of blue and white were inspired by the flag of Argentina, making the flag of Uruguay part of both the Stars and Stripes and Belgrano flag families.

The golden Sun of May represents the May Revolution of 1810; It also appears on the flag of Argentina

=== Colors ===
The specific color hues of the flag are not officially defined by law. However, most representations use the following:

| Uruguay | Yellow | Brown | Blue | White |
|---|---|---|---|---|
| RGB | 252-209-22 | 123-63-0 | 0-56-168 | 255-255-255 |
| Hexadecimal | #FCD116 | #7B3F00 | #0038A8 | #FFFFFF |
| CMYK | 0-17-91-1 | 0-49-100-52 | 100-67-0-34 | 0-0-0-0 |

=== Co-official flags ===
The National Pavilion is first on the list of national symbols, but Uruguay also has two other official flags. These are symbols used during the liberation wars against Spain and Brazil in the early 19th century. The two flags known as the Artigas flag and the Flag of the Treinta y Tres were declared official on 18 February 1952.

Artigas flag

Flag of the Treinta y Tres

== History ==
=== League of the Free Peoples and Eastern Provinces ===
One of the early flags of the League of the Free Peoples (c. 1815)

One of the early flags of the League of the Free Peoples (c. 1815)

Flag of the League of the Free Peoples (1815-1817)

Flag of the Eastern Provinces (1815-1817)

The current flag is derived from the flags used by the Patriot party during the dissolution of the Spanish Empire in America. In the region of present-day Uruguay, the first patriotic flag was introduced in 1814 by José Gervasio Artigas, the organizer of the League of the Free Peoples. The Artigas flag used the white stripe between two blue stripes from the flag created in 1812 by Manuel Belgrano for the Army of the North commanded by him in the service of the United Provinces. Artigas added red to the flag to symbolize the fight for federalism. From 1815 the main flag of the League had a red bend, but the individual provinces belonging to the league used their own combinations of blue, white and red. Uruguay, then called the Eastern Province because it covers the eastern bank of the Uruguay River, began using a horizontal tricolor of red on the top, white in the middle, and blue on the bottom. The flag of the Eastern Province was introduced in 1815 by Fernando Otorgués, the military governor of Montevideo, although a version now rejected by historians mentions that the flag was initially red on the top, blue in the middle, and white on the bottom. In 1816, the Kingdom of Brazil invaded the territory of the Eastern Province, and annexed it as the Cisplatine Province in 1821.

=== Cisplatine War ===
Flag of the Provincia Cisplatina (1820-1828)

Flag of the Treinta y Tres

Flag of the Eastern Provinces (1825-1828)

During this period of Brazilian control, the provincial flag was in force, consisting of a white horizontal stripe between two green ones. The white field featured a coat of arms based on the symbols of the Portuguese monarchy, encompassing the armillary sphere and the cross of the Order of Christ. At the same time, the previous flag of the Eastern Province returned, associated with the independence movement. On 19 April 1825, a group of revolutionaries known as the Thirty-Three Orientals planted a tricolor flag on Agraciada Beach with the words "Libertad o Muerte" ("Liberty or Death") painted in the center. Shortly thereafter, the Uruguayans declared independence from Brazil and joined the United Provinces, which began the Cisplatine War. During the same deliberations as the declaration, the Flag Law was adopted, stipulating that the flag of the Eastern Province would be "light blue, white, and crimson" until it was re-recognized as a province of the United Provinces of the Río de la Plata. According to the Flag Law, after the Eastern Province's reintegration, the Argentine flag would officially fly over the province's public buildings. For almost three years of war, both sides used different flags.

=== Pabellón Nacional ===
National flag (1828-1830)

On 28 August 1828, the Preliminary Peace Convention was signed, establishing Uruguay as an independent state. The convention stipulated that the inhabitants of the Banda Oriental would elect a provisional governor and a Constitutional Assembly. The first meetings were held in San José de Mayo and continued in Villa Guadalupe (present-day Canelones). It was there that provisional governor Joaquín Suárez expressed the need for a new national flag, as until then they had been using the flag of the Eastern Province.

The new flag was approved on 16 December 1828. The national flag was defined as white with nine horizontal, alternating light blue stripes, leaving a white square in the upper corner, on the hoisting side, in which the Sun of May would be placed. The nine light blue stripes represented the departments into which Uruguayan territory was then divided: Canelones, Cerro Largo, Colonia, Durazno, Maldonado, Montevideo, Paysandú, San José, and Soriano.

Shortly before the Constitution's swearing-in date, a motion was submitted to the Constitutional Assembly to reduce the number of stripes from the de facto nineteen to four blue and five white. The change was also argued to be due to the fact that the dense stripes made the flag indistinct from a distance. The formal change to the flag took place on 11 July 1830, by statute, and the new flag was already in force at the ceremonial swearing-in of the Constitution of 1830.

Flag of the Gobierno de la Defensa (1840s)

Flag of the Gobierno del Cerrito (1840s)

During the Uruguayan Civil War, rival governments used flags with varying shades of blue. Forces loyal to the National Party, under the command of Manuel Oribe, used a very dark blue version. In contrast, forces loyal to the Colorado Party defending besieged Montevideo, commanded by Fructuoso Rivera, used a light blue version. This situation was a reflection of the dark blue flags of the Federalist Party and the light blue flags of the Unitarian Party, which were fighting a war for domination in Argentina and supporting their partners in Uruguay.

The final change was introduced by a decree of 18 February 1952. It officially specified that the sun's design would be a radiant circle with a face, surrounded by 16 rays. Before 1952, it was traditionally depicted with a face, although this was not formalized. This decree also established the official status of the Artigas flag and the flag of the Treinta y Tres.

== Protocol ==
In accordance with Law No. 9,935 of June 14, 1940, in all public and private educational institutes "the Pledge of Allegiance to the Flag will be solemnly performed on June 19." Likewise, Article 28 of the Law No. 9,943, establishes that every natural or legal citizen of Uruguay must take an Pledge of Allegiance to the National Flag.

On June 19 of each year, the Promise of Allegiance to the Flag is taken for first-year primary school children and the Pledge of Allegiance to the Flag is taken for first-year secondary school children.

Public educational institutes that do not carry out the ceremony may be subject to administrative sanctions and private ones may be fined. The lack of the Pledge of Allegiance to the flag carries sanctions such as the impossibility of issuing professional or technical titles, and access to work in the public service.

Promise of Allegiance
| Summons: ¿Prometéis respetar y honrar esta Bandera que representa la dignidad, la soberanía y la gloriosa historia de nuestra Patria, la República Oriental del Uruguay? Response: ¡Sí, prometo! | Summons: Do you promise to respect and honor this Flag that represents the dignity, sovereignty and glorious history of our Homeland, the Oriental Republic of Uruguay? Response: Yes, I promise! |

Pledge of Allegiance
| Summons: ¿Juráis honrar vuestra Patria, con la práctica constante de una vida digna, consagrada al ejercicio del bien para vosotros y vuestros semejantes; defender con sacrificio de vuestra vida, si fuere preciso, la Constitución y las Leyes de la República, el honor y la integridad de la Nación y sus instituciones democráticas, todo lo cual simboliza esta Bandera? Response: ¡Sí, prometo! | Summons: Do you swear to honor your Country, with the constant practice of a dignified life, dedicated to the exercise of good for yourselves and your fellow men; defend with the sacrifice of your life, if necessary, the Constitution and the Laws of the Republic, the honor and integrity of the Nation and its democratic institutions, all of which this Flag symbolizes? Response: Yes, I swear! |

== Gallery ==
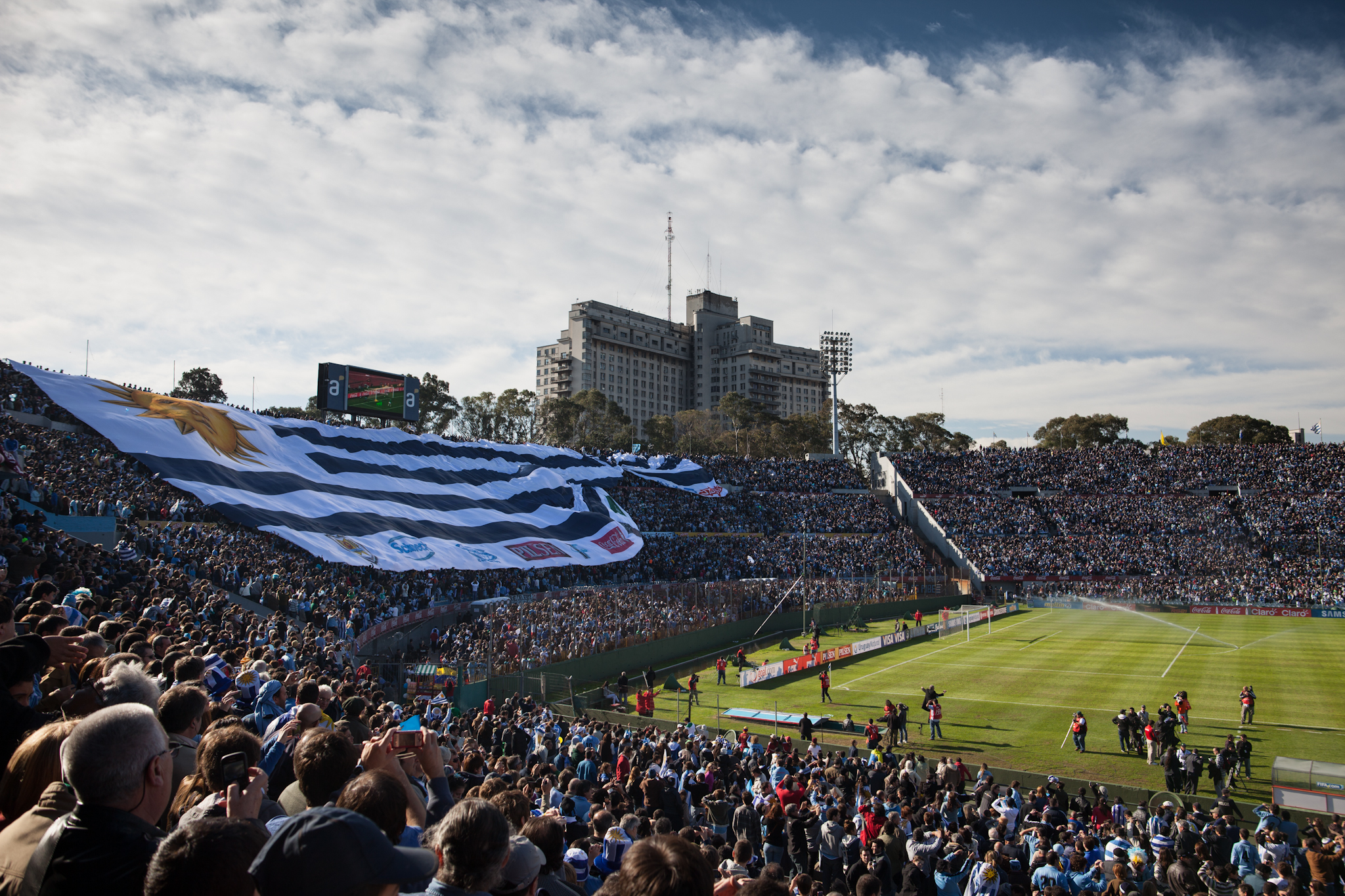
Flag in the historical Estadio Centenario, Montevideo.

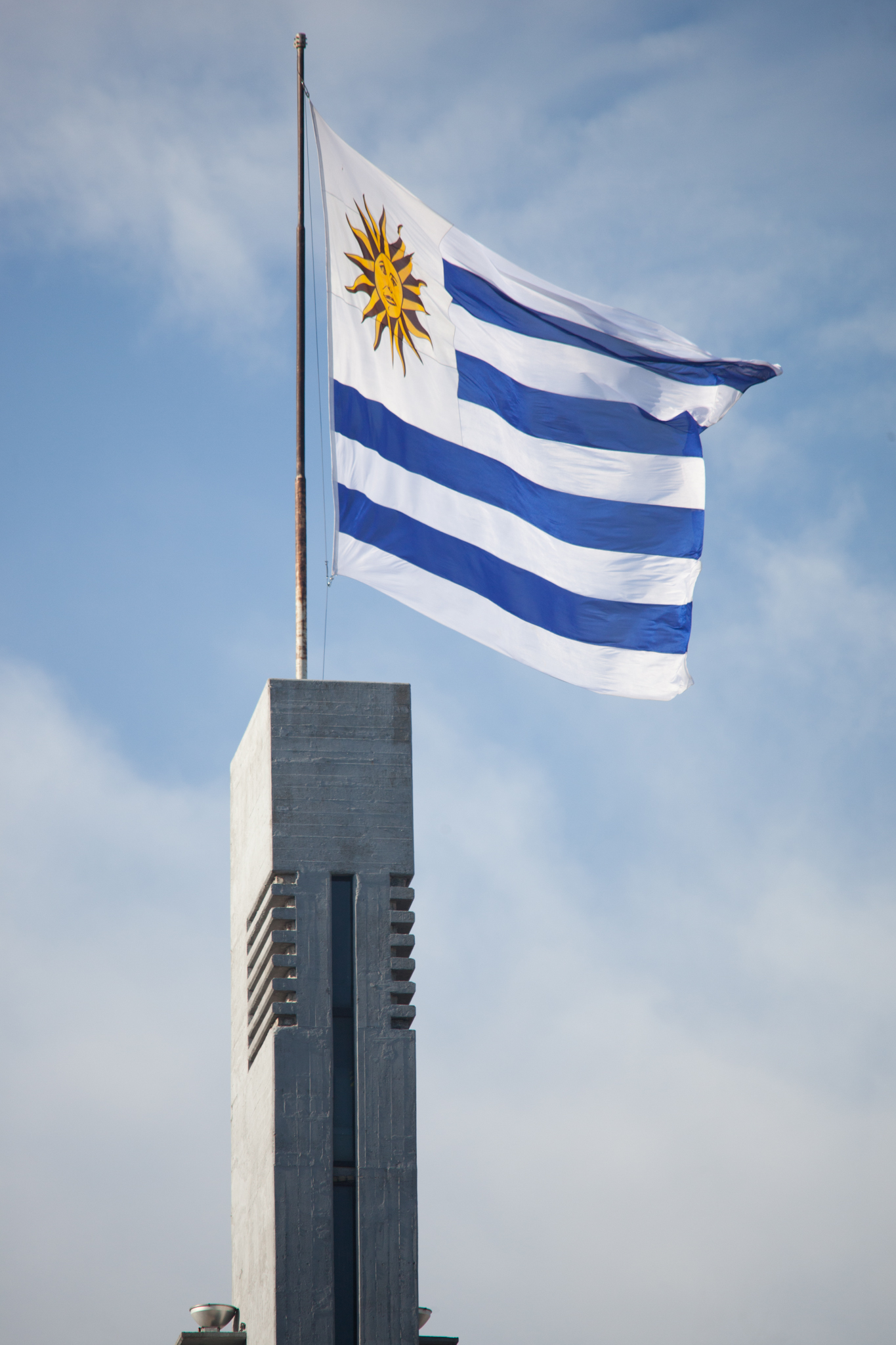
Flag in the Estadio Centenario

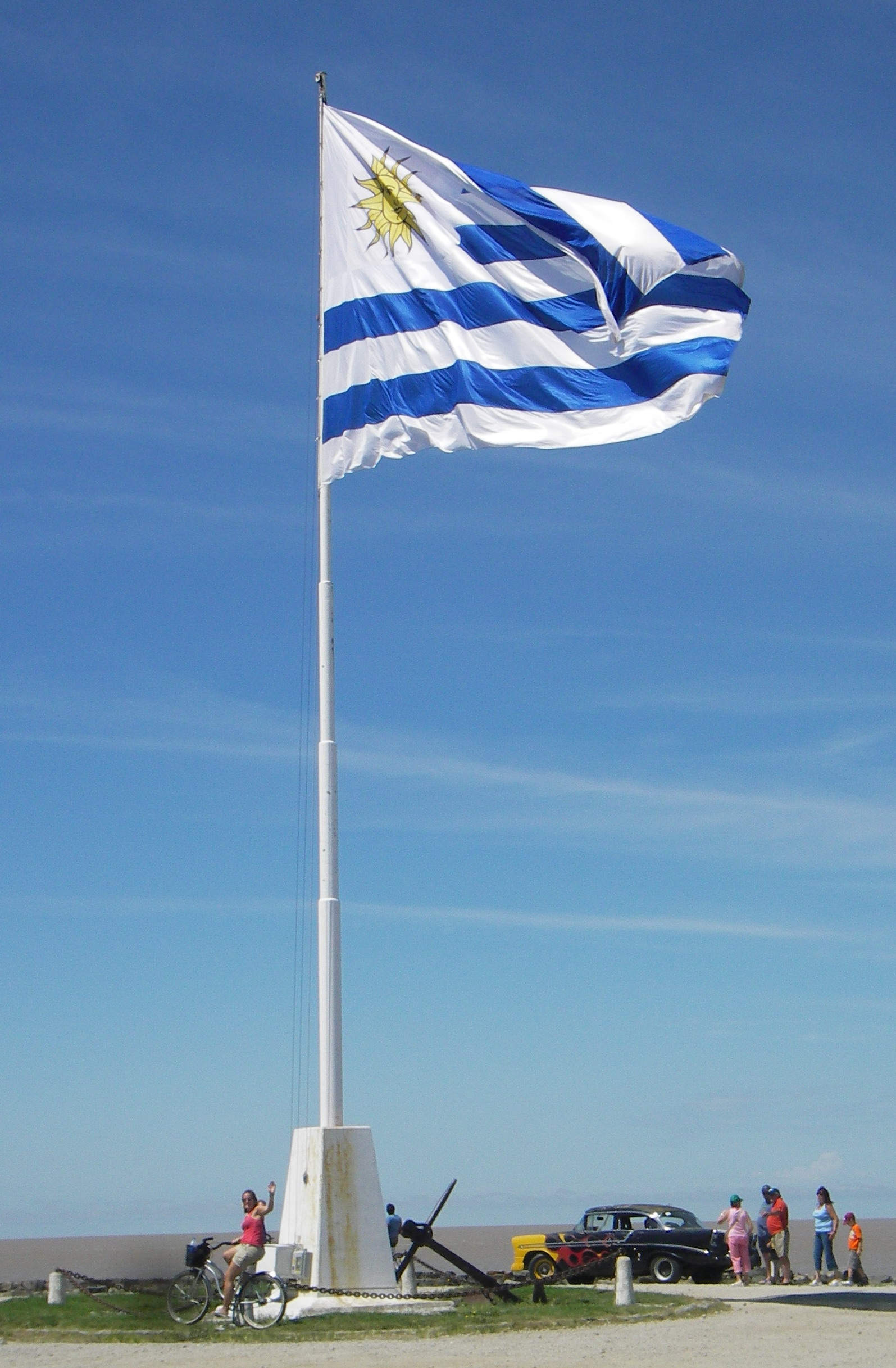
Flag in Colonia del Sacramento

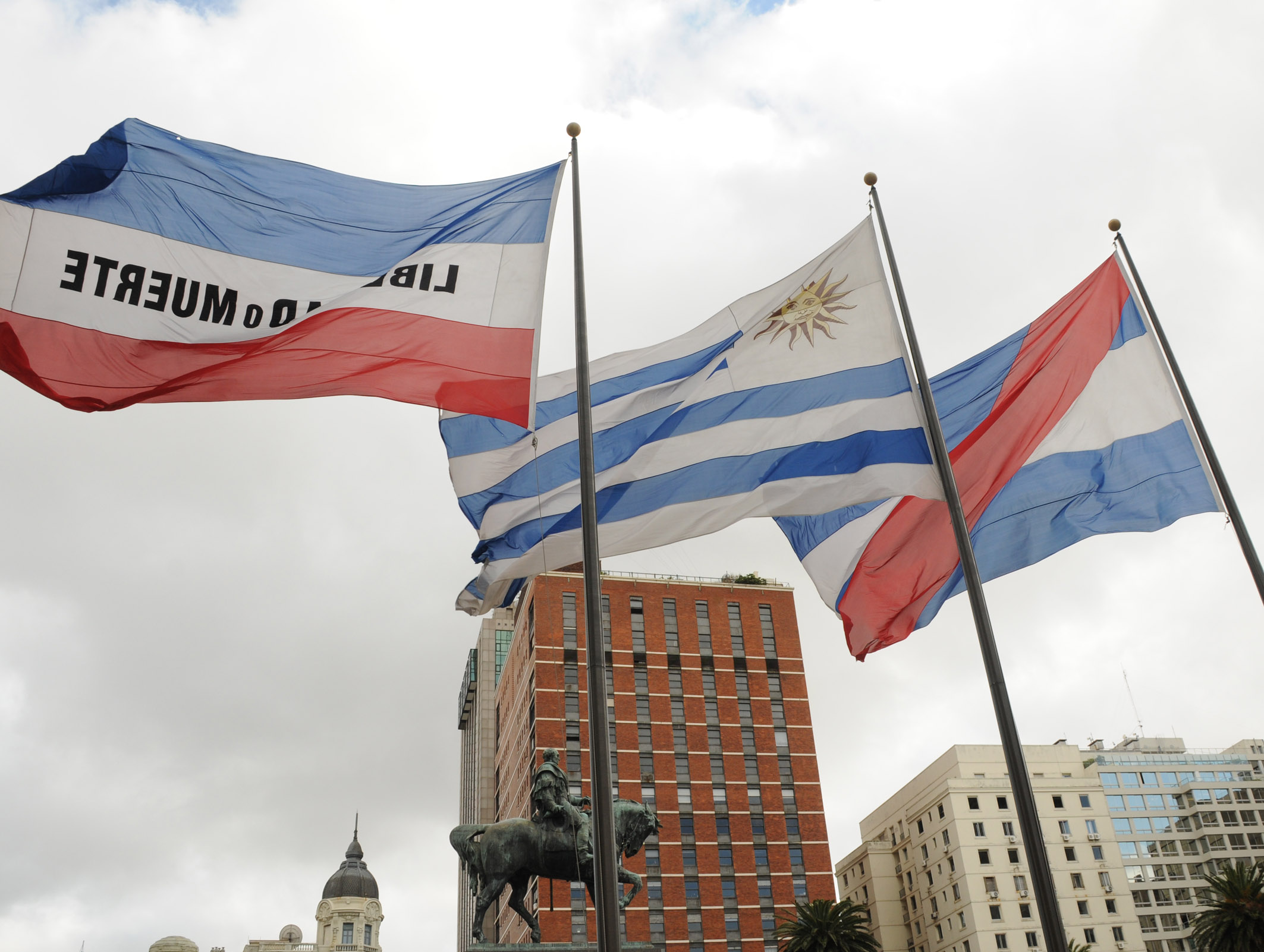

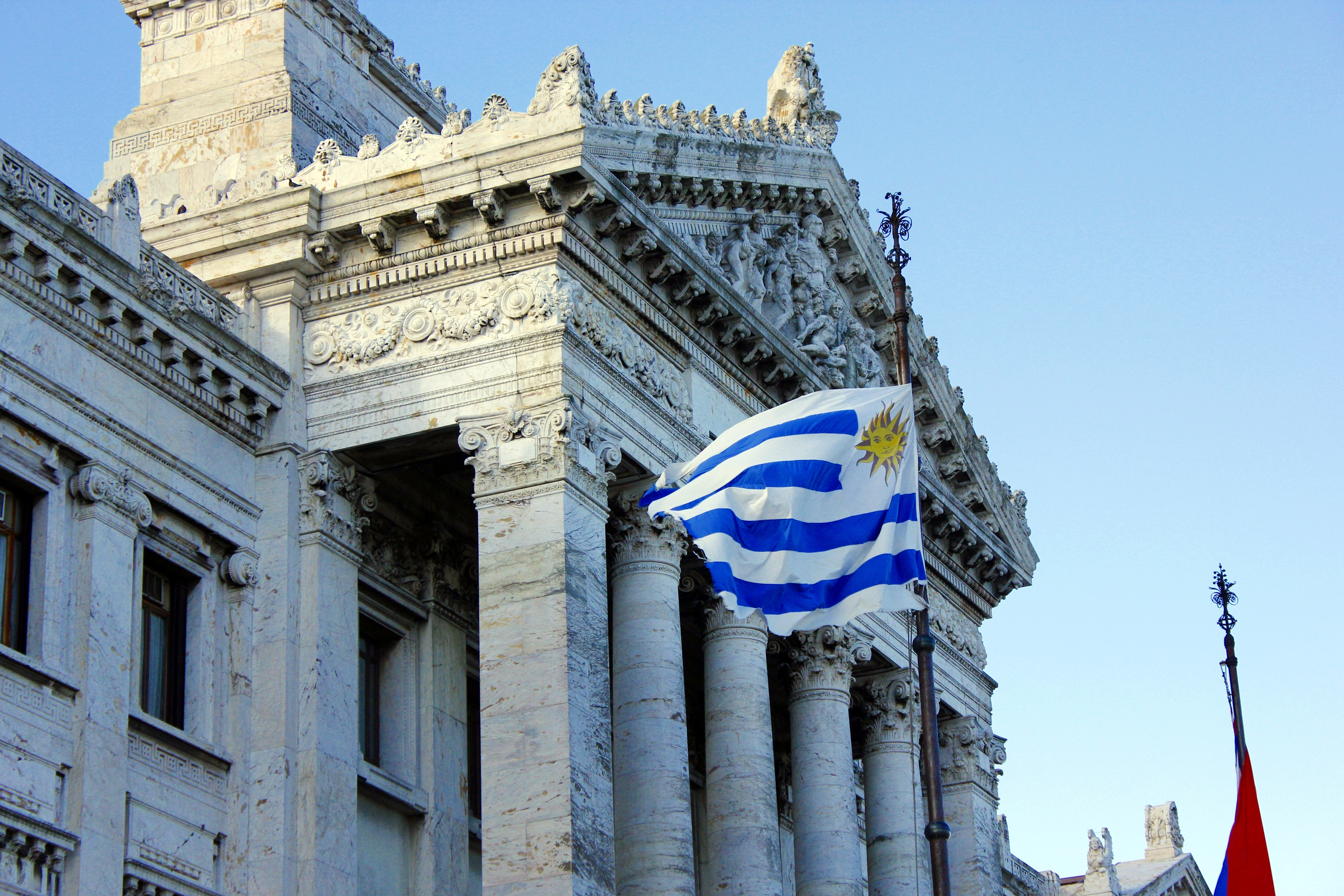
Flag in the Palacio Legislativo

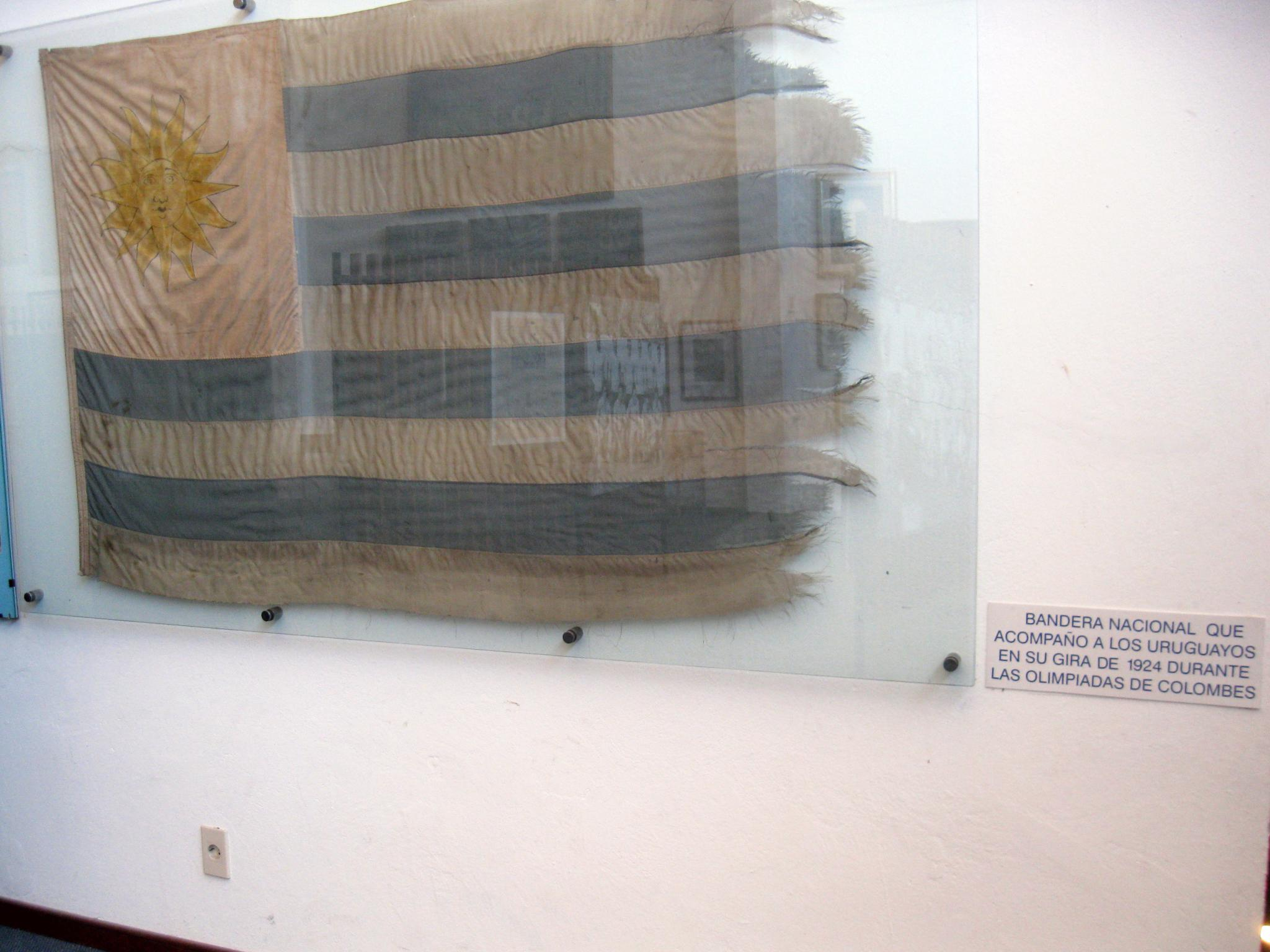
Historical Flag from the 1924 Olympic Games

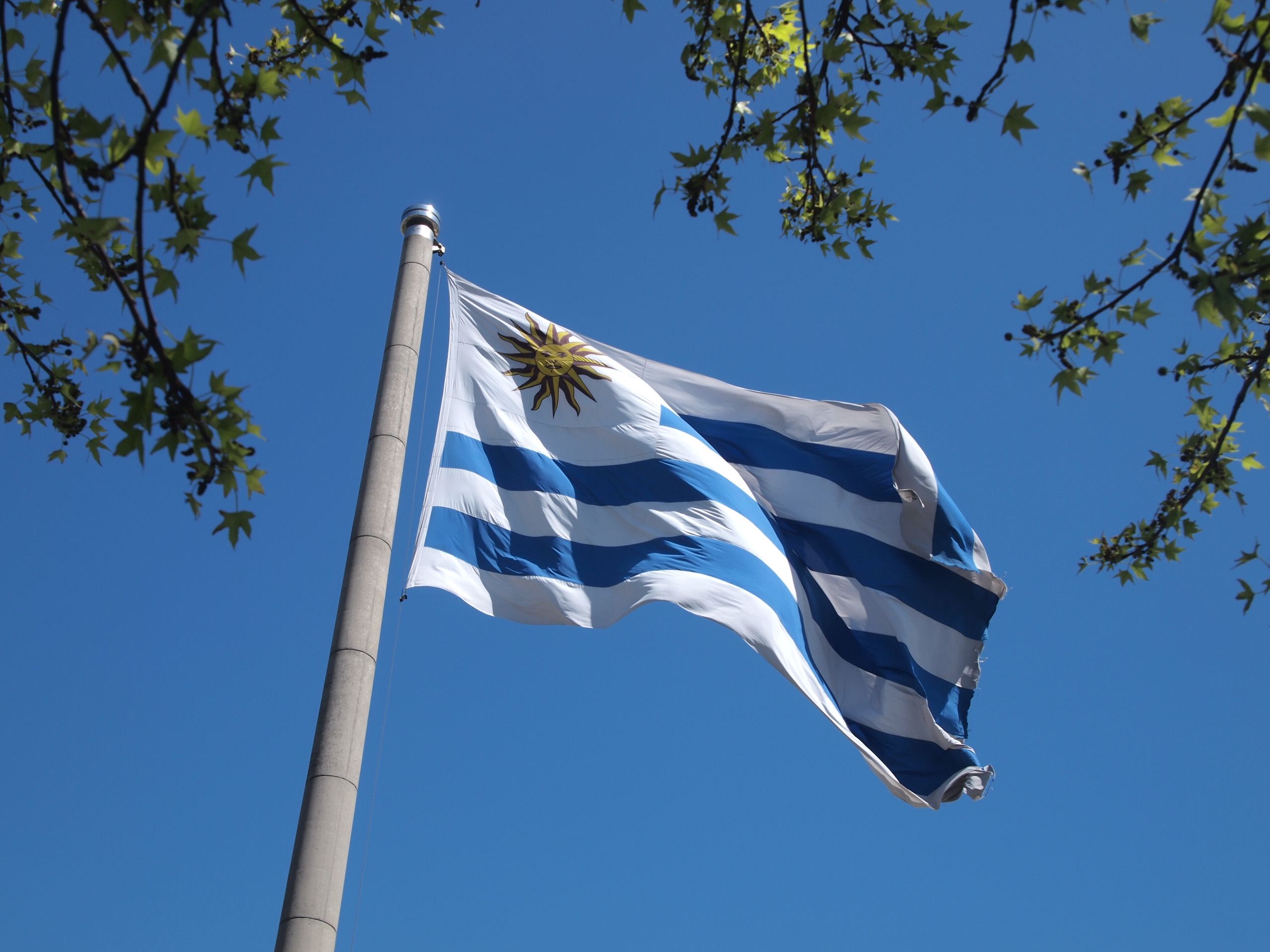

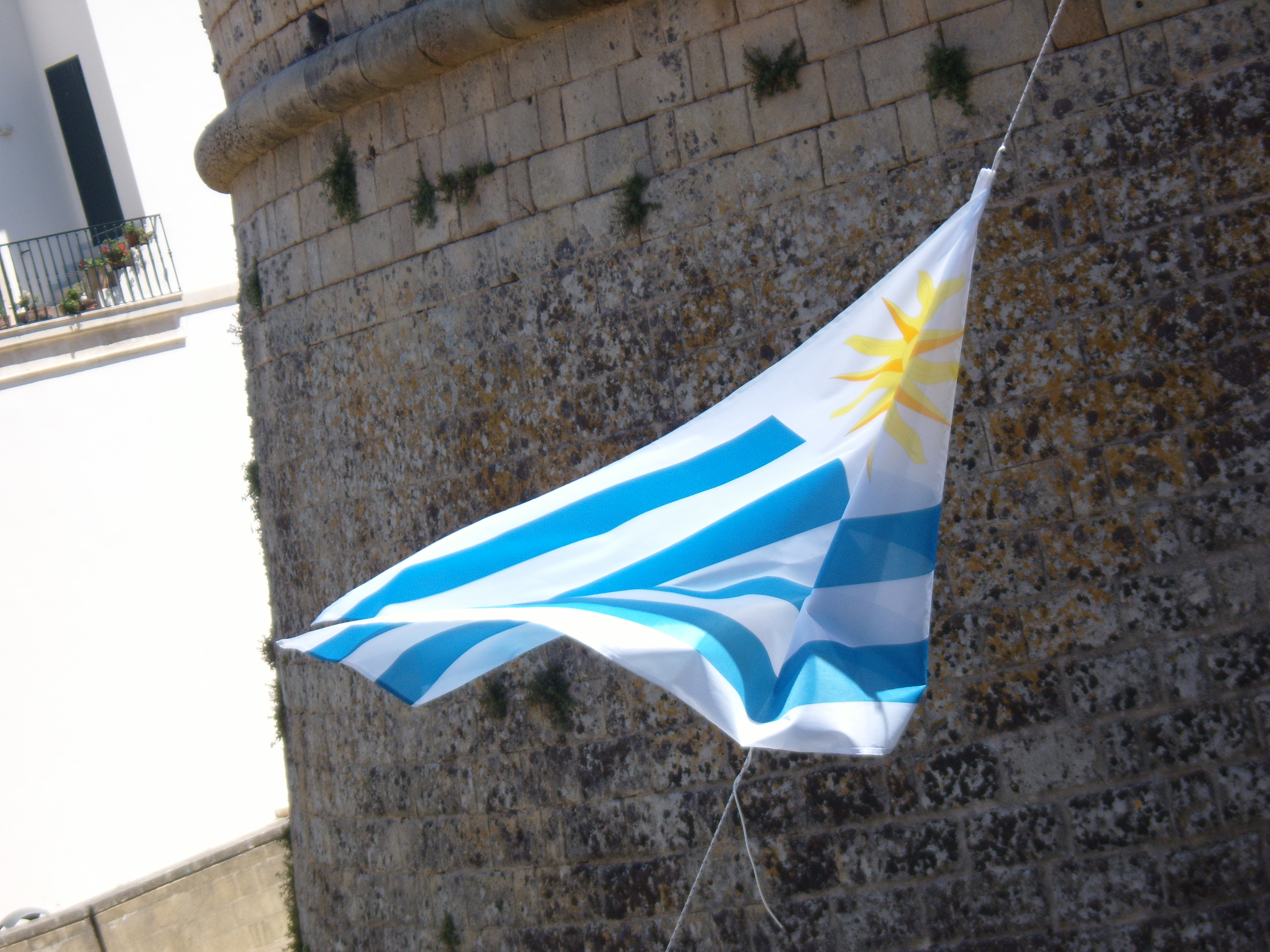
Flag in Otranto

== See also ==
- List of Uruguayan flags
- Coat of arms of Uruguay
