= Flag families =

Groupings of flags

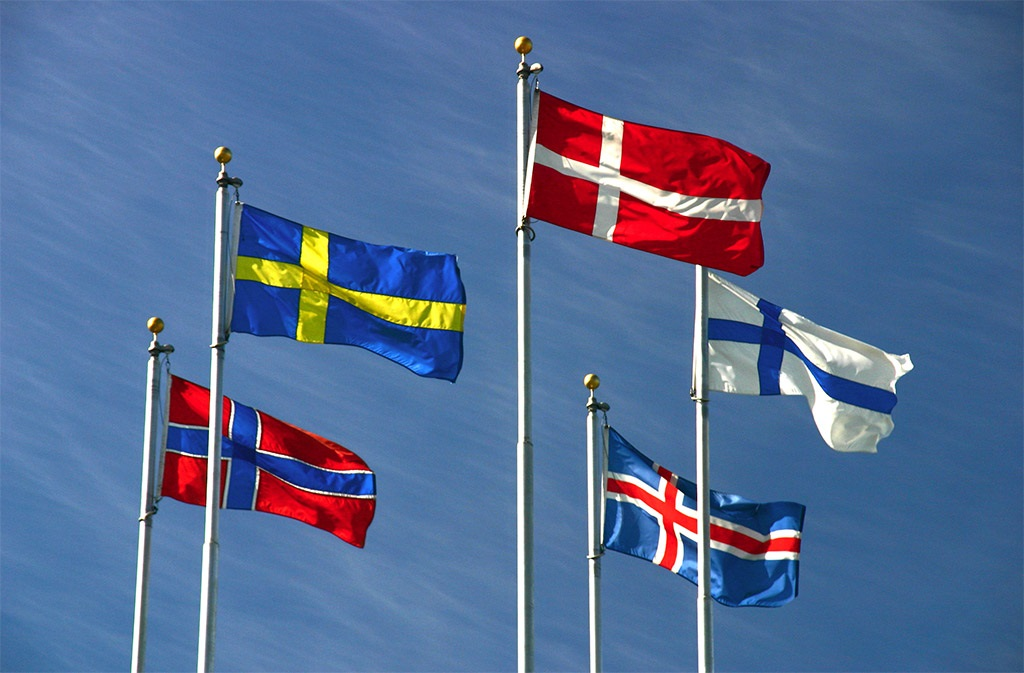
Flags in the Nordic cross family

Flag families are sets of flags with similarities in their design, often based on a shared history, culture, or influence. Families listed here do not include flags with coincidental similarities. Flags may be in multiple flag families. Only twelve current national flags existed before the nineteenth century, when large-scale flag use began. Seven of these flags (Denmark, France, the Netherlands, Russia, Turkey, the United Kingdom, and the United States) are the inspiration for more than 130 current national flags and ensigns.

== Christian cross ==
The first flag of Portugal (c.1100 AD)

The 12th century flag of the Duchy of Gascony

The 12th century flag of the Kingdom of Jerusalem

A Christian cross flag is any flag with a cross or crosses as a central element of its design (as opposed to flags like those of Malta and Serbia, which use crosses as smaller embellishments). It is the oldest flag family. The first flag purported to have such a cross was the flag of Portugal, beginning in around 1100. The flag design became the most common design for merchant ships across Europe for several centuries. Flags in this family use different types of crosses, including the Latin cross (†), the Greek cross (✚), the Jerusalem cross, the saltire (✖), and the Maltese cross (✠) — the Maltese cross does not appear on Malta's national flag, only its civil ensign.

Current national flags in the Christian cross family
Flag of Burundi

Flag of Dominica

Flag of the Dominican Republic

Flag of Georgia

Flag of Greece

Flag of Jamaica

Flag of Malta

Flag of Slovakia

Flag of Switzerland

Flag of Tonga

Flag of the United Kingdom

Current sub-national flags in the Christian cross family
Ikurrina — flag of the Basque Country

Kroaz Du ("Black Cross") — flag of Brittany

Flag of Cornwall (Saint Piran)

Flag of England

Flag of Scotland

Flag of the Province of Ulster

Flag of Jersey

Flag of Guernsey

Flag of Madeira

Flag of Nova Scotia

Flag of Alabama

Flag of Florida

=== Nordic cross ===
Flags in the Nordic cross family feature crosses stretching the width and length of the flag, with the center offset to hoist. The cross design represents Christianity, and was first seen in the Dannebrog, the national flag of Denmark since the 14th century. The other Nordic countries adopted national flags of the same design later on. Though the design is strongly associated with Nordic countries, cities and territories outside the region use this design. Greenland is the only Nordic region that does not use the Nordic cross.

National flags in the Nordic cross family
Flag of Denmark

Flag of Finland

Flag of Iceland

Flag of Norway

Flag of Sweden

Sub-national flags in the Nordic cross family
Flag of Åland
(Finland)

Flag of the Faroe Islands
(Denmark)

Flag of Barra
(the Hebrides, Scotland)

Flag of Caithness
(mainland of Scotland)

Flag of Orkney
(the Northern Isles, Scotland)

Flag of Shetland
(the Northern Isles, Scotland)

Flag of the Isle of Skye
(the Hebrides, Scotland)

Flag of Sutherland
(mainland of Scotland)

Flag of South Uist
(the Hebrides, Scotland)

Flag of the West Riding of Yorkshire
(England)

== Crescent ==
Flags with crescents are recorded as being used in the region of Middle East and North Africa as early as the 14th century. These designs often featured a white crescent open toward the top on a solid-colored field. During the 19th century when national flags became common, the Ottoman Empire was the only Muslim state considered a world power. Its flag popularized the crescent design for other Muslim nations when they later adopted flags. Most Muslim crescent flags also have one or more stars near or within the circle formed by the crescent. The crescent appears on several flags of non-Muslim subnations and municipals. These crescent flags have symbolism unrelated to Islam.

Current national flags in the crescent family
Flag of Algeria

Flag of Azerbaijan

Flag of Brunei

Flag of the Comoros

Flag of Libya

Flag of Malaysia

Flag of Maldives

Flag of Mauritania

Flag of Pakistan

Flag of Singapore

Civil Ensign of Singapore

Flag of Tunisia

Flag of Turkey

Flag of Turkmenistan

Flag of Uzbekistan

Current international flags in the crescent family
Flag of the League of Arab States

Flag of the Organization of Turkic States

Current subnational flags in the crescent family
Flag of Osa Canton, Costa Rica

Flag of Anjouan, Comoros

Flag of Grande Comore, Comoros

Flag of Wajir County, Kenya

Flag of Labuan, Malaysia

Flag of Johor, Malaysia

Flag of Kelantan, Malaysia

Flag of Malacca, Malaysia

Flag of Selangor, Malaysia

Flag of Terengganu, Malaysia

Flag of Bayan-Ölgii Province, Mongolia

Flag of Hunza, Pakistan

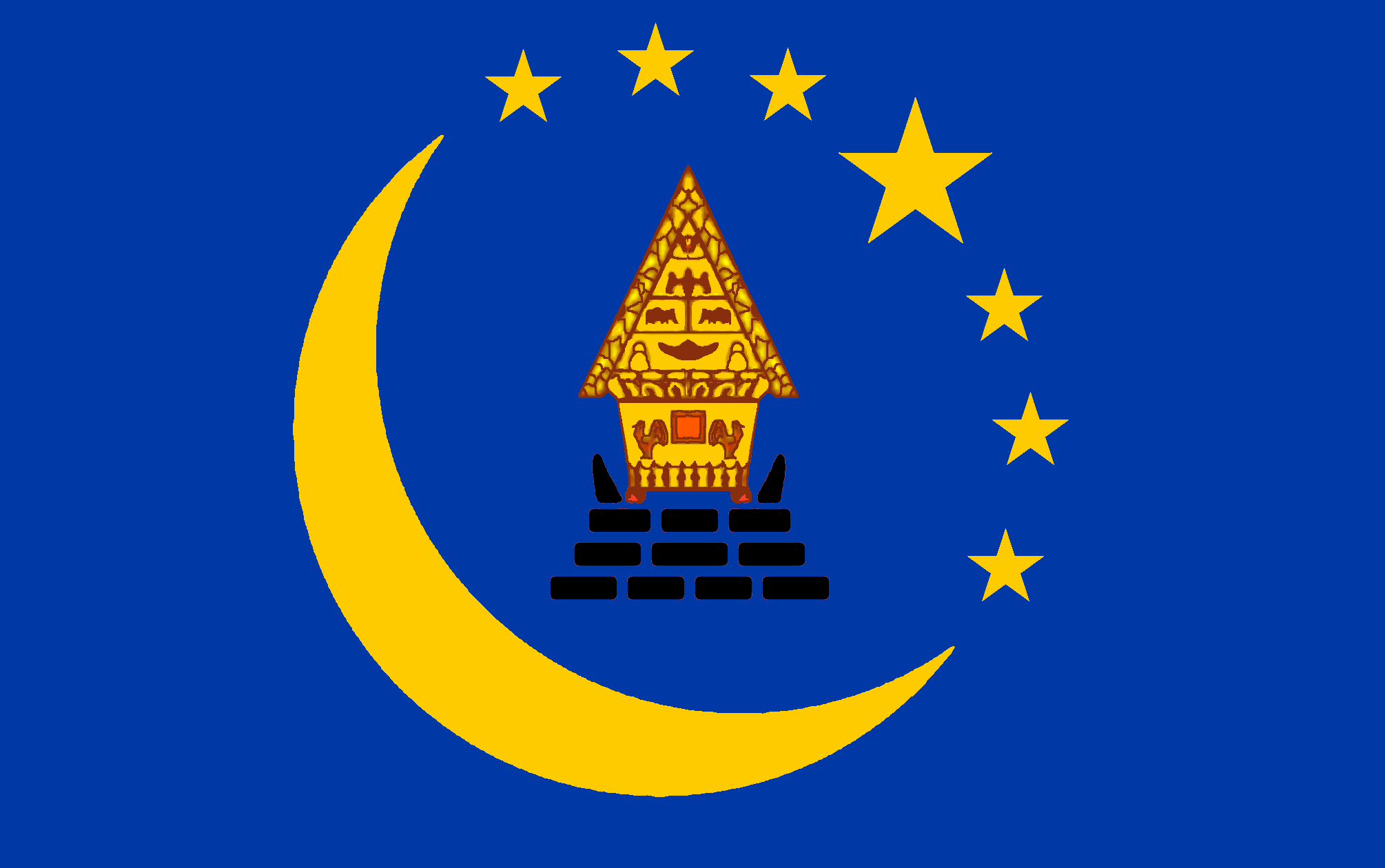
Flag of Koror state, Palau

Flag of Bangsamoro, Philippines

Flag of South Carolina, US

Flag of Azad Kashmir (disputed territory)

Flag of Northern Cyprus (disputed territory)

Flag of Western Sahara (disputed territory)

Current municipal flags in the crescent family
Flag of Sveti Ivan Zelina, Croatia

Flag of Louny, Ústí nad Labem Region, Czech Republic

Flag of Varnsdorf, Czech Republic

Flag of Halle an der Saale, Germany

Flag of Oelde, Schleswig-Holstein, Germany

Flag of Sankt Peter-Ording, Schleswig-Holstein, Germany

Flag of the Metropolitan City of Milan, Italy

Flag of Kuala Lumpur, Malaysia

Flag of Mārahau, New Zealand

Flag of Goleniów, Poland

Flag of Mińsk Mazowiecki, Poland

Flag of Tarnobrzeg, Poland

Flag of Tarnów, Poland

Flag of Portsmouth, England, United Kingdom

== British Ensign ==
The three main ensigns of the United Kingdom, informally also called "dusters", from the top:
1. The civil Red Ensign
2. The naval White Ensign
3. The state Blue Ensign

The British Civil Air Ensign

The Royal Air Force Ensign

The British Ensign family is composed of flags with the Union Jack in the canton. The Union Flag adopted in 1606 combined the Saint George's Cross of England and the St Andrew's saltire of Scotland to form the Union Flag. The St Patrick's saltire was superimposed on the flag in 1801. In the mid-19th century, the British government declared the white ensign for use exclusively by the Royal Navy, a blue ensign for all vessels "belonging to, or permanently in, the service of the Colonies", and a red ensign for non-government vessels. As the British Empire expanded, so too did the use of variations of the ensigns, especially the blue ensign. Of the original fifty-three independent nations in the British Commonwealth, all but four had the Union Jack on their flag. Forty-four have removed the Union Jack from their flags.

Current national flags in the Union Jack family
Flag of Australia

Flag of Fiji

Flag of New Zealand

Flag of Tuvalu

Current sub-national flags in the Union Jack family
Flag of Anguilla

Flag of Ascension Island

Flag of Bermuda

Flag of the British Antarctic Territory

Flag of British Columbia

Flag of the British Indian Ocean Territory

Flag of the British Virgin Islands

Flag of the Cayman Islands

Flag of the Cook Islands

Flag of the Falkland Islands

Flag of Hawaii

Flag of Manitoba

Flag of Montserrat

Flag of New South Wales

Flag of Niue

Flag of Ontario

Flag of the Pitcairn Islands

Flag of Queensland

Flag of Saint Helena

Flag of South Australia

Flag of South Georgia and the South Sandwich Islands

Flag of Tasmania

Flag of Tristan da Cunha

Flag of the Turks and Caicos Islands

Flag of Victoria

Flag of Western Australia

== Stars and Stripes ==
The flag of the British East India Company that inspired subsequent stars and stripes designs.

Flag of the United States (1776–1777), similar to the flag of the British East India Company shown above.

The stars and stripes flag family is composed of flags of alternating stripes with a field in the hoist (often the canton) charged with an emblem (often, but not always, a star or stars).

Early versions of the flag of the United States were based on the flag of the United Kingdom, with the Union Flag on the canton. Instead of a solid-colored field, they had stripes inspired by the flag of the East India Company. In 1777, the Continental Congress of the United States resolved to replace the Union Flag with thirteen stars.

The first nation to adopt a similar flag was the Hawaiian Kingdom, and many other nations wanting to express ideals of liberty and democracy followed suit.

Current national flags in the stars and stripes family
Flag of the United States

Flag of Chile

Flag of Cuba

Flag of Malaysia

Flag of Togo

Flag of Uruguay

Flag of Liberia

Current sub-national flags in the stars and stripes family
Flag of Abkhazia (partially recognized republic)

Flag of Amazonas (Brazilian state)

Flag of Bahia (Brazilian state)

Flag of Brittany (region of France)

Flag of Georgia (U.S. state)

Flag of Goiás (Brazilian state)

Flag of Hawaii (U.S. state)

Flag of Maranhão (Brazilian state)

Flag of Ohio (U.S. state)

Flag of Puerto Rico (U.S. territory)

Flag of Piauí (Brazilian state)

Flag of North Carolina (U.S. state)

Flag of Yucatán (state of Mexico)

Flag of São Paulo (Brazilian state)

Flag of Sergipe (Brazilian state)

Flag of Texas (U.S. state)

Flag of West Papua (proposed country)

== Dutch and pan-Slavic colors ==
Dutch Prince's Flag from 1575 to 1652

Dutch and pan-Slavic colors are a family of flags, usually with red, white, and blue stripes, inspired by the Dutch and later Russian flags. The first flag of simple stripes were the livery colors of William I, Prince of Orange, used in the mid-16th century. These stripes of orange, white, and blue became the first flag of the Netherlands. In the 17th century, the orange was replaced by red. Tsar Peter the Great personally designed a merchant flag of Russia based on the colors of the flag of the Netherlands. The Russian flag, in turn, inspired many flags of countries in the Slavic region. Most retained the white, blue and red, but Bulgaria changed the blue stripe on the flag of Russia into a green stripe symbolising liberty.

Current national flags in the Dutch and pan-Slavic family
Flag of Bulgaria

Flag of Croatia

Flag of the Czech Republic

Flag of Luxembourg

Flag of the Netherlands

Flag of Russia

Flag of Serbia

Flag of Slovakia

Flag of Slovenia

Co-official flag of Transnistria (disputed territory)

== Tricolours and tribands ==
Flag of France from 1790 to 1794

Flag of Austria from 1230 to present

A tricolor is any flag following the flag of France in its design of three vertical stripes of equal width, each distinct in color. On the eve of the French Revolution, 13 July 1789, red and blue cockades were given to the militia of Paris. Soon afterward, Louis XVI added one to his royal white cockade. These colors, arranged as stripes, became the flag of France in 1794. In this way, vertical tribands of three colors became associated with movements for republicanism and were adopted by many nations transitioning to republican governance, although their use was never exclusive to such states. Unlike tricolour, the triband design may contain two identical colors, such as flags of Nigeria and Peru.

Current national flags in the tricolour family
Flag of Armenia

Flag of Azerbaijan

Flag of Belgium

Flag of Bolivia

Flag of Bulgaria

Flag of Chad

Flag of Egypt

Flag of Estonia

Flag of Ethiopia

Flag of France

Flag of Gabon

Flag of Germany

Flag of Guinea

Flag of Hungary

Flag of India

Flag of Iran

Flag of Ireland

Flag of Italy

Flag of Ivory Coast

Flag of Lithuania

Flag of Luxembourg

Flag of Mali

Flag of Mexico

Flag of Moldova

Flag of Myanmar

Flag of the Netherlands

Flag of Niger

Flag of Paraguay

Flag of Romania

Flag of Russia

Flag of Sierra Leone

Flag of Venezuela

Flag of Yemen

Current non-tricolour national flags in the triband family
Flag of Argentina

Flag of Austria

Flag of Barbados

Flag of Mongolia

Flag of Nigeria

Flag of Peru

A number of triband flags have a central band that is exactly twice the width of others, a design known as Spanish fess (horizontal) or Canadian pale (vertical). On some flags, this is not the central band, such as for Colombia or Rwanda.

Current national flags in the triband family with 1:2:1 or 2:1:1 ratio
Flag of Cambodia

Flag of Canada

Flag of Colombia

Flag of Ecuador

Flag of Laos

Flag of Lebanon

Flag of Libya

Flag of Rwanda

Flag of Spain

Current national flags in the triband family with other ratios
Flag of Andorra (8:9:8)

Flag of Belize (1:8:1)

Flag of Latvia (2:1:2)

Flag of Lesotho (3:4:3)

Flag of Tajikistan (2:3:2)

== Pan-African colors ==
Flags in the pan-African family use a combination of some or all of the colors red, yellow, green, and black. Some pan-African flags also have white and, less commonly, blue, but these are not considered pan-African colors. The designs of flags in this family vary considerably. The colors red, yellow, and green became associated with pan-African colors through the Ethiopian flag. Black was later added by Marcus Garvey, an activist and organizer for the first black unification movement in the United States. Inspired by the pan-African colors' growing association with post-colonial independence, many countries in the Caribbean and the Guianas with large populations in the African diaspora also adopted pan-African colors.

Current African national flags in the general pan-African colors family
Flag of Angola

Flag of the Central African Republic

Flag of Chad

Flag of the Comoros

Flag of Eritrea

Flag of Eswatini

Flag of Mauritius

Flag of Mozambique

Flag of the Seychelles

Flag of South Africa

Flag of South Sudan

Flag of Tanzania

Flag of Uganda

Flag of Zambia

Flag of Zimbabwe

Current Caribbean and Guianese flags in the general pan-African colors family
Flag of Dominica

Flag of Grenada

Flag of Guyana

Flag of Jamaica

Flag of Saint Kitts and Nevis

Flag of Suriname

Flag of Trinidad and Tobago

=== Ethiopian flag family ===
Allegedly, the first tricolor flag of Ethiopia was based on three war pennants arranged horizontally

The colors green, yellow, and red have been historically important in Ethiopia since the early 17th century. Along with Liberia, Ethiopia was the only currently existing nation to avoid European colonization during the scramble for Africa. Its flag, therefore, was the inspiration for many countries that gained independence after colonization. The modern flags of Bolivia, Lithuania, and Myanmar also use these three colors, but their origins are unrelated to the Ethiopian flag.

Current national flags in the Ethiopian pan-African colors family
Flag of Benin

Flag of Burkina Faso

Flag of Cameroon

Flag of the Republic of the Congo

Flag of Ethiopia

Flag of Guinea

Flag of Mali

Flag of Mauritania

Flag of Senegal

Flag of Togo

==== Marcus Garvey and Theodosia Okoh families ====
Marcus Garvey's Pan-African flag has influenced the current flags of Kenya (1963), Malawi (1964) and South Sudan (2005)

Theodosia Okoh's flag of Ghana has influenced the designs of the current flags of Guinea-Bissau (1973) and São Tomé and Príncipe (1975)

The Jamaican pan-Africanist leader Marcus Garvey inspired two independent sets of national African flags. In 1917, he proposed a red, black, and green flag for his organization, known as the Universal Negro Improvement Association and African Communities League. According to Garvey:

"Red is the color of the blood which men must shed for their redemption and liberty; black is the color of the noble and distinguished race to which we belong; green is the color of the luxuriant vegetation of our Motherland."

These three decorative colors of Marcus Garvey were the inspiration behind the flag of Kenya, the flag of Malawi, the Flag of South Sudan and other historic flags such as the flag of Biafra. Independently, Marcus Garvey also created the Black Star Line, a shipping company between the United States and West Africa that transported many African-Americans to Africa and vice versa. The eponymous black star of the house flag of the company later became a part of three national flags in West Africa, starting with the flag of Ghana designed by Theodosia Okoh.

Current national flags in the Marcus Garvey's pan-African colors family
Flag of Kenya

Flag of Malawi

Flag of Martinique

Flag of South Sudan

Current national flags in the Theodosia Okoh's pan-African colors family
Flag of Ghana

Flag of Guinea-Bissau

Flag of São Tomé and Príncipe

== Pan-Arab colors ==
The flag of the Arab Revolt or the flag of the Kingdom of Hejaz, was the first to combine the four Arab Revolt colors (1916)

Nasserist tricolor flag of Egypt (1952–1958), was the first to combine the three Arab Liberation colors (1952)

The pan-Arab flag family is a set of flags featuring three or four of the colors red, black, white, and green. The flags have three horizontal stripes, often with an emblem in the center or an overlapping shape in the hoist. According to biographers of Muhammad, he used both flags of white and flags of black. Each color of the pan-Arab flags is associated with a caliphate of Islam. White and black flags were used by the Umayyad and Abbasid dynasties respectively. Although green is often identified as the color of the Fatimid dynasty by vexillological sources, that is not correct: their dynastic color was white. Green is now considered the color of Islam. Red was the color of the Hashemites. These colors were also described by the 14th-century Iraqi poet Safi al-Din al-Hilli: "White are our deeds, black are our battles, green are our ranches, red are our swords."

In 1911, members of a Turkish literary club chose these four colors as the colors of the modern Arabic flag. The colors were combined in the flag of the Arab Revolt in 1916, and many countries adopted these colors as the colors of their national flags upon gaining independence from the Ottoman Empire at the end of World War I.

Current flags based on the flag of the Arab Revolt
Flag of Jordan

Flag of Kuwait

Flag of Libya

Flag of Palestine

Flag of Sudan

Flag of Syria

Flag of the United Arab Emirates

Flag of Western Sahara (disputed territory)
Current national flags based on the Arab Liberation Flag
Flag of Egypt

Flag of Iraq

Flag of Yemen

Flag of Sudan

== Pan-Iranian colors ==
State flag of Iran (1848–1852)

Iran adopted a flag with green, white, and red stripes in the mid-19th century. The flag has undergone changes since, but the three stripes remain. When the newly independent republic of Tajikistan changed its flag from its former Soviet version, it chose to use the same stripes in reverse order as a nod to its close cultural ties with neighbouring Iran. The flag of Kurdistan, a geo-cultural region overlapping with Iran, uses the green-white-red stripes of the pan-Iranian flag charged with a 21-rayed golden sun that symbolizes the festival of Newroz marking the arrival of spring and the new year in Kurdish culture on the vernal equinox of 20 March.

Current national flags in the pan-Iranian colors family
Flag of Iran

Flag of Tajikistan

Flag of Kurdistan (Kurdistan Region)

== Pan-Colombian colors ==
Pre-discoverial coat of arms of the Columbus dynasty has influenced the Francisco de Miranda's tricolor flag of Venezuela (1806)

Francisco de Miranda's tricolor flag of Venezuela (1806) has influenced the current flags of Colombia and Ecuador

Flag of the Gran Colombia (1821–1831)

The Pan-Colombian colors family is made up of flags of countries in the South American former area of Gran Colombia. They have three horizontal stripes of yellow, blue, and red taken from the pre-discoverial coat of arms of the Columbus dynasty. Venezuelan revolutionary leader Francisco de Miranda personally designed the flag of Gran Colombia, a historic state that included modern Colombia, Ecuador, Panama, Venezuela, and parts of Brazil and Guyana. The flag of Gran Colombia had three colours signifying Hispanic America (yellow), the Atlantic Ocean (blue), and "bloody Spain" (red). Miranda attributed the inspiration for these colors to a late-night conversation with the German writer and color theorist Johann Wolfgang von Goethe, who is described as saying

Yellow is the most warm, noble and closest to light ... blue is that mix of excitement and serenity, a distance that evokes shadows ... red is the exaltation of yellow and blue, the synthesis, the vanishing of light into shadow.

The flag of Gran Colombia was first hoisted in 1806. It led to the current designs of Colombia, Ecuador, and Venezuela.

Current national flags in the pan-Colombian colors family
Flag of Colombia

Flag of Ecuador

Flag of Venezuela

== Belgrano ==
Flag of Argentina (1812–1818)

The Belgrano flag family is composed of flags of Central and South America with blue and white stripes. In 1812, the Argentine revolutionary general Manuel Belgrano raised a flag in Rosario, Argentina, of three horizontal stripes of blue-white-blue. It was formally adopted by the Government of Argentina in 1816. Six years later, commander-general of El Salvador Manuel José Arce took the "Argentine colours of Belgrano" as a new national flag of that province, becoming the first additional flag of the family. Building on this, the flag of the Federal Republic of Central America had blue and white stripes, and all of the countries that were once part of that republic retain those stripes in some way in their flags. El Salvador and Nicaragua have also retained the triangular emblem of the former republic; the flag of Costa Rica has an additional red stripe. Argentina's and Uruguay's flags now have the Sol de Mayo.

Current national flags in the Belgrano family
Flag of Argentina

Flag of Costa Rica

Flag of El Salvador

Flag of Honduras

Flag of Guatemala

Flag of Nicaragua

Flag of Uruguay

Flag of Artigas
(co-official flag of Uruguay since 1952)

Current sub-national flags in the Belgrano family
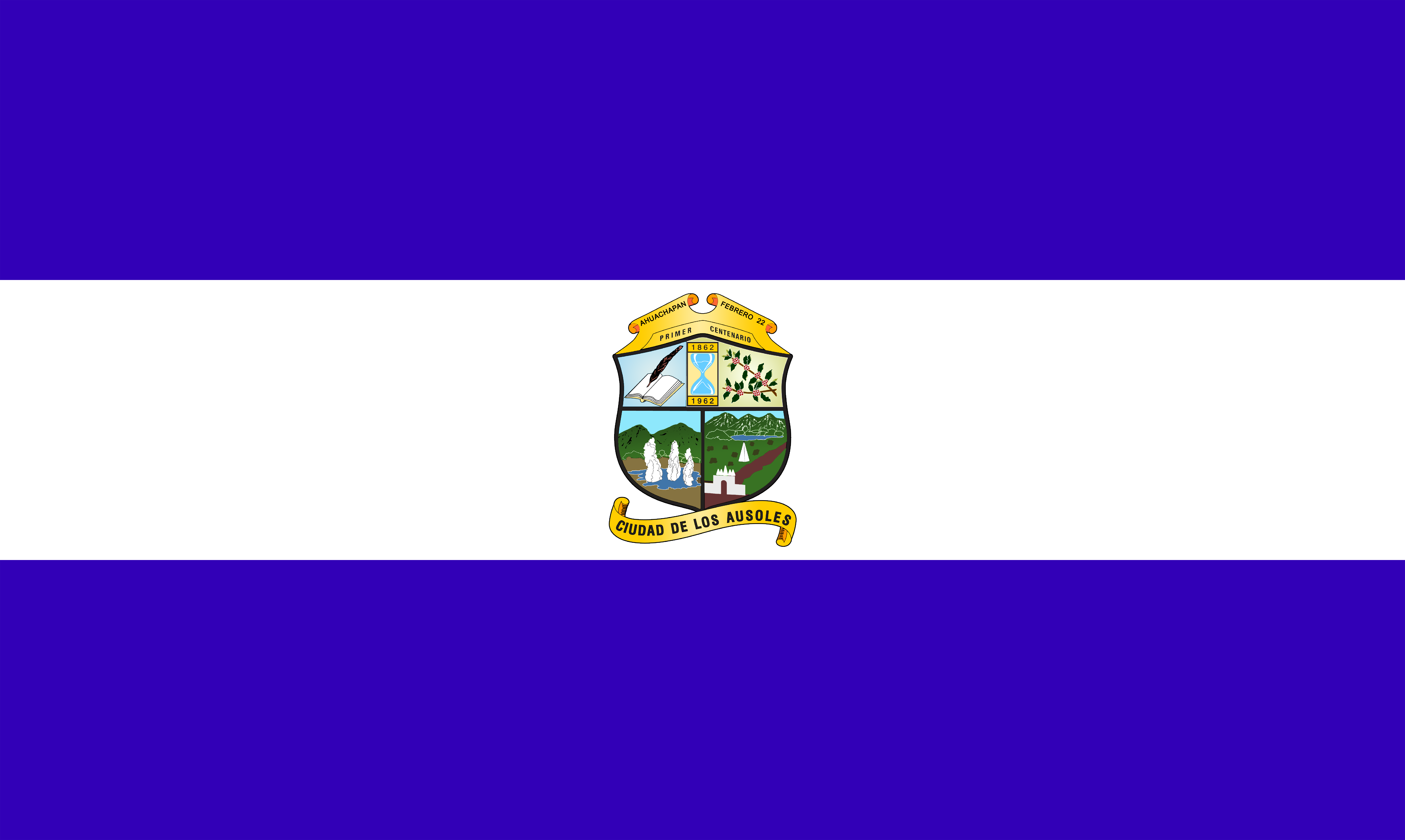
Flag of Ahuachapán
(Salvadoran Department)

Flag of Canelones
(Uruguayan Department)

Flag of Cerro Largo
(Uruguayan Department)

Flag of Corrientes
(Argentine Province)

Flag of Entre Ríos
(Argentine Province)

Flag of Formosa
(Argentine Province)

Flag of Guayaquil
(Ecuadorian City)

Flag of La Pampa
(Argentine Province)

Flag of La Rioja
(Argentine Province)

Flag of Mendoza
(Argentine Province)

Flag of Neuquén
(Argentine Province)

Flag of Paysandú
(Uruguayan Department)

Flag of Rio Negro
(Uruguayan Department)

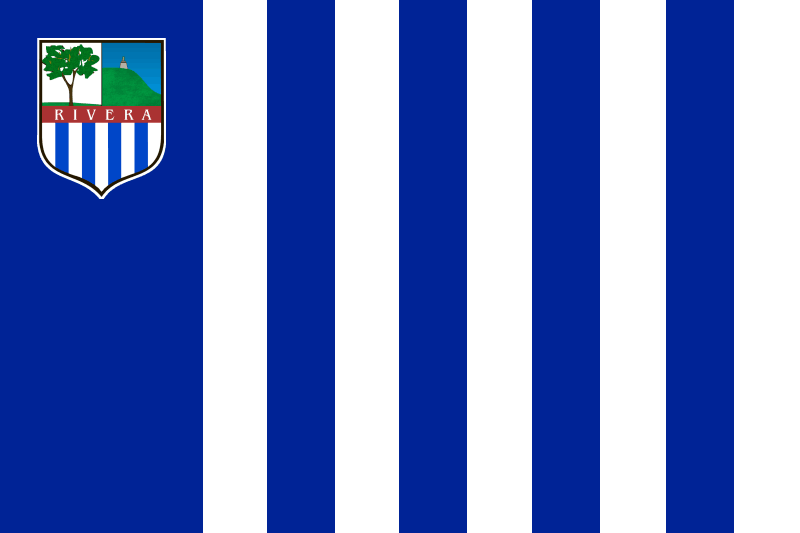
Flag of Rivera
(Uruguayan Department)

Flag of San Andrés and Providencia
(Colombian Department)

Flag of San Juan
(Argentine Province)

Flag of Soriano
(Uruguayan Department)

Flag of Tucumán
(Argentine Province)

Flag of Treinta y Tres
(Uruguayan Department)

== Red banner ==
Flag of the Soviet Union (1955–1991)

The red banner flag family is the family of flags that use large red fields or red stars as symbols of communism. The color red became associated with revolution when it was adopted by the Jacobins during the early days of the French Revolution as a symbol of their willingness to shed blood for their cause. After being used by the Paris Commune in 1871, the color became closely associated with socialism. The Bolsheviks used these flags as inspiration during the Russian Revolution, adopting the flag of the Soviet Union upon their victory in 1922. As a result, the color red became more closely associated with communism than socialism. The flag also featured a hammer and sickle and a red star fimbriated by gold, two symbols that also became closely associated with communism. As communism spread during the 20th century, many countries, especially in Asia and Africa, adopted red flags and stars to symbolize their support for the political movement. Every former Soviet state once flew red banners. All but Belarus, which simply removed the traditional communist hammer and sickle, has adopted a different flag since the fall of the Soviet Union. Similarly, the current flag of Mongolia removed the communist star from its flag in 1992, but kept all of the other elements.

Current national flags in the red banner family
Flag of Angola

Flag of Belarus

Flag of China

Flag of Mongolia

Flag of North Korea

Flag of Transnistria (disputed territory)

Flag of Vietnam

== Trucial States ==
The flag of Dubai, one of the emirates of the United Arab Emirates

Trucial State flags are a flag family from the southern and eastern coasts of the Persian Gulf. They consist of red flags with white stripes, cantons, or borders. Red is a traditional color of the Kharijite Muslims who lived in this region, and they historically used all-red banners. It was the British who added the white to the flags of the region. When the region became a British protectorate in 1820, the treaty drafted by the United Kingdom said

the friendly Arabs shall carry by land and sea a red flag, with or without letters in it, at their option, and this shall be in a border of white...

Instead of borders, most of the states adopted a stripe. Nearly all of these states are now member emirates of the United Arab Emirates. While the flag of the United Arab Emirates is not a Trucial States flag, the flags of the individual member emirates still are. In the 1930s, the independent countries within the Trucial State flag family, Bahrain and Qatar, both adopted serrated edges from their earlier straight-edge designs. The flag of Qatar is unique in the Trucial State flag family for having a darker shade of red or maroon, a color made using traditional shell-based dye from the area.

Current national flags in the Trucial States family
Flag of Bahrain

Flag of Qatar

== United Nations ==
The flag of the United Nations (1947–present)

The United Nations flag family includes the flag of the United Nations and subsequent flags that borrowed design elements from the flag including the colors, symbols, or both. The UN adopted its emblem and flag in 1947. The flag came to represent the neutrality and cooperation of the UN, so similar flags are often adopted for regions in states of conflict or instability. The first such national flag was the flag of Eritrea from 1952 to 1962, which symbolized peace between the Christians and Muslims in the newly formed country. The current Eritrean national flag, adopted in 1993, has less of the UN blue, but still retains the UN olive branches from the first design. The flag of Cyprus, adopted 1960, has no UN blue, but has the laurel wreath and a map as the central emblem. Most national flags inspired by the UN's were flags of United Nations trust territories, colonies that transitioned to independence with support and administration from the UN. These include the flag of the Trust Territory of the Pacific Islands (which later inspired the flags of Micronesia and the Northern Mariana Islands) the flag of the Trust Territory of Somaliland (which is the design of the current flag of Somalia), and the Flag of the United Nations Transitional Authority in Cambodia (which was replaced by the current flag of Cambodia that is not in the UN flag family).

Current national and supra-national flags in the United Nations family
Flag of Bosnia and Herzegovina

Flag of Cape Verde

Flag of Cyprus

Flag of the Democratic Republic of the Congo

Flag of Djibouti

Flag of Eritrea

Flag of Kosovo (disputed territory)

Flag of the Federated States of Micronesia

Flag of Nauru

Flag of Palau

Flag of Rwanda

Flag of Somalia

Flag of South Sudan

Flag of Tuvalu

Flag of Turkmenistan

Flag of the Council of Europe and the European Union

Flag of the Commonwealth of Nations

== Southern Cross ==
The Civil Ensign of New Zealand (first flown in 1869, officially adopted 1901)

The Southern Cross, or Crux, is a constellation visible in the Southern Hemisphere, close to the position of the South Celestial Pole, just as the Pole Star Polaris is currently positioned very close to the North Celestial Pole of the celestial sphere. This constellation is visible mostly in the southern hemisphere and it therefore symbolises the southern location of its users. It is depicted on flags and coats of arms of various countries and sub-national entities. It is most closely associated with nation states and territories of Oceania, primarily, but to a much lesser degree also South America, with it appearing in varying orientations on the flags of a large number of Brazilian municipalities.

Current national and sub-national flags in the Southern Cross constellation family
Flag of Australia

Flag of Brazil

Flag of the Cocos (Keeling) Islands
(unofficial flag of the external territory of Australia — no image: flag design copyright in question)

Flag of Christmas Island
(external territory of Australia)

Flag of New Zealand

Flag of Niue
(self-governing island country as a free associated state with New Zealand)

Flag of Papua New Guinea

Flag of Samoa

Flag of Tokelau
(overseas dependent territory of New Zealand)

== See also ==
- Vexillology
- Glossary of vexillology
- Vexillological symbol
- Civil flag
- Ensign (flag)
- Ethnic flag
- Maritime flag
- National flag
- National coat of arms
- National emblem
- National seal
- National symbol
- State flag
- Galleries and lists:
  - Armorial of dependent territories
  - Armorial of sovereign states
  - Flags of Europe
  - Gallery of sovereign state flags
  - Gallery of flags of dependent territories
  - Lists of flags
  - List of flags by design
  - List of national flags by design
  - List of national flags of sovereign states
  - List of Japanese flags
  - List of United Kingdom flags
  - List of Antarctic flags
  - List of flags by color combination
  - List of sovereign states by date of current flag adoption
  - Gallery pages of flags of country subdivisions
