= Sun (heraldry) =

Symbolic form used in heraldry

The sun as a charge

Sun of May as depicted on the flag of Argentina

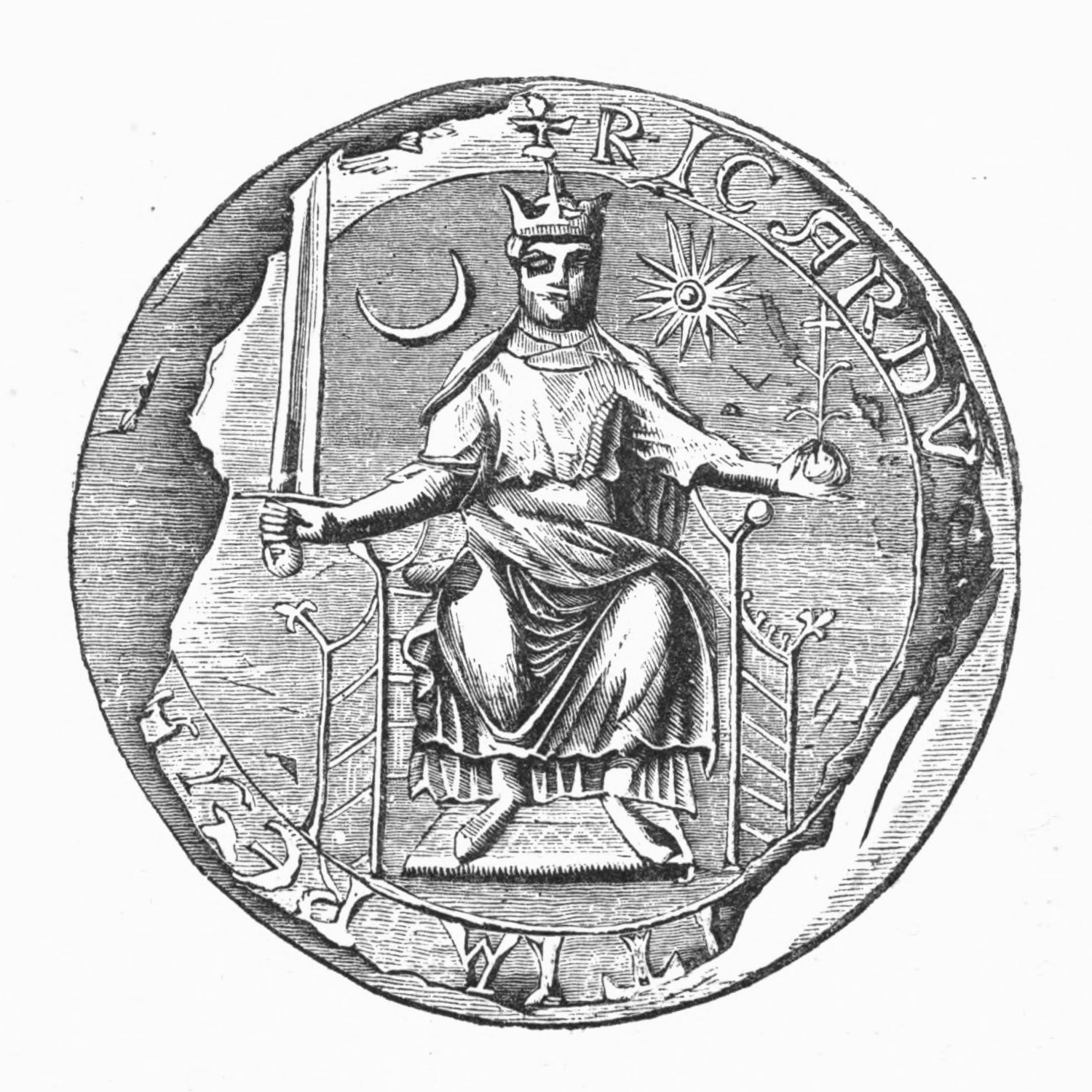
Great Seal of Richard I of England (1198). Richard is depicted as seated between a crescent and a "sun full radiant"

A representation of the sun is used as a heraldic charge. The most usual form, often called sun in splendour or in his glory, consists of a round disc with the features of a human face surrounded by twelve or sixteen rays alternating straight and wavy, which are often said to represent the light and heat of the sun.

It was used as a badge by Edward II of England, and was later adopted by Edward IV following the appearance of a parhelion or "sun dog" before his victory at the Battle of Mortimer's Cross in 1461. It also had significance in alchemy, and may be a symbol of the Roman deity Sol Invictus (Unconquered Sun).

It is a common charge in the heraldry of many countries, regions and cities: e.g. the bearings of Armstrong family in Canada; the Sun in Splendour appears superimposed on the Cross of St. George and behind the White Rose of York on the flag of the West Riding of Yorkshire; and on the arms of Banbury Town Council, England. It also often appears as a rising sun as in the arms of East Devon District Council, England, and as a demi sun as in the coat of Don McLean Aitchison, Canada.

According to historian Diego Abad de Santillán, the Sun of May represents Inti, the Incan god of the sun, and thereby Inca culture. It appears as a heraldic sun in the national flags of Argentina (1818) and Uruguay (1828) and Ecuador (1860), as well as many Subnational Flags, in the flags and shields of the Peru–Bolivian Confederation (1836–1839) and its component the Republic of South Peru, in the flag of Peru of 1822–1825, in the current flag of the Peruvian Navy (1821), and in the Flag of the Hispanic people (1932).

== Examples ==
=== Sun in splendour, with face ===
Arms of Amelot family

Flag of Argentina

Flag of San Juan Province, Argentina

Arms of Arraincourt

Arms of Auzeville-Tolosane

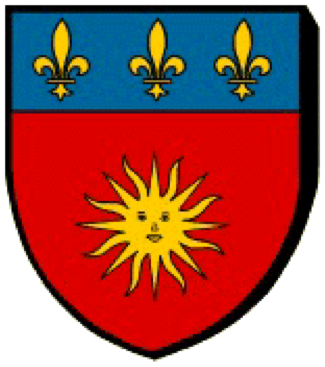
Arms of Basse-Terre

Arms of Bassurels

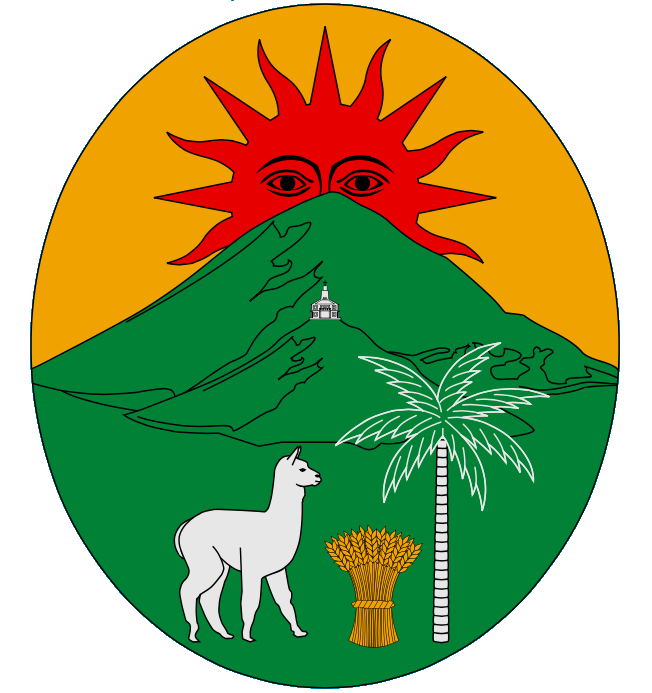
Coat of arms of Bolivia

Flag of Corrientes Province, Argentina

Arms of Creisset

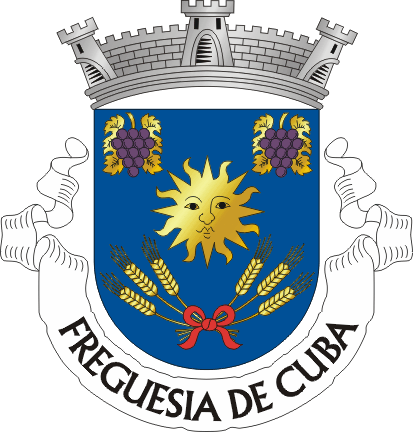
Arms of Cuba (Portugal)

Arms of Dole (Jura)

Arms of Écija

Coat of arms of Ecuador

Arms of Ennetbürgen

Arms of Fontaines-Saint-Martin

Flag of the Hispanic people

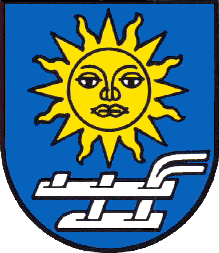
Arms of Känerkinden

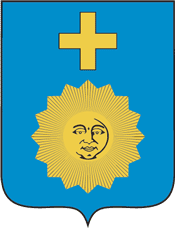
Arms of Kamianets-Podilsky

Arms of Khmelnytskyi Oblast

Flag of La Pampa, Argentina

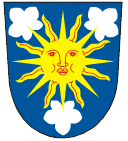
Arms of Loukov

Arms of Mende

Flag of Mendoza Province, Argentina

1820 Flag of Peru

1822 Flag of Peru

Flag of the Philippines (1899–1901)

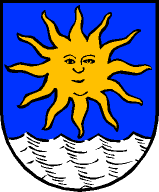
Arms of Sankt Gilgen

Arms of El Soleràs

Arms of Tarnopol Voivodeship

Flag of Uruguay

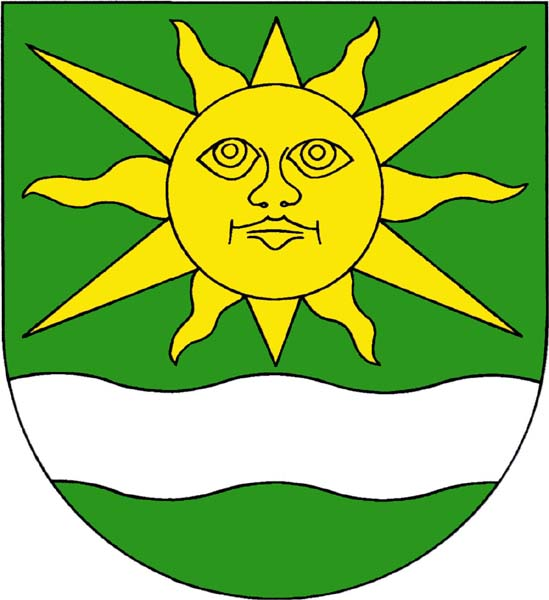
Arms of Vědomice

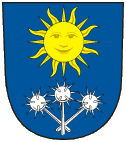
Arms of Věžky

Arms of Vinnytsia Oblast

Arms of Zhytomyr Oblast

Arms of Koper

=== Sun in splendour, without face ===
==== Straight and wavy rays ====
Arms of Archena

Arms of Arosa

Arms of Barbâtre

Arms of La Baule-Escoublac

Flag of the Colorado Party (Uruguay)

Flag of Río Negro, Uruguayan Department

Flag of Treinta y Tres, Uruguayan Department

==== Straight rays (mullet) ====
Arms of Beriáin

Arms of Dobel

Arms of Galar

Flag of Macedonia (Greece) (Vergina Sun)

Flag of the Republic of China (Taiwan)

Flag of Tibet

Flag of Kazakhstan

Flag of Kyrgyzstan

Flag of Paysandú, Uruguayan Department

==== Wavy rays (estoile) ====
Arms of the Diocese of Gothenburg

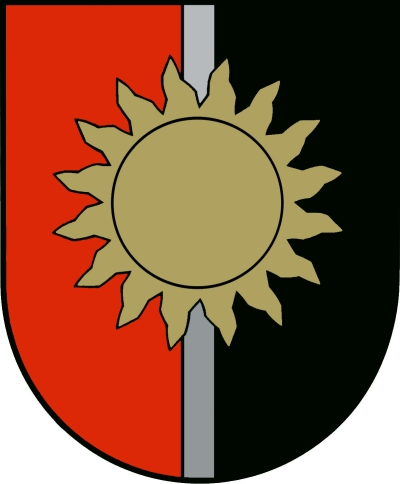
Arms of Jēkabpils district

Flag of Kyrgyzstan (1992–2023)

==== Without rays (roundel) ====
Australian Aboriginal flag

Flag of Japan

Flag of Bangladesh

==== Other forms ====
Naval Ensign of Japan

Coat of arms of Latvia

Flag of North Macedonia

Flag of the Philippines

Naval Jack of the Philippines

Emblem of the Philippines (1899–1901/1902)

Flag of South Peru (1836–1839)

Flag of the Székelys, depicting a napcsillag ('sun–star')

Coat of arms of British Airways

== See also ==
- Solar symbol
- Splendor Solis
- Star (heraldry)
- Sun of May
- Sol Invictus
- Winged sun
