= List of Argentine flags =

Flags of Argentina

This is a list of flags used in or otherwise associated with Argentina.

== National flags ==
Flag	Date	Use	Description
	1861–present	National and state flag	A triband, composed of three equal horizontal bands colored light blue, white, and light blue with a yellow Sun of May in the center.
	1861–present	Optional civil flag	The flag of Argentina without the Sun of May.
	1818–present	Flag of Argentina (vertical)	A vertical triband, composed of three equal vertical bands coloured light blue, white, and light blue with a yellow Sun of May in the center.

== Presidential standard ==
Flag	Date	Use	Description
	?–present	Presidential standard of Argentina	The national flag of Argentina, with the text "Argentine Republic" inscribed in the top stripe, and "Presidency of the Nation" inscribed in the bottom stripe.

== Military ==
=== Army ===
Flag	Date	Rank	Description
Current
	1940s–present	Commanding Officer of Infantry of the General Staff	
	1940s–present	Commanding Officer of an Army	
	1940s–present	Commanding Officer of the Infantry Branch	
	1940s–present	Commanding Officer of the Cavalry Corps	
	1940s–present	Commanding Officer of the Cavalry Corps Branch	
	1940s–present	Commanding Officer of the Mechanized Corps	
	1940s–present	Commanding Officer of the Mechanized Infantry Corps	
	1940s–present	Director General of the Military Institutions of the Argentine Land Force	
	1940s–present	Army Division Commander	
	1940s–present	Cavalry Division Commander	
	1940s–present	Commander of an engineering regiment or a communications regiment	
	1940s–present	Officer in command of the unit	
	1940s–present	Commander of an armored division	
	1940s–present	Commander of an armored group	
	1940s–present	Command of an Argentine battalion	
Former
	1894–?	Lieutenant General	
	1894–?	Major General	
	1894–?	Brigadier general	
	1894–?	Superior Commander	
	1835–1850	Example of a Federalist military flag	
	1813		In May 1813, the Auxiliary Army of Potosí departed from Potosí, and used a flag with three stripes with the text "To arms for the independence of South America in the Army of the United Provinces of the Río de la Plata, under the protection of its General Our Lady of Mercedes", this being the first instance of an Argentine flag with three stripes.

=== Argentine Navy ===
==== Naval ensign ====
Flag	Date	Use	Description
Former
	1852–1861	Naval ensign of the State of Buenos Aires	
	1840s–1852	Naval ensign of Unitarian Party	
	1840s–1852	Naval ensign of Argentine Confederation	
	1818–1820	Naval ensign of United Provinces of the Río de la Plata	Similar to the national flag, but with a wider top stripe.

==== Jack ====
Flag	Date	Use	Description
Current
	?–present	Jack of the Argentine Navy	A white square with the Sun of May on a light blue field.
Former
	1818	Jack of United Provinces of the Río de la Plata	The national flag with eight stars encircling the Sun of May.

==== Rank flags ====
Flag	Date	Rank	Description
Current
Fleet
	1920s–present	President of Argentina	
	1920s–present	Minister of the Navy	
	1930s–present	Supreme Commander of the Navy	
	1930s–present	Admiral of the fleet	
	1930s–present	Admiral	
	1930s–present	Vice admiral	
	1930s–present	Rear admiral	
	1930s–present	Captain commanding a Naval or Naval Air Force	
	1930s–present	Commander of a Fleet, Naval or Naval Air Force	
	1930s–present	Commander of a Task Force, Naval or Naval Air Force	
	1930s–present	Commander of a Fleet Naval Division	
	1930s–present	Squadron Commander of Naval Air Force	
	1930s–present	Senior Officer	
Naval infantry
	1930s–present	Admiral	
	1930s–present	Vice admiral	
	1930s–present	Rear admiral	
	1930s–present	Captain	
	1930s–present	Commander in charge	
	1930s–present	Commander of the armed unit	
	1930s–present	Officer without Command	
Former
	1894–1920s	President of Argentina	
	1894–1920s	Minister of the Navy	
	1894–1920s	Minister in Chief of the General Staff	
	1894–1920s	Ministers of State	
	1894–1930s	Admiral	
	1894–1930s	Vice admiral	
	1894–1930s	Rear admiral	
	1894–1930s	Captain Adjutant-General	
	1894–1930s	Captain in Command	
	19th century	Commander-in-Chief of the Navy	
	19th century	Rear admiral in command of a subordinate naval force	
	19th century	Vice admiral in command of a subordinate naval force	
	19th century	Captain in command of a subordinate naval force	
	19th century	Admiral Chief of Arsenal	
	19th century	Vice admiral Chief of Arsenal	
	19th century	Rear admiral Chief of Arsenal	
	19th century	Captain Chief of Arsenal	

==== Other ====
Flag	Date	Use	Description
Current
	?–present	War pennant	
	?–present	Flag of excellent readiness to battle award	
Former
	1826	Admiral William Brown's private flag given to him by the women after the Battle of Los Pozos.	
	1815–1820	Flag of the privateers in the service of the League of the Free Peoples	

=== Air force ===
Flag	Date	Rank	Description
Current
	1940s–present	Commander of Aeronautical Establishments	
	1940s–present	Commander-in-Chief	
	1940s–present	Quartermaster general	
	1940s–present	Commander of the Strategic Air Force	
	1940s–present	Commander of the Tactical Air Force	
	1940s–present	Air Defense commander	
	1940s–present	Air Transport commander	
	1940s–present	Air Group commander	
	1940s–present	Air Group commander at the base	
	1940s–present	Commander of the Aviation Technical Group at the base	
	1940s–present	Squadron commander	
Former
	1945–1958	Minister of Aeronautics	

=== Military schools ===
Flag	Date	Use	Description
Current
	?–present	Director of the National Military College	
	?–present	Director of the "Sgt. Cabral" N.C.O.'s School	
	?–present	Director of the "General Lemos" School for Professional Corps	
	?–present	Director of the "Luis Beltran" School for Engineer Mechanics	
	?–present	Director of the Advanced War Training School	
	?–present	Director of a Military Academy	
	?–present	Director of the Infantry School	
	?–present	Director of the Advanced Technical School	
	?–present	Director of the Air Force School	
	?–present	Director of the Air Force War Operations School	
	?–present	Director of the Military Aviation School	

=== Veterans ===
Flag	Date	Use	Description
	2013–present	Flag of veterans of the Malvinas War	Vertically fringed cloth loaded in its center by a radiant sun, similar to that of the National Flag behind this two lines of equal size of upper red and lower black, symbolizing the blood spilled in the operation theater and the black line the footprint of the ground forces (Argentine Army). On the upper end three broken lines is a symbol of the winds representing the Argentine Air Force. Lower edge wavy movement of lines is a symbol of the Argentine Navy. Thus leaving the veterans' flag with the three weapons that defended our area of honor and remembering the fallen in the line of duty. The contrasting colors indicate that absolutely not everything is won in victory and nothing is definitely lost in defeat: this vertical cut flag recalls one of the original ones given by General Manuel Belgrano to this land on February 27, 1812, in the Barrancas del Rio Parana, the first flag of Argentina.
	?–2013	Flag of veterans of the Malvinas War	Argentine triband with a black profile of the Malvinas islands in the center instead of the Sun of May.

== Argentine Naval Prefecture ==
Flag	Date	Use	Description
Current
	1930s–present	Argentine Naval Prefecture	
Former
	1924–1930s	Argentine Naval Prefecture	

== National Gendarmerie ==
Flag	Date	Use	Description
Current
	1938–present	Argentine National Gendarmerie	

== Police ==
Flag	Date	Use	Description
Current
	1943–present	Argentine Federal Police	

== Government ==
Flag	Date	Use	Description
Former
	?–?	Ministry of Finance	
	?–?	Ministry of Health	

== Civil ensign ==
Flag	Date	Use	Description
Current
	?–present	Civil ensign	
	?–present	Pilot flag	
Former
	1852–1861	Merchant flag of the State of Buenos Aires	
	19th century	Pilot flag Buenos Aires	

== First-level administrative divisions ==
Flag	Date	Administrative division	Description
	1995–present	Buenos Aires City	Main article: Flag of Buenos Aires
	1997–present	Buenos Aires Province	Main article: Flag of Buenos Aires Province
	2011–present	Catamarca Province	Main article: Flag of Catamarca
	2007–present	Chaco Province	Main article: Flag of Chaco (Argentina)
	2004–present	Chubut Province	Main article: Flag of Chubut
	2014–present	Córdoba Province	Main article: Flag of Córdoba Province, Argentina
	1986–present	Corrientes Province	Main article: Flag of Corrientes Province
	1987–present	Entre Ríos Province	Main article: Flag of Entre Ríos Province
	1991–present	Formosa Province	Main article: Flag of Formosa Province
	1994–present	Jujuy Province	Main article: Flag of the Civil Freedom of Argentina § Flag of Jujuy
	1993–present	La Pampa Province	Main article: Flag of La Pampa
	1986–present	La Rioja Province	Main article: Flag of La Rioja Province, Argentina
	1992–present	Mendoza Province	Main article: Flag of the Andes
	1992–present	Misiones Province	Main article: Flag of Misiones Province
	1989–present	Neuquén Province	Main article: Flag of Neuquén Province
	2009–present	Río Negro Province	Main article: Flag of Río Negro Province
	1997–present	Salta Province	Main article: Flag of Salta
	2018–present	San Juan Province	Main article: Flag of San Juan Province, Argentina
	1988–present	San Luis Province	Main article: Flag of San Luis Province
	2000–present	Santa Cruz Province	Main article: Flag of Santa Cruz Province, Argentina
	1986–present 1822–1880	Santa Fe Province	Main article: Flag of Santa Fe Province
	1985–present	Santiago del Estero Province	Main article: Flag of Santiago del Estero Province
	1999–present	Tierra del Fuego Province	Main article: Flag of the Tierra del Fuego Province, Argentina
	2010–present	Tucumán Province	Main article: Flag of Tucumán

== Historical flags ==
=== National flags ===
Flag	Date	Use	Description
National flags
	1850–1861	Flag of the Argentine Confederation	Three equal horizontal bands, the upper and lower bands are dark blue, and the middle band is white. A red Sun of May is depicted on the white band. Four red Phrygian caps are placed in the corners.
	1835–1852	Flag of the Argentine Confederation	Three equal horizontal bands, the upper and lower bands are dark blue, and the middle band is white. A red Sun of May is depicted on the white band. Four red Phrygian caps mounted on pikes are placed in the corners.
	1831–1835	Flag of the Argentine Confederation	
	1815–1820	Flag of League of the Free Peoples	
	1815	Flag of League of the Free Peoples	
	1818	Flag of the United Provinces of the Río de la Plata	
	1816–1818	Flag of the United Provinces of the Río de la Plata	
	1810–1816	Flag of the United Provinces of the Río de la Plata	
Local national flags
	1860–1862	Flag of the Kingdom of Araucania and Patagonia	
	1852–1861	Flag of the State of Buenos Aires	

=== Other historical flags ===
Flag	Date	Use	Description
	1836	Flag of the Argentine Confederation used by several nationalists with the text "Viva la Confederación Argentina!", "Mueran los Salvajes Unitarios!" (Long live the Argentine Confederation! Death to the savage Unitarians!)	Main article: Argentine nationalism
	(Unclear, either 1876 or 1882)	Unofficial flag of the Republic of La Boca, a recurrent micronation consisting of the neighborhood of La Boca in Buenos Aires.	The blue, white, and blue triband of Argentina, with the coat of arms of Savoy crowned with a Phrygian cap in the center.
	1890s	Flag of the Selk'nam Genocide survivors	Main article: Selk'nam flag
	1817–1820	Flag of the Army of the Andes	
	1813	Flag of the Civil Freedom of Argentina	
	1820s	Revolutionary flags used by Facundo Quiroga	
	1812–?	Flags used by Army of the North	

==== British Invasion-era flags preserved by Argentina ====
Flag	Date	Use	Description
	1806	1st Battalion, 71st Regiment of Foot	Flags captured from the British military during the British invasions of the River Plate
	1806	2nd Battalion, 71st Regiment of Foot	Flags captured from the British military during the British invasions of the River Plate
	1806	Royal Marines Battalion	Flags captured from the British military during the British invasions of the River Plate
	1806	Flag of the United Kingdom	Flags captured from the British military during the British invasions of the River Plate
	1806	71st Regiment of Foot Guidon	Flags captured from the British military during the British invasions of the River Plate
	1807	Saint Helena Regiment or Rifle Corps of the 95th Infantry Regiment	Flags captured from the British military during the British invasions of the River Plate
	1807	British Red Ensign	Flags captured from the British military during the British invasions of the River Plate

=== Proposed flags ===
Flag	Date	Use	Description
	1931	Proposed civil flag	
		Flag proposal for Argentine Patagonia	

== Ethnic groups flags ==
Flag	Date	Ethnic group	Description
	2016–present	Comechingón	
	2000s–present	Guaraní	Flag of the Guarani in Argentina.
		Lule	
	1991–present	Mapuche	Flag of the Mapuches in Argentina. Once represented also Tehuelche people.
	2009–present	Mocoví	Main article: Mocoví flag
		Pilagá	
	1990s–present	Selkʼnam	Main article: Selk'nam flag
	2012–present	Tehuelche	Main article: Tehuelche flag
		Toba	
		Tonocoté	
		Wichí	
	19th century –	Y Wladfa	Reconstruction of the flag used in the 19th century, at least in 1865. Has gained popularity in recent years.
		Y Wladfa	Flag of Puerto Madryn. Argentina flag with Welsh Dragon.

== Political flags ==
Flag	Date	Party	Description
Current
	1997–present	Communist Party – Extraordinary Congress	
	1946–present	Justicialist Party	
	1896–present	Socialist Party	
	1893–present	Radical Civic Union	
Former
	1990–2009	New Triumph Party	
	1965–1980	Workers' Revolutionary Party	
	1957–1966	Tacuara Nationalist Movement	
	1931–1958	National Democratic Party	
	1919–1939	Argentine Patriotic League, National Fascist Union, and Nationalist Liberation Alliance	
	1890–1891	Civic Union	
Other
	1977–present	Mothers of the Plaza de Mayo	
	1912–present	Argentine Agrarian Federation	

=== Rebel groups flags ===
Flag	Date	Organization	Description
Former
	1973–1974	People's Revolutionary Army of 22 August	
	1973–1974	Popular Liberation Commands^{es}	
	1973–1975	Workers Power Communist Organization^{es}	
	1970–1981	Montoneros	
	1970–1976	People's Revolutionary Army	Two horizontal stripes (light blue and white) symbolizing the "first independence", with an additional red star symbolizing the "second and final independence.
	1970–1975	People's Revolutionary Army - Monte Ramón Rosa Jiménez Company	Two horizontal stripes (light blue and white) symbolizing the "first independence", with an additional red star symbolizing the "second and final independence.
	1968–1972	Guerrilla of the Liberation Army^{es}	
	1963–1964	People's Guerrilla Army^{es}	
	1955–1973	Uturuncos^{es}	

== Argentine Red Cross ==
Flag	Date	Use	Description
Current
	?–present	Argentine Red Cross	
Former
	?–?	Argentine Red Cross	

== Scouts de Argentina ==
Flag	Date	Use	Description
	?–present	Scouts de Argentina	

== Sporting flags ==
Flag	Date	Use	Description
Current
	?–present	Argentine Olympic Committee	
Former
	1912–?	Argentine Football Association	

== Vexillology Association flags ==
Flag	Date	Use	Description
	?–present	Argentina Vexillology Association	
	?–present	Foundation Interdisciplinary Center for Cultural Studies	

== Argentine shipping company ==
Flag	Date	Company	Description
Former
	1960–1996	Empresa Líneas Marítimas Argentinas	
	1949–1960	Argentine Overseas Shipping Fleet^{es}	
	1951–1992	Fiscal Oilfields^{es}	
	1943–1950	State Merchant Fleet^{es}	
	1943–1950	Río de La Plata S.A.^{es}	
	1908–?	Patagonian Importer and Exporter Corporation	
	?–1951	Argentine Navigation Company Dodero	

== Burgees of Argentina ==
Yacht Club Argentino

Club Delta Argentino

Club Náutico Buchardo

Club Marinas Puerto Santa Fe

Club de Náutica y Pesca "Comandante Espora"

Club Regatas Chascomus

Club Regatas La Plata

Club Regatas San Nicolas

Club San Fernando

Club Universitario de Buenos Aires

Club Náutico Albatros

Club Náutico Bahia Blanca

Club Náutico Cordoba

Club Náutico Mar Plata

Club Náutico Olivos

Club Náutico San Isidro

Club Mendoza de Regatas

Club Náutico San Martin

Club Náutico San Pedro

Club Náutico Sudeste

Club Náutico Victoria

Club Náutico Zarate

Club de Veleros Barlovento

Club de Veleros Rosario

Club de Veleros San Isidro

Yacht Club Rosario

Yacht Club Olivos

Yacht Club Santa Fe

Club Náutico Quilmes

Club Náutico San Fernando

Club Suizo de Buenos Aires

Yacht Club Buenos Aires

Rowing Club Argentino

Yacht Club Neuquén

Yacht Club San Isidro

Yacht Club Entrerriano

Yacht Club Centro Naval

== See also ==
- Coat of arms of Argentina
- Provinces of Argentina
