= Flag of Corrientes =

Corrientes

The flag of Corrientes has been the official symbol of the city since 2014. The flag is divided into three equal vertical fields, the two outermost ones are light blue with a red vertical stripe, the middle field is white. In the middle of the flag are two symbols taken from the city's coat of arms. Seven spears represent the seven peninsulas that the coast forms in the Paraná River at the site of the foundation of the city of Corrientes and which gave rise to the name. Above the spears there is a yellow circle, reminiscent of the Sun of May on the national flag. In the middle of the circle there is a cross with two beams. The cross represents the Miraculous Cross, a relic currently kept in the Iglesia de la Santísima Cruz de los Milagros. Shortly after the founding of the Corrientes, the Spanish erected a wooden cross, which the indigenous inhabitants tried to burn, but it survived. The red stripes in the middle of the blue ones refer to the old flag used in Corrientes by José de Silva and to the flag of League of the Free Peoples.

As part of the celebrations of the 426th anniversary of the founding of Corrientes, which took place on 3 April 2014, the then mayor of the city, Fabián Ríos, organized an open competition for citizens. 47 projects were submitted, and the final decision was announced on 4 April during the cultural festival. The project created by Manuel Enrique Echeverría Ponce was chosen. The winning design for the Corrientes flag competition initially did not include the “Miraculous Cross,” a symbol associated with the city's founding, to avoid favoring one religion over another and recognizing its colonial connotations. This decision sparked controversy for rejecting Corrientes’ heritage, while others saw the omission as a necessary step toward inclusivity. Some in the political opposition have also criticized the flag for not representing all citizens.

The flag's designer, Echeverría Ponce, revealed that he had proposed two versions, one of which included a cross. Ultimately, the City Council approved the flag with the cross symbol added to the sun. The flag was officially unveiled on June 29, 2014, during the dedication of the Andrés Guacurarí monument, and five months later, it was adopted as the official flag of Corrientes for use in schools and at city events.

== See also ==
- List of Argentine flags
- Flag of Corrientes Province
- Flag of Resistencia, Chaco
