= Flag of Santa Fe Province =

Santa Fe Province

The Santa Fe flag is a symbol of the Argentine province of Santa Fe, features a vertical tricolour of red, white and blue. In the center is the oval coat of arms of the province. The roots of this design date back to the League of the Free Peoples and the Argentine Civil War. Although the flag was abandoned during the era of centralization in the 1880s, it was reinstated in 1986.

== Symbolism ==
The colors are derived from the colors of the Federalist Party of the first half of the 19th century. White and blue are the colours of the Argentine national flag. Red was chosen by José Artigas to represent federalism. In the middle there is a yellow oval with an inscription Provincia Invencible de Santa Fe (Invincible Province of Santa Fe). Inside the oval are two crossed arrows and a spear with half a sun above them. The sun alludes to the Sun of May, although it has no face. A spear with its head pointing upwards and crossed with two arrows with their heads pointing downwards symbolizes the triumph of culture over the aboriginal tribes.

== History ==
Flag of League of the Free Peoples (1815–1820)

Flag of Santa Fe when it belonged to the League (1815-1821)

Early flag of Santa Fe (pre 1822)

Unused flag chosen in 1821

The basis for the Santa Fe flag was the flag of the League of the Free Peoples designed by José Gervasio Artigas based on Manuel Belgrano's design. In the early times of the province, different flag designs were used in red, white and blue until 1822, when Governor Estanislao López brought order to this issue. López decided to abandon the Artigas's flag because he came into conflict with his former ally Francisco Ramírez, who also used that flag. On 10 April 1821, the Governor proposed several designs to the Honorable Council of Representatives, of which the three horizontal stripes of the national flag with red triangles on the sides were approved, but it was never used. The next and last flag was designed by López after the return of peace in the summer of 1822. Invincible flag was used by the provincial troops in the Battle of Márquez Bridge. This flag of the province of Santa Fe was used and displayed until the 1880s. At that time, the governments of the Generation of '80 limited the autonomy of the provinces and centralized the country. The flag was not legally abolished, however, but its practical use was only discontinued for over 100 years. In the mid-1980s, the provincial government, led by José María Vernet, first semi-officially revived the use of the flag, and then adopted Law No. 9889, which formally reinstated and standardized the flag. The adoption of the law coincided with the celebration of the bicentenary of the birth of Estanislao López in 1986. At the time of readaptation, only two other Argentine provinces used flags, Santiago del Estero which had adopted the flag a year earlier and La Rioja which had adopted its flag at the same time as Santa Fe.

== See also ==
- List of Argentine flags
