= Flag of the Tierra del Fuego Province, Argentina =

Provincial flag of Argentina

Tierra del Fuego Province
- Fuegian Flaming flag
- Use: Civil and state flag, civil ensign
- Proportion: 2:3
- Adopted: November 9, 1999; 27 years ago
- Designed by: Teresa Beatríz Martínez

The flag representing the Argentine province of Tierra del Fuego, Antarctica and South Atlantic Islands was adopted by the provincial government on 9 November 1999. The winning design was created by Teresa Beatríz Martínez. The flag is sometimes used to represent Argentine claims in the South Atlantic, because this province, according to Argentine law, includes the Falklands and South Georgia (two British Overseas Territories), and the sector of Antarctica between the 25° West and 74° West meridians.

== Symbolism ==
The flag is composed of two roughly triangular fields of orange and blue which are divided by stylized white albatross that stretches from the top hoist to the bottom fly. The blue field features five white, five-pointed stars tilted to the left, representing the Southern Cross constellation.

The orange color refers to the name "Tierra del Fuego", which means "Land of Fire". The shape of the orange field is a stylized representation of the outline of the Argentine part of the Isla Grande de Tierra del Fuego. The blue represents the sea that surrounds the island, and the sky. The stars represent the surrounding islands and territorial elements that make up the province. The albatross is a bird native to the local fauna, and in the flag, it represents freedom.

== See also ==
- List of Argentine flags
- Flag of Santa Cruz Province, Argentina
- List of Antarctic flags
- Flag of Antarctica
