= Tehuelche flag =

Ethnic flag

Tehuelche flag (Santa Cruz)

The Tehuelche people are an Indigenous ethnic group from eastern Patagonia in South America. They are represented by two different flags: one used by the inhabitants of the Chubut Province, and the other by the inhabitants of the Santa Cruz province in Argentina. The Indigenous inhabitants of Chubut, who include both Mapuche and largely Araucanized Tehuelche, are formally represented by a tricolor flag created in 1987. The Tehuelche communities of Santa Cruz adopted their own symbol in 2012. This flag was first presented during an exhibition on Tehuelche history at the Río Gallegos Cultural Complex on 19 May, and on 11 June it received official status through a provincial decree no. 1108.

The flag features an arrowhead, symbolizing cultural continuity. Black represents the dried blood of the ancestors, white represents honesty and strength, and brown and blue represent the land and sea of the traditional territory. On the arrowhead is a small image of the Southern Cross, the constellation representing the Southern Hemisphere.

== See also ==
- List of Argentine flags
- Flag of Santa Cruz Province, Argentina
- Flag of the Mapuches
