= Flag of Catamarca =

Catamarca Province

The flag of the Argentine province of Catamarca is rectangular, featuring a golden border that symbolizes the province's cultural heritage. The light blue and white stripes represent the sky and the national flag, while the red stripe symbolizes the origins of the population. At the center, where the colors meet, is the Sun of May, encircled by a wreath of 16 olive leaves, representing the province's departments.

The province of Catamarca was the last province in Argentina to adopt its own provincial flag. The head of the Ministry of Education, Lic. Mario Perna, held a competition throughout the province in 2011, which was composed of Magister Marcelo Ghersani and Alicia Moreno, both specialists in heraldry and vexillology, chaired by Perna, and the winner of the competition was Claudio Fabián Martineta, chosen from a dozen or so models presented. The winning project was first presented by the authorities on August 25, 2011, during a public event on Catamarca Autonomy Day.

== See also ==
- List of Argentine flags
