= Flag of San Luis Province =

Argentine regional flag

San Luis

The flag of San Luis is the official flag used by the Argentine province of San Luis. The flag is white with a ratio of two to three between width and length, while in the center is the coat of arms of the province. Provincial Act No. 4810, which established the flag, was adopted on 22 June 1988. Since 2011, fourth-grade students have been taking the flag oath on August. The provincial coat of arms has been in force since 27 December 1836, but has since undergone some changes, and the official version was created in 1939.

The laurel wreath surrounding the oval coat of arms symbolizes victory and independence. The shield has four mountains, which symbolize the mountainous landscape of the province, shaped by the Sierras Pampeanas and its mineral wealth, as well as spiritual strength.

The deer looking at each other placed under the mountains are a symbol of the identity and the inhabitants of San Luis, and their combatant attitude refers to the original name of the territory as deer places (es:Punta de los Venados).

The sun rising over the mountains is the Sun of May, also present on the national flag.

Flag representing the Social Inclusion Plan, frequently used by Governor Alberto Rodríguez Saá alongside the provincial flag. (2003–2011)

== See also ==
- List of Argentine flags
