= Flag of Resistencia, Chaco =

Resistencia

The flag of Resistencia is one of the official symbols of Resistencia, Argentina, the capital of the Argentine province of Chaco. The colours of the flag are the same as the provincial flag. Green refers to the natural character of the territory. Blue, white and golden yellow refer to the national flag, and blue also symbolizes the waters through which the first immigrants from Friulia arrived. The white square in the middle of the flag refers to the topography of the city, whose streets are oriented at an angle of 45° to the north. In the center of the flag is a symbol now called the Resistencia sun. The sun has two meanings, it refers to the Sun of May from the national flag and represents the central square of the city with the streets branching off from it.

The history of the flag begins with the Resistencia City Council organized the contest Una bandera para Resistencia. The jury of the contest would be composed of city officials and cultural leaders of the city. 38 applicants responded to the invitation, and the project proposed by Sacha Mijaila Vanioff under the pseudonym Jorge Quinto was the winner. The winning design was officially presented on 17 July 2019, but was first raised on 27 January 2020, on the 142nd anniversary of the city.

== See also ==
- Flag of Chaco (Argentina)
- Flag of city of Corrientes
