= Flag of Corrientes Province =

Corrientes Province

The flag of the Argentine province of Corrientes was adopted in 1986. The flag features a horizontal triband of light blue-white-light blue, with a small blue triangle, motto and coat of arms on a white stripe.

== Symbolism ==
The flag of Corrientes, like the national flag of Argentina, consists of three horizontal stripes, the upper and lower stripes are light blue, and the middle stripe is white. On the white stripe, with a base on the hoist, it has a light blue triangle. In the middle of the white stripe is the province's motto used since 1840: "PATRIA - LIBERTAD – CONSTITUCIÓN" (English: HOMELAND – FREEDOM – CONSTITUTION) written in black letters. Between the words "freedom" and "constitution", the provincial coat of arms is placed so that it is halfway between the tip of the triangle and the end of the flag. The shield of the coat of arms is oval, the upper half is blue and the lower half is white. In the middle of the white part there is a drawn handshake holding a pike, the top of which, covered with a red phrygian cap, reaches to the center of the blue field. In the lowest part of the lower field there is a brown Latin cross surrounded by flames. The cross represents the Miraculous Cross, a relic currently kept in the Iglesia de la Santísima Cruz de los Milagros in the city of Corrientes. Shortly after the founding of the city of Corrientes, the Spanish erected a wooden cross, which the indigenous inhabitants tried to burn, but it survived. On the sides of the cross and the flames there are seven triangles curved inwards, three on the left side (Note: "In heraldry, directions are determined from the viewpoint of the person holding the shield from behind.) and four on the other side, these triangles represent the seven peninsulas that the coast of Corrientes forms in the Paraná River at the site of the foundation of the city of Corrientes and which gave rise to the name of the city and province. The shield is surrounded by a laurel wreath tied with a white-blue ribbon. Above the shield is the rising Sun of May, which is one of the national symbols of Argentina. The coat of arms is very similar to the national coat of arms of Argentina, which does not contain the triangles, the cross and the fire, and differs in minor details.

== History ==
Belgrano flag

Flag of Corrientes when it belonged to the League

Flag of Corrientes when it belonged to the League

Flag of League of the Free Peoples (1815–1820) and Republic of Entre Ríos (1820–1821)

In 1812, the province of Corrientes began to use a white and blue flag designed by Manuel Belgrano, adopted four years later as the national flag of United Provinces of the Río de la Plata. On 17 December 1814, Captain José de Silva overthrew the then pro-centralist government and to distinguish himself from the government he overthrew, added red to the flag in early 1815. The bicolor flag continued to be used for some time in areas under the control of the Directory's troops. Red was the color of the federalists around José Artigas and the League of the Free Peoples led by him. Early Artigas flags had two red stripes in the middle of two blue stripes, although other compositions also occurred. Over time, the League switched to a new flag design with a red bend.

After the fall of the League following the Portuguese invasion of Banda Oriental, the flag continued to be used on the west side of the Uruguay River by Santa Fe, Entre Ríos and Corrientes. This changed in 1820 when Francisco Ramírez, Governor of Entre Ríos defeated Artigas, occupied Corrientes and declared its territory the Republic of Entre Ríos. Ramírez continued to use the red bend flag until his death during the campaign against Governor of Santa Fe, Estanislao López and the end of the republic.

Flag adopted by Juan José Blanco (1822-1823)

Flag adopted by Juan José Blanco (1823-1880's)

On 24 December 1821, Governor Juan José Fernández Blanco introduced the first flag symbolizing the province of Corrientes. This flag was based on the Belgrano flag, but instead of the sun it had the provincial coat of arms adopted in August. In March 1822, a similar flag, but with the coat of arms of his own province, was adopted by Blanco's ally, the governor of Entre Ríos, Lucio Norberto Mansilla. In 1823 the coat of arms was removed and instead a blue triangle was added on the hoist side. This flag remained official until the governments of the Generation of '80 restricted the autonomy of the provinces and centralized the country. Various variants have been used over the decades, including a flag with a painted coat of arms used by General José María Paz's troops in the Battle of Caaguazú in 1841, currently kept at the Provincial History Museum.

The current flag, combining the two previous flags, was adopted on 24 December 1986 by decree of the Provincial Executive. At the time of the adoption of the Corrientes flag, only 3 other Argentine provinces used flags, Santiago del Estero which had adopted the flag a year earlier and La Rioja and Santa Fe which adopted flags earlier in the same year.

== See also ==
- List of Argentine flags
- Flag of city of Corrientes
- Flag of Santa Fe Province
- Flag of Entre Ríos Province
