= Mocoví flag =

Flag of the Mocoví people

The Mocoví flag is the flag representing the Mocoví people, one of the Indigenous peoples of the Gran Chaco region, especially in the Argentine province of Chaco. The flag was officially adopted on 8 April 2010, by the City Council of Villa Ángela in Chaco. Subsequently, the Chaco provincial parliament recognized it as the official flag of the Mocoví ethnic group in Law No. 3439-W.

== Symbolism ==
The flag is divided into five stripes. Red symbolizes the period of suffering, particularly during the reign of Julio Argentino Roca, who undertook the "Conquest of the Chaco", while black signifies the uncertain future after that war. Light blue signifies the healing of historical wounds. The white and green stripes represent the Chaco plains.

Five symbols are also featured on the flag. The sun symbolizes purification of thought and hope for the future. The Ñandú bird (Mañik) and the Southern Cross (Nachishinaxanaxat) are symbols associated with myths. The flag also features the traditional No'xona jug and the quebracho tree, whose blossoms herald the arrival of the new year.

== See also ==
- List of Argentine flags
- Flag of Chaco (Argentina)
- Flag of the Mapuches
