= Flag of Río Negro Province =

Provincial flag of Río Negro, Argentina

Río Negro Province

The flag of the Río Negro Province is the official symbol of the Río Negro Province in Argentina. It consists of blue, white and green horizontal stripes, and a black canton containing thirteen stars symbolizing the departments of the province. The upper blue stripe represents justice and the abundance of water resources, and the black canton refers to the Río Negro, from which the province's name comes, meaning "Black River". The white stripe symbolizes the unity of the province, which in the second half of the 20th century experienced a conflict between the communities in the upper and lower reaches of the Río Negro. The green stripe represents hope and the fertility of the land.

== History ==
The history of the flag begins in 2008 when Río Negro was one of three provinces in the country without an official flag. The design was selected through a public competition, decided by a committee. 164 entries were submitted to the competition and anonymized before being presented to the committee. The contest was won in 25 March 2009 by Allen resident Daniel Cuomo, and also it turned out that his wife's work was among the ten finalists. The winning design was officially adopted by the Legislature on 4 June 2009. After the results were announced, attention was drawn to the use of blue-white-green tricolor from two pre-existing flags. The winning design stirred controversy as possible plagiarism and the symbolism as unpatriotic.

The similarity between the chosen flag and the flag designed around 1861 by Orélie Antoine de Tounens for the Kingdom of Araucanía and Patagonia that he was trying to organize was noted. De Tounens was a French lawyer who in late 1860 arrived in the Araucanía, then still controlled by the indigenous Mapuche people, and with the support of some lonkos declared himself a constitutional monarch. Although de Tounens' activities were limited to the area that is now Chile, the kingdom claimed all of Patagonia still under the control of the indigenous peoples, which conflicted with Argentina's claims. The kingdom was unable to resist the Army of Chile and fell the following year. De Tounens himself was deported to France and the flag was forgotten in America, but a group of French citizens inspired by his story founded the "Court in Exile" which still functions as a micronation and still uses the flag.

In addition blue-white-green tricolor were used for the province's unofficial logo in 2005. The logo depicted 16 stars surrounding a black silhouette of a Indio Comahue Monument on a background of three stripes. Although the graphic was not created as a flag in 2007, it was featured prominently as an unofficial flag on the online encyclopedia Wikipedia.

In response to the controversy, the government revealed the background of the competition. There was no attempt to repeal the flag.

Flag of the Kingdom of Araucanía and Patagonia (c. 1861)

Logo from 2005 and mistaken flag from 2007

== See also ==
- List of Argentine flags
