= Flag of Formosa Province =

Formosa Province

The flag used by the Formosa province in Argentine was selected in a public competition and adopted in 1991. The symbolism of the flag refers to the geographical features of the province.

== Symbolism ==
The colors light blue, white and gold are the colors of the national flag. The 9 stars symbolize the 9 departments into which the province is divided. The stars are located in the upper part of the white triangle symbolizing the region's location at the base of the Southern Cone. A green garland of bay leaves marks the Tropic of Capricorn which passes through the province.

== History ==
The idea of creating a flag for the province of Formosa arose during the 1991 Legislative Convention, which aimed to reform the provincial constitution of 1957. On 14 February of that year, during one of its sessions, deputy Miguel Bernardo Caja presented a motion, taking into account the suggestions of deputy Juan Carlos Díaz Roig. Discussions focused on formal issues, such as the requirements for participants in the flag design competition and the amount of prizes. On the same day, the competition was announced, which was initially scheduled to last until the end of the month, but was extended to 7 March. The competition was provincial in nature, and the main prize was 10,000,000 Argentine australs and a commemorative plaque.

On March 14, the jury announced the results. The first prize was awarded to the design signed with the pseudonym "Lapacho" by Maria Beatriz Saez and Walter Willimburgh. Their design stood out for its simplicity and strong symbolism, which made it easy to replicate in schools and institutions.

On May 15, 1991, the Constitutional Convention approved the results of the competition, establishing the flag as the official symbol of the province.

Original proposal submitted to the competition in 1991

Ricardo Ramón Nocetti's proposal which won first distinction in the competition

Eduardo F. Gaona's proposal which won third distinction in the competition

Lucía Hertelendy's proposal which won fourth distinction in the competition

Francisco Deolas's proposal which won sixth distinction in the competition

== See also ==
- List of Argentine flags
- Flag of Chaco (Argentina)
