= Flag of Chubut =

Chubut Province

The flag of Chubut, an Argentine province in central Patagonia, located between the Río Negro to the north and Santa Cruz to the south, has been in force since 6 January 2005.

== Symbolism ==
The flag consists of a light blue field crossed by three thin lines. At the top, a white zigzag line referring to the Andes mountain range, which forms the western border of the province, a yellow straight line in the middle, which symbolizes the Chubut River and other rivers that cross the territory, and a white wavy line, which symbolizes the Atlantic Ocean, which washes the coast to the east. In the center, there is a cogwheel and an ear of wheat, symbolizing industrial and agricultural activity. Inside the cogwheel is also the Florentino Ameghino Dam, drawn in oblique perspective. Above the cogwheel is the rising sun with 16 rays, which symbolize the 15 departments of the province and the area of jurisdiction over the sea, symbolically referred to as the department of Atlántico.

The second flag is flown on the buildings of institutions and schools in Chubut. It symbolizes the Mapuche and Tehuelche aboriginal communities, established by decree in 1991.

== History ==
In 1996, the first attempt was made to select a provincial flag at the request of the provincial legislature, however, the project was unsuccessful and the competition was declared invalid. At the time, the flag was deemed unnecessary because it would be a competing symbol with the national flag. The next competition took place in 2004 and was aimed at experienced graphic designers and high school students aged 14 and over. The winning flag in this competition was designed by Roxana Vanesa Jones, national professor of art. The winning design aimed to maintain unity with the provincial coat of arms used since 1964. The flag of Chubut, as the symbol of the province, was officially adopted on 6 January 2005 by Law V – No. 101 (formerly the number 5292 was used).

== See also ==
- List of Argentine flags
