= Flag of Salta =

Salta Province
- Use: Civil and state flag
- Proportion: 2:3
- Adopted: June 14, 1997; 29 years ago
- Designed by: Nélida Baigorria

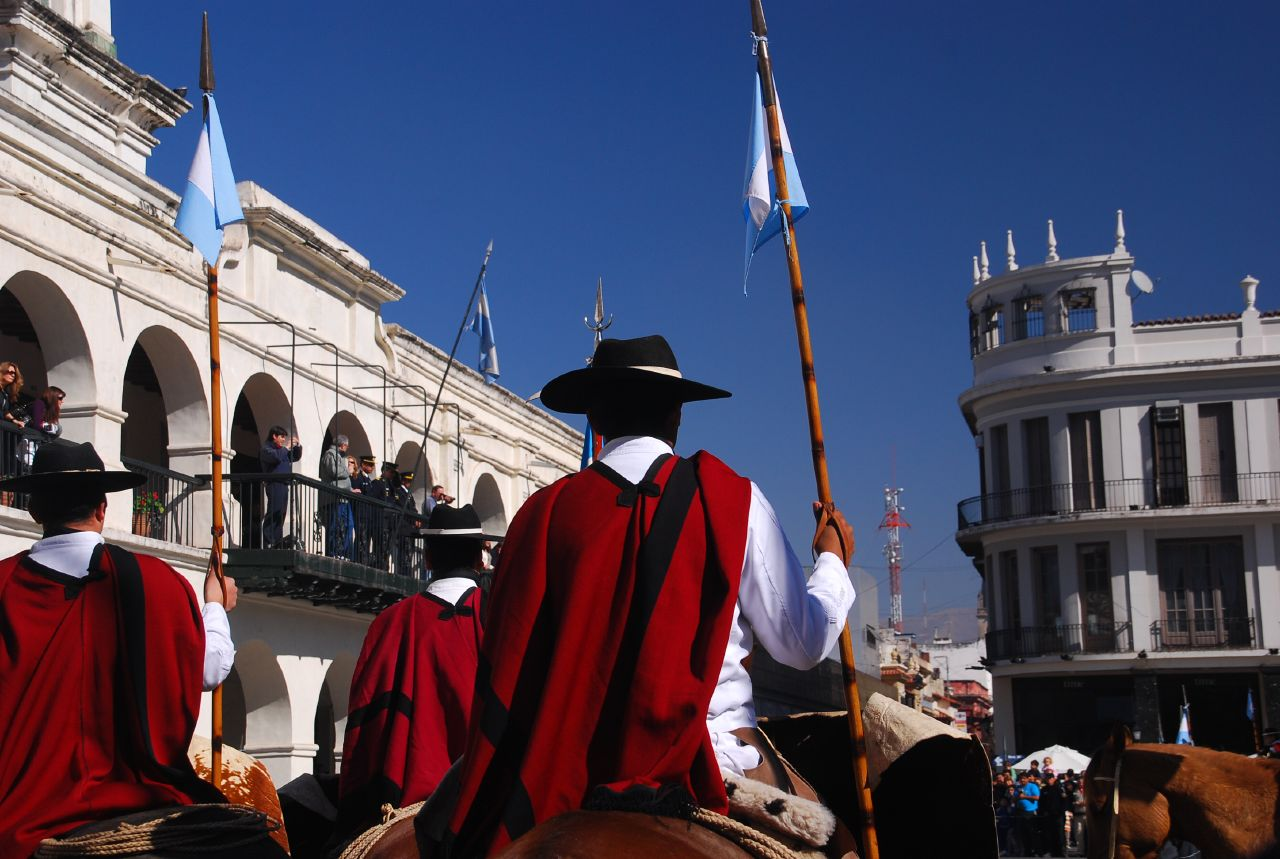
Salta Provincial Police Honor Guard parading wearing the traditional burgundy Salta poncho.

The flag of Salta is the official flag represents the Argentine province of Salta. The flag consists of the provincial coat of arms on a burgundy background. The coat of arms placed in the center is an oval, light blue shield with a white six-pointed star. In the center of the star is a cut-out circle with a Sun of May in it. Around the shield are 23 six-pointed gold golden gaucho spur called the Nazarene, that represent the 23 provincial departments. Burgundy and black is colors of the traditional Salta poncho (Ponchos of this type were worn by the Infernales led by Martín Miguel de Güemes, during the War of Independence).

October 8 marks the Day of the Flag of Salta in recognition of the province's establishment in 1814, when Gervasio Posadas, Supreme Director of the United Provinces of the Río de la Plata, issued a decree creating the Governorship of Salta. This act separated Salta from the government of Tucumán, forming a new province that included the territories of present-day Jujuy Province, Oran, Tarija, and Santa Maria.

== History ==
The flag of the province of Salta was supposed to have been chosen in 1996 in a contest announced by Governor Juan Carlos Romero. More than 4,000 designs were submitted. The winning design was submitted as the work of students from the 7th grade "A" at Nicolás Avellaneda School, although the authors were teacher Nélida Baigorria and her brother. Baigorria admitted in an interview after retiring that she had not had time to involve the children in the design and, after obtaining permission from the vice principal Edith Lemos de Ortíz, she carried out the project after work. Baigorria found out about the competition shortly before it ended, because that year the governor was in conflict with the education staff and although information about the competition was sent to the schools, it was not distributed. The work was ready on 22 November, the last day of the competition, but before it could be submitted, another teacher accidentally poured hot water on it. Due to this accident, with the permission of the Secretary of Culture, Marta Ceballos, the project was not submitted until 25 November.

On 16 February 1997, the victory of the project from Nicolás Avellaneda School was announced. That same day, the newspaper "El Tribuno" published a statement by the school's vice principal, Mrs. Edith Lemos de Ortiz, in which she said, among other things, "(the flag) was created as a result of several workshops during which the boys were informed about the historical roots of Salta...". As a reward for designing the flag, the school received 10 computers.

The flag of Salta was officially adopted by Law No. 6946 on 14 June 1997.
