= Selkʼnam flag =

Flag of the Selk'nam people

The Selkʼnam flag is the symbol identifying the Selk'nam people, an indigenous people originally inhabiting Tierra del Fuego in Argentina and Chile. The flag features a representation of the night sky with stars and a crescent moon, while the background of the flag is light blue.

== History ==
The original flag was created in the late 19th century, during a period when sheep farming companies in Tierra del Fuego were committing genocide against the indigenous population. The flag was sewn by a group of Selkʼnam girls living at the Salesian mission in San Rafael on Dawson Island, Chile, after the missionaries explained the concept of national flags. The stars on the flag are believed to symbolize ancestors, who, according to Selkʼnam mythology, become stars after death. The original flag is currently housed at the private Salesian Museum Maggiorino Borgatello in Punta Arenas, Chile.

== Arrow flag ==
Flag used by the Telkacher Chilean Selkʼnam community.

The flag consists of a background divided into two halves: brown at the top and white at the bottom. A black arrow divides the two halves horizontally from left to right, not reaching the right end. In the left corner of the brown background are also four yellow stars arranged in the constellation of the Southern Cross. These colors represent Tierra del Fuego, as the red symbolizes the northern pampas and the white the snowy forests of the south. The flag was created as part of the Selkʼnam campaign for legal recognition as an existing ethnic group.

The Selkʼnam flag inspired the colors of the Selknam Rugby Club, formed in 2019 as a tribute to the Selkʼnam people.

== See also ==
- Selknam genocide
