= Flag of Santa Cruz Province, Argentina =

Provincial flag

Santa Cruz Province

The flag of the province of Santa Cruz was adopted on 12 October 2000. The design was chosen from 149 designs in a competition held on 22 August 2000. The winning flag was designed by 27-year-old Santiago Sebastián Arenillas, who publicly presented his work in September in Río Gallegos, the capital of the province.

The sun refers to the Sun of May on the Argentine national flag, and in combination with the image of the sacred mountain Cerro Chaltén, it refers to the myths of the indigenous Aónikenk people. The peak is also depicted on the provincial coat of arms used since 1959. The waves symbolize the Atlantic Ocean, which is located to the east of Santa Cruz. Above the mountain, on the right side, is a small image of the Southern Cross, the constellation that is the symbol of the Southern Hemisphere.

Flag Day was established in the province on 23 November, the day after Santa Cruz was reorganized from a national territory into an autonomous province in 1956.

== See also ==
- List of Argentine flags
