= Vědomice =

- Municipality
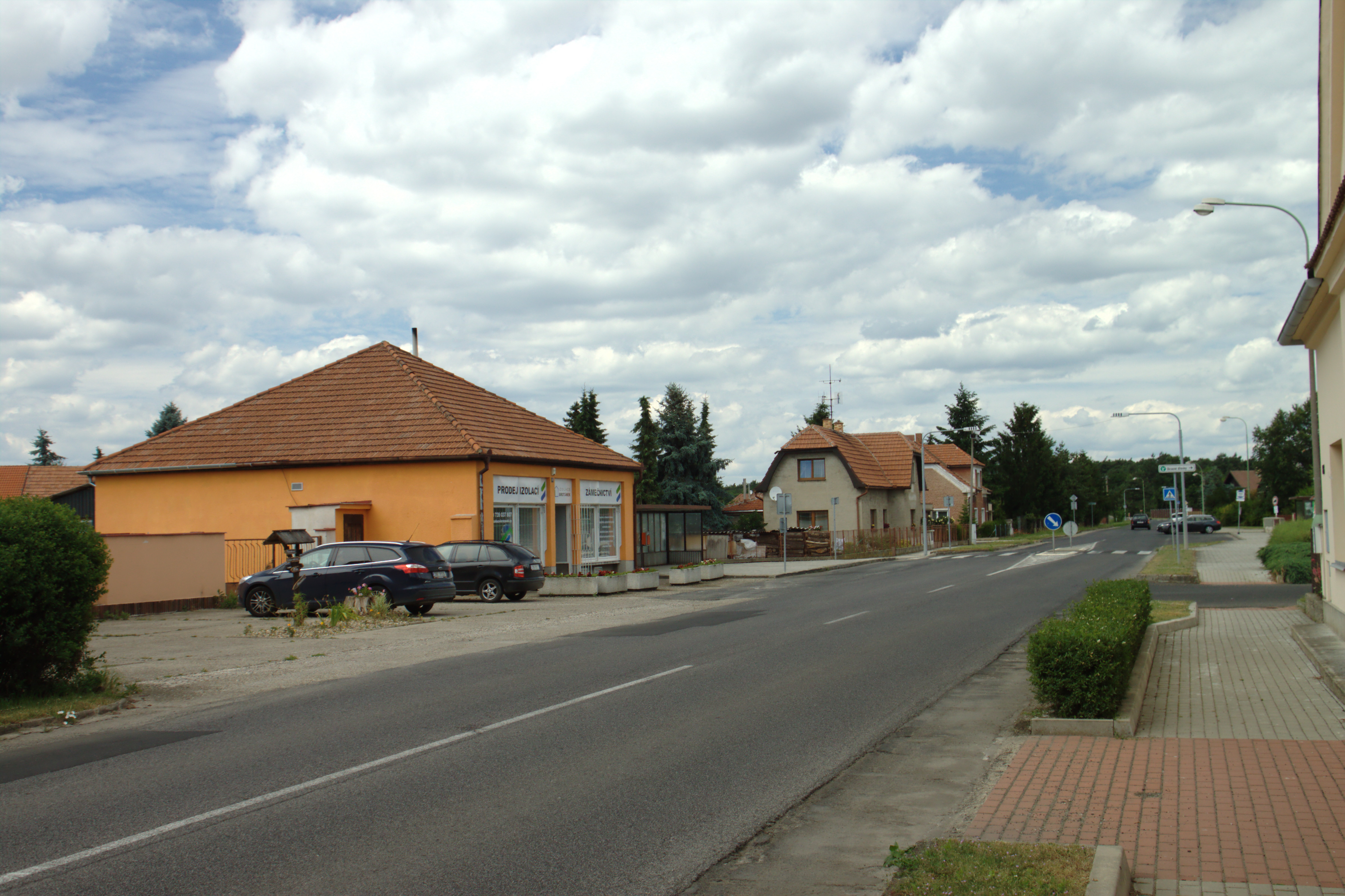
- Main street

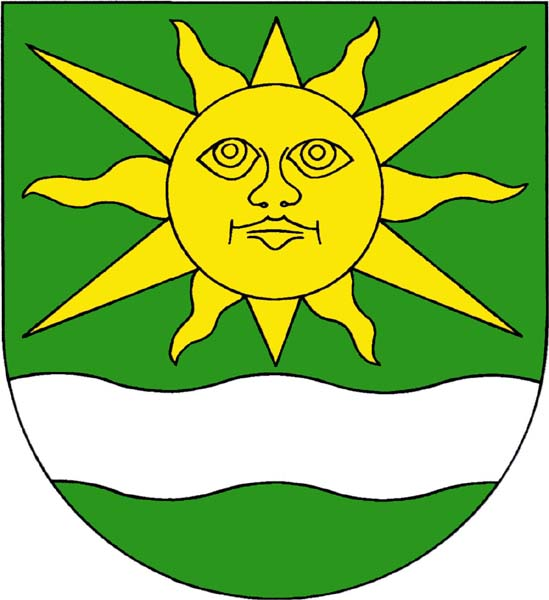
- Flag Coat of arms

- Location in the Czech Republic
- Coordinates: 50°26′2″N 14°15′14″E
- Country: Czech Republic
- Region: Ústí nad Labem
- District: Litoměřice
- First mentioned: 1555

Area
  - Total: 5.47 km^{2} (2.11 sq mi)
- Elevation: 155 m (509 ft)

Population (2026-01-01)
  - Total: 975
  - Density: 178/km^{2} (462/sq mi)
- Time zone: UTC+1 (CET)
  - Summer (DST): UTC+2 (CEST)
- Postal code: 413 01
- Website: www.vedomice.cz

Vědomice is a municipality and village in Litoměřice District in the Ústí nad Labem Region of the Czech Republic. It has about 1,000 inhabitants.

== Geography ==
Vědomice is located about 14 kilometres (9 mi) southeast of Litoměřice and 30 km (19 mi) southeast of Ústí nad Labem. It lies in the Lower Ohře Table. It is situated in a meander of the Elbe River.

== Demographics ==
Historical population
Year	Pop.	±%
1869	278	—
1880	296	+6.5%
1890	331	+11.8%
1900	321	−3.0%
1910	339	+5.6%
1921	393	+15.9%
1930	536	+36.4%
1950	504	−6.0%
1961	551	+9.3%
1970	568	+3.1%
1980	622	+9.5%
1991	631	+1.4%
2001	680	+7.8%
2011	855	+25.7%
2021	900	+5.3%
Source: Censuses
