= Flag of Neuquén Province =

Neuquén Province

The flag of the province of Neuquén was adopted in 1989 by resolution no. 2766 of 1989. It consists of three vertical stripes: light blue, white and light blue, which are the national colors. In the middle of the white stripe there are some elements of the provincial coat of arms, although they are presented differently on the flag than in the coat of arms.

In the center of the emblem is the silhouette of a monkey tail tree, a species native to the Andes in Neuquén. Under the tree is a poinsettia symbolizing the autonomy of the province, known in Argentina as the federal star, because red was the color of the federalist party. Behind the tree is the Lanín stratovolcano. These symbols are surrounded by a circle of 16 stars symbolizing the departments that make up the province and a laurel wreath reaching to the base of Lanín symbolizing glory, freedom and peace.

The flag design was selected in an open competition in 1989. The winner was pilot Mario Aldo Mástice, who also won the 1954 competition that selected the provincial coat of arms. The first provincial flag was raised for the first time on 28 November and that day is celebrated in the province as Flag Day.

== See also ==
- List of Argentine flags
