= Flag of San Juan Province, Argentina =

San Juan Province

The province of San Juan Province, Argentina in Argentina uses as its provincial flag the banner used by the 4th Division of the Army of the Andes during the Argentine War of Independence. The flag consists of a white stripe between two light blue stripes, forming an even, horizontal triband. This is a rare case of a flag whose two sides are clearly distinct from each other. The side showing the provincial coat of arms in the center is considered the obverse, while the reverse contains the Sun of May.

== History ==
The original flag was created when in 1816 in San Juan troops were formed for the expedition of the Army of the Andes to Chile. The coat of arms and the sun were painted on the national flag created several years earlier by Manuel Belgrano and recently adopted by the United Provinces of the Río de la Plata. The fabric was painted by Patricias Sanjuaninas, Borja Toranzo de Zavalla, Jacinta Angulo de Rojo, and Félix de la Roza de Junco (sister of the provincial governor), while Don José Rudecindo Rojo passed it to the 4th Division under the command of Juan Manuel Cabot. Because the flag was created as a gift from the citizens of the province to the army, it is called a "citizen flag" in contrast to other flags from the War of Independence era that were considered military. After the war, Cabot took the flag and settled in Buenos Aires. In 1888, his daughter gave the flag to Argentine President Bartolomé Mitre, and it was then placed in the National Historical Museum. In 2012, the flag was restored and then permanently moved to San Juan.

Obverse (1997-2018)

Reverse (1997-2018)

The first flag representing the province was adopted on 11 December 1997. That flag was based on the old Cabot soldiers' flag, but had a modern coat of arms design and an expanded white stripe. On December 21, 2018, significant changes were approved to bring the flag into line with the historic Cabot flag. Both the coat of arms on the obverse and the sun on the reverse were replaced with faithful reproductions of the original, the three stripes were realigned, and the light blue shade matches the shade established in 2010 for the national flag.

== See also ==
- Army of the Andes
- List of Argentine flags
