= Flag of Santiago del Estero Province =

Flag of the Argentine province of Santiago del Estero

Santiago del Estero Province

The flag used by the Santiago del Estero province in Argentina consists of five vertical stripes. The first stripe from the hoist side is light blue two tenths wide and white one tenth wide are symmetrical to the last two stripes: white one tenth wide and blue two tenths wide. The middle stripe is a red square four tenths wide and features a golden sun with a red Cross of Saint James in the center. Light blue and white are the Argentine national colors, while red represents the Federalist Party to which the province owes its autonomy. The sun refers to the Sun of May present on the national flag. The cross represents the Catholic and Spanish heritage of the region.

It is the oldest continuously used provincial flag in Argentina, approved by Law No. 5355 passed on 1985, although the use of the flag was clarified a year later by modifications to the law.

== See also ==
- List of Argentine flags
