= Mocoví =

Indigenous people of the Gran Chaco region of South America

Flag of Mocoví peoples

The Mocoví (Mocoví: moqoit) are an Indigenous people of the Gran Chaco region of South America. They speak the Mocoví language and are one of the ethnic groups belonging to the Guaycuru peoples. In the 2010 Argentine census, 22,439 people self-identified as Mocoví.

Not much is known about them before the Spanish arrived. They were nomadic and lived off of their fishing, hunting and gathering. They hunted deer and rhea and slept on animal skins and flimsy shelters. They did not farm because the soil conditions were poor where they roamed and there was flooding. Trade routes were discovered in the Chaco forest, indicating trading and it was assumed they traded skins and feathers for gold, silver and copper objects. When the Jesuits arrived, they taught the Mocoví to farm with cattle and they became sedentary.

In 1924, at least 200 Mocoví and Toba people were slaughtered during the Napalpí massacre. Argentina declared it a crime against humanity in 2019 and opened a 'truth trial' in 2022.
