= Argentine Red Cross =

- Cruz Roja Argentina
- Formation: June 9, 1880; 145 years ago
- Headquarters: Buenos Aires
- Website: www.cruzroja.org.ar

The Argentine Red Cross (Spanish: Cruz Roja Argentina) was founded in 1880 and it has its headquarters in Buenos Aires.

== See also ==
- International Red Cross and Red Crescent Movement
