= Flag of Chaco (Argentina) =

Flag of Argentine province of Chaco

Chaco Province

The flag of the Argentine province of Chaco is rectangular, divided into three vertical stripes, light green, white and light blue. In the middle stripe there is also a symbol of the Sun of May at the top and a plough surrounded by twenty-five golden stars at the bottom. The stars represent the twenty-five departments in the province. The plough symbolizes agriculture, which is the most important sector of the province's economy and is also found on the coat of arms.

== History ==
Flag of Chaco (1995–2007)

Chaco became a province in 1951 under the name Presidente Perón Province. At that time the province did not have a flag, but its coat of arms was based on the shield of the Justicialist Party.

The first Chaco flag was officially proclaimed by decree on 2 February 1995 as the provincial flag by the government of Governor Rolando Tauguinas. It was designed by graphic artist Jorge Esquivel and won an art contest. The flag was met with negative reception, as the local press considered the proposed flag "not a symbol, but a painting." The majority of the population did not feel represented by the emblem. This flag remained in force, but almost unused.

The modern flag was approved on 19 September 2007, under Governor Roy Nikisch.

== See also ==
- List of Argentine flags
- Flag of Resistencia, Chaco
