= Flag of La Pampa =

La Pampa

The flag of the Argentine province of La Pampa is divided into three horizontal stripes, light blue, white and light blue. This is the same color scheme as the national flag of Argentina, but the difference is the Sun of May, which on the flag of La Pampa is obscured by the coat of arms of the province.

== Symbolism ==
The shield visible on the flag is divided into two parts: the upper, blue, symbolizes justice, perseverance and loyalty, while the lower, green, reflects hope, hospitality and kindness, and also refers to the vast plain of the Pampas. On the blue part is the Caldén tree. Below the tree is the silhouette of an indigenous man walking through the vast pastures with a spear in his hand, commemorating the ancient defenders of these plain. The shield is surrounded by ears of wheat, symbolizing the fertility of the soil and the agricultural wealth of the province. The crossed spears behind the shield, decorated with a small plume, also refer to the first indigenous inhabitants of this region.

== History ==
The coat of arms in the center of the flag was designed and adopted in 1964. The idea of adopting the first provincial flag was put forward by the then provincial deputy Héctor De la Iglesia in 1989. The aim of the undertaking was to promote the culture of the province and the federalism that was being reborn after a period of authoritarianism. De la Iglesia developed a bill to announce a competition to select the flag. The competition was never held, but later that same year Dr. Miguel Carrillo Bascary approached the governor of La Pampa directly with his own proposals, based on traditional indigenous patterns.

The flag issue came up again in 1993, during the constitutional reform process. Lawyer José Carlos Ricci included a drawing of his proposed flag in his influential publication "The Constitutional Reform of La Pampa and Its Foundations". In the original design the flag was longer and the coat of arms overlapped all the stripes. Ricci's proposal was accepted, but the flag was adopted by provincial resolution no. 1513, rather than as an article in the constitution. The resolution also changed the design, simply defining the flag as identical to the national flag with the coat of arms placed in the middle of the white stripe. The flag was adopted on 10 August 1994, and officially presented on 16 October, the same day that members of the Chamber of Deputies took the oath to the new constitution.

Miguel Carrillo Bascary's proposal

Miguel Carrillo Bascary's proposal

Miguel Carrillo Bascary's proposal

Miguel Carrillo Bascary's proposal

Miguel Carrillo Bascary's proposal

Miguel Carrillo Bascary's proposal

Miguel Carrillo Bascary's proposal

Original proposal by José Carlos Ricci in 1993

== See also ==
- List of Argentine flags
