= Flag of La Rioja Province, Argentina =

La Rioja Province

The flag of La Rioja is a symbol of the Argentine province of La Rioja, it consists of two stripes, the lower one is blue and the upper one is white and diagonal red. In the center there are two laurel branches, the flowers of which symbolize the eighteen provincial departments. Blue and white are the national colours of Argentina, while red symbolises federalism, historically strong in the province. When the flag is displayed indoors, a blue and white ribbon is added to the mast with the inscription in black letters "La Rioja For National Unity And Latin America" (Spanish: "La Rioja Por La Unidad Nacional Y Latinoamericana"). The flag was created in 1986, during the work on the new constitution of the province after the return of democracy to Argentina. The flag initiative put forward by Domingo Carlos Tulián was adopted after little debate and without controversy. The flag's designer was Antonia Lucía Rivero. In 1987, Law No. 4891 was passed, which regulates the use of the provincial flag. The exact shades of colors and details of the wreath were never adopted, so different copies of the flag may differ from each other.

== See also ==
- Artigas flag
- List of Argentine flags
