= Sun of May =

National emblem of Argentina and Uruguay

The Sun of May as it appears in the current version of the flag of Argentina (left) and Uruguay (right).

The Sun of May (Sol de Mayo) is one of the national emblems of Argentina and Uruguay, appearing on both countries’ national flags and coats of arms. It takes its name from the May Revolution of 1810, which marked the beginning of the independence process in the Viceroyalty of the Río de la Plata. The sun is commonly interpreted as a symbol of the birth of a new nation, a meaning also reflected in the Argentine National Anthem approved by the Assembly of the Year XIII in 1813.

The first official use of the sun as a national symbol occurred in 1813, when the Assembly of the Year XIII adopted it on its seal (later the basis of the Argentine coat of arms) and on the first national coins minted in Potosí. The design is generally attributed to the Cuzco-born engraver Juan de Dios Rivera, working under commission from the Assembly. The sun was added to the Argentine war flag on 25 February 1818 by decree of the Congress under Supreme Director Juan Martín de Pueyrredón.

The design consists of a golden disc with a human face, from which rays emerge alternating between straight and wavy (flaming). The Argentine version has 32 rays (16 straight and 16 wavy), while the Uruguayan version follows the more common European heraldic convention of 16 rays.

It is frequently claimed that the Sun of May represents Inti, the Inca sun god. This interpretation, popularized mainly by the historian Diego Abad de Santillán in the 20th century, lacks contemporary documentary support from the revolutionary period. No primary sources from 1813–1818 explicitly identify the emblem with Inti. The design is more accurately understood as deriving from the long-established European heraldic charge known as the “sun in splendour” (a face surrounded by alternating straight and wavy rays), which was already common in Spanish and European iconography, including ecclesiastical and military uses in the colonial period. Some authors have also noted possible Masonic influence, given the prominence of Freemasonry among the revolutionary leadership (including Belgrano and San Martín) and the sun’s traditional association with light and reason in Masonic symbolism.

Throughout the rest of the 19th century, the sun appeared in numerous distinct designs on flags, notably in red during the government of Juan Manuel de Rosas, as well as on coins, with significant variations across each province. At the beginning of the 20th century, historical studies on the flag and coat of arms emerged, with proposals aimed at aligning the sun's design with that of the 1810s. However, it was not until 1944 that a definitive regulation was established, finalizing the design of the Sun of May based on the first national coins of 1813. Finally, in 1985, it was established that the only Argentine flag was the one with the sun, eliminating the obligation for civilians to use the sunless version.

In the case of Uruguay, it was constituted as a country in 1828 at the end of the Cisplatine War, which confronted the United Provinces of the Río de la Plata and the Empire of Brazil for the control of the Banda Oriental, and chose national symbols linked to those of Argentine independence. Similar to the Argentine case, the sun used in Uruguay's coat of arms and flag underwent numerous variations until its current design was formalized in 1952. This decree also standardized the color of the flag's stripes as blue, distinct from the light blue used in Argentina's flag.

== History ==
=== Origin and first uses ===
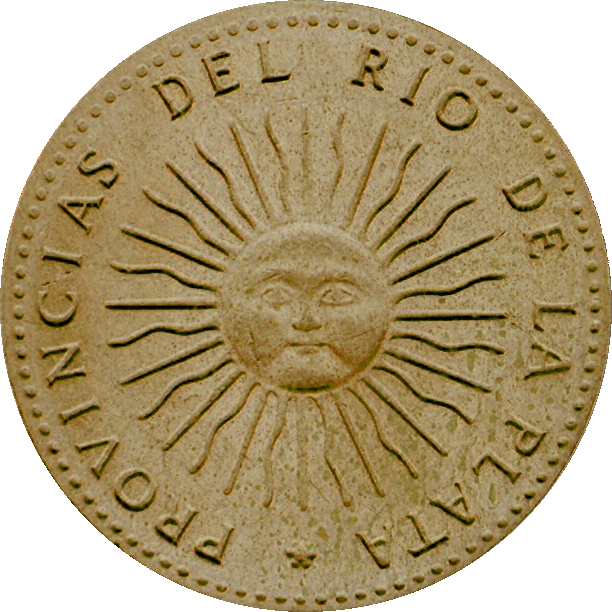
The sun was formally used as a symbol of the nascent United Provinces of the Río de la Plata for the first time in 1813, when the Assembly of Year XIII incorporated it in its official seal (left)—which later became the coat of arms of Argentina—and in the first national coins (right). The sun design of the latter is the one used in the current flag of Argentina.

The first use of the sun as a symbol in the Río de la Plata region was in late 1810, as an insignia on military uniforms. However, the first formal use of the sun was in the official seal of the Assembly of Year XIII (so named because it was held in 1813), a constituent assembly for the nascent United Provinces of the Río de la Plata, the successor state to the Viceroyalty of the Río de la Plata after the Spanish authorities in the capital Buenos Aires were removed in the May Revolution (from which the Sun of May takes its name) of 25 May 1810. In 1944, the seal was officially declared as the national coat of arms of Argentina through a presidential decree. Since the forces of Buenos Aires were occupying the city of Potosí in Upper Peru at that time, the Assembly of Year XIII also decided that the Spanish real coinage made at the Mint of Potosí should change its design. The legislators determined that the obverse of the new coins should have the seal of the assembly but without the rising sun, which instead appeared in its entirety on the reverse, a sign of the importance it had as a symbol of the new nation. Although the sun of these coins is considered to be the same as that of the seal of the Assembly of the Year XIII, there is a slight difference between the two: in the former, the flaming rays all have the same direction, varying their orientation depending on their issue, while in the latter the rays alternate between hourly and counterclockwise. The sun's design incorporates 32 rays, twice the typical 16 rays found in European heraldry.

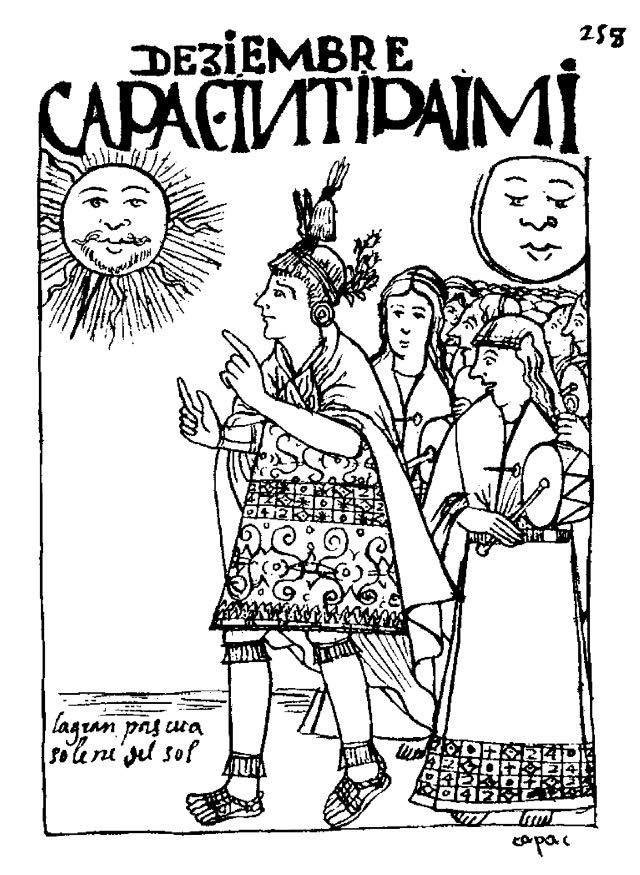
The Cápac Raymi, an annual feast celebrating the December solstice.

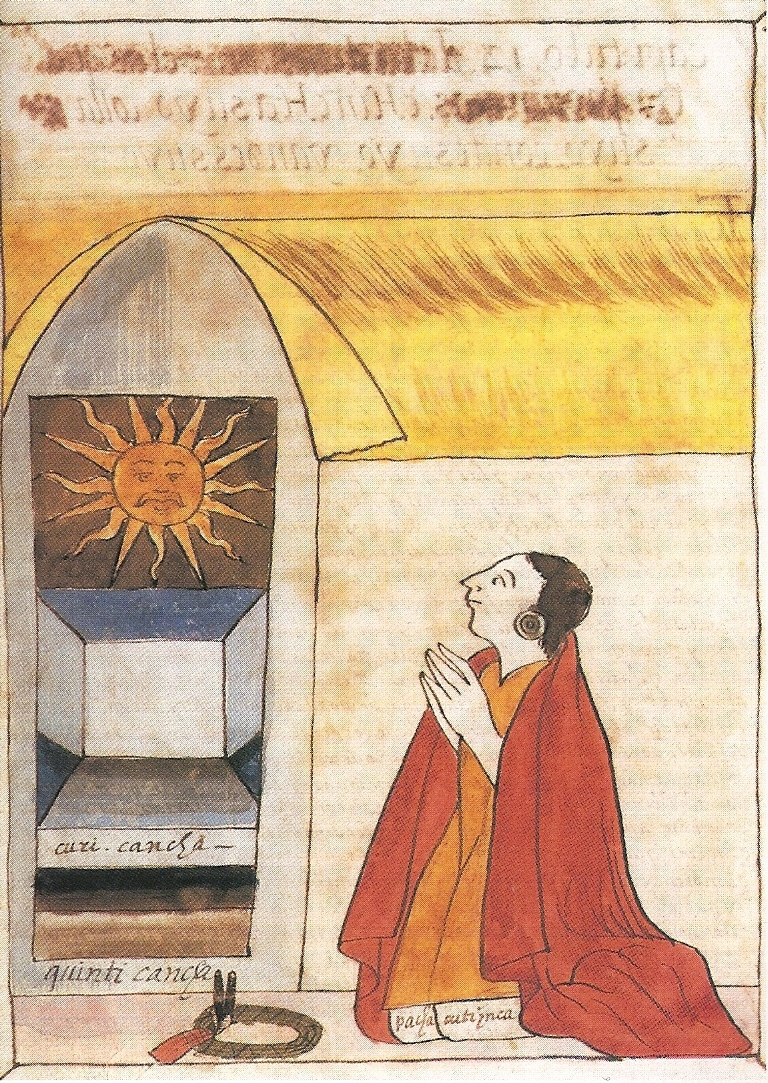
The Sapa Inca Pachacuti praying at the Coricancha temple.

The most widespread explanation locates the origin of the Sun of May in the Inca worship of the solar god Inti, here depicted in two books from c. 1615: El primer nueva corónica y buen gobierno (left) and Martín de Murúa's chronicles (right).

The Sun of May is also known as the "Inca sun" (Spanish: "sol incaico"), as the most widespread explanation states it represents Inti, the solar god of the Incas. The supposed Inca origin of the symbol is often related to the fact that the national coat of arms was made by Juan de Dios Rivera, a goldsmith of Inca descent originally from Cusco but based in Buenos Aires. For this reason, he is regarded by some as the creator of the Sun of May. However, there are no primary sources to confirm this, especially because the minutes of the Assembly of Year XIII disappeared after 1852, when they were inventoried by the Ejército Grande following the Battle of Caseros. In reality, Rivera followed the instructions he received from the government, and recent research has demonstrated the existence of a French revolutionary emblem from late 18th century that served as a model for the seal.

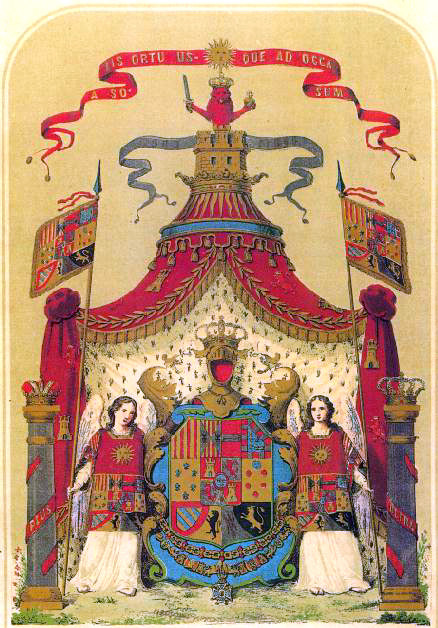
The ornamented royal coat of arms of the Kings of Spain during the Bourbon era, featuring a sun alongside the motto "a solis ortu usque ad occasum".

Although widely accepted, the supposed Inca origin of the Sun of May lacks contemporary sources and emerged only with the development of the country's historiography. In a 1900 letter addressed to José María Gutiérrez, Bartolomé Mitre wrote: "The revolution was dominated by the idea of promoting a new uprising of the Inca masses against Spanish domination in Upper Peru. The adoption of the heraldic Sun in the national coat of arms was, undoubtedly, a motive of attraction and reverence for the indigenous Quechua and Aymara peoples who worshipped the sun." However, Mitre also pointed out in this letter that, in his opinion, the inclusion of the sun on the seal of the Assembly of the Year XIII was a reference to the sun that accompanied the Latin motto "A solis ortu usque ad occasum" in ornamented versions of the coat of arms of the Kings of Spain. This is related to the fact that the independence process in Argentina began when news of the destitution of King Ferdinand VII by Napoleon Bonaparte arrived in Buenos Aires, causing the viceroy to be dismissed by the local elite under a professed loyalty to the absent king, something known as the "mask of Ferdinand VII". The sun motif was commonly featured in Bourbon-era military decorations in both continental Spain and its American colonies, typically depicted as a radiant star with numerous rays shining brightly over the entire field, and less frequently in its heraldic form. The sun was also frequently used in wooden, fabric or painted cardboard decorations used for funeral ceremonies, oaths of allegiance to new monarchs, and prominent displays in towns and cities. In addition to theories linking the Sun of May's origin to European heraldry, some suggest a possible Masonic influence, connecting the emblem to Freemasonry's iconography.

=== Use in the Argentine flag and design evolution ===
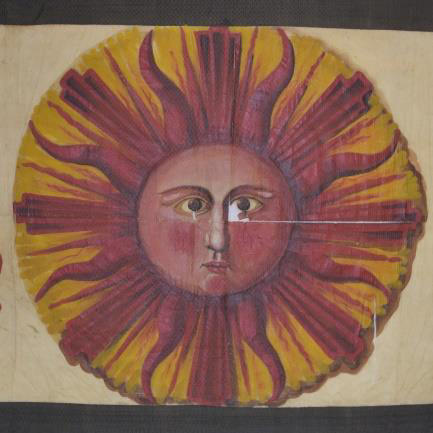
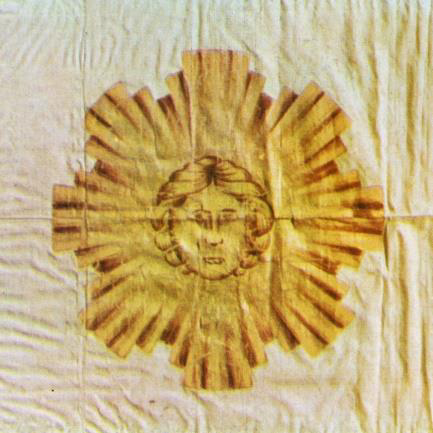
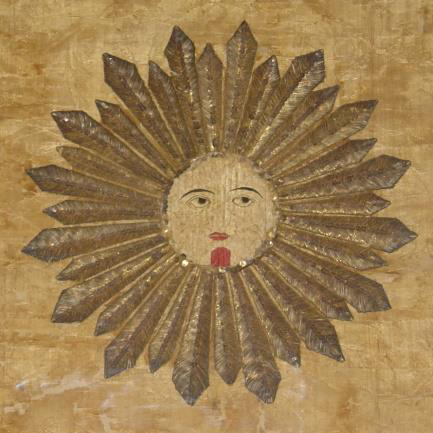
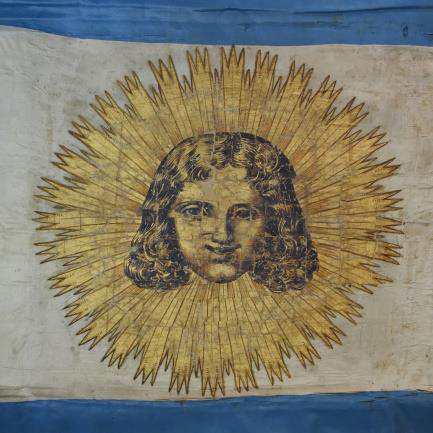
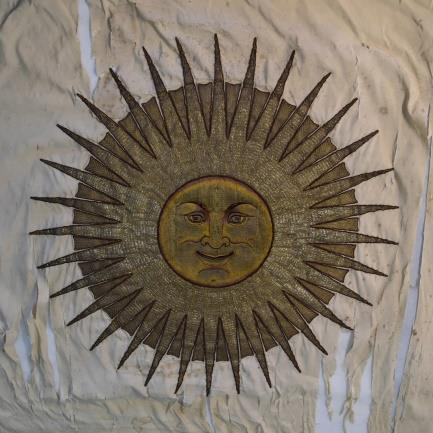
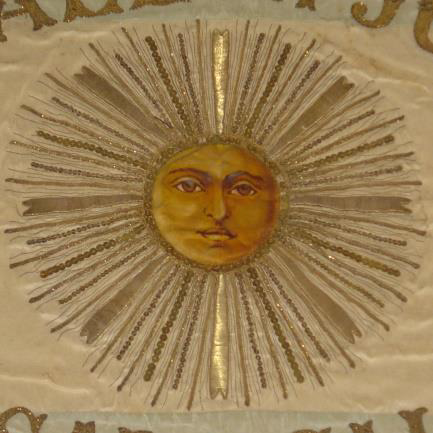
Diverse designs of the Sun of May on 19th-century Argentine flags, reflecting the lack of standardized regulations for the emblem during that period.

Some years after the first coins were minted in Potosí, the sun was incorporated into the national flag of Argentina. Initially, the Congress of Tucumán legalized the flag formed by three horizontal stripes of light blue, white and light blue as a "minor flag" until the form of government to be adopted by the United Provinces of the Río de la Plata was defined. Although this form of government was not yet defined, defining a flag for military use became urgent to differentiate warships from merchant ships. As a result, in early 1818, under Supreme Director Juan Martín de Pueyrredón, it was legislated that: "serving to every national flag the two colors white and blue in the manner and form hitherto customary, be distinctive peculiar to the flag of war, a sun painted in the middle of it." The decree does not give details about the meaning of the sun or its origin, limiting itself to decreeing its use and the function of the new "flag of war". In the Constitution drafted in 1819, a form of government was not defined, so the "greater flag" remained unregulated, while in the Constitution proclaimed in 1826 the republican form of government was formally defined, although the question of the flag was forgotten. Instead, the "flag of war" gradually came to be used as a sort of "greater flag," representing the national state broadly and not just for military purposes, while the version without the sun was reserved for merchant vessels and civilian use.

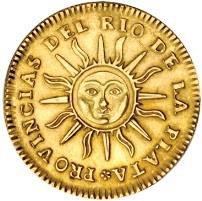
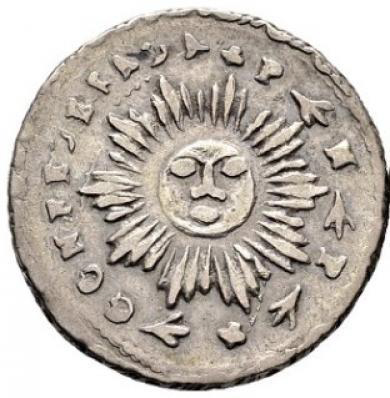
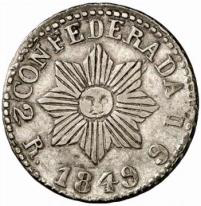
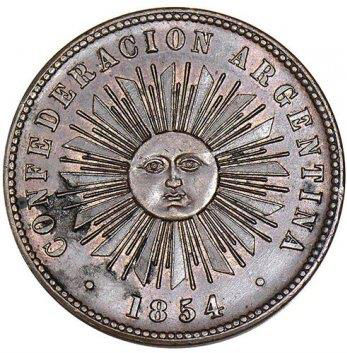
View of different designs of the Sun of May on various coins minted in Argentina during the 19th century.

Although the existing legislation mandated the inclusion of a sun on the flag, it provided no specific details about its design, leading to a wide variety of sun designs throughout the 19th century, with differences in proportions, the number and shape of rays, facial features, and other elements. Virtually no two flags had the same sun and, in some cases, with some designs becoming highly intricate, reflecting the elaborate styles prevalent in European heraldry throughout the century. While the legislation left the sun's color unspecified, it was typically assumed to be yellow—and even designated as embroidered in gold in the Supreme Director's band on the same day the "war flag" was officially adopted—during Juan Manuel de Rosas' era, the distinctive feature was the occasional use of a red sun, as this color was one of the symbols of adherence to the ruler and to the Federalist cause. The absence of a standardized sun design was evident in numismatics as well, as most provincial coinage featured varied sun designs, except the coins from La Rioja, which replicated the 1813 and 1815 Potosí coins. Notable examples of the diverse sun designs appearing in full form on one side of a coin include the reverses of all Córdoba Province coins and the obverses of the Argentine Confederation's copper coins.

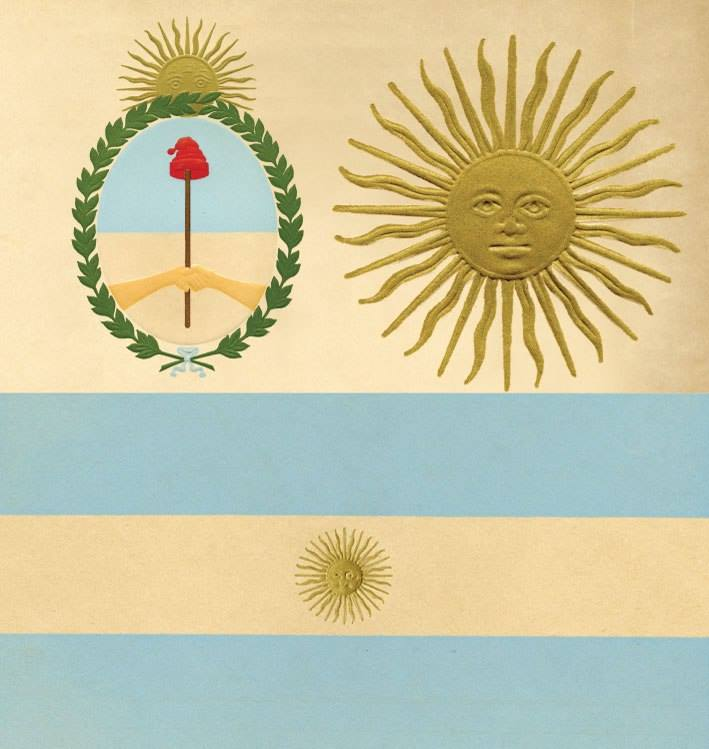
The official Argentine coat of arms, Sun of May and flag as reglamented in the Decree 10302/44 of 1944.

In the late 19th century, concerns over inconsistent flag and coat of arms designs emerged, prompting the Chancellery to regulate the models to be used in the consulates in 1885. By 1900, figures like José Manuel Eizaguirre, Mariano Pelliza and Estanislao Zeballos began research on flags and coats of arms. Zeballos advocated for a simplified national coat of arms, echoing the 1810s design. As Minister of Foreign Affairs in 1907, he officialized his proposal, yet varied designs of coats of arms and suns on flags continued to appear. The actual regulation of the patriotic symbols did not arrive until the 1940s, promoted by historian Dardo Corvalán Mendilaharsu, who proposed that the sun of the flag should be the same as that of the first coins of the country during a conference he gave in May 1942 at the National Academy of History. This academy submitted a draft bill to the national Executive Power to regulate the flag's sun design, which was never enacted. After the 1943 coup d'état, the new military government, with guidance from Dardo Corvalán Mendilaharsu, standardized the design through Decree 5256/43. This decree stipulated that the official flag and presidential sash of Argentina incorporate the sun from the 1813 Potosí coins, featuring thirty-two alternating flaming and straight rays, consistent with the coins' arrangement, and designated gold yellow as the sun's color.

During the rule of general Edelmiro Julián Farrell, the important Decree 10302/44 regulated the patriotic symbols and set out a series of statements based on historical research. It regulated the official design of the flag, the national coat of arms and the design of the sun, which it defined in similar terms to those of the previous 1943 decree: "In the center of the white band of the official flag, the figurative sun of the eight escudos gold coin and the eight reales silver coin engraved on the first Argentine currency, by law of the Sovereign General Constituent Assembly of April 13, 1813, shall be reproduced, with the thirty-two flaming and straight rays placed alternately and in the same position as seen on those coins. The color of the sun will be the yellow of gold." The decree also determines those authorized to use the flag with sun, allowing individuals to use only the flag without sun. Decades later, Law 23,208 of 1985, enacted by Decree 1,541 of the same year, established the sun-emblazoned Argentine flag as the sole national flag for all, a standard that persists today.

=== In Uruguay ===
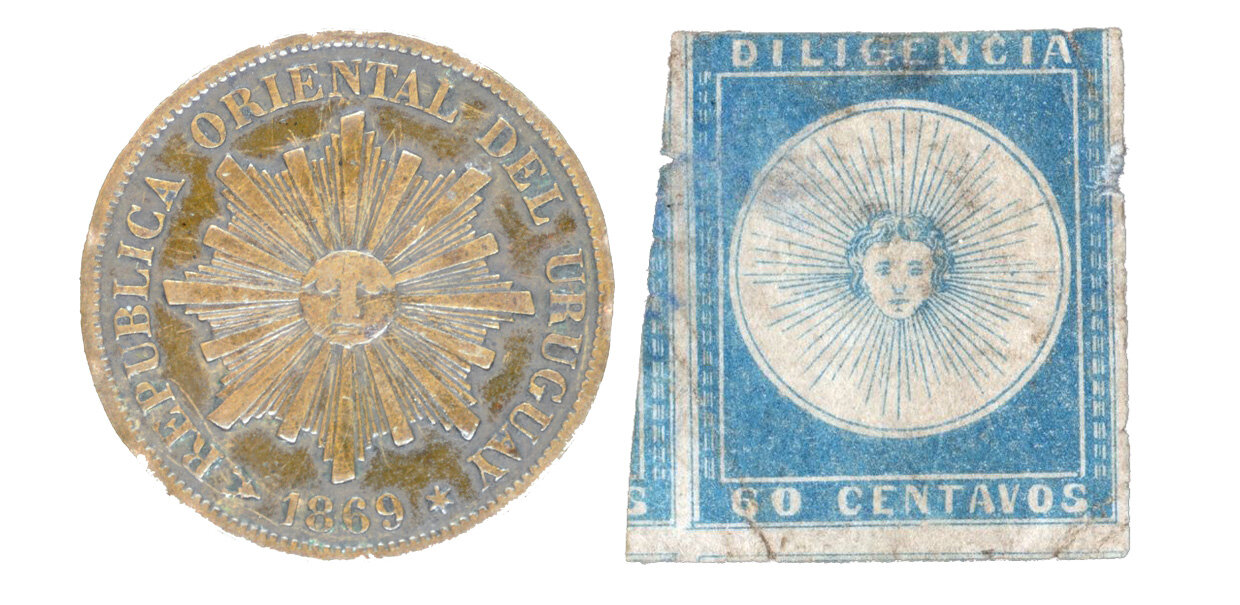
The Sun of May as seen in an Uruguayan peso coin of 1869 (left) and in the first Uruguayan postage stamp of 1856 (right).

In 1828, at the end of the Cisplatine War, which confronted the United Provinces of the Río de la Plata and the Empire of Brazil for the control of the Banda Oriental, both countries signed a peace negotiation, with diplomatic intervention by the United Kingdom, in which they gave birth to the new independent state of Uruguay. At the end of that year, the new state adopted its first official flag, composed of 9 white stripes alternated with 9 light blue stripes (in reference to the nine departments that composed the country at the time) and the Sun of May in the upper left corner, taking the symbolism of the Argentine independence. Later, a few days before the swearing in of the Constitution in July 1830, the design of the flag was modified: the 9 light blue stripes were reduced to 4, which totaled 9 alternating stripes and thus maintained the symbolism of the departments. The law also determined that the design of the sun should be the same as that of the national coat of arms.

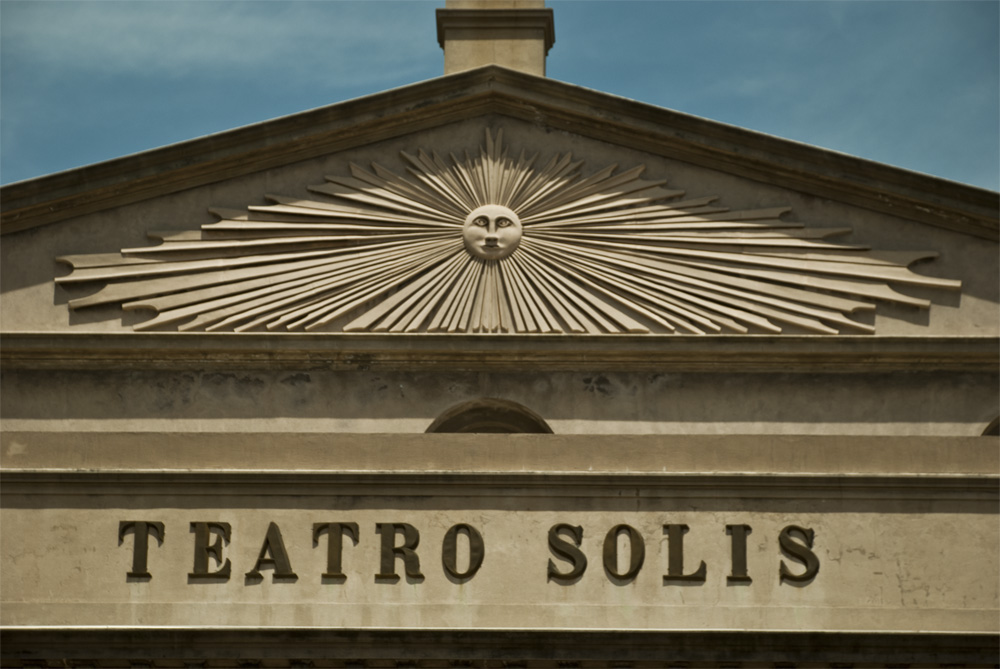
The Sun of May as seen in the façade of the Teatro Solís in Montevideo.

The sun was one of the aspects of the Uruguayan flag that changed the most over time, since the original law of creation only mentions a "white square in which the sun will be placed", which resulted in there being no regulations in its design. Despite the great variety of styles used in the 19th century, the most common design of the sun consisted of a "small faceted disk (with a face), with a multiplicity of straight rays joined together on its sides, of varying lengths and widths, thinner at its base, so that it formed an irregular outer 'circle' with as many points as there were rays." This "radiant sun" with multiple straight rays was characteristic of the era, appearing in various forms across flags, as well as on coins from 1840 to 1969, the first Uruguayan postage stamp, the facade of the Teatro Solís, and numerous public buildings and official publications. Some versions even depicted a figurative sun with a face and hair, as seen on coins from 1844 and 1869.

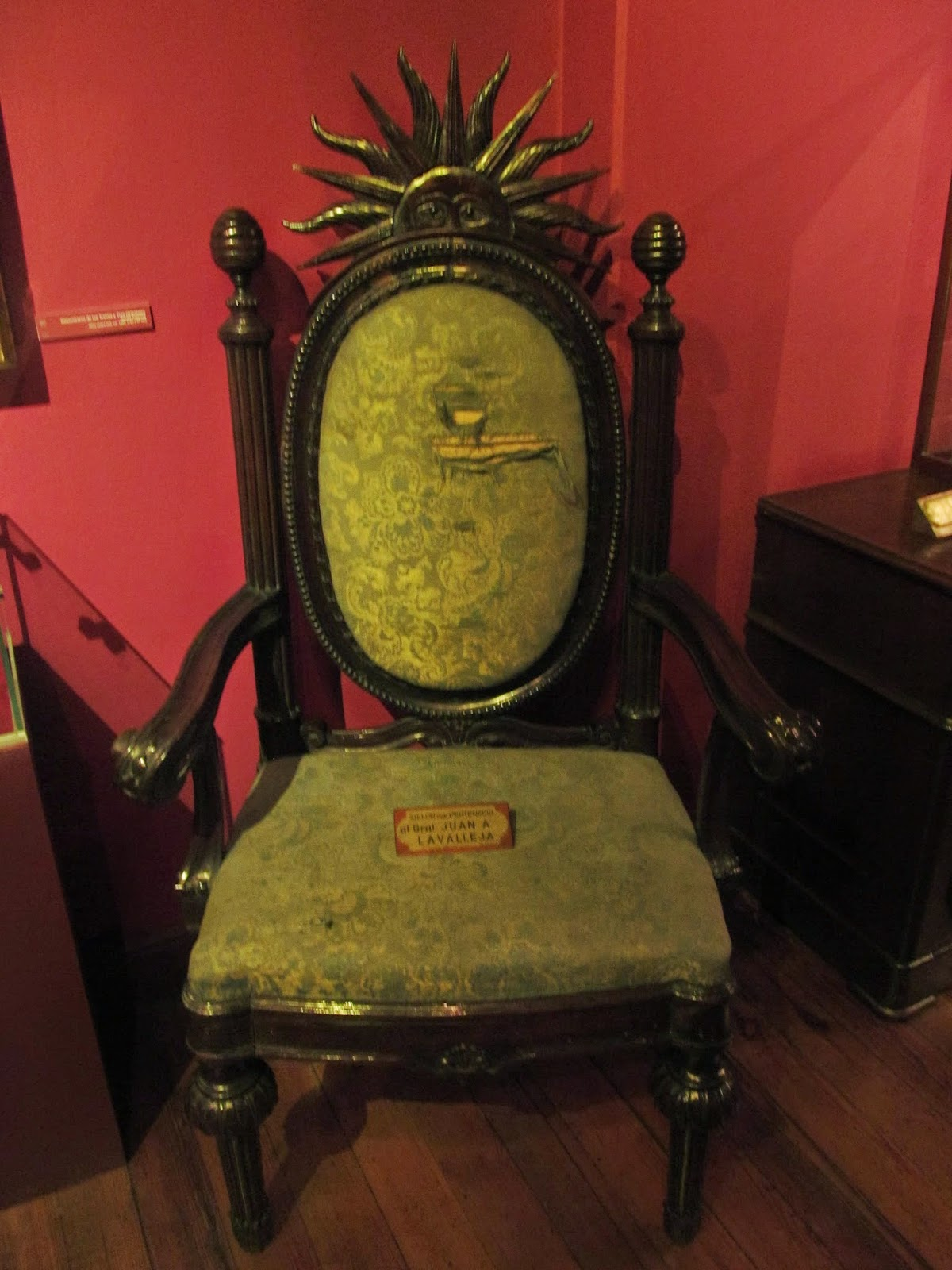
The chair of general Juan Antonio Lavalleja, with a carved sun that has been pointed out as an influence in the design of the one on the Uruguayan flag.

By the mid-19th century, the design began to shift toward a simpler, more uniform sun, often represented as a circle with rays of equal length. This style is evident in historical artworks, such as Pedro Blanes Viale's painting The Oath of the 1830 Constitution and Cándido López's depictions of regimental flags. Photographic records from the time, including an 1869 studio portrait of soldiers and images from the early 20th-century magazine Rojo y Blanco, confirm the prevalence of this circular, radiant sun design. These photographs, capturing events like the 1900 Independence Day celebrations and the laying of the cornerstone for the Women's Correctional Facility, show flags with large, compact suns resembling those on the national coat of arms. However, variations persisted, with some flags featuring unique designs, such as one with eight spiked rays on a small central circle, reflecting the creative freedom of flagmakers.

The design of the Sun of May on the flag evolved independently of changes to the national coat of arms, which underwent significant revisions through laws enacted in 1906 and 1908. While the coat of arms adopted a new sun design in 1908, featuring seven straight and eight flame-like rays, the flag's sun retained its radiant, multi-rayed form for some time. The 1906 law simplified the coat of arms by replacing war trophies with olive and laurel branches tied with a light blue ribbon, while the 1908 decree introduced a new sun design by Miguel J. Coppetti, featuring seven straight rays alternating with eight flame-like rays. This design, strikingly similar to a carved sun on general Juan Antonio Lavalleja's chair (preserved in the Museo Histórico Nacional), adhered to European heraldic conventions, which prescribed sixteen alternating straight and wavy rays for solar symbols. Despite these changes to the coat of arms, the flag's sun retained its radiant, multi-rayed form well into the 1920s.

It wasn't until the 1920s that the flag's sun began to align more closely with the modern design, incorporating alternating straight and flame-like rays. This transition became more pronounced by 1930, as seen in photographs from the first FIFA World Cup, where the flag displayed a sun closely resembling today's version. The harmonization of the flag and coat of arms was finalized in 1952, when a decree specified the flag's design, mandating a golden sun with sixteen rays—alternating straight and flame-like—set within a white square, formalizing the modern design of the Uruguayan Sun of May. By 1930, the flag displayed a sun with alternating straight and flame-like rays, as seen in photographs from the first FIFA World Cup, closely resembling the modern design. There was a gradual alignment between the Sun of May of the flag and the coat of arms, driven by practical usage rather than formal legislation. The harmonization of these national symbols was not officially codified until February 18, 1952, when a decree from the Executive Power established the flag's definitive characteristics: white and blue stripes, with a golden Sun of May occupying a white square, comprising a radiant circle with a face and sixteen rays—alternating straight and flame-like—with a diameter 1.2 times the width of the white square.

=== In Peru ===
This symbol is also used in the flag of some flags of early Peru.

Flag of March 1822

The flag of March 1822 uses a red version. It was designed by José Bernardo de Tagle. He Also designed the flag May 1822 of Peru which also has the same version.

The flag of the republic of south Peru

The flag of south Peru and the flag of the Peru-Bolivian confederation use the same variant of the sun with has more and smaller rays which makes the sun look like a multi point star. The face is the same as the Argentinian version

== See also ==
- National symbols of Argentina
- National symbols of Peru
- National symbols of Uruguay

Flag of the Peru–Bolivian Confederation

- Solar symbol
- Sunburst
