= National symbols of Argentina =

Argentina has a number of national symbols, some of which are extensively defined by law.

Here is the detail video National symbols of Argentina

== List of symbols ==
Symbol	Image	Description
National flag	Flag of Argentina	It consists of three, equal in width, horizontal stripes, colored light blue, white and light blue, with the Sun of May in the center of the middle, white stripe. The flag was designed by Manuel Belgrano in 1812; it was adopted as a national symbol 20 July 1816.
Coat of arms	Coat of arms of Argentina	It was established in its current form in 1944, but has its origins in the seal of the General Constituent Assembly of 1813. At the top we find the gold-yellowed Sun of May. The coat of arms symbolizes the rising of Argentina, the unity of the provinces of Argentina, power and willingness to defend freedom.
Cockade	Cockade of Argentina	It was instituted by decree on February 18, 1812, by the First Triumvirate. The cockade was first used by the ladies of Buenos Aires during the events of the 1810 May Revolution. On February 18, 1812, the government decided to create the national cockade of the United Provinces of the Río de la Plata with light blue at its outer border and centre, and white between both. Belgrano then used the same colours to design the national flag.
Sun of May		The Sun of May is a representation of the Inca sun god Inti. The sun, called the Sun of May, is engraved on an 1828 eight escudo, the first Argentine coin, approved in 1813 by the Constituent Assembly. It features 32 rays, 16 undulated and 16 straight in alternation, and since 1978 it must be embroidered in the official ceremonial flag.
National anthem	"Himno Nacional Argentino" (Argentine National Anthem)	The Argentine National Anthem, adopted in 1813, was written by Vicente López y Planes with music by Blas Parera. It has been subsequently shortened to only three paragraphs, after omitting the lyrics' attacks against former occupant Spain. Performance of the anthem is mandatory during all official events, and Argentines in attendance are expected to stand up and sing it.
Motto	En unión y libertad (In unity and freedom)	It was set in the 1813 General Assembly, during the War of Independence of the United Provinces of the Río de la Plata from the Spanish Empire. It can be seen in all peso coins and banknotes currently in circulation.
Logo	Logo of Argentina	It came from the Contest for the Visual Identity of the Argentina Brand, which took place in 2006. Through the presidential decree 1372/2008, the logo representing Argentina abroad became official.
Father of the Fatherland	José de San Martín	
National colours	Sky blue #74acdf White #FFFFFF Gold #fcbf49 Blue (secondary) #0067c6	
National personification	Effigy of the Republic/Liberty/Progress/Fatherland	
National personification	Gaucho	
National tree	Ceibo	
National tree	Red Quebracho	
Floral emblem	Ceibo flower	
National animal/National bird	Hornero	
National gemstone	Rhodochrosite	
National sport	Pato	
National liquor	Wine	
National infusion	Mate	
National dish	Asado	
National dish	Locro	
Patron saint	Our Lady of Luján	
