= Rhodochrosite =

Mineral of manganese carbonate

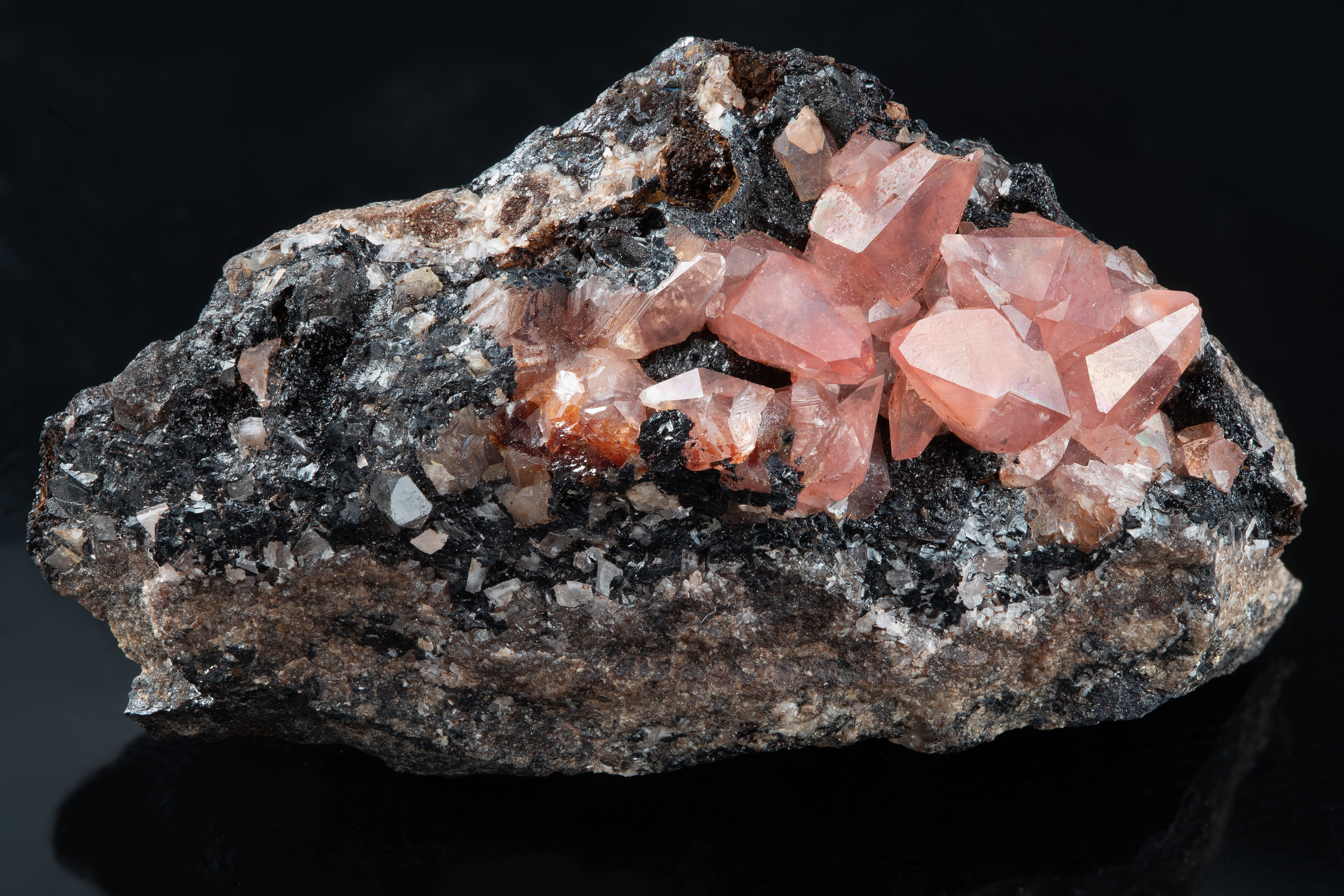

General
- Category: Carbonate minerals
- Formula: MnCO_{3}
- IMA symbol: Rds
- Strunz classification: 5.AB.05
- Crystal system: Trigonal
- Crystal class: Hexagonal scalenohedral (3̅m); H-M symbol: (3̅ 2/m)
- Space group: R3̅c
- Unit cell: a = 4.777, c = 15.67 [Å]; Z = 6

Identification
- Formula mass: 114.95 g/mol
- Color: Pink, rose, rose-red, red, cherry-red, yellow, yellowish grey, grey, cinnamon-brown, white, may be banded; colourless to pale rose in transmitted light.
- Crystal habit: Rhombohedral and scalenohedral crystals; also commonly bladed, columnar, stalactitic, botryoidal, granular or massive
- Twinning: On {101̅2} as contact and lamellar
- Cleavage: On {101̅1} perfect; parting on {101̅2}
- Fracture: Uneven, conchoidal
- Tenacity: Brittle
- Mohs scale hardness: 3.5–4
- Luster: Vitreous to pearly
- Streak: White
- Diaphaneity: Transparent to translucent
- Specific gravity: 3.7
- Optical properties: Uniaxial (−)
- Refractive index: n_{ω} = 1.814–1.816 n_{ε} = 1.596–1.598
- Birefringence: δ = 0.218
- Pleochroism: weak
- Ultraviolet fluorescence: None

Rhodochrosite is a manganese carbonate mineral with chemical composition MnCO_{3}. In its pure form (rare), it is typically a rose-red colour, but it can also be shades of pink to pale brown. It streaks white, and its Mohs hardness varies between 3.5 and 4.5. Its specific gravity is between 3.45 and 3.6. The crystal system of rhodochrosite is trigonal, with a structure and cleavage in the carbonate rhombohedral system. The carbonate ions (CO^{2−}_{3}) are arranged in a triangular planar configuration, and the manganese ions (Mn^{2+}) are surrounded by six oxygen ions in an octahedral arrangement. The MnO_{6} octahedra and CO_{3} triangles are linked together to form a three-dimensional structure. Crystal twinning is often present. It can be confused with the manganese silicate rhodonite, but is distinctly softer. Rhodochrosite is formed by the oxidation of manganese ore, and is found in South Africa, China, and the Americas. It is one of the national symbols of Argentina and the state of Colorado.

Rhodochrosite forms a complete solid solution series with iron carbonate (siderite). Calcium (as well as magnesium and zinc, to a limited extent) frequently substitutes for manganese in the structure, leading to lighter shades of red and pink, depending on the degree of substitution. This is the reason for the rose color of rhodochrosite.

== Occurrence and discovery ==
Rhodochrosite occurs as a hydrothermal vein mineral along with other manganese minerals in low temperature ore deposits as in the silver mines of Romania where it was first found. Banded rhodochrosite is mined in Capillitas, Argentina.

It was first described in 1813 in reference to a sample from Cavnic, Maramureș, present-day Romania. The name is derived from the combination of Greek words ροδόν (rodon, meaning rose) and χρωσις (chrosis, meaning coloring).

== Use ==
Rhodochrosite is mainly used as an ore of manganese, which is a key component of low-cost stainless steel formulations, many tool steels, and certain aluminium alloys. Quality banded specimens are often used for decorative stones and jewellery. Due to its softness and perfect cleavage it is rarely found faceted in jewellery and is also sought after by many collectors.

Manganese carbonate is extremely destructive to the amalgamation process historically used in the concentration of silver ores, and were often discarded on the mine dump.

== Culture ==
Stereo image
Left frame
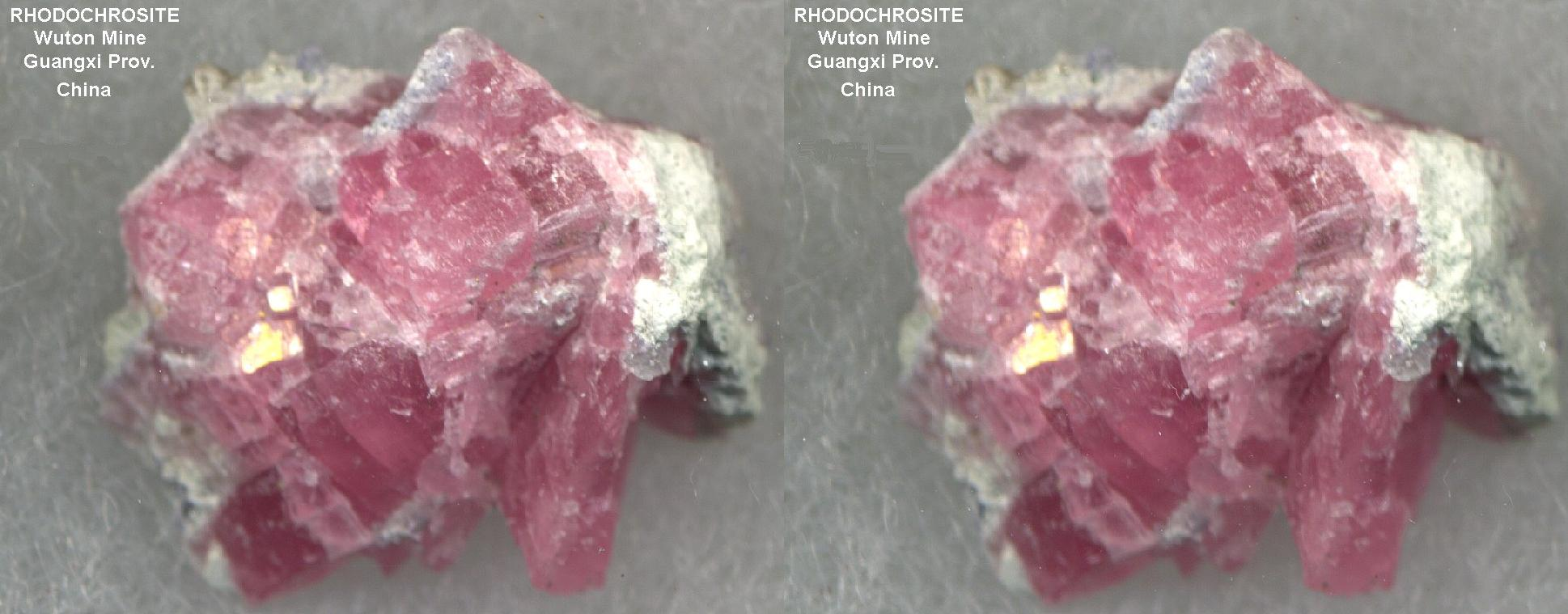
Right frame
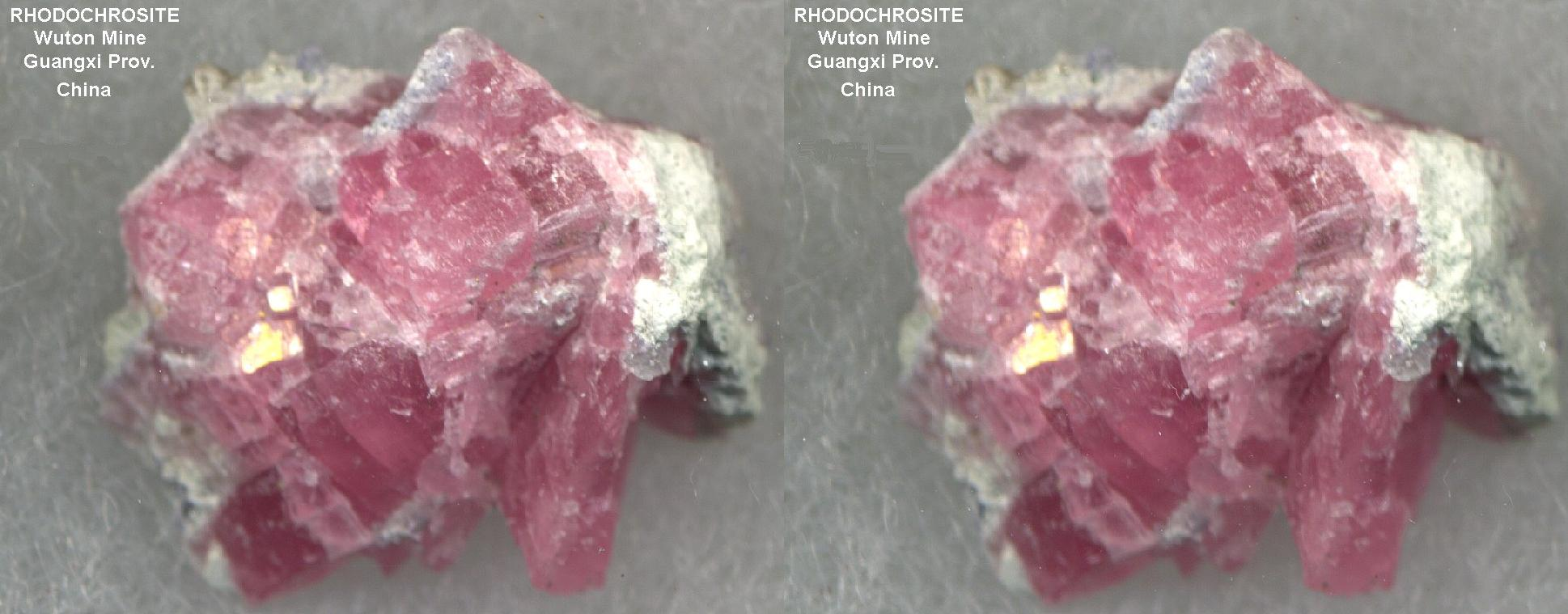
Parallel view
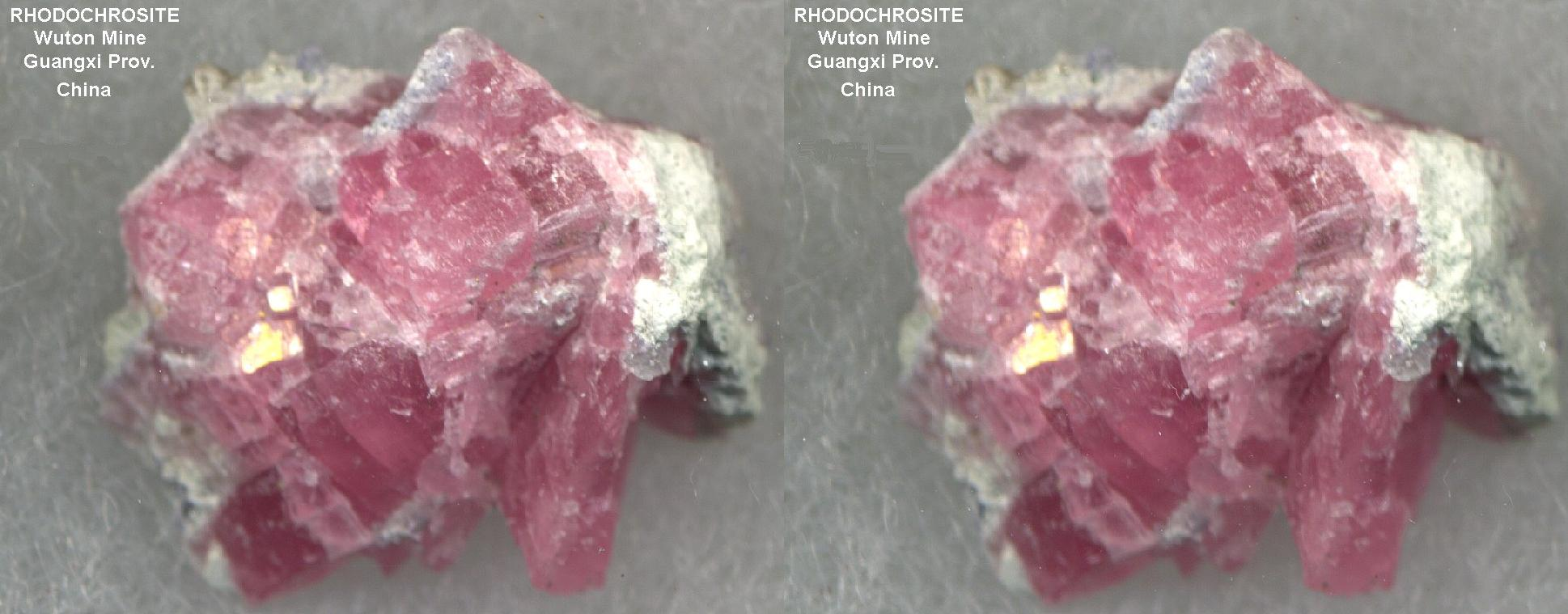
Cross-eye view
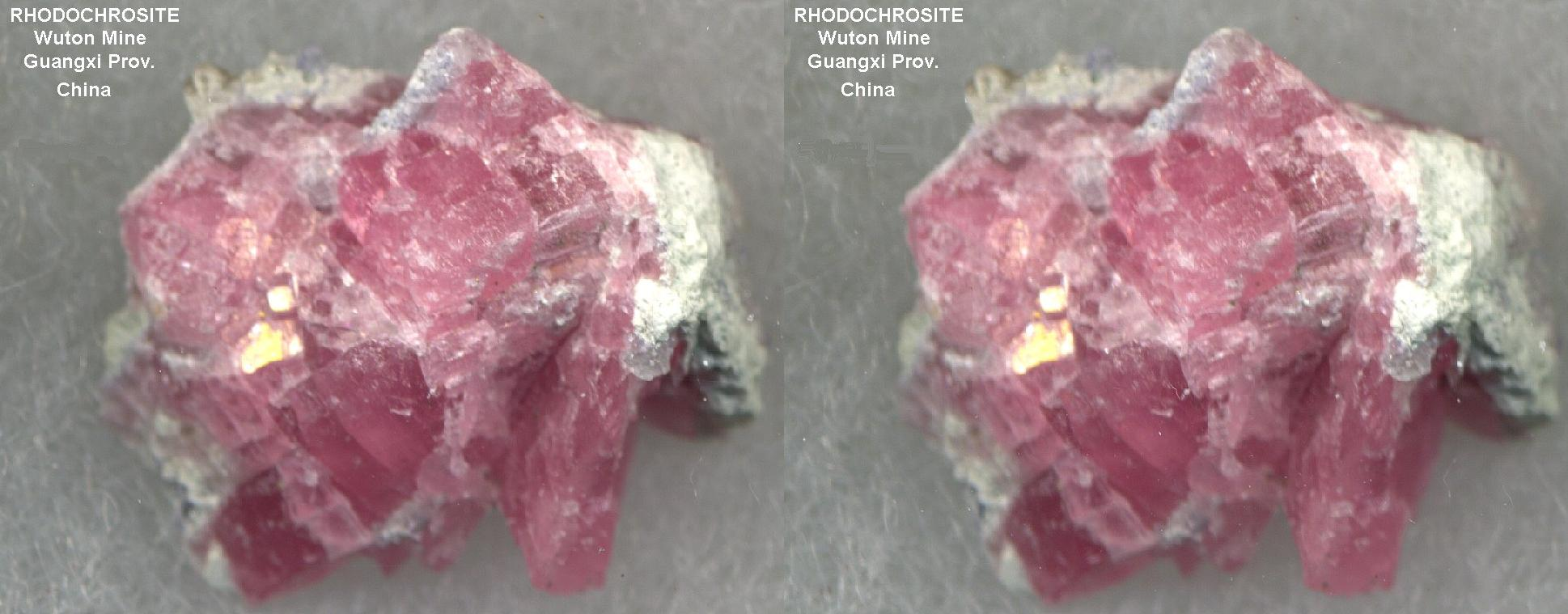

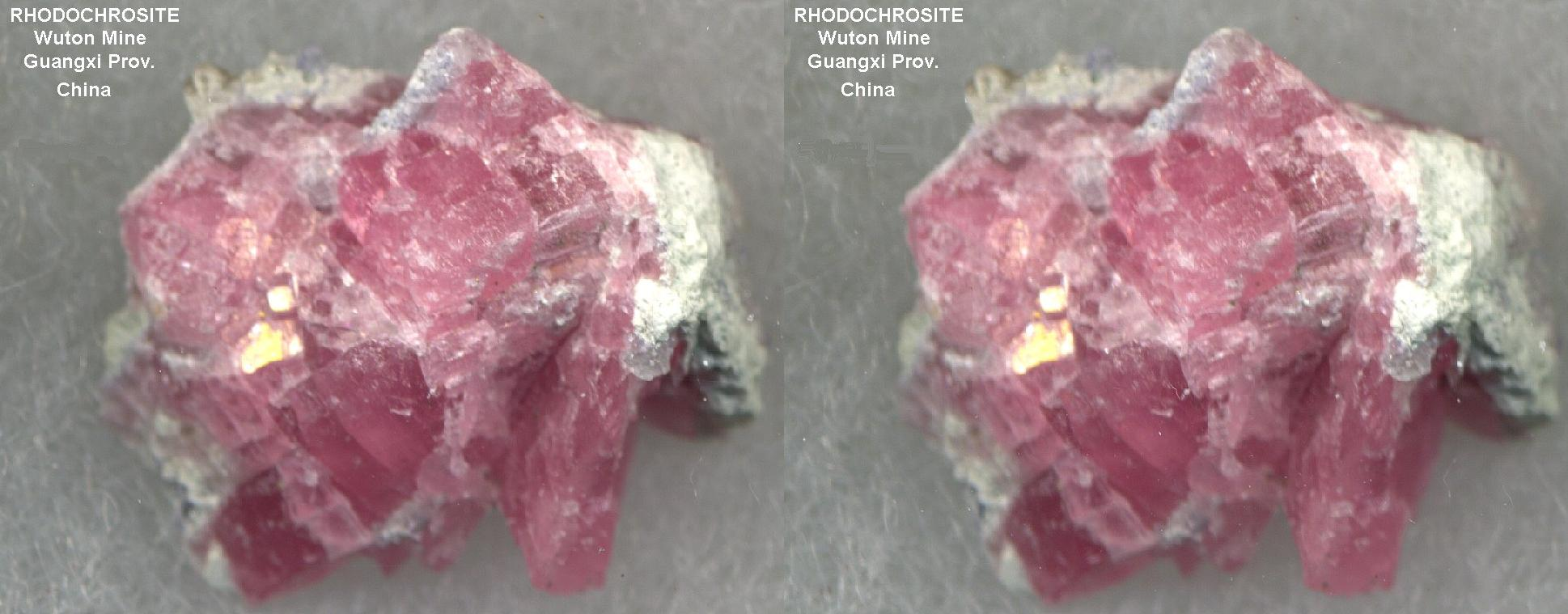
- Small Rhodochrosite specimen featured in a mineral kit, from Wuton mine, Guangxi, China.

Rhodochrosite is Argentina's "national gemstone". Colorado officially named rhodochrosite as its state mineral in 2002.

It is sometimes called "Rosa del Inca", "Inca Rose" or Rosinca.

== Gallery ==
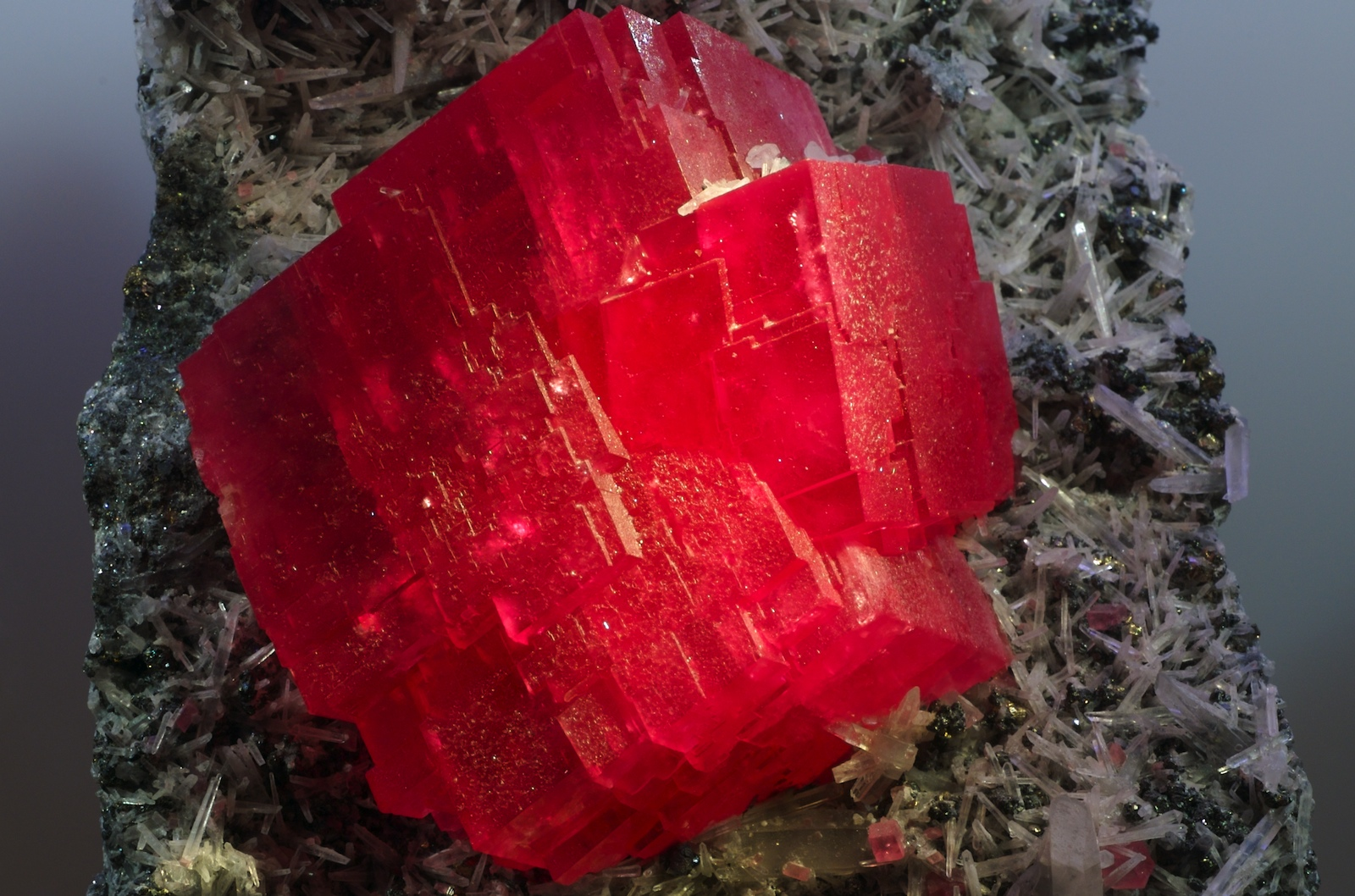
"The Searchlight," a large red rhodochrosite from Sweet Home Mine, Alma, Colorado, U.S.

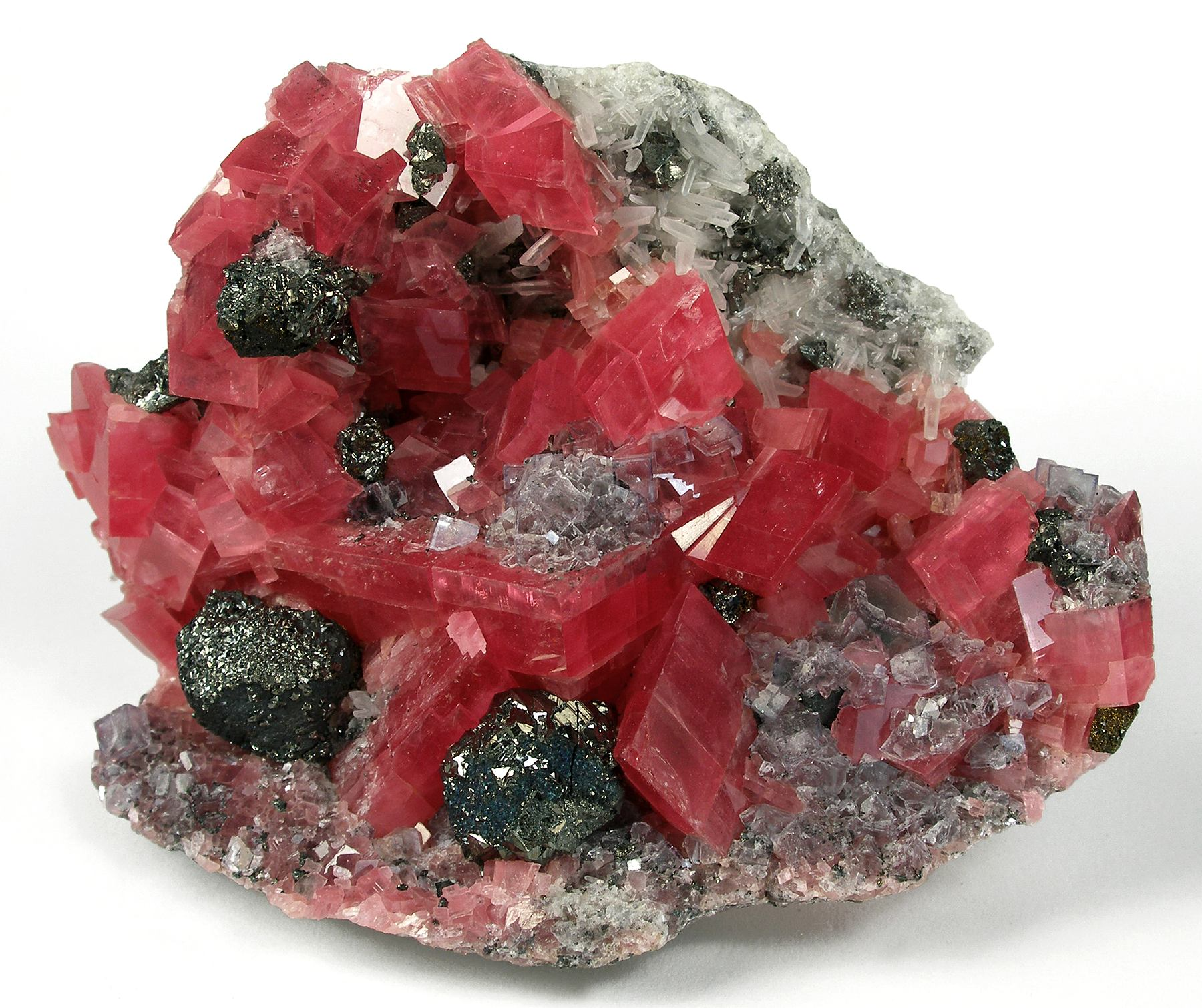
Rhodochrosite with fluorite, tetrahedrite and quartz.

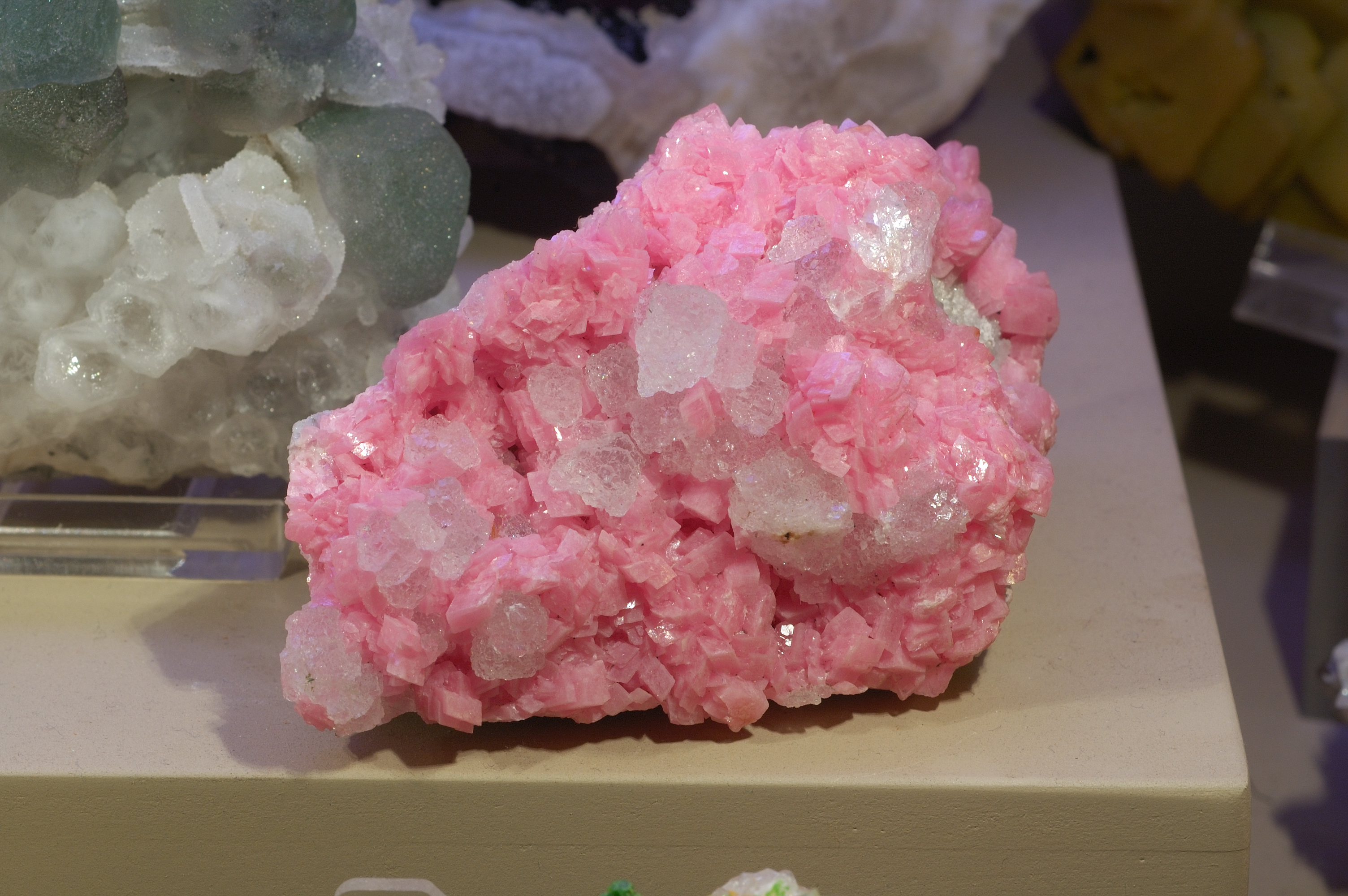
Rhodochrosite from Silverton, Colorado, U.S.

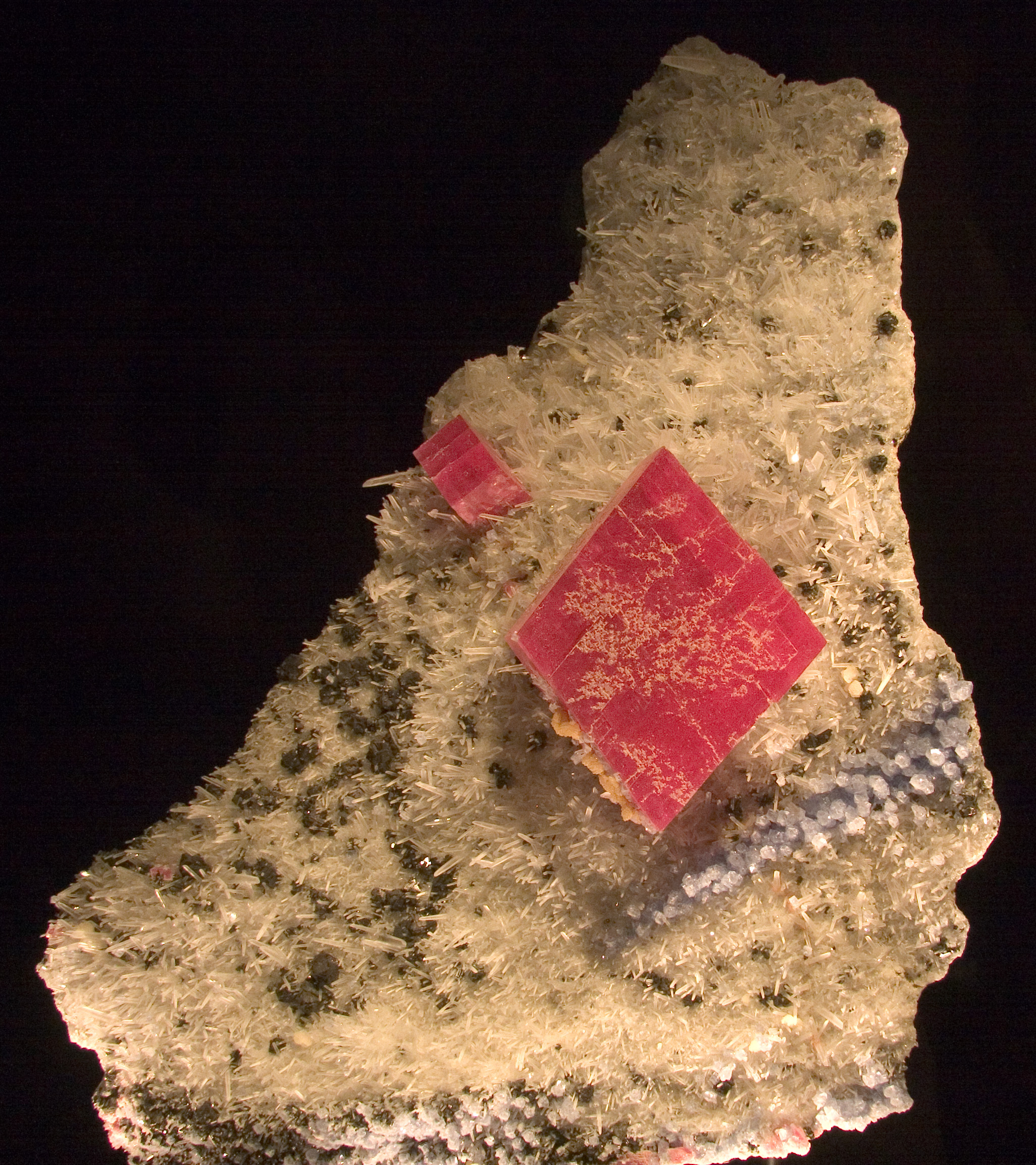
The Alma King is the largest known rhodochrosite crystal; it was found in the Sweet Home Mine near Alma, Colorado and donated to the Denver Museum of Nature and Science.

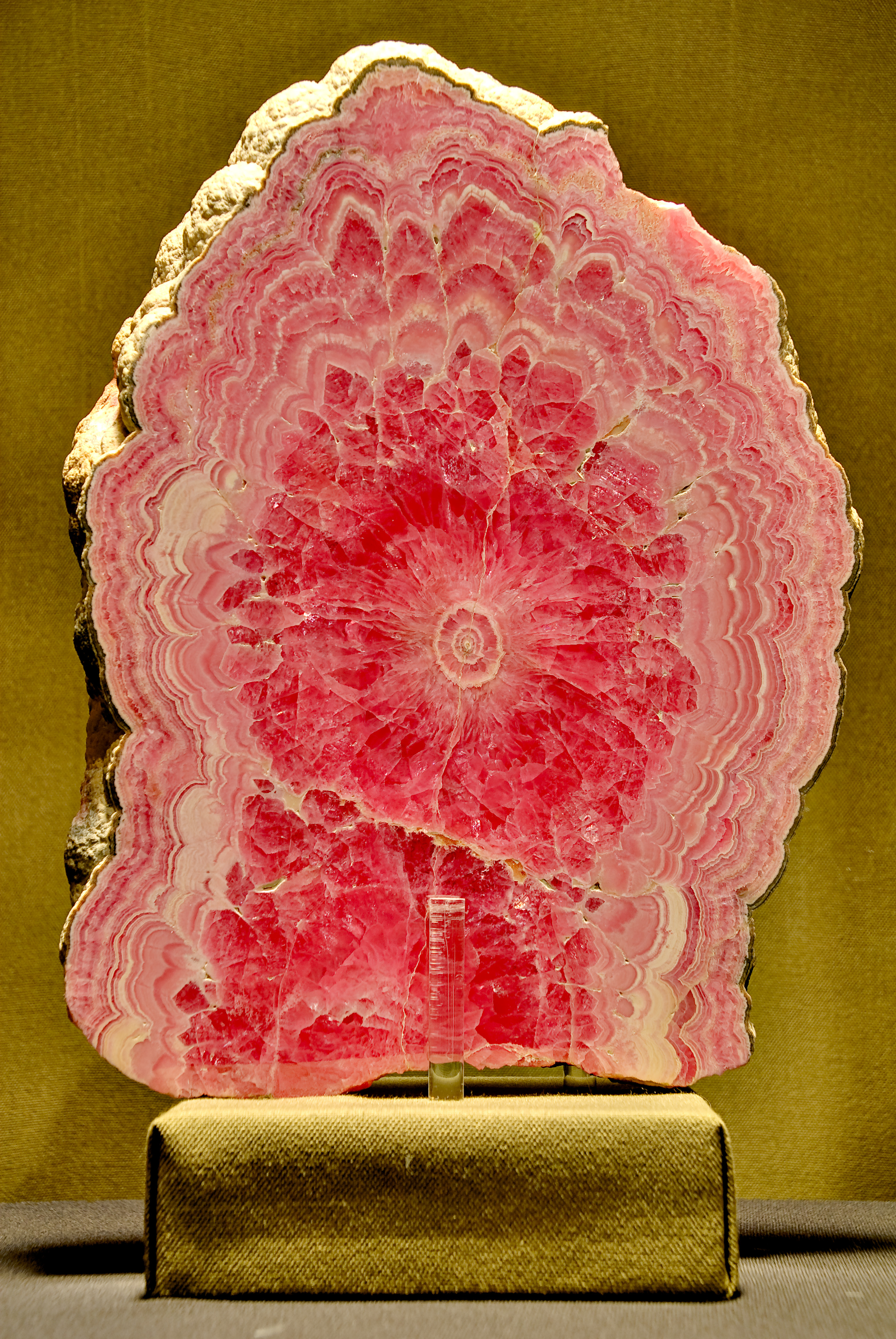
Exhibit in La Plata Museum, Argentina.

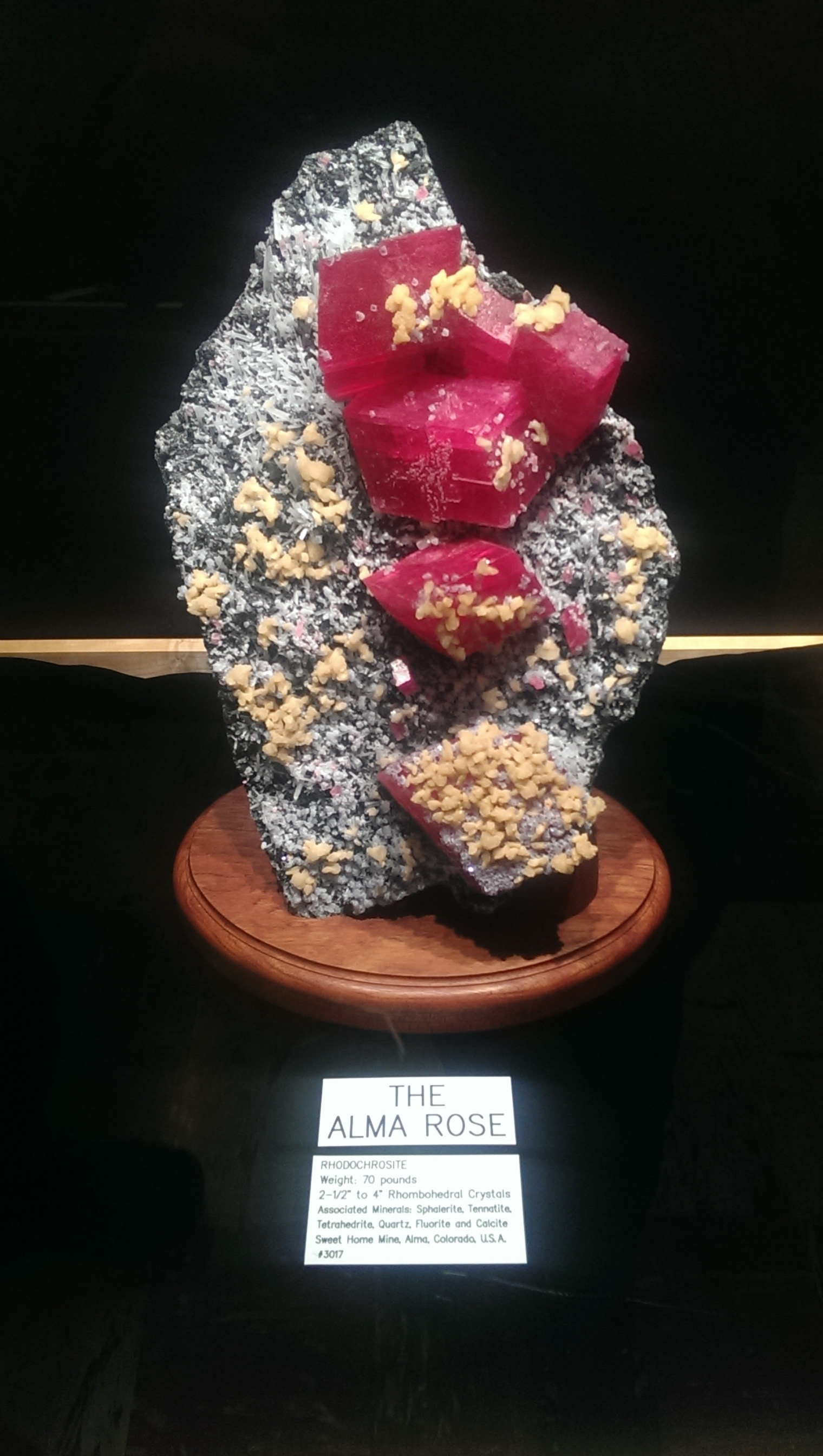
The Alma Rose specimen from the Sweet Home Mine. On display at the Rice Northwest Museum of Rocks and Minerals in Hillsboro, Oregon, U.S.

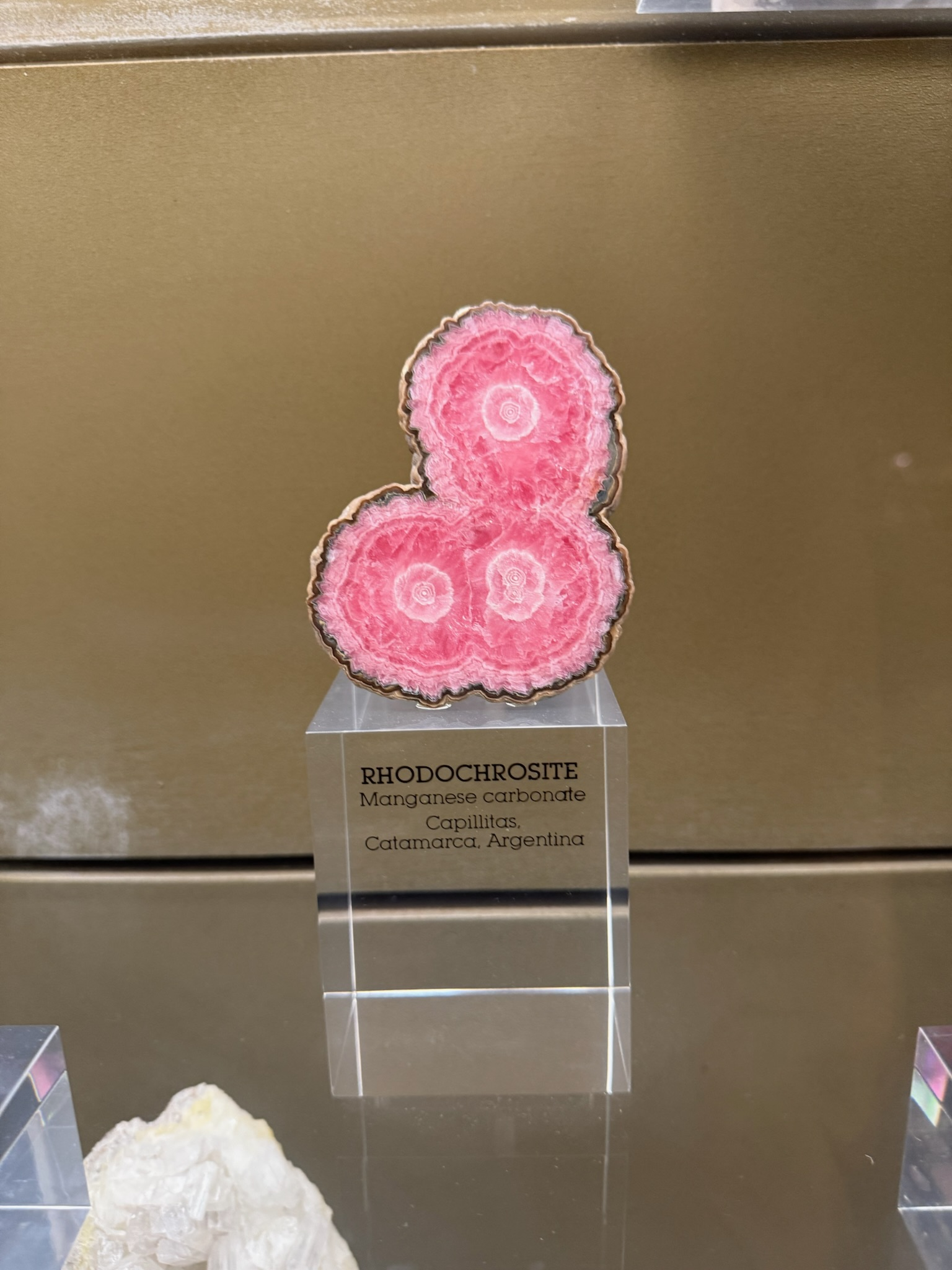
Rhodochrosite from Argentina

Rhodochrosite Wutong mine, China

== See also ==
- List of minerals
- Manganoan calcite
