= Classic Aircraft Aviation Museum =

Aviation museum in Hillsboro, Oregon

- Museum logo
- Established: 1998
- Location: Hillsboro, Oregon, United States
- Coordinates: 45.532628°N 122.951313°W
- Type: Aviation
- Founder: Roger Kelsay
- Director: Doug Donkel
- Public transit access: Hillsboro Airport/Fairplex station
- Website: www.classicaircraft.org

The Classic Aircraft Aviation Museum is an aviation museum located in Hillsboro in the U.S. state of Oregon. Started in 1998, one of the museums with about 5 aircraft is located at the Hillsboro Airport in the Portland metropolitan area. Aircraft at the museum are either maintained in flyable condition or are restored so that they can be flown once again. As of March 2010, there were 15 aircraft in the museum's collection within multiple locations between Hillsboro, Oregon, Corvallis, Oregon and Tillamook Oregon and Doug Donkel served as museum director.

== History ==
Roger Kelsay founded Premier Jets in 1984 as a charter flight company at the Hillsboro Airport. Over time, he acquired classic military aircraft, including a MiG-17F in 1995. The plane was built in 1958 and had been in the Polish Air Force. Kelsay then founded the Classic Aircraft Aviation Museum in 1998 and donated many of the planes in the museum's collection.

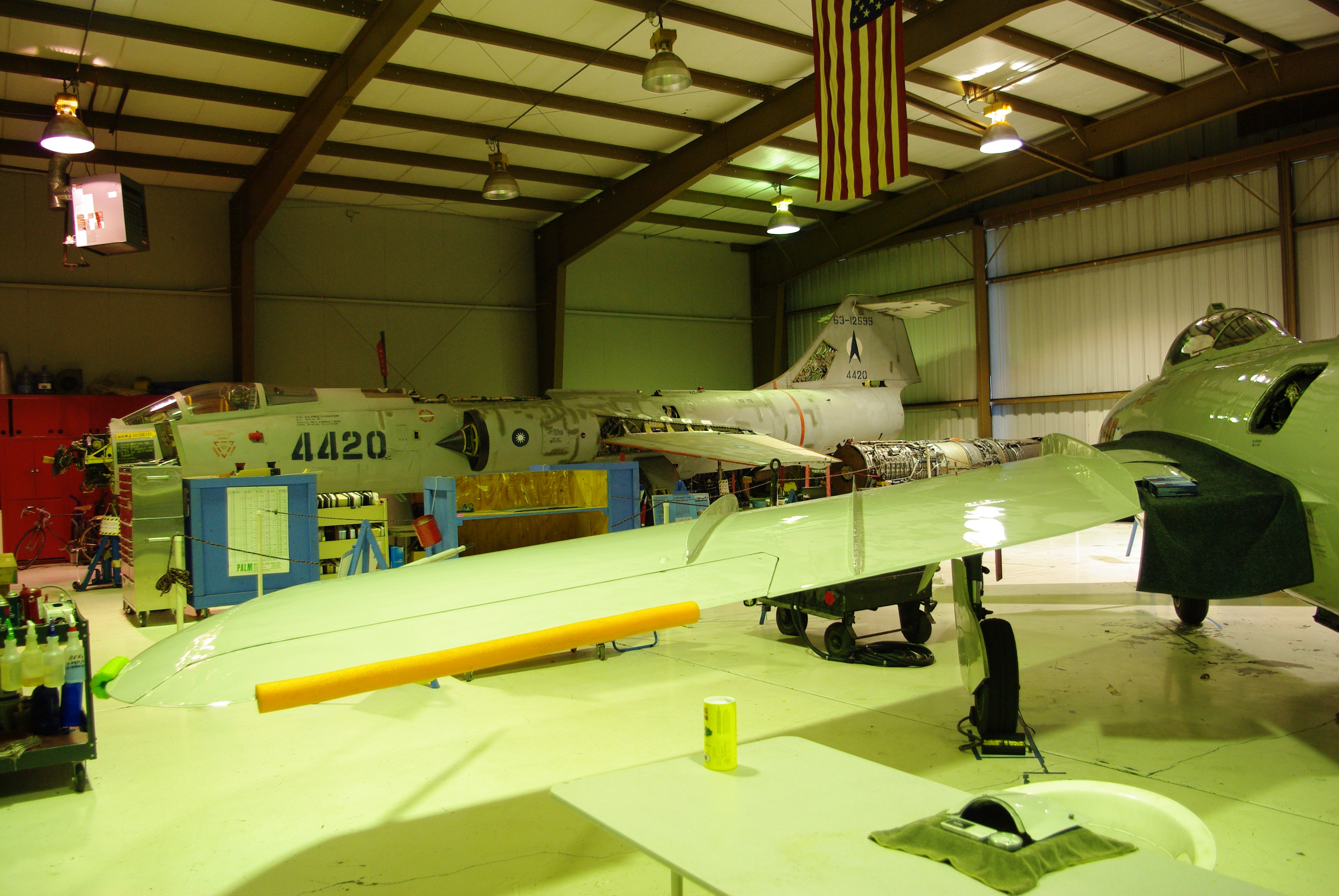
Inside the museum's hangar

The museum had a performance at the 2006 Oregon International Air Show that featured the former Polish Air Force MIG-17F and a former Royal Air Force (UK) BAC Jet Provost Mk.3A, with the museum participating in the 2007 show with the same aircraft. In January 2007, Classic Aircraft Aviation Museum purchased a MiG 21 from a Chevrolet dealership in Federal Way, Washington. The fighter had been displayed on the car dealer's sales lot, but the museum planned to restore the plane to flight worthy status.

Then in October of that year they received a F-104G from Taiwan's Feng Chia University. A Douglas C-47A was added to the museum's collection in 2009 when it was donated by a Southern Oregon man. That plane was built in 1942 and is the military version of the more famous DC-3. The museum's C-47A had previously been in the Royal Canadian Air Force and was later used as a freight hauler before a Roseburg, Oregon, collector acquired the still flyable aircraft.

Classic Aircraft Aviation Museum was again at the Hillsboro air show in 2010, this time with their Douglas A-26C Invader, MiG-17F, and F-86 Sabre performing in the show. In 2016, the museum lost its lease for one hangar, requiring the relocation of some of its collection. Some of the planes were sent to the Tillamook Air Museum and the Hillsboro Museums extension location at Corvallis Aero Services in Corvallis, Oregon.

== Collection and mission ==
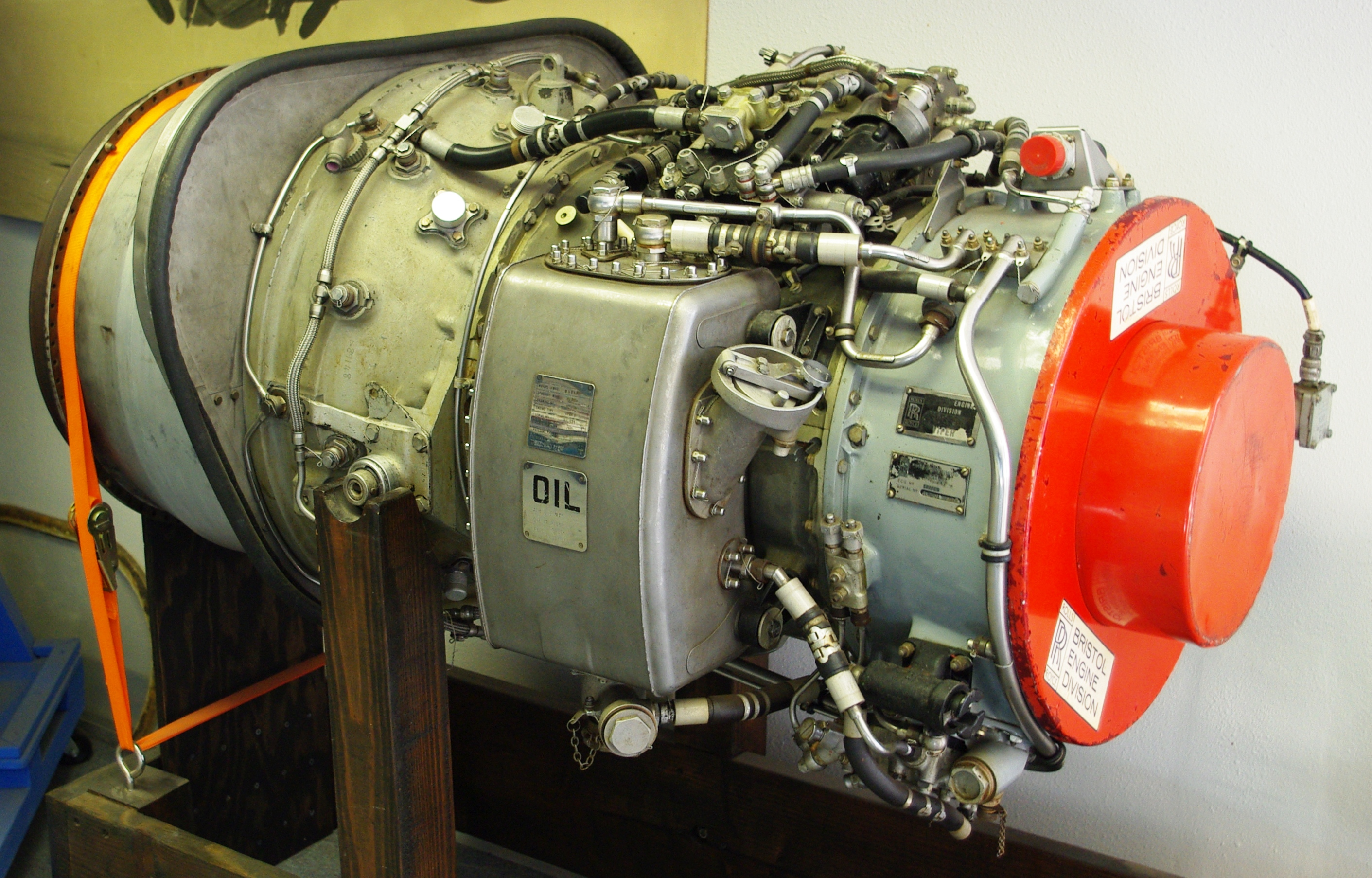
A jet engine on display at the museum

The hangar where the Hillsboro Museum is located in was once home to Premier Jets, which was owned by Roger Kelsay. Kelsay also owns most of the aircraft in the museum. The goal for all of the planes is that they once again are air worthy, and to that end, volunteers spend thousands of hours restoring the aircraft. The Hillsboro museum's specialty is restoring aircraft, though their collection also includes some aviation artifacts as well. This is part of their goal of educating the public through demonstrations of working aircraft. Other Museum pieces include engines, ground equipment, and ejection seats.

Besides restoring the aircraft, volunteers are also responsible for conducting the tours of the hangar and putting on exhibitions. The free museum in Hillsboro, OR is by appointment or drop by on Tuesdays between 8:30 am and 11:30 am (call ahead preferred You can stop by the Corvallis Aero Services in Corvallis OR for a tour M-F from 10am to 4pm (Appointment preferred) or at Tillamook Air Museum during their hours of operation. (Tillamook air museum is Permanently closed as of 5/21/2026)

=== Aircraft in the collection ===
- Two F-104s (location: One is in Hillsboro OR and One is in Corvallis OR)
- One Northrop F-5 (location: Hillsboro OR)
- Two Douglas A-26C Tankers, (location: Tillamook Aviation Museum, Tillamook OR)
- One Douglas C-47A - Sold
- One BAC Jet Provost (location: Tillamook Air Museum, Tillamook OR)
- One MiG 17F (location: Tillamook Air Museum, Tillamook OR)
- Two MiG 21s (location: One is in Corvallis OR, Other is in Klamath Falls OR)
- One CL-13 Mk.6 Sabre - Sold
- One Fouga CM-170 Magister (location: Hillsboro OR)
- One Hawker Hunter F Mk.51 (location: Hillsboro OR)

Aircraft in the museum come from as far away as Poland, Turkey, and Taiwan. Not all of the aircraft are located at the hangar in Hillsboro.

== See also ==
- List of aerospace museums
- Rice Northwest Museum of Rocks and Minerals
- Next Level Pinball Museum
- Five Oaks Museum
