= Sweet Home Mine =

Mine in Colorado, United States

Coordinates: 39.312767°N 106.118632°W

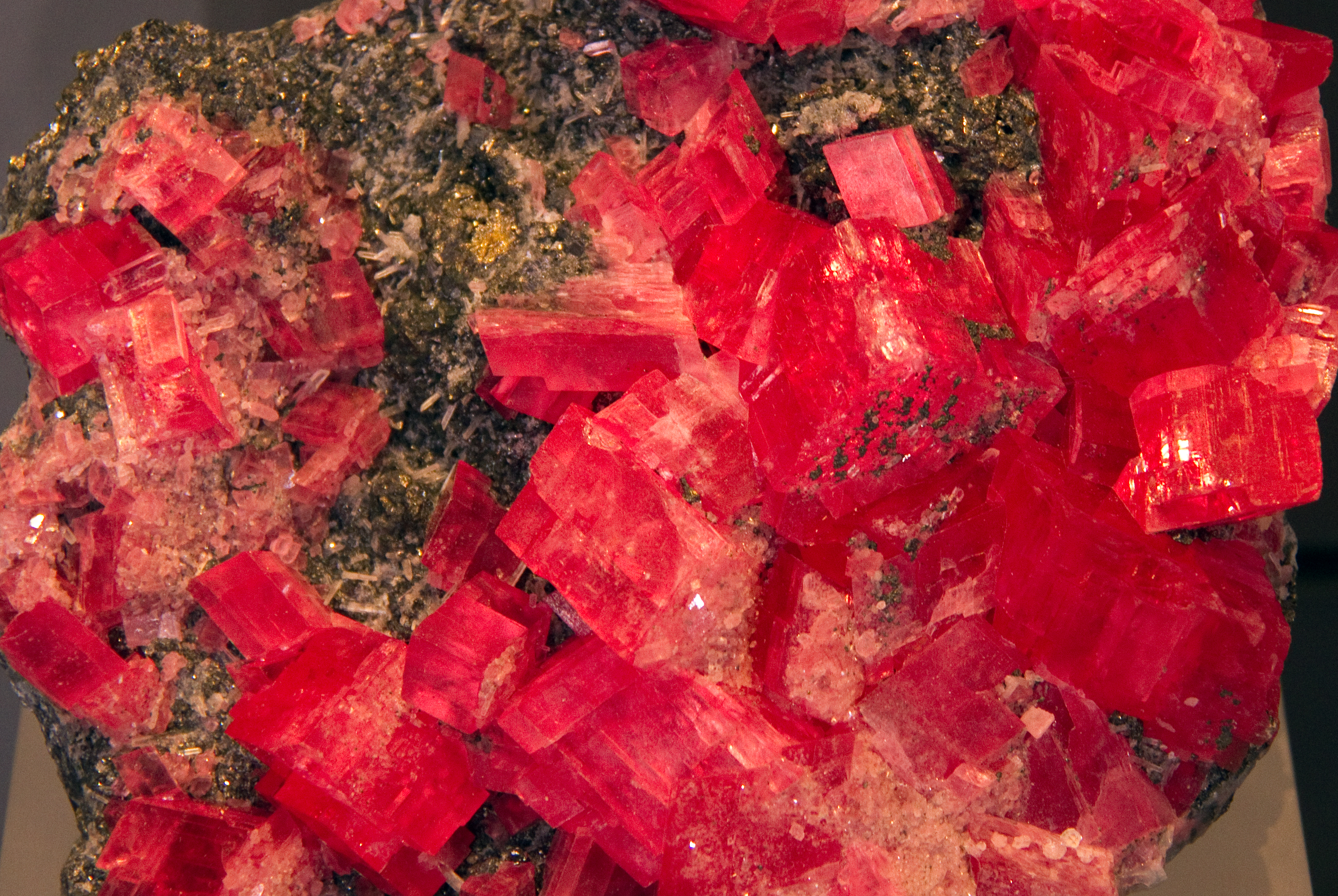
Sweet Home Rhodochrosite, Royal Ontario Museum

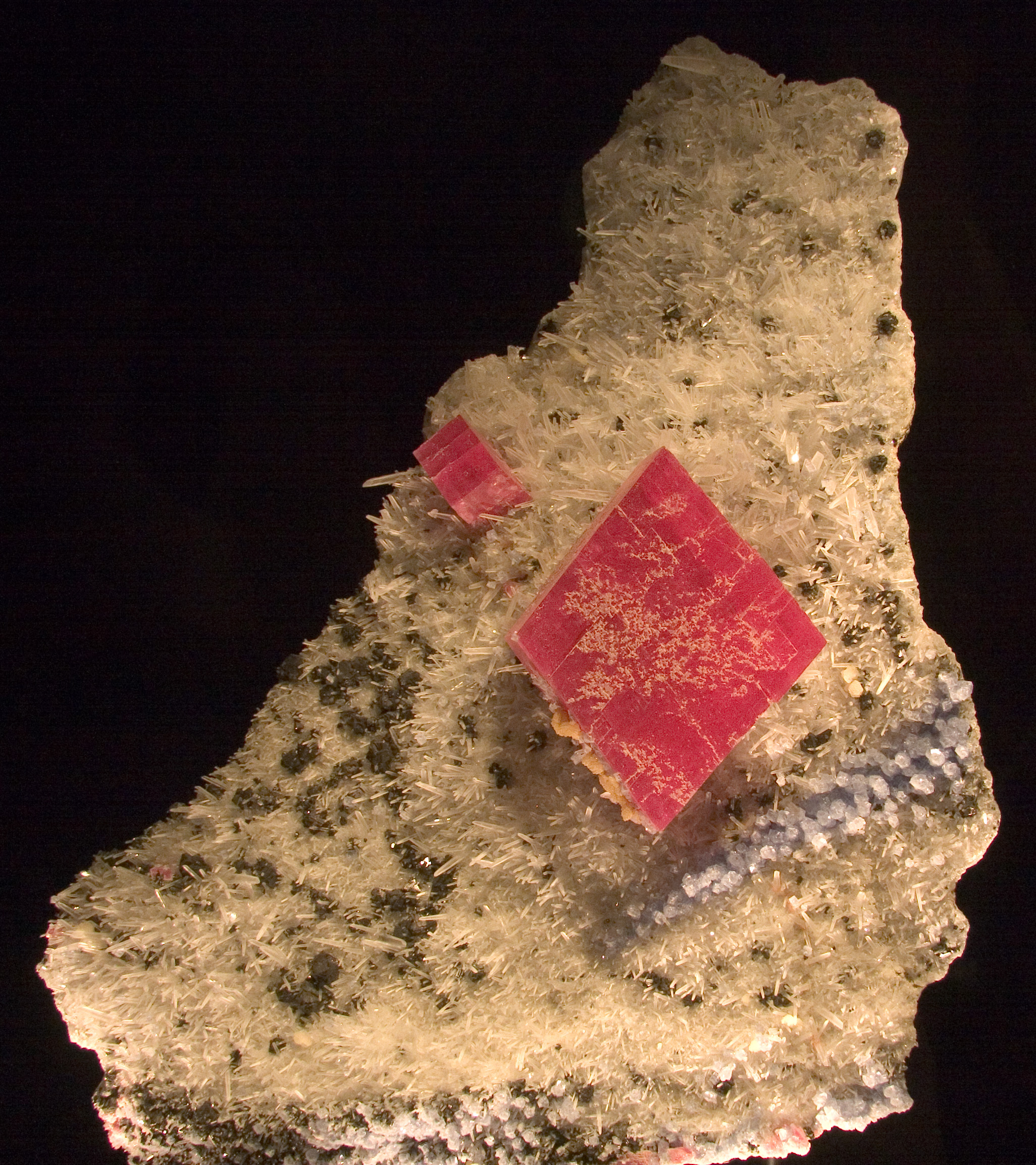
"Alma King", the largest known rhodochrosite crystal, from the Sweet Home Mine. It measures 14 cm x 16.5 cm.

Sweet Home Mine is a mine near Alma, Colorado, United States. It was founded in 1873 as a silver mine. It is best known as the source of the famous rhodochrosite crystals "Alma King", displayed at the Denver Museum of Nature and Science, and "Alma Rose", displayed at the Rice Northwest Museum of Rocks and Minerals in Oregon.

Specimens of Sweet Home Mine rhodochrosite are also displayed at the geology museum at the Colorado School of Mines, and in the Royal Ontario Museum, the Houston Museum of Natural Science, and in many other museums and hundreds of private collections.

== See also ==
- Orphan Boy mine
