= Rice Northwest Museum of Rocks and Minerals =

Historic house in Oregon, United States

- Established: 1996
- Location: Hillsboro, Oregon, U.S.
- Coordinates: 45.5744°N 122.9486°W
- Type: Earth sciences
- Visitors: approx. 25,000 (2009)
- Director: Kimberly Vagner
- Curator: Angela Piller
- Website: ricenorthwestmuseum.org

The Rice Northwest Museum of Rocks and Minerals is a non-profit museum in Hillsboro, Oregon, United States. Located just north of the Sunset Highway on the northern edge of Hillsboro, the earth science museum is in the Portland metropolitan area. Opened in 1997, the museum's collections date to the 1930s with the museum housed in a home built to display the rock and mineral collections of the museum founders. The ranch-style home is listed on the National Register of Historic Places, the first of its kind listed in Oregon. In 2015 the museum became a Smithsonian Affiliate museum.

The museum sits on 23 wooded acres (9.3 ha), with the main building containing 7,500 square feet (700 m^{2}) of space. Collections include petrified wood, various fossils, fluorescent minerals, meteorites, zeolites, and a variety of other minerals. With more than 20,000 specimens, the museum is the largest of its kind in the Pacific Northwest. The facility has around 25,000 visitors each year.

== History ==
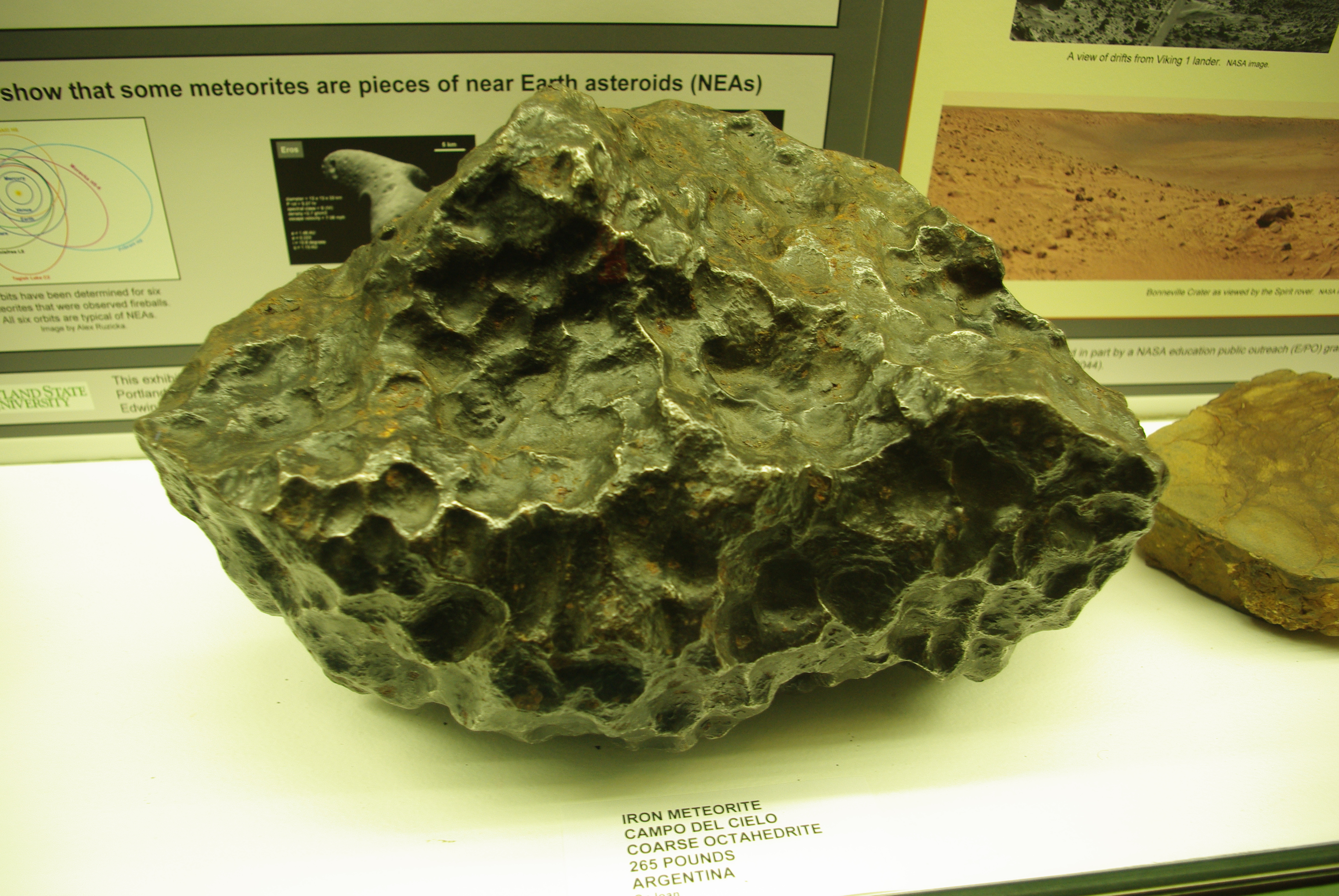
Meteorite from the Campo del Cielo field in Argentina

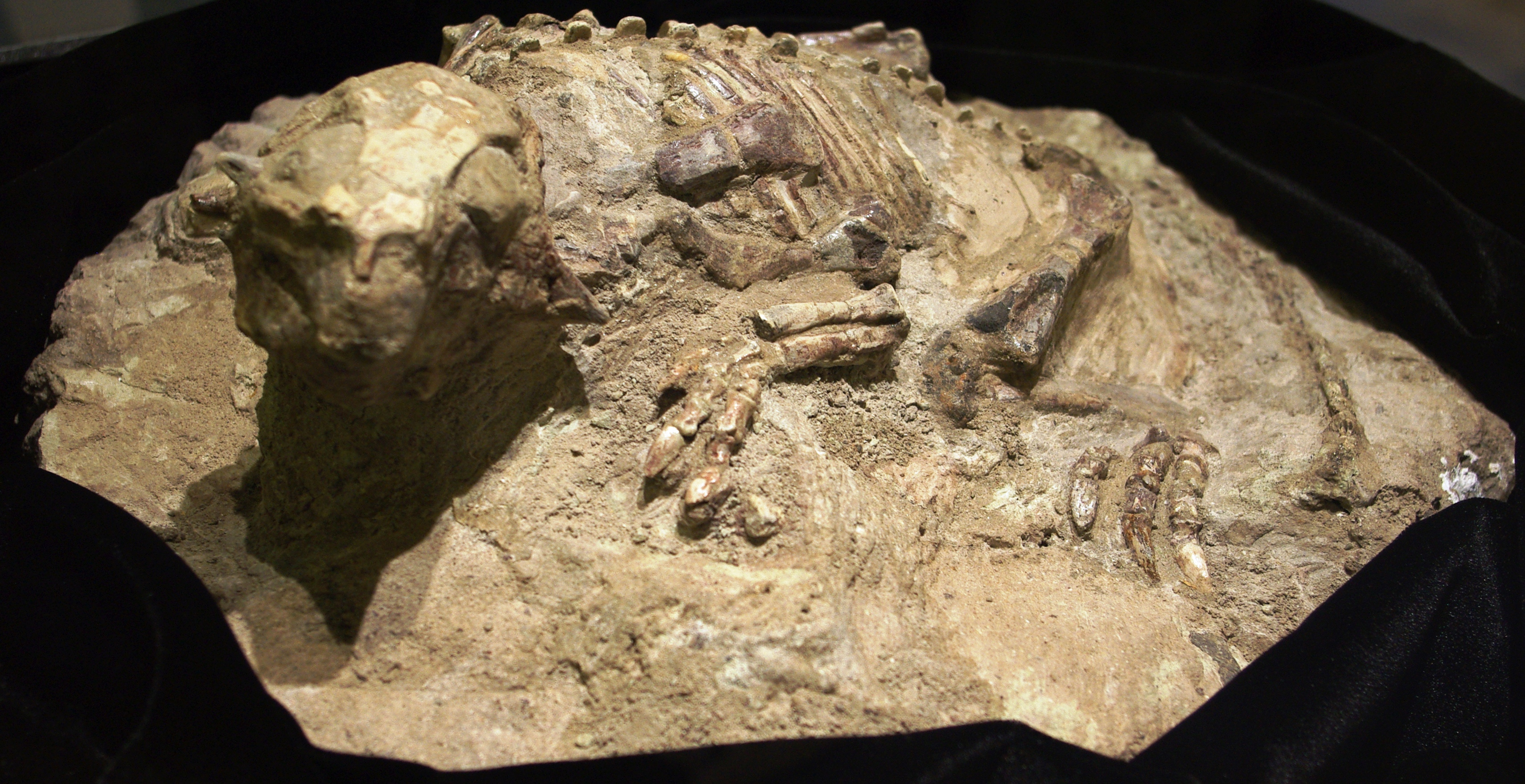
Psittacosaurus fossil

Richard L. Rice married Helen Hart in 1932 and the couple began rock collecting in 1938 after finding agates along the Oregon Coast. In 1952 the Rices built a new home north of Hillsboro on 30 acres (12 hectares) that would later house the museum. The Rices founded a museum in 1953 to display their collections. Their collections won them the Woodruff Trophy twice (1958 and 1961) and this award was permanently awarded to Richard and Helen in 1961. Helen served as president of the American Federation of Mineralogical Societies from 1959 to 1960.

In 1996 the Rices established the non-profit museum. Richard and Helen Rice both died in 1997 with the home passing to the non-profit museum as part of their estate. In 1997 the Rice Northwest Museum of Rocks and Minerals officially opened. In June 2000, 94 pieces from the F. John Barlow collection of crystallized gold were added to the museum. The facility opened an exhibit in 2001 dedicated to the lapidary arts, and by that time the museum had grown to more than 4,000 items.

The museum opened a new gallery in January 2003 to feature petrified wood. Rudy W. Tschernich was named curator in June 2003, replacing Sharleen Harvey. In 2004 the Cascadia Meteorite Laboratory at Portland State University loaned the museum 52 meteorites in an exhibit funded by NASA. Attendance had grown to around 15,000 in 2004.

In 2005 the North America Research Group unearthed the fossilized remains of a thalattosuchian crocodile from the Jurassic period in Central Oregon. The museum plans on displaying these fossils after they are studied. Later in 2005, the 1,800-square-foot (170 m^{2}) Northwest Minerals Gallery opened in a former storeroom at the museum after renovations totaling $150,000.

By 2007 the museum received 25,000 visitors each year, mainly from school groups. In August 2008 the museum opened a retail gift shop in The Streets of Tanasbourne shopping center, and closed it in December 2009 due to the economic recession. This satellite gift shop was to be a temporary endeavor, and was designed in part to help drive traffic to the museum. By 2010 the museum's collections had grown to more than 20,000 specimens, and still had about 25,000 visitors annually, with about 18,000 coming from school field trips. Tschernich stepped down as curator in 2011, with Lara O'Dwyer-Brown taking over the position in 2012. Brown left in 2014, with Julian Gray hired as executive director and Leslie Moclock as curator in May 2014. Leslie Moclock left the museum in 2018, and Julian Gray resigned to take over the curator position. Garret Romaine was named the executive director on an interim basis pending the hire of a new director, scheduled for 2020. Aurore Giguet took over as the executive director with the museum in 2020. Kimberly Vagner took over as executive director with the museum in 2022.

The museum's collection of gold items was stolen by a robber on December 24, 2023.

== Collections ==
Collections at the museum

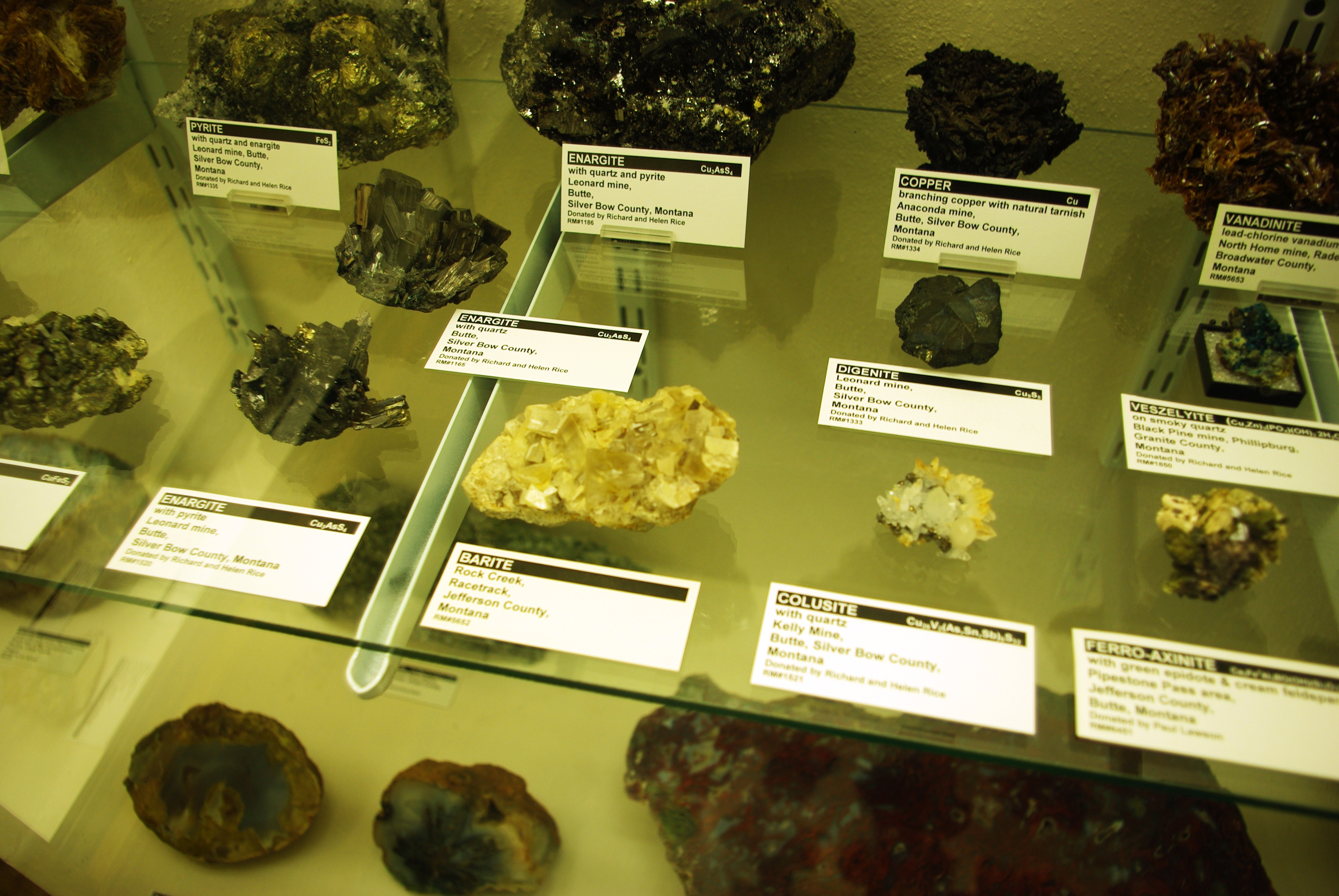
Specimens in the Northwest Gallery

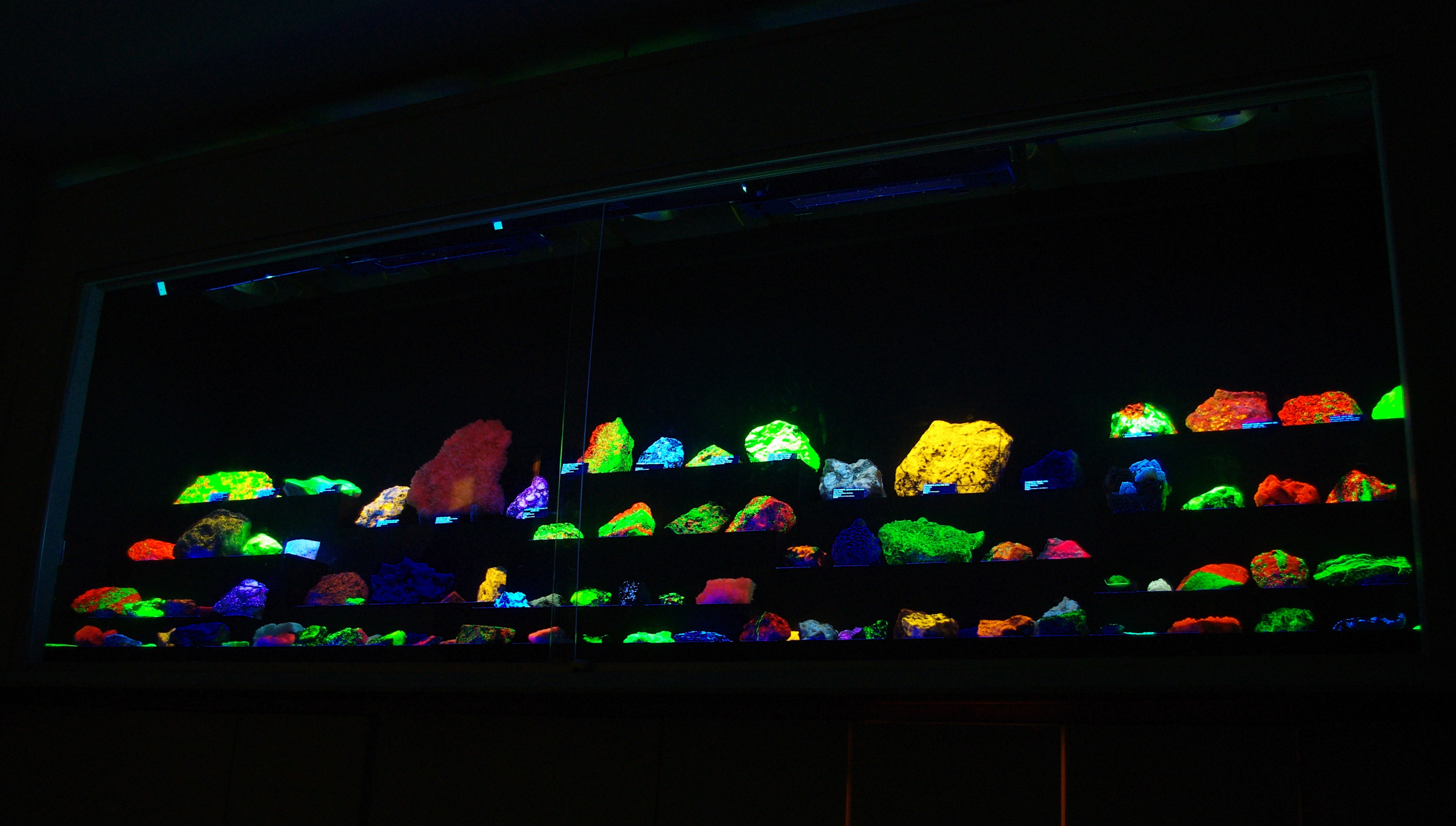
The Rainbow Gallery

The museum is the largest of its kind in the Pacific Northwest with more than 20,000 items. The specimens come from around the world, many personally unearthed by the Rices. Bill Dameron of The Mineralogical Record named the museum as having the best mineral specimens in the Pacific Northwest. The collections include gemstones, minerals, fossils, meteorites, and some artifacts.

Gemstones include rubies, diamonds, rhodochrosite, opal, emerald, and amethyst among others. Fossils include shark teeth, coprolites, or fossilized dung, petrified wood, dinosaur eggs, trilobites, and a baby dinosaur of the genus Psittacosaurus. Around 1,000 of the specimens at the museum are only viewable using a microscope.

One gallery, the Rainbow Gallery, is designed to showcase rocks and minerals that have phosphorescent or fluorescent elements that allow them to glow in the dark. An automated system uses a lighting cycle that includes ultraviolet lights to energize the rocks. A large portion of the petrified wood comes from the collection of Dennis and Mary Murphy. Their collection, which is in excess of 450 items and includes a log of white oak weighing 1,200 pounds (540 kg), was combined with the Rice Museum's existing pieces. The log is from Eastern Oregon and is estimated to have lived more than 25 million years ago. The petrified wood specimens come from Oregon, Washington, and as far away as Argentina and Australia. Other fossils include those of cycads, palms, and ferns.

The main rhodochrosite attraction is the "Alma Rose" from the Sweet Home Mine in Colorado. The Alma Rose includes crystals measuring up to 9.5 cm in length along with quartz and calcite highlights. The Rices once owned the complementary "Alma King" rhodochrosite from the same mine, but sold the piece to the Coors Brewing Company, who then donated it to the Denver Natural History Museum. The two stones had been purchased by the couple for US$800,000. Other rhodochrosite specimens include those from mines in Arizona. The museum also has a collection of 107 gold pieces from the F. John Barlow collection featuring items such as a 42 troy ounces (1.3 kg) leaf and pieces mined from the Ace of Diamonds mine in Liberty, Washington. One of the museum's pieces, a sperrylite from Russia, is considered one of the finest in the world.

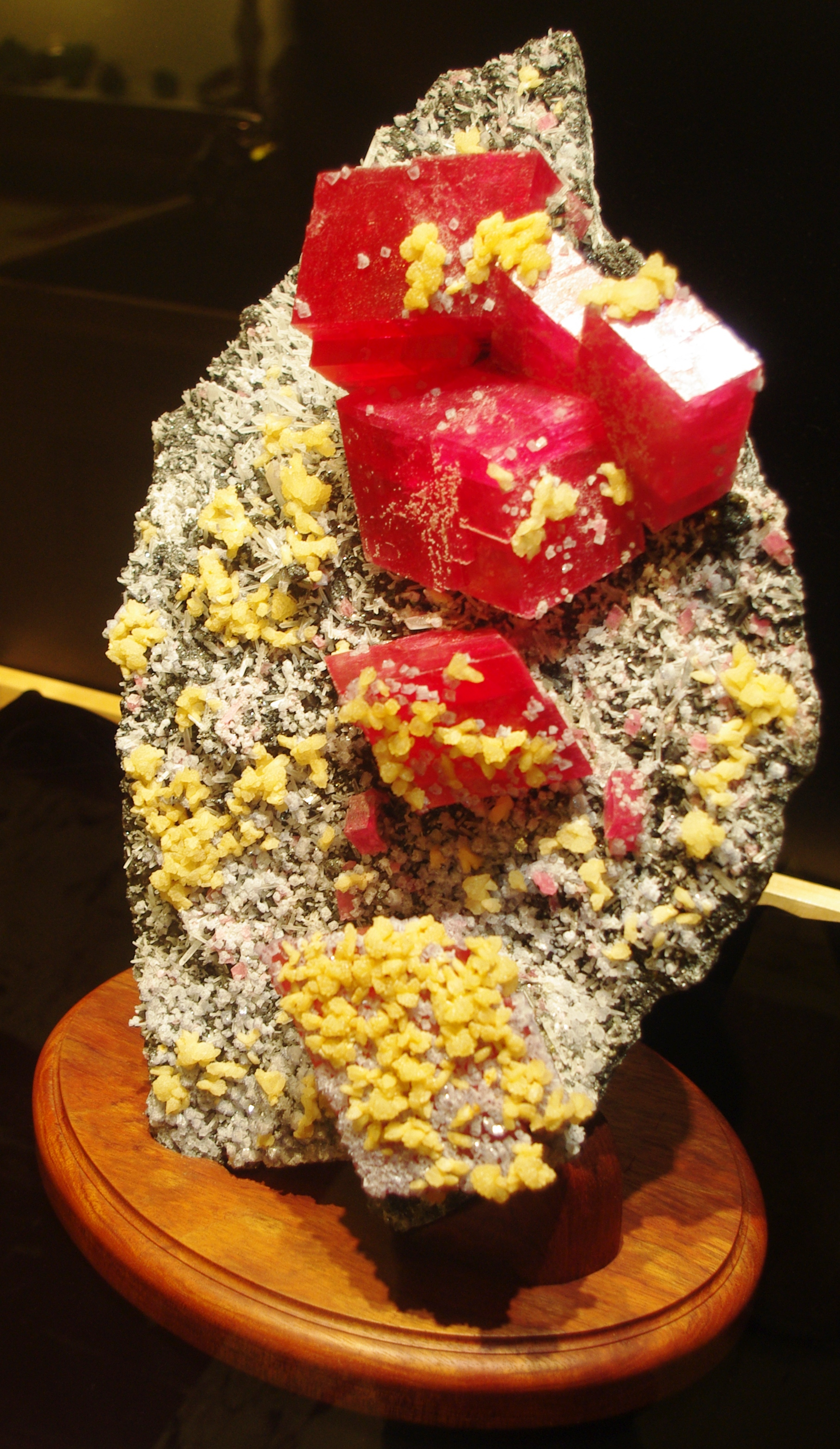
The "Alma Rose" rhodochrosite

Individual items on display include coprolite from Mongolia, a 500-pound (230 kg) piece of the lightweight volcanic rock pumice, obsidian and basalt. One specimen on display is a 30 centimetres (12 in) wide plate with clear quartz crystals, epidote crystals measuring as large as 10 cm and translucent calcite scalenohedrons, and comes from Green Monster Mountain on Alaska's Prince of Wales Island. The collection includes a cycad fossil dating from the Jurassic era that weighs 500 pounds (230 kg). One meteorite is the Gibeon meteorite which weighs 210 pounds (95 kg) and came from the African nation of Namibia. The world's largest known opal-filled thunderegg, weighing 1.75 tons (1600 kg), is housed at the museum. The thunderegg is Oregon's state rock. Other items include azurite, Oregon sunstone, amber, copper crystals, zeolites, morganite, and agate among others.

== Programs ==
The Rice Museum offers a variety of public programs. It once hosted an annual summer festival with events such as thunderegg cutting and demonstrations of gold panning. The facility has hosted the Northwest Fossil Fest. The museum also offers tours for school groups and other community groups. These events will resume if staffing and funding increase.

== Facilities ==
- Richard and Helen Rice House
- U.S. National Register of Historic Places
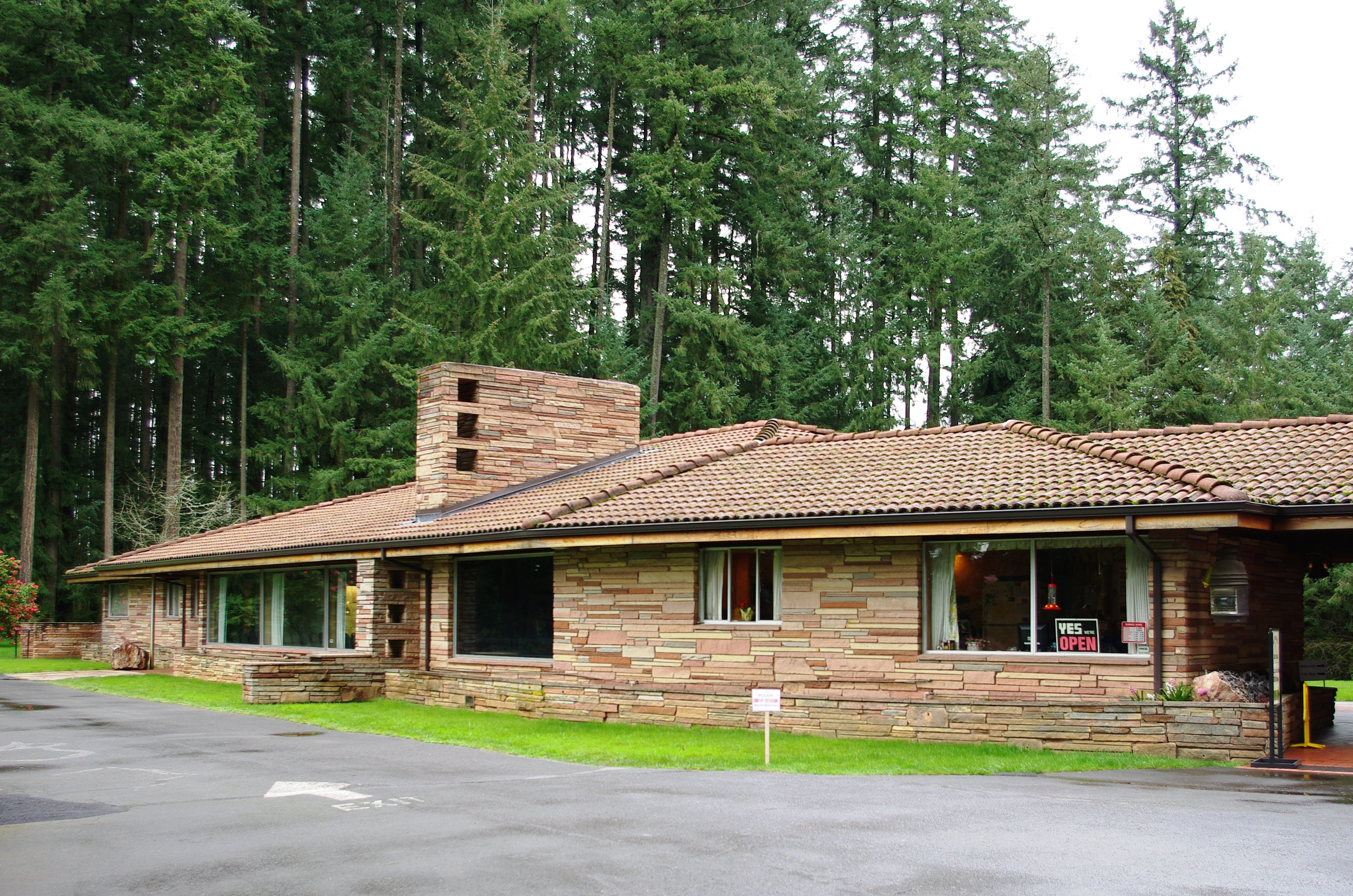
- Front of the home in 2010
- Coordinates: 45°34′28″N 122°56′55″W
- Built: 1952
- Architect: William F. Wayman
- Architectural style: Ranch
- NRHP reference No.: 06001096
- Added to NRHP: November 29, 2006

The museum and grounds are located on the north side of the Sunset Highway west of Portland between the Helvetia Road and Jackson School Road exits. Situated on 23 acres (9.3 ha) of mostly forested land, the museum is housed in the historic Richard and Helen Rice House, built as a single family residence. Completed in 1952, the home was built of Arizona flagstone on the exterior and wood native to Oregon, including curly maple and myrtlewood.

William F. Wayman designed the structure with Victor Batchelar building the home, while Charles F. Walters designed the grounds. All the wood was logged by Richard Rice, who made his living as a logging contractor. He also milled the wood. The home was designed to allow the basement to serve as a museum for the Rices' collections.

The structure contains three sandstone fireplaces, and the countertops are finished with hand-painted tiles from Mexico. Myrtlewood is used inside as trim and for doors. Bedroom closets were constructed with drawers, shelves, and ironing boards built-in. Inside the two-level building are amenities such as dumbwaiters and a sewing room. On the outside raked cedar was used on the eaves of the low-pitched roof-line building. The exterior sandstone is tan, rose, and blue in color.

The 7,500 square feet (700 m^{2}) home with a 3,300 square feet (310 m^{2}) basement cost $185,000 to build. Flooring in the museum was replaced in 2021 after a detrimental flood. The original blue linoleum in the basement that features the museum's logo of a shovel and a pick were preserved thanks to generous volunteer work and donations. The ranch style home was the first ranch home listed on the National Register of Historic Places in Oregon.

In addition to the house, which has a full basement, the museum uses a separate building as a gallery. That building, the Northwest Gallery, was formerly used for storage and as a shop, but looks similar to the Rice House. This gallery focuses on items from Oregon, Idaho, and Washington, and includes collections of agates, thundereggs, zeolites, and placer gold, among others. Before opening to the public in 1997 an elevator was added to the home.

The museum includes a Community Room, Resource Library, Fossil Gallery, Rainbow Gallery, Special Exhibits, Education Room, Petrified Wood Gallery, Main Gallery, and Pacific Northwest Gallery. There is also a gift shop, while the outside grounds include a walk that features sandstone, columns of basalt, a 1,200 pounds (540 kg) rock made of pumice, and the Rock Pile activity in which visitors are invited to take a rock home.

== See also ==
- Classic Aircraft Aviation Museum
- Next Level Pinball Museum
- Five Oaks Museum
