= Next Level Pinball Museum =

Arcade in Hillsboro, Oregon, U.S.

- Established: 2017
- Location: Hillsboro, Oregon, U.S.
- Coordinates: 45.5357°N 122.956°W
- Type: Pinball and arcade games
- Website: nextlevelpinballmuseum.com

The Next Level Pinball Museum is located in Hillsboro, Oregon, United States. It opened in 2017, has over 690 pinball and arcade machines, and is 27,000 square feet. In March 2024, it expanded by adding 7,000 square feet (650 m^{2}) of space and 150 games. Located near the Hillsboro Airport, machines in the collection come from collector Fred Carlson and his family, and the museum also displays over 3,000 of his items from his lunchbox collection. Visitors do not use quarters to play, but instead the machines are set to free play.

== See also ==
- Classic Aircraft Aviation Museum
- Five Oaks Museum
- Rice Northwest Museum of Rocks and Minerals
