= Logo of Argentina =

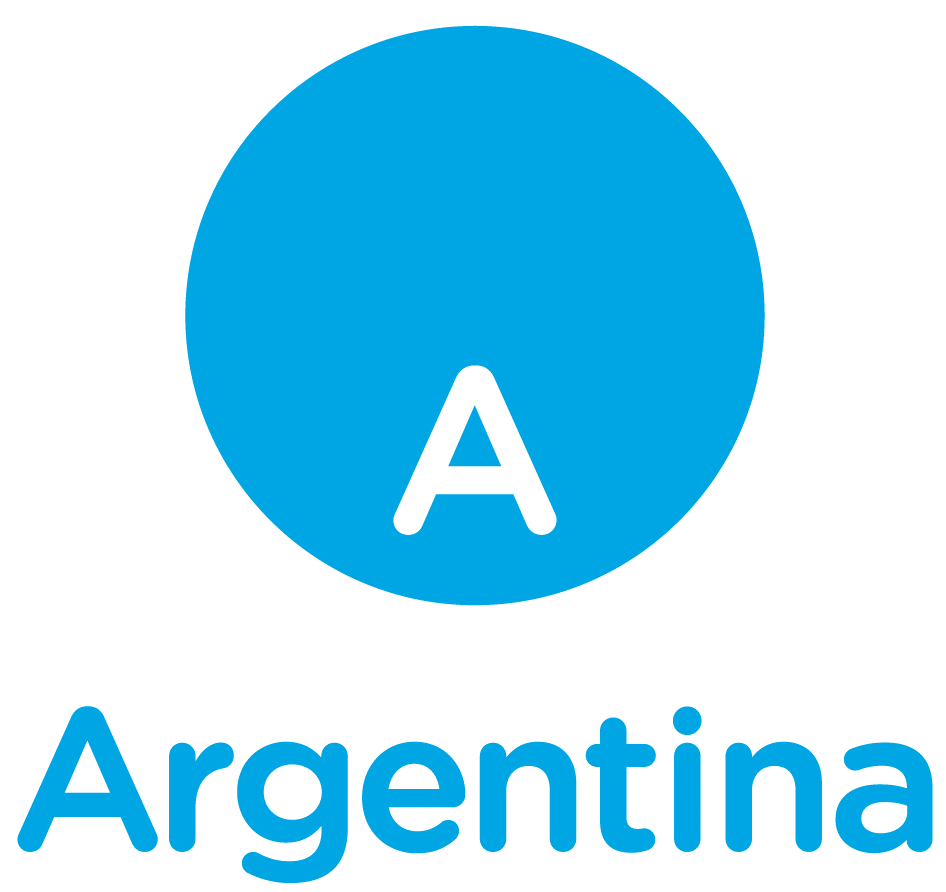
The Marca País logo introduced in 2018

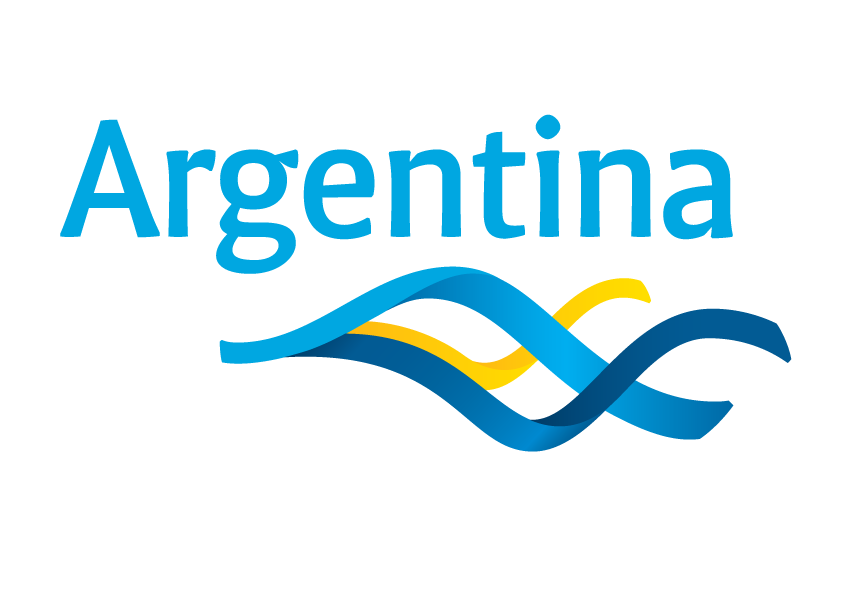
The previous logo used to brand the country.

The logo of Argentina refers to the official logo of the Marca País (MP), a State policy of nation branding that aims to promote tourism, boost exports, attract investments and spread Argentine culture.

The first logo came from the Contest for the Visual Identity of the Argentina Brand, which took place in 2006 and included some of the best designers in the country. Through the presidential decree 1372/2008, published on August 29 in the official gazette, the national government created the Intersectoral Commission on the Argentine Country Brand Strategy, formed by the Ministry of Foreign Affairs and International Trade, the Secretariat of Tourism, and the Secretariat of Media for Communication. Under the same decree, the logo representing Argentina abroad became official.

In 2018, Mauricio Macri's government renewed the Marca País and unveiled a new logo.
