= Chile bombings from 2005 =

Series of bomb attacks

A series of bomb attacks, which continued as of 2014 with about 200 bombs up to that date, started in the capital of Chile, Santiago, in 2005.

== The bombings ==
The bombs were constructed by placing gunpowder inside a fire extinguisher. About two-thirds of bombs detonated, with the remainder defused. Targets include banks (about a third of bombs), police stations, army barracks, churches, embassies, the headquarters of political parties, company offices, courthouses and government buildings. The bombs mostly detonate at night, and there have been few injuries amongst passers-by, none serious. The only fatality was a young anarchist, Mauricio Morales, who was killed in May 2009 by a bomb he was carrying. In 2011 another anarchist, Luciano Pitronello, was severely injured by a bomb he was planting.

== Claims of responsibility and notable incidents ==
Around 80 different groups claimed responsibility for the attacks; authorities do not know if they are dealing with a group that continually changes its name, or many separate cells. Some groups name themselves after past anarchists worldwide, including Leon Czolgosz, who assassinated US President William McKinley in 1901, and Jean-Marc Rouillan, a jailed French left-wing militant. "The friends of gunpowder" has also been used.

=== 2006 ===
Date	Type	Dead	Injured	Location	Details	Perpetrator	Part of
January 18	Bombing	0	1	Santiago	An artifact exploded near the National Agency Intelligence (ANI). A worker municipal result injured while cleaning the sector.	León Czolgosz Autonomous and Destructive Forces	

=== 2008 ===
Date	Type	Dead	Injured	Location	Details	Perpetrator	Part of
September 25	Bombing	0	1	Santiago	The Comando Johnny Cariqueo claimed responsibility in a blast it happened in the third police station in the Metropolitan region of Santiago. The attack left a Carabinero with minor injuries.	Comando Jhonny Cariqueo	

=== 2009 ===
Date	Type	Dead	Injured	Location	Details	Perpetrator	Part of
March 10	Bombing	0	0	Santiago	The Jean Marc Rouillan Armed and Heartless Columns claimed a bombing attack against a Mercedes-Benz in Santiago.	Jean Marc Rouillan Armed and Heartless Columns	
March 27	Attempted bombing	0	0	Valparaíso	An improvised bomb claims responsibility for an improvised device which that was abandoned and denoted in a controlled explosion by members of the GOPE. The Explosive device were left in the window, in the offices newspaper "El Mercurio de Valparaíso", in the city of Valparaíso. The Brigadas Autónomas y Rebeldes Norma Vergara Cáceres claimed responsibility for the incident, claiming that it was in honor of the death of Norma Vergara Caceres, a Chilean guerrilla which were killed during an encounter against Carabineros de Chile.	Brigadas Autónomas y Rebeldes Norma Vergara Cáceres	
May 4	Bombing	0	0	Puerto Montt, Llanquihue Province	An improvised device blast against the offices of Asociación de Productores SalmónChile and the Technological Institute of Salmon, in Puerto Montt, reported local media. The bomb planted by the "Comando Autónomo 3 de Mayo" caused a fire in the salmon farm's offices at 1:00 in the morning of May 4	Comando Autónomo 3 de Mayo	Mapuche conflict
November 3	Bombing	0	1	Las Condes	An improvised device blast in front of the Hotel Marriott de Santiago, in the commune of Las Condes, Santiago, detonating and causing property damage and a slightly injured guard. The authorities mentioned that the bomb was manufactured in a "professional" way, in addition to the fact that the attack was carried out in one of the most prosperous communes in Santiago. The group claimed responsibility for the attack, justifying its disagreement with Neoliberalism and social inequality in Chile and calling the owners of the hotel chain as "defenders and administrators of this order of hunger and slavery that has ended."	Banda Dinamitera Efraín Plaza Olmedo	
November 22	Bombing	0	0	Las Condes	November 22 a branch of BBVA Chile were severely destroyed after an explosion. Surgical gloves were found at the scene, presumably left by whoever planted the bomb in one of their bathrooms. The Carabineros Labs found the gloves with beads of sweat and after comparing the DNA with other detainees, there was no match.	Banda Dinamitera Efraín Plaza Olmedo (suspected)	

=== 2010 ===
Date	Type	Dead	Injured	Location	Details	Perpetrator	Part of
January 15	Bombing	0	3	Plaza de Armas, Santiago	An improvised device blast inside a Falabella store located in the Plaza de Armas in Santiago, leaving material damage and three slightly injured people (including a minor), in addition to the fact that no group claimed responsibility for the attack. a month later the group Banda Dinamitera Efraín Plaza Olmedo released a statement criticizing the attack, mentioning that it was labeled "unclear and unintelligible" since they claim that it affected civilians and that they are not the main target of the libertarian movement, pointing more to "centers of power "and government buildings.	Unknown	
January 16	Bombing	0	0	Santiago	A day after an improvised device blast in a high voltage tower near the prison Santiago 1, the attack were claimed by the Brigada Insurreccional Marco Camenisch.	Brigada Insurreccional Marco Camenisch	
September 17	Bombing	0	0	Las Condes, Santiago	An improvise device blast which affected an electrical transformer and a high voltage line in the commune of Las Condes, leaving only material damage, and momentary power failures. Days later a group calling itself "Comando Alex Lemun", which supports the Mapuche cause and the political prisoners.	Comando Alex Lemún	
December 22	Bombing	0	0	Las Condes, Santiago	An improvised device blast in a branch of BancoEstado in the commune of Las Condes, a few blocks from the residence of President Sebastián Piñera. The Comando Insurreccional Andrés Soto Pantoja claimed the attack in protest neoliberal policies in addition to showing solidarity with other arrested militants.	Comando Insurreccional Andrés Soto Pantoja	
December 20	Bombing	0	0	Independencia, Santiago	Militants of the Comando Vengativo 8 de Diciembre claimed responsibility for the attack against the Departamento de Tecnología e Informática de Carabineros (Department of technological research of Carabineros de Chile), in the commune of Independencia, leaving no injuries. The same night militants blast an improvised device in a branch of Santander in the commune of Santiago, leaving only material damages.	Comando Vengativo 8 de Diciembre	

=== 2011 ===
Date	Type	Dead	Injured	Location	Details	Perpetrator	Part of
February 7–11	Bombing	0	0	Santiago	A ring of bombings in bank branches in the communes of La Florida and Las Condes. The affected branches belonged to BBVA, BCI and BancoEstado, and the attacks left only material damages.	Comando 8 de Diciembre	
March 15	Bombing	0	0	Providencia, Santiago	An improvised device blasts against the offices Chilevisión causing only material damage.The attack was claimed by the Comando Insurrecional Aracely Romo claimed the attack accusing the television station of manipulating the opinion of the population, in addition to showing the corpse of the militant Mauricio Morales after his death	Comando Insurrecional Aracely Romo	
May 11	Arson, bombing	0	0	Quinta Normal, Peñalolén and Vitacura Santiago	An improvised explosive-incendiarie artefact was abandoned in a branch of Banco de Chile located in the commune of Vitacura, Santiago. In addition, the group was complicit in other acts of vandalism that occurred in Quinta Normal. In the same day militants threw Molotov cocktails against a local police court in the commune of Peñalolén. Carabineros Captain Marcelo Vilches, in charge of the procedure in the first instance, commented that "the guard did not appreciate how many people acted or their characteristics, since they were found inside the compound."	Anarchists and Núcleos Antagónicos de la Nueva Guerrilla Urbana	

=== 2012 ===
Date	Type	Dead	Injured	Location	Details	Perpetrator	Part of
May 1	Bombing	0	0	Temuco, Chile	An Improvised explosive device blast near a mausoleum belonging to former Carabineros de Chile, near a police station, at the same time, a phone call alerted to the installation of a similar element on the north campus of the Catholic University of Temuco. An anarchists cell so called Lumpenes Destructivos-Rodrigo Donoso Jiménez – Jose Huenante claimed responsibility for the attack.	Lumpenes Destructivos-Rodrigo Donoso Jiménez–Jose Huenante	Mapuche conflict

=== 2013 ===
Date	Type	Dead	Injured	Location	Details	Perpetrator	Part of
January 2	Bombing	0	0	Santiago, Chile	A handmade bomb blast near offices belonging to the Agrosuper (the Chile's largest food conglomerate). The Brigadas Incendiarias Mauricio Morales, claimed responsibility for the attack, and accusing the group of being the main responsible for the deforestation, erosion and animal mistreatment of the country.	Brigadas Incendiarias Mauricio Morales	

=== 2014 ===
Date	Type	Dead	Injured	Location	Details	Perpetrator	Part of
September 9–10	Bombing	0	1	Viña del Mar	Between September 9 and 10, 2014, two improvised bombs exploded in the Chilean resort town of Vina del Mar. On the night of September 9, a bomb detonated inside a supermarket, injuring one woman. The bomb consisted of a plastic bottle filled with aluminum and hydrochloric acid, was placed inside a trash can. The bomb exploded after the local janitor attempted to empty the trash can. The second device detonated inside the Open Plaza mall's bathroom.	Unknown	
September 24	Bombing	1	0	Santiago, Chile	A home made explosive device detonated inside a man's bag while he was carrying it. The victim was later identified as 29-year-old Sergio Landskron Silva. In the aftermath of the explosion Silva remained engulfed in flames while laying on the sidewalk. Bystanders and policemen failed to assist the victim, fearing that a second explosive device remained in his bag. Silva was pronounced dead several minutes after being transferred to a hospital. According to Silva's brother, he has been living on the streets for a prolonged period of time, while struggling with drug addiction. Silva was allegedly planning to plant the bomb in the Yungay neighborhood of Santiago.	Conspiración de Células de Fuego	

=== 2018 ===
Date	Type	Dead	Injured	Location	Details	Perpetrator	Part of
May 2	Attempted bombing	0	0	Santiago, Chile	Members of Carabineros de Chile and the Fiscalía sur investigate an improvised explosive device abandoned in the metropolitan area of Santiago. The explosive did not explode and was destroyed by members of the anti-explosive unit. The group Individualistas Tendiendo a los Salvaje claim responsibility for this and other bombs that didn't detonate.	Individualistas Tendiendo a los Salvaje	

=== 2020 ===
Date	Type	Dead	Injured	Location	Details	Perpetrator	Part of
February 27	Bombing	0	0	Vitacura, Chile	A makeshift explosive blast against a building in the comune of Vitacura, Santiago de Chile. The building belonging to a real estate company. The building were evacuated after registering a couple of explosions thirty minutes apart, without leaving injuries. The next day an anarchist cell, the so-called "Afinidades Armadas en Revuelta", claimed responsibility for the attack, saying that the objective of the first attack was against the wealthy class, while the second explosion was against members of GOPE accusing them as "rapers" and "murders".	Afinidades Armadas en Revuelta	

== Aftermath ==
Several suspects were arrested and prosecuted, but most were acquitted. Injured bomber Pitronello was tried, but convicted only of lesser offences and sentenced to house arrest. Hans Niemeyer, a Chilean sociologist and anarchist, was sentenced to five years' imprisonment for planting a bomb in a bank in November 2011. Authorities were investigating links between anarchist groups in Chile and Europe. Two Chilean anarchists who had been tried and acquitted in Chile were later arrested in Spain, and charged with planting a bomb in a church in Zaragoza in 2013, an attack claimed by a group named after Mateu Morral, a Spanish anarchist who attempted to assassinate the King of Spain in 1906. In 2010 a letter bomb was addressed to the Chilean embassy in Athens. An opinion poll in 2014 found that about two-thirds of Chileans feared the attacks and felt that the problem was escalating, with nearly 30 bombs in 2014 by August.

== See also ==
- 2014 Santiago subway bombing
- List of terrorist incidents
- Terrorism in Chile
