= Efraín Plaza Olmedo Dynamite Band =

- Banda Dinamitera Efraín Plaza Olmedo
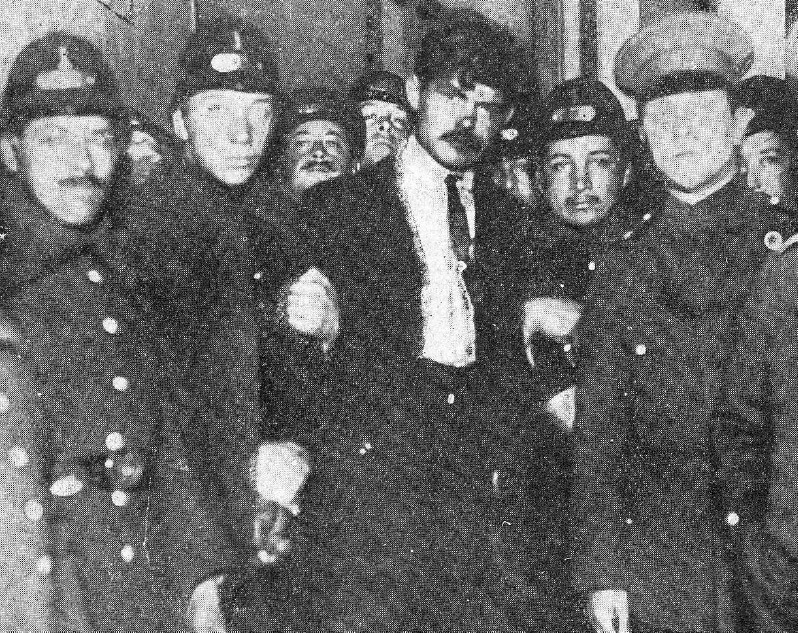
- Photograph of Efraín Plaza Olmedo being arrested, the group took inspiration from his actions and his ideas
- Dates active: 4 November 2009–2013
- Country: Chile
- Active regions: Santiago Metropolitan Region
- Ideology: Anti-authoritarianism; Anti-statism; Anti-capitalism; Insurrectionary anarchism Anarchism without adjectives Anarcho-communism; Illegalism
- Status: Inactive

The Efraín Plaza Olmedo Dynamite Band (Spanish: Banda Dinamitera Efraín Plaza Olmedo, BDEPO), also known as the Dynamite Gang (Spanish: Pandilla Dinamitera), was an urban guerrilla group active in Santiago, and known for its attacks against banks and the Hotel Marriott Santiago de Chile. The group named themselves after Efraín Plaza Olmedo, a Chilean anarchist responsible for a shooting that on 14 July 1912, fired at a crowd in the heart of Santiago, killing 2 young men from the wealthy class. He justified his attack as "a way to attract the attention of the people for their misery and the egotism of the bourgeoisie." He was sentenced to 40 years in prison. He was released in 1925, but was found dead days later without knowing if it was a suicide or if he was murdered.

== History ==
The Efraín Plaza Olmedo Dynamite Band was one of several anarchist cells that were created in the late 2000s, where they commonly attacked their targets with fire extinguishers filled with gunpowder or any medium-power explosive. About two-thirds of the bombs detonated, with the rest defused. Targets included banks (about a third of the bombs), police stations, army barracks, churches, embassies, the headquarters of political parties, company offices, courts and government buildings. The bombs were mainly detonated at night, and there were seldom injuries among passers-by, none of them seriously. The only fatality was a young anarchist, Mauricio Morales, who died on 22 May 2009, from a bomb he was carrying.

In 2011, another anarchist, Luciano Pitronello, was seriously injured by a bomb he was planting. Around 80 different groups claimed responsibility for the attacks. Authorities did not know if they were dealing with a group that continually changes its name or with many separate cells. Some groups named themselves as former anarchists around the world, including Leon Czolgosz, (who assassinated US President William McKinley in 1901), and Jean-Marc Rouillan, leader of the Direct Action group. "The friends of gunpowder" were also registered.

=== Attacks ===
In the early morning of 3 November 2009, an improvised explosive detonated in front of the Hotel Marriott Santiago de Chile, in the Las Condes district, causing material damage and a slightly injured guard. The authorities mentioned that the bomb was manufactured in a "professional" way, in addition to the fact that the attack was carried out in one of the richest districts of Santiago. The group claimed responsibility for the attack, justifying its disagreement with neoliberalism and social inequality in Chile and calling the owners of the hotel chain "defenders and administrators of this order of hunger and slavery."

On 22 November of the same year, an explosion was recorded in front of the BBVA bank branch, located on Cuarto Centenario avenue in front of the Rotonda Atenas, in the Las Condes district, leaving only material damage. Surgical gloves were left at the scene, presumably by whoever planted the bomb in one of its bathrooms. The Carabineros Laboratory (Labocar) found the gloves with beads of sweat and after comparing the DNA with other detainees, they found no match.

On 15 January 2010, an explosive device detonated inside a Falabella store located in the Plaza de Armas, leaving material damage and three people slightly injured (including a minor). No group claimed responsibility for the attack. A month later the group released a statement criticizing the attack, mentioning that it was rendered "unclear and unintelligible" since they claim that it affected civilians and that they were not the main target of the libertarian movement, pointing more to "centers of power" and government buildings. The group also showed solidarity with the arrest of anarchist militants during August 2010 and the arrest of Luciano Pitronello and five other militants.

== See also ==
- Anarchism in Chile
- Antagonic Nuclei of the New Urban Guerrilla
- Severino di Giovanni Antipatriot Band
- Manuel Rodríguez Patriotic Front
- Terrorism in Chile
- List of military units named after people
