= Leon Czolgosz Autonomous and Destructive Forces =

- Fuerzas Autónomas y Destructivas León Czolgosz
- Dates active: January 18, 2006–May 2009
- Country: Chile
- Active regions: Santiago Metropolitan Area
- Ideology: Anti-Americanism; Anti-patriotism; Anti-authoritarianism; Anti-imperialism; Illegalism; Individualist anarchism Insurrectionary anarchism
- Political position: Post-left
- Status: Inactive

The Leon Czolgosz Autonomous and Destructive Forces (Spanish: Fuerzas Autónomas y Destructivas León Czolgosz, FADLC, also known as the Leon Czolgosz Autonomous Attack Fraction), were a Chilean anarchist cell formed in September 2006, known for its attacks against the National Intelligence Agency of Chile and the British embassy in Chile. The name of the group was in honor of the American anarchist Leon Czolgosz, who on September 6, 1901 assassinated then-United States President William McKinley with two bullets at point-blank range.

== Context ==
This was one of several anarchist cells that were created in the late 2000s, where they commonly attacked their targets with fire extinguishers filled with gunpowder or any medium-strength explosive. About two-thirds of the bombs detonated, with the rest defused. Targets included banks (about a third of the bombs), police stations, army barracks, churches, embassies, the headquarters of political parties, company offices, courthouses and government buildings. The bombs detonated mainly at night, and there are seldom injuries among passers-by, none seriously. The only fatality was a young anarchist, Mauricio Morales, who died on May 22, 2009, from a bomb he was carrying. In 2011, another anarchist, Luciano Pitronello, was seriously injured by a bomb he was planting. About 80 different groups claimed responsibility for the attacks; the authorities did not know if they are dealing with a group that continually changed its name or with many separate cells. Some groups named themselves after former anarchists around the world, including Leon Czolgosz, who assassinated US President William McKinley in 1901, and Jean-Marc Rouillan, an imprisoned French leftist militant. "The friends of gunpowder" have also been registered.

== History ==
=== Attack on the ANI ===
On January 18, 2006, a device exploded near the National Intelligence Agency (ANI). A municipal worker was injured while cleaning the sector. Days later the group claimed responsibility for the attack in a statement, warning that communications from other cells are quickly downloaded from the internet and, therefore, some attacks have gone unnoticed.

The group was also responsible for an arson attack at the gates of the Military Cathedral of Chile, which occurred on September 7, 2006, the next day a mass was planned in honor of the soldiers killed during the RPMR attack against the former dictator Augusto Pinochet in Cajón del Maipo. The attack only left material damage to the doors and a partial cut of the electricity supply of some commercial premises adjacent to the Church. In addition, the group took responsibility for throwing a Molotov cocktail at one of the windows of the Palacio de La Moneda, during a demonstration.

Chilean authorities arrested Jorge Lizama Sazo (19 years old) on March 31, suspected of being involved in the attack on the car of Minister Gloria Ana Chevesich during a demonstration on the Day of the Young Combatant, in addition to being suspected of being related to the previous attacks. Lizama was released on April 11 due to lack of evidence, but he had to go weekly to sign at the North Central Prosecutor's Office.

=== Subsequent attacks ===
The group's next attack was until April 12, 2007, when they set fire to the doors of the headquarters of the Socialist Party of Chile, and on July 16 an explosion was recorded against the British embassy in Chile around 02:00 a.m. The attack left only material damage to the windows and doors of the building, reported members of the GOPE. The next day the group claimed responsibility for the attack, saying that it was retaliation for the British intervention in the Iraq War and in Afghanistan, This being another major attack carried out by the group.

On October 15, 2008, members of the group abandoned an explosive device in the parking lot of the casino belonging to the Chilean Investigative Police, located in the Plaza Brasil commune. The explosive was deactivated by members of the GOPE, highlighting the relationship with the one detonated a few months earlier in the commune of Ñuñoa. In a communiqué the group said "Professional executioners of the repression have not forgotten you, our attacks will be increasingly accurate and incessant," saying that the attack was in response to the murder of Jhonny Cariqueo and Marcelo Gonzáles, by Carabineros officers during 2008. It was not until 2009 that the group, together with the Severino di Giovanni Antipatriot Band and Jean Marc Rouillan Armed and Heartless Columns produced a document announcing more attacks, although they did not claim another.

== See also ==
- Anarchism in Chile
