= List of military units named after people =

The following article comprises a list of military units, paramilitary groups, irregular armies, and other related armed formations alike that are named after various renowned individuals.

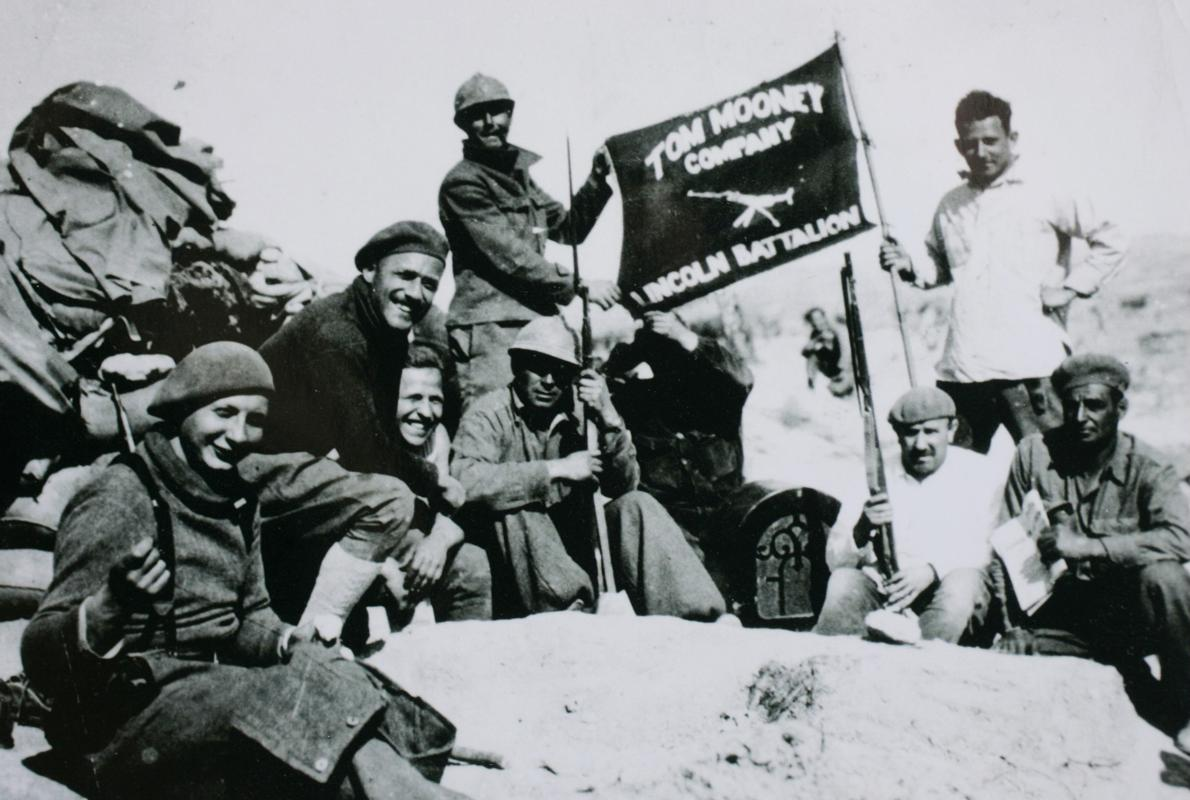
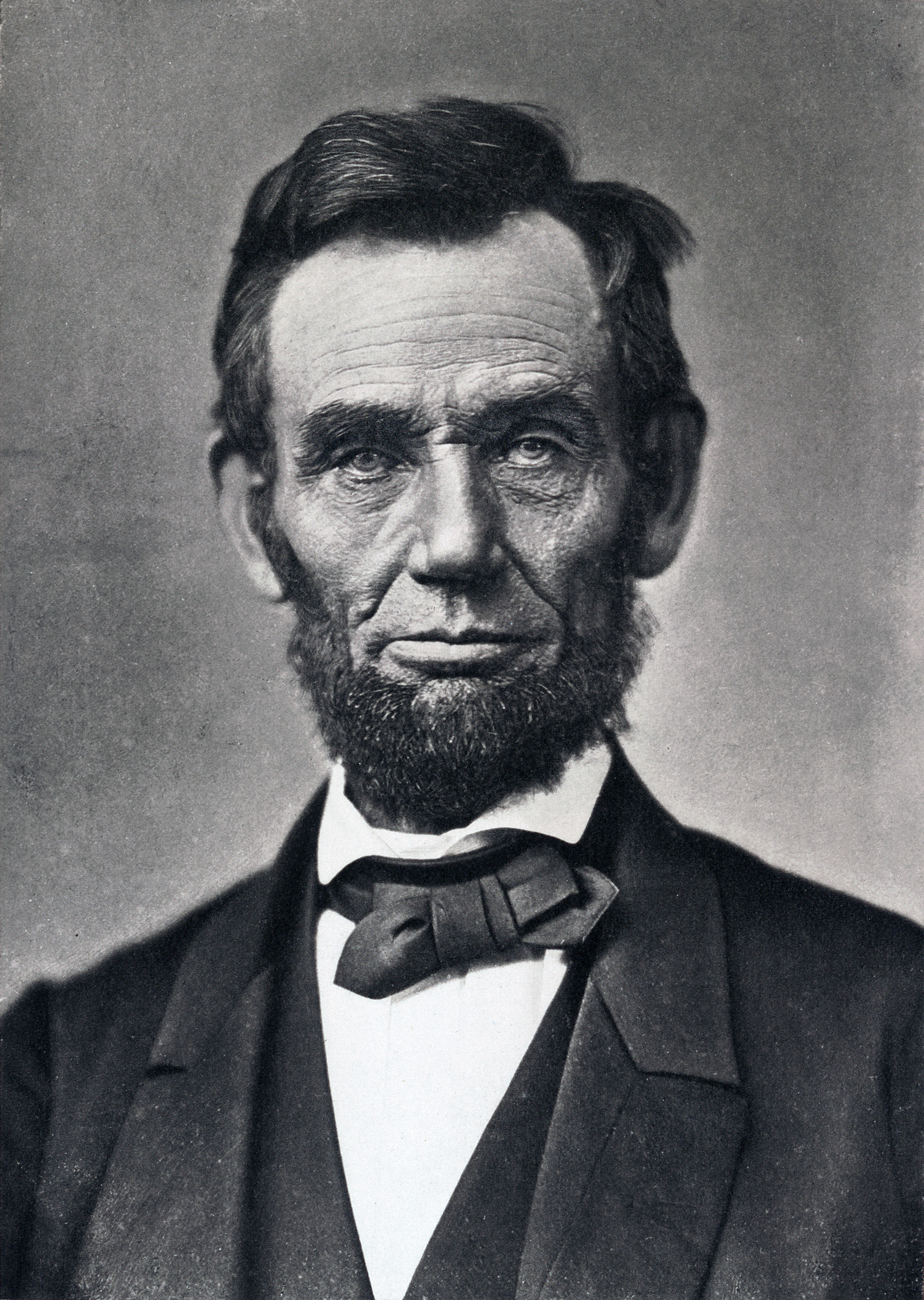
The Lincoln Battalion of the Spanish Civil War (left) took their name in homage to former US President Abraham Lincoln (right).

In addition to the official military and sub-military forces of various nations (both current and historical), this list also includes armed formations that are not under government administration such as volunteer militias, mercenary units, insurgent rebel groups, militant wings of political parties, extrajudicial death squads, guerilla armies, private military companies (PMCs), and terrorist-designated organizations.

However, combat units whose names include a particular ideological movement in them which happens to be derived after a certain individual it is associated with (e.g. “Marxist–Leninist”, “Sandinista” or “Christianity”) are not to be included in this article. For example, Guevarista Revolutionary Army would not be a permitted entry as the "Guevarista" part in its name refers to Guevarism, an eponymous political ideology named after communist revolutionary Che Guevara.

Up until the mid-18th century, regiments of the British Army were considered the property of their Colonel and most bore his name, changing names when transferred to another. For example, the Somerset Light Infantry was raised in 1685 by Theophilus Hastings, 7th Earl of Huntingdon and named the "Earl of Huntingdon's Regiment of Foot"; they underwent several name changes before being numbered the 13th Regiment of Foot in the 1750s. (see List of Regiments of Foot)

== List ==
=== 0–9 ===
- 1st Cavalry Division "Eugenio di Savoia" – named after Prince Eugene of Savoy (Italian: Principe Eugenio di Savoia).
- 1st Fallschirm-Panzer Division Hermann Göring – named after Hermann Göring, the final President of the Reichstag and former Commander-in-Chief of the Luftwaffe.
- 1st Tadeusz Kościuszko Infantry Division – named after Tadeusz Kościuszko, a Polish–Lithuanian military engineer and leader known for his involvement in the American Revolutionary War.
- 2nd Training Motor Rifle Division "Alp Arslan" – named after Alp Arslan, the second Sultan of the Great Seljuk Empire.
- 3rd Cavalry Division "Principe Amedeo Duca d'Aosta" – named after Prince Amedeo, Duke of Aosta (Italian: Principe Amedeo Duca d'Aosta)
- 3rd Operational Assignment Spartan Brigade "Petro Bolbochan"
- 5th Infantry Brigade "István Bocskai" – named after Stephen Bocskai (Hungarian: Bocskai István), a Hungarian nobleman and military leader during the late 16th and early 17th centuries.
- 7th SS Volunteer Mountain Division "Prinz Eugen" – named after Prince Eugene of Savoy (German: Prinz Eugen von Savoyen)
- 8th SS Cavalry Division "Florian Geyer" – named after Florian Geyer, German nobleman.
- 9th SS Panzer Division "Hohenstaufen" – named after the Hohenstaufen Dynasty.
- 10th SS Panzer Division "Frundsberg" – named after Georg von Frundsberg, a German soldier and military leader in the early 16th century.
- 11th Motor Rifle Division "Sultan Sanjar" – named after Ahmad Sanjar.
- 11th Separate Public Order Odessa Brigade "Mykhailo Hrushevsky"
- 14th Imam Hossein Division - named after Imam Hossein.
- 14th Mechanized Brigade "Prince Roman the Great" - named after Roman Mstislavich.
- 15th Operational Assignment Kara Dag Brigade "Hero of Ukraine Lieutenant Bohdan Zavada" - named after Ukrainian soldier Lieutenant Bohdan Zavada, who died in action.
- 17th Ali ibn Abi Taleb Division – named after Ali ibn Abi Talib, the fourth caliph of the Rashidun Caliphate and son-in-law of Prophet Muhammad.
- 17th SS Panzergrenadier Division "Götz von Berlichingen" – named after Renaissance-era German mercenary Götz von Berlichingen.
- 18th SS Volunteer Panzer Grenadier Division "Horst Wessel" – named after Horst Wessel, an Sturmabteilung leader killed by members of the rival KPD.
- 21st Waffen Mountain Division of the SS Skanderbeg – named after Skanderbeg, a 15th-century Albanian military commander
- 22nd SS Volunteer Cavalry Division Maria Theresia – named after Maria Theresa.
- 25th Infantry Brigade "György Klapka" – named after György Klapka.
- 25th Public Security Protection Brigade named after Prince Askold
- 25th Waffen Grenadier Division of the SS Hunyadi (1st Hungarian) – named after John Hunyadi, a Hungarian military leader of the 15th century.
- 27th Mohammad Rasulullah Division
- 31st Public Order Protection Brigade "Major General Oleksandr Radievskyi"
- 30th Prince Konstanty Ostrogski Mechanized Brigade – named after Konstanty Ostrogski.
- 33rd Al-Mahdi Division – named after Muhammad al-Mahdi.
- 37th SS Volunteer Cavalry Division Lützow – named after Napoleonic era Prussian lieutenant general Ludwig Adolf Wilhelm von Lützow.
- 40th Separate "Danylo Nechai" Regiment – named after Danylo Nechai.
- 44th Separate Artillery Brigade "Hetman Danylo Apostol" – named after Danylo Apostol.
- 45th Operational Assignment Lviv Regiment "Lieutenant Colonel Oleksandr Krasitskyi"
- 57th Otaman Kost Hordiienko Motorized Brigade – named after Kost Hordiienko, an 18th-century Kish otaman and co-author of the Constitution of Pylyp Orlyk.
- 68th Jaeger Brigade "Oleksa Dovbush" – named after Oleksa Dovbush, a Ukrainian outlaw and leader of the Opryshky movement.
- 92nd Assault Brigade "Ivan Sirko" – named after Zaporozhian Cossack military leader Ivan Sirko.
- 303rd "Tadeusz Kościuszko Warsaw" Fighter Squadron – named after 18th century Polish general Tadeusz Kościuszko.

=== A–F ===
- Abraham Lincoln Brigade – named after Abraham Lincoln, the 16th president of the United States.
- Abu Ali Mustafa Brigades – named after Abu Ali Mustafa, a communist Palestinian militant who served as the General Secretary of the Popular Front for the Liberation of Palestine until his assassination by Israeli forces in 2001.
- Abu Nidal Organization – named after Palestinian political leader Abu Nidal.
- Akhmat special forces unit – named after Akhmat Kadyrov, the first President of the Chechen Republic.
- Al-Abbas Brigade – named after Abbas ibn Ali.
- Al-Hajj Radwan Force – Hezbollah unit, named for Imad Mughniyeh (alias "Al-Hajj Radwan")
- Al-Khansaa Brigade – presumed to be named after 7th-century Arabian tribeswoman al-Khansa'.
- Al-Nasser Salah al-Deen Brigades – named after Salah ad-Din Yusuf ibn Ayyub.
- Al-Qassam Brigades – named after Izz ad-Din al-Qassam.
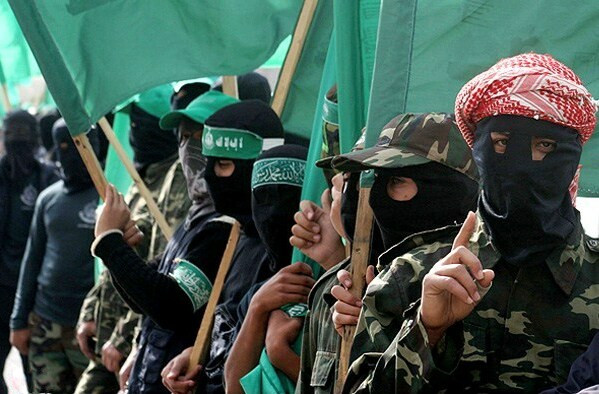
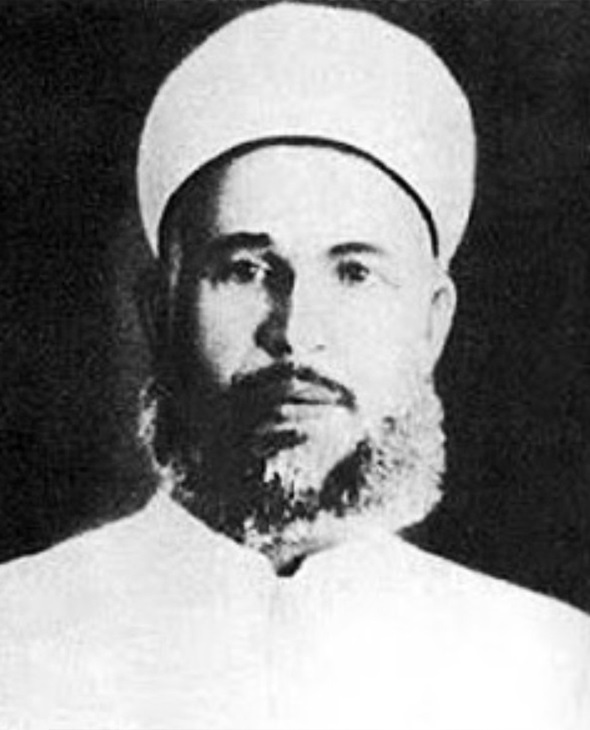
  Members of the Al-Qassam Brigades (left) in 2011. This military wing named itself after Izz ad-Din al-Qassam (right), a Syrian-born Islamic preacher and guerrilla leader.
- al-Zulfikar – named after Zulfikar Ali Bhutto.
- Alex Boncayao Brigade – named after Filipino labor leader Alex Boncayao who was killed by Philippine government security forces in 1983.
- Ali ibn Abi Talib Battalion – named after Ali ibn Abi Talib.
- Andrew Mlangeni Regiment – named after Andrew Mlangeni.
- Antonio Gramsci Battalion – named after Antonio Gramsci, an Italian Marxist intellectual who died in 1937 as a result of health complications he accumulated from longterm imprisonment with unsanitary conditions.
- Arkan's Tigers – namesake of its founder and first commander Željko "Arkan" Ražnatović.
- Armée du Colonel Barakat – named after Antoine Barakat.
- Army Detachment Kempf – named after Werner Kempf.
- Army Detachment Steiner – named after Felix Steiner.
- Ascaso Column– Republican unit of the Spanish Civil War, named for anarcho-syndicalist Francisco Ascaso
- AWD Finland "Siitoin Squadron" – named after Pekka Siitoin, a Finnish neo-Nazi occultist.
- Baader–Meinhof Group – named after Andreas Baader and Ulrike Meinhof.
- Babini Group – named after Valentino Babini.
- Bagramyan Battalion – named after Soviet Armenian military commander Ivan Bagramyan.
- Baqir Brigade – named after Muhammad al-Baqir.
- Battaglioni M – named after Benito Mussolini ("M" for Mussolini), the Prime Minister of Italy during the country's Fascist era.
- Bogdan Khmelnitsky Battalion – named after Bohdan Khmelnytsky.
- Brackett's Minnesota Cavalry Battalion – named after Alfred Bruce Brackett.
- Brigade "Rey Alfonso XIII" II of the Legion – named after Alfonso XIII.
- Brigate Garibaldi – named after Giuseppe Garibaldi.
- Cavalry Corps Schmettow – named after Eberhard Graf von Schmettow.
- Carlos Palomino International Brigade – named after Carlos Javier Palomino Muñoz, a Spanish teenager who was stabbed to death by a Basque neo-Nazi skinhead while heading to counter-protest at an anti-immigrant rally in Madrid.
- Carlos Patiño Front – named after Carlos Arturo Patiño Restrepo, a Colombian far-left paramilitary commander and drug trafficker reputedly affiliated with the Norte del Valle Cartel.
- Centuria Malatesta – named after Italian anarchist revolutionary Errico Malatesta.
- Charlemagne Division – named after Charlemagne, King of the Franks and Holy Roman Emperor.
- Clan Úsuga – Colombian paramilitary drug cartel, led by brothers Juan and Dario Úsuga
- Connolly Column – named after James Connolly, an Irish republican and revolutionary socialist who was executed by Imperial British soldiers for his role in the Easter Rising.
- Creuzbourg's Jäger Corps – namesake of its commander Karl Adolf Christoph von Creutzburg.
- Dąbrowski Brigade – named after Jarosław Dąbrowski.
- De Watteville's Regiment – named after Louis de Watteville.
- Detachment Brandenstein – namesake of its commander Otto von Brandenstein.
- Descendants of Saladin Brigade – named after Saladin, founder of the Ayyubid dynasty as well as the first sultan of both Egypt and Syria.
- Dillon's Regiment (France) – named after Theobald Dillon, 7th Viscount Dillon.
- Dimitrov Battalion – named after Bulgarian far-left politician and founder of the Bulgarian Communist Party, Georgi Dimitrov.
- Dirlewanger Brigade – namesake of its commanding officer, Oskar Dirlewanger.
- Division von Broich/von Manteuffel – initially named after Friedrich Freiherr von Broich during the time that the unit existed as Division von Broich. The unit was later renamed to Division von Manteuffel after Hasso von Manteuffel was appointed as its new commander in 1943.
- Drabant Corps of Charles XII – named after Charles XII of Sweden, the King of Sweden from 1697 to 1718.
- Durruti Column – named after its commander Buenaventura Durruti, a Spanish anarcho-syndicalist revolutionary and anti-fascist militant.
- Dzhokhar Dudayev Battalion – named after Dzhokhar Dudayev, a Chechen nationalistic statesman who served as the first president of the Chechen Republic of Ichkeria.
- Efraín Plaza Olmedo Dynamite Band – a Chilean urban guerilla group, named for anarchist Efraín Plaza Olmedo.
- Emilia Plater Independent Women's Battalion – named after Emilia Plater.
- Emmet Monument Association – named after Robert Emmet.
- Fallschirmjäger-Division Erdmann – named after its commander, Generalleutnant Wolfgang Erdmann.
- Fallschirm-Panzergrenadier Division 2 Hermann Göring – named after Hermann Göring.
- Fedayeen Saddam – named after then-Iraqi president Saddam Hussein.
- Felix Dzerzhinsky Guards Regiment – named after Felix Dzerzhinsky.
- Forces of Martyr Ahmad al-Abdo – the name of this military unit is said to be referring to either Syrian rebel commander Ahmad al-Abdo or Ahmad al-Abdo al-Saeed, a Syrian civilian who was killed during the Syrian revolution.
- Freikorps Caspari – named after its commander Walter Caspari.

=== G–M ===
- Garibaldi Battalion – named after former Deputy of the Kingdom of Italy and soldier of the Risorgimento: Giuseppe Garibaldi.
- Garibaldi Brigade – named after Giuseppe Garibaldi, an Italian general, nationalist, and revolutionary who played a crucial role in the unification of Italy.
- Gajaba Regiment – named after Gajabahuka Gamani, a legendary Sri Lankan king who ruled the ancient Anuradhapura Kingdom.
- Gastone Sozzi Centuria – named after Italian communist Gastone Sozzi.
- George Jackson Brigade – named after American black power activist and Black Guerrilla Family founder George Jackson.
- George Washington Battalion – named after American founding father George Washington, who served as the very first president of the United States.
- Grey's Scouts – named after Sir George Grey.
- Hadžiefendić Legion – named after Muhamed Hadžiefendić.
- Hatch's Minnesota Cavalry Battalion – named after Edwin Aaron Clark Hatch.
- Hazen's Regiment – named after Moses Hazen.
- HDF 34th Bercsényi László Special Forces Battalion – named after Ladislas Ignace de Bercheny.
- Henri Barbusse Battalion – named after Henri Barbusse, a French communist and novelist.
- Hezb-e Islami Gulbuddin – named after Gulbuddin Hekmatyar.
- Hezb-i Islami Khalis – named after Mohammad Yunus Khalis.
- Hitler's Henchmen – named after Adolf Hitler, the leader of Nazi Germany.
- Hlinka Guard – named after Andrej Hlinka, a Slovak Clerico-Fascist politician who founded and led the Slovak People's Party up until his death in 1938.
- Houthis – named after the family (Al-Houthi family) of the group's founder, Hussein al-Houthi.
- Huey P. Newton Gun Club – named after Black Panther Party founder and far-left African-American civil rights activist Huey P. Newton.
- Hundred Thousand Sons of Saint Louis – named after Louis XVIII.
- Ibn Taymiyyah Brigade – named after Ibn Taymiyya.
- Imam al-Mahdi Scouts – named after Muhammad al-Mahdi.
- Jaysh Muhammad in Bilad al-Sham – named after Muhammad.
- Imam Ali Battalion – named after Imam Ali, the fourth and final caliph of the Rashidun Caliphate.
- Imam Shamil Battalion – named after Imam Shamil, a political and military leader of the Caucasian resistance against the Russian Empire in the 19th century.
- Infantry Division Ferdinand von Schill – named after Ferdinand von Schill, a Prussian Army major known for leading an attempted revolt against the Napoleonic forces in Germany.
- Infantry Division Friedrich Ludwig Jahn – named after German nationalist Friedrich Ludwig Jahn.
- Infantry Division Schlageter – named after Albert Leo Schlageter.
- Infantry Division Theodor Körner – named after Carl Theodor Körner.
- Isaac Puente Battalion – named after Isaac Puente, a Spanish physician and anarchist, known for his contributions to anarcho-communist thought and his role in the Spanish anarchist movement.
- Jan Žižka partisan brigade – named after Jan Žižka, a Czech military commander and a key leader of the Hussite Wars.
- John Brown Anti-Klan Committee – named after John Brown.
- Jean Marc Rouillan Armed and Heartless Columns – named after Jean Marc Rouillan.
- Jihad Jibril Brigades – namesake of its former commander Jihad Ahmed Jibril.
- Jovan Šević Detachment – named after 18th-century Slavo-Serbian military officer Jovan Šević.
- Kadyrovites – named after Chechen pro-Russian warlord Ramzan Kadyrov in order to designate their allegiance to him.
- Kaminski Brigade – named after Bronislav Kaminski.
- Karrer Regiment – named after the group's founder and first colonel-proprietor Franz Adam Karrer.
- Kastuś Kalinoŭski Regiment – named after Kastuś Kalinoŭski, a Polish-Belarusian revolutionary activist who was one of the leaders of the January Uprising. Kalinoŭski has posthumously become a national hero and icon of Belarusian nationalism along with the Belarusian democracy movement.
- Khalid ibn al-Walid Brigade – named after Khalid ibn al-Walid, a prominent Arab general and military strategist from the 7th century who played a crucial role in the early spread of Islam.
- Khamis Brigade – namesake of the brigade's commanding general Khamis Gaddafi.
- Kit Carson Scouts – named after American frontiersman Kit Carson.
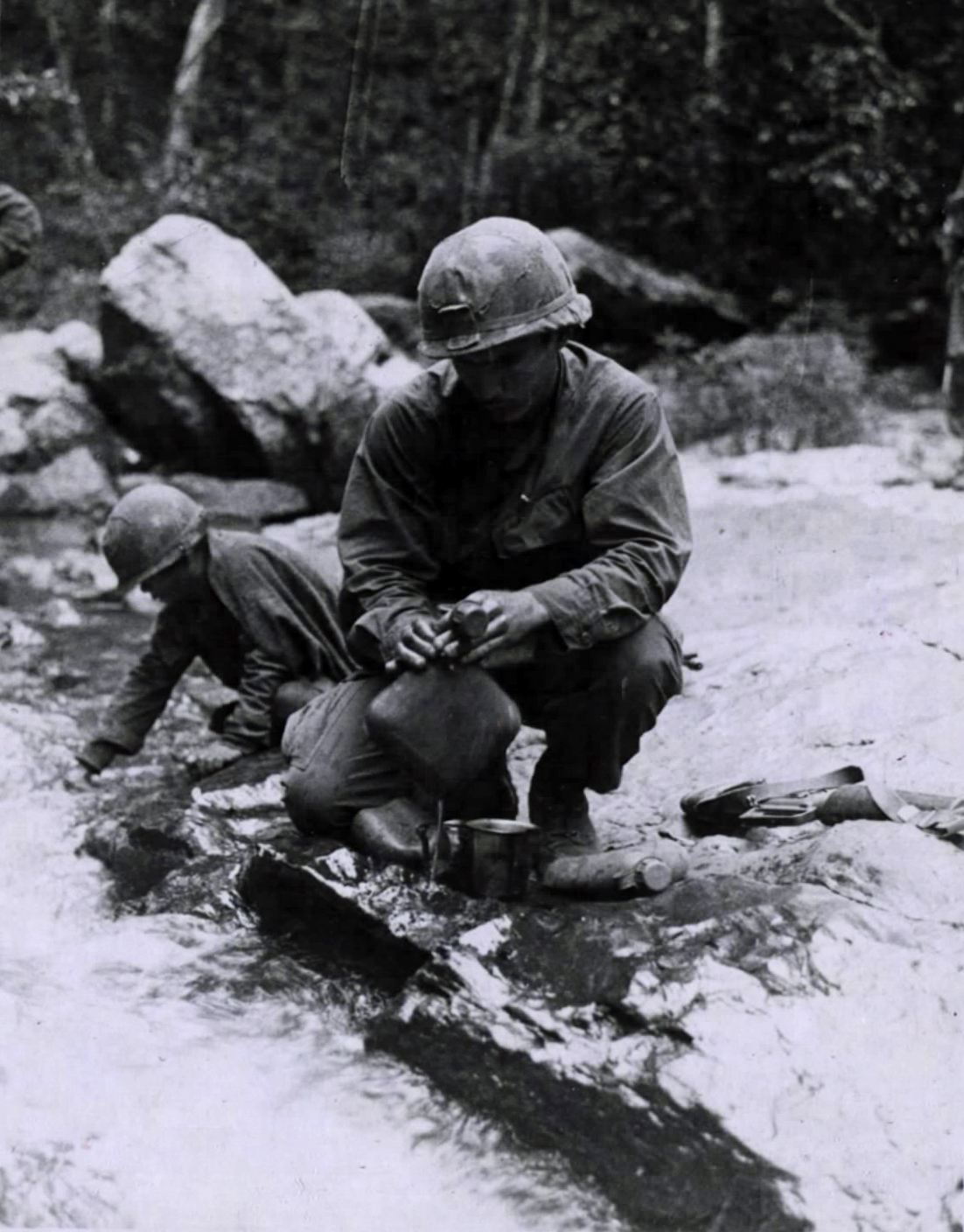
  A pair of Kit Carson Scouts in 1968 during the Vietnam War. The unit was named as tribute to Christopher "Kit" Carson, a United States Union Army general
- Krempler Legion – named after its commander Karl von Krempler, a German SS-Standartenführer and SS- und Polizeiführer who managed to coordinate a Bosnian Muslim volunteer division of the Waffen-SS to fight against the Allied Powers during the country's Nazi era.
- Kuer Sena – named after Kunwar Singh, a prominent leader of the Indian Rebellion of 1857.
- Lafayette Escadrille – named after Marquis de Lafayette, a French aristocrat and military officer who played a crucial role in both the American Revolution and the French Revolution.
- Lafayette Flying Corps – named after Marquis de Lafayette.
- Légion Garibaldienne – named after Peppino Garibaldi.
- Legion of Saint Stephen – named after Saint Stephen, the first Christian martyr and one of the first deacons of the early Church.
- Legion of St. George – named after Saint George.
- Leon Czolgosz Autonomous and Destructive Forces – named after Leon Czolgosz, a Polish-American anarchist who assassinated President William McKinley of the United States.
- Leon Sedov Brigade – named after Leon Sedov, a Russian communist politician and the son of Leon Trotsky.
- Lincoln Battalion – named after Abraham Lincoln, the 16th president of the United States.
- Lorenzen Group – namesake of its leader Jørgen Lorenzen.
- Louise Michel battalions – named after 19th-century French anarcha-feminist Louise Michel.
- Lucetti Battalion – named after Italian anarchist revolutionary Gino Lucetti.
- Lützow Free Corps – namesake of its commander Ludwig Adolf Wilhelm von Lützow.
- Mackenzie–Papineau Battalion – named after William Lyon Mackenzie and Louis-Joseph Papineau, two prominent Canadian political leaders of the 1837 Rebellion.
- Makhnovtsy – named after Nestor Makhno.
- Maletti Group – namesake of the unit's general officer, Pietro Maletti.
- Manuel Rodríguez Patriotic Front – named after Manuel Rodríguez Erdoíza, a prominent Chilean lawyer, politician, and military leader during the Chilean War of Independence.
- Mariano Sánchez Añón Insurrectional Cell – a Mexican urban guerrilla group, named for Mariano Sánchez Añón
- Maroto Column – named after its commander Francisco Maroto del Ojo.
- Martyr Abu Jaafar Brigade – named after Abu Jaafar, a regional commander of Hezbollah's Syrian branch who was killed by the Israel Defence Forces during the 2006 Lebanon War.
- Martyr Mashaal Tammo Brigade – named after Syrian Kurdish political activist and democratic opposition leader Mashaal Tammo who was extrajudicially assassinated by Ba'athist Syrian government forces via direct orders from Bashar al-Assad.
- Martyr Nubar Ozanyan Brigade – named after Turkish-born Armenian Maoist revolutionary Nubar Ozanyan.
- Mickiewicz Battalion – named after Adam Mickiewicz, a 19th century Polish-Lithuanian Romantic poet, writer, and political activist.
- Movimiento Armado Quintin Lame – named after Manuel Quintín Lame, a 20th century Native Colombian leader, activist, and revolutionary who fought for the rights of Indigenous peoples, particularly the Paez people, against land dispossession and discrimination.
- Mozart Group – named after 18th-century Austrian classical music composer Wolfgang Amadeus Mozart.
- Mu'tasim Division – named after al-Mu'tasim, the final caliph of the Abbasid dynasty.

=== N–T ===
- Naftali Botwin Company – named after Polish Communist and labor activist Naftali Botwin.
- Noman Çelebicihan Battalion – named after Noman Çelebicihan, the first and only president of the short-lived Crimean People's Republic as well as the first mufti of Crimea, Lithuania, and Poland.
- O'Brien's Regiment – named after Daniel O'Brien, 3rd Viscount Clare.
- Opera Nazionale Balilla – named after Genoese folk hero Giovan Battista "Balilla" Perasso.
- Osvald Group – named after the unit's founder and first commander Martin "Osvald" Hjelmen.
- OUN-B – named after the group's leader Stepan Bandera (the "B" in the title standing for "Bandera"), a far-right Ukrainian nationalist and collaborator with the Axis powers during WWII who campaigned for Ukraine's independence from the Soviet Union.
- Palafox Battalion – named after José de Palafox y Melci, 1st Duke of Zaragoza.
- Panzer Division Clausewitz – named after Carl von Clausewitz.
- Panzer Division "Kempf" – named after its commander, Werner Kempf.
- Pavel Sudoplatov Battalion – named after senior Soviet intelligence officer Pavel Sudoplatov.
- Pećanac Chetniks – named after Kosta Pećanac.
- People's Militia named after Minin and Pozharsky – named after Kuzma Minin and Dmitry Pozharsky.
- Peter group – named after the group's organizer Peter Schäfer (the nom de guerre of Otto Schwerdt).
- Práxedis G. Guerrero Autonomous Cells of Immediate Revolution
- Princess Irene Brigade – named after Princess Irene of the Netherlands.
- Puget Sound John Brown Gun Club – named after American abolitionist figure John Brown.
- Pyotr Alexeyev Resistance Movement – named after Russian revolutionary worker Pyotr Alexeyevich Alexeyev.
- Quantrill's Raiders named after its leader William Quantrill.
- Rafallah al-Sahati Brigade – named after Rafallah Sahati, a Libyan anti-Gaddafi rebel who was killed by Libyan Arab Jamahiriya forces in March 2011 during the First Libyan Civil War.
- Rákosi Battalion – named after Hungarian Communist politician Mátyás Rákosi who served as the country's de facto leader from 1947 to 1956.
- Ranvir Sena – named after Ranvir Baba.
- Regiment Carabiniers Prins Boudewijn – Grenadiers – named after Prince Baudouin of Belgium (Dutch: Prins Boudewijn van België).
- Regiment de Meuron – named after Charles-Daniel de Meuron.
- Régiment Royal-Louis – named after Louis XVI.
- Rodrigo Franco Command – named after Rodrigo Franco Montes de Peralta
- Roll's Regiment – named after Louis de Roll.
- Rollkommando Hamann – named after its commander Joachim Hamann.
- Sacco-Vanzetti Battalion – named after Italian-American anarchist duo Nicola Sacco and Bart Vanzetti.
- Saint Patrick's Battalion – named after Saint Patrick.
- Sarsfield Grenadier Guards – named after Patrick Sarsfield, 1st Earl of Lucan.
- Schutzmannschaft-Brigade Siegling – named after Hans Siegling.
- Severino di Giovanni Antipatriot Band named after Severino Di Giovanni.
- Sheikh Mansur Battalion – named after Chechen military commander Sheikh Mansur.
- Sheikh Omar Hadid Brigade – named after Umar Hadid, a prominent field commander during the Islamist occupation of Fallujah.
- Simón Bolívar Guerrilla Coordinating Board – named after Simón Bolívar, a Venezuelan military officer who led a successful liberation campaign against Imperial Spanish rule in the Viceroyalty of New Granada.
- Skala Battalion – named after Yuriy "Skala" Harkaviy.
- Sons of Zouari – named after Mohamed Zouari, a Tunisian aerospace engineer and Hamas operative who was a key figure in the development of drone technology.
- SS Brigade Schuldt – named after Hinrich Schuldt.
- SS Panzer Brigade Gross – named after Martin Gross.
- SSNP – Abd al-Masih Wing – named after Lebanese journalist and political activist George Abd al-Masih.
- Stern Gang a Zionist militant organization founded by Avraham Stern
- Sultan Mehmed the Conqueror Brigade – named after Mehmed II.
- Sultan Murad Division – named after Murad IV.
- Sultan Pasha al-Atrash Battalion – named after Sultan al-Atrash, a prominent Syrian Druze independence activist who was one of the leading figures in the Great Syrian Revolt.
- Sultan Suleiman Shah Brigade – named after Kayi tribe Bey (tribal chieftain) Suleyman Shah who was the reported grandfather of Ottoman empire founder Osman I.
- Szent László Infantry Division – named after Saint Ladislas. (Hungarian: Szent László).
- Taras Shevchenko Company – named after Taras Shevchenko.
- Tercio "Alejandro Farnesio" No. 4 of the Legion – named after 16th-century Italian duke Alejandro Farnesio.
- Tercio "Duque de Alba" No. 2 of the Legion – named after Duque de Alba.
- Tercio "Gran Capitán" No. 1 of the Legion – the group's name pays homage to Gonzalo Fernández de Córdoba who went by the nickname "El Gran Capitán".
- Tercio "Juan de Austria" No. 3 of the Legion – named after Juan de Austria.
- Thälmann Battalion – named after Ernst Thälmann, a German communist politician and leader of the Communist Party of Germany.
- The Other Russia of E. V. Limonov – named after its founder Eduard Veniaminovich Limonov, a Russian National Bolshevik politician and countercultural author.
- Torres-Benedito Column – named after its commanding duo Domingo Torres and José Benedito Lleó.
- Tudor Vladimirescu Division – named after Romanian revolutionary hero Tudor Vladimirescu.
- Túpac Amaru Revolutionary Movement – named after Inca revolutionary leader Túpac Amaru II who had led a rebellion during the 1700s against the occupying Spanish Empire in Colonial Peru.
- Túpac Katari Guerrilla Army – named after Túpac Katari.

=== U–Z ===
- Ukrainian interbrigade company Taras Shevchenko – named after 19th century Ukrainian poet and national hero Taras Shevchenko.
- Vandalika Teodoro Suárez Gang – named after Teodoro Suárez.
- Vlasov Army – informally named after the unit's founder and commander Andrey Vlasov.
- Wagner Group – named after Richard Wagner, an influential 19th-century German opera composer.
- Zainebiyoun Division – "Followers of Zaynab", a Shia Khomeinist militia group.
- Zośka Battalion – named after Tadeusz "Zośka" Zawadzki, a World War II Polish resistance fighter and one of the most important personalities of the Polish Underground State.

== See also ==
- Eponym
- List of army units called "guards"
- List of ideologies named after people
- List of military corps by name
- List of places named after people
- List of sports terms named after people
- List of U.S. military vessels named after women
