= Severino di Giovanni Antipatriot Band =

Chilean urban guerrilla group

- Banda Antipatriota Severino di Giovanni
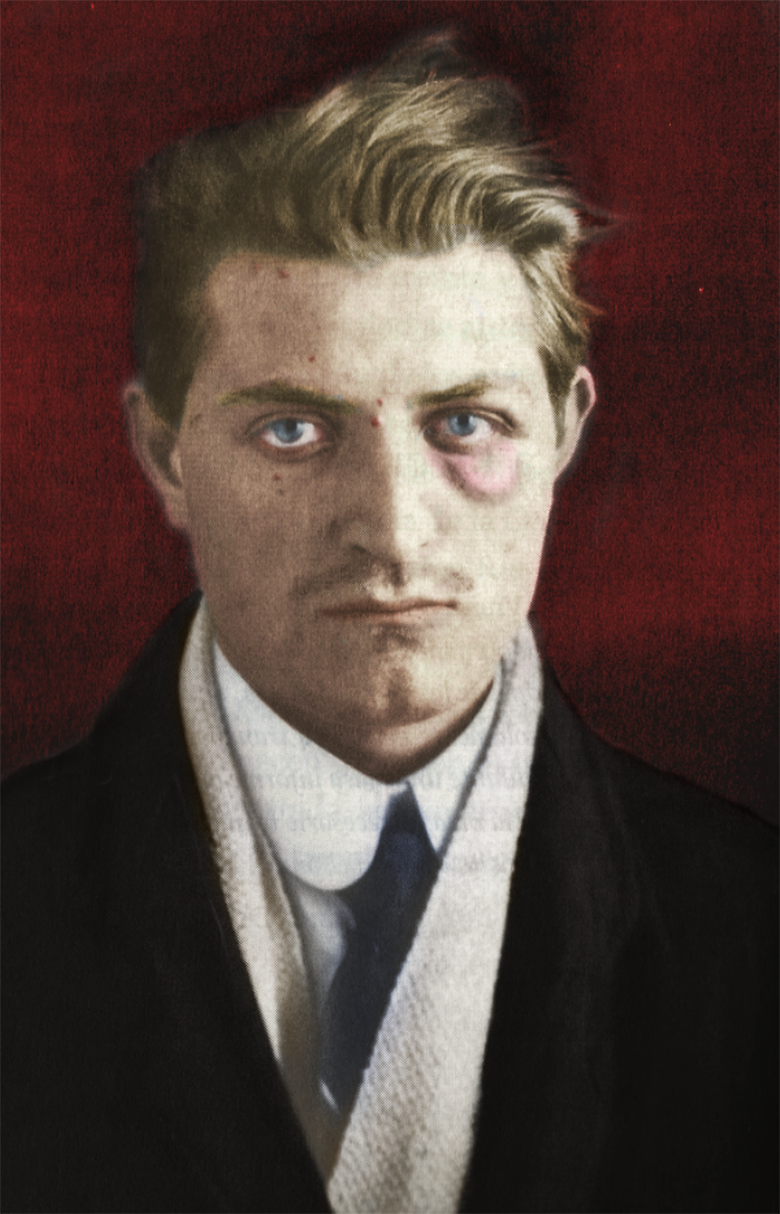
- Photograph of Severino di Giovanni, Italian anarchist who influenced the group's actions
- Dates active: May 21, 2007–2012
- Country: Chile
- Active regions: Santiago
- Ideology: Anarcho-communism; Anti-patriotism; Anti-authoritarianism; Anti-statism; Individualist anarchism Insurrectionary anarchism
- Political position: Far-left
- Status: Inactive

The Severino di Giovanni Antipatriot Band was an urban guerrilla in Santiago, responsible for several arson attacks and explosives. The name was inspired by Severino di Giovanni, an Italian anarchist, journalist, worker and poet who died in Buenos Aires in 1931.

== History ==
This was one of several anarchist cells that were created in the late 2000s, where they commonly attacked their targets with fire extinguishers filled with gunpowder or any medium-strength explosive. About two-thirds of the bombs detonated, with the rest defused. Targets include banks (about a third of the bombs), police stations, army barracks, churches, embassies, the headquarters of political parties, company offices, courthouses and government buildings. The bombs detonated mainly at night, and there were rarely injuries among passers-by, none seriously. The only fatality was a young anarchist, Mauricio Morales, who died on May 22, 2009, from a bomb he was carrying. In 2011, another anarchist, Luciano Pitronello, was seriously injured by a bomb he was planting. About 80 different groups claimed responsibility for the attacks. The authorities do not know if they were dealing with a group that continually changed its name or with many separate cells. Some groups named themselves after former anarchists around the world, including Leon Czolgosz, who assassinated United States President William McKinley in 1901, and Jean-Marc Rouillan, an imprisoned French leftist militant. "The friends of gunpowder" was also registered.

The group showed solidarity for the death of the militant Mauricio Morales. La Banda also expressed solidarity with those arrested after the 2014 Santiago subway bombing, and accused the authorities of a political persecution calling it "worthy of the military dictatorship." Several suspects were arrested and prosecuted, but most were acquitted.

=== Attacks ===
The group's first attack was on May 21, 2007, in an explosion against the facilities of the Chilean Labor Directorate. Its most publicized attack was an explosive left on the outskirts of the Tierra Noble restaurant located on Av. Nueva Costanera in Vitacura. On August 5, 2010, at the time of the call to the authorities, they evicted twenty diners, followed by a GOPE operation.

== See also ==
- Anarchism in Argentina
- Antagonic Nuclei of the New Urban Guerrilla
- Weichán Auka Mapu
- Coordinadora Arauco-Malleco
