= Antagonic Nuclei of the New Urban Guerrilla =

Chilean armed group

- Núcleos Antagónicos de la Nueva Guerrilla Urbana
- Logo used by Núcleos Antagónicos de la Nueva Guerrilla Urbana
- Dates active: 11 May 2011–present
- Country: Chile
- Active regions: Santiago Metropolitan Region
- Ideology: Insurrectionary anarchism Anarchism without adjectives Anarcho-communism; Anti-statism; Anti-capitalism; Illegalism
- Status: Inactive

The Antagonic Nuclei of the New Urban Guerrilla (Spanish: Núcleos Antagónicos de la Nueva Guerrilla Urbana, NANGU) is a Chilean armed group created in mid-2011, active in the Santiago Metropolitan Region attached to insurrectionary anarchist theories, being responsible for several attacks in the 2010s.

== History ==
Its first attack was on 11 May 2011, when an explosive-incendiary device was left at a Banco de Chile branch located in the Vitacura district. In addition, the group was complicit in other acts of vandalism that occurred in Quinta Normal and Peñalolén. On 24 December 2013, the group released a statement about the death of Sebastian Oversluij, an anarchist guerrilla who participated in some attack groups in addition to being a leader referenced by other militants.

=== Activities and Attacks ===
Their first solo attack was when they left a bank branch in the Vitacura district on 5 November 2011, in a statement four years later they explain that this group was in disuse due to tactical differences with other militants. On 20 November 2011, a cell of the group (Anonimxs por la Destrucción) left a simulated device, which was collected by members of the police and the GOPE. In a statement, the group said that the device was loaded with explosives, but the detonator failed, something that the authorities have not confirmed. Years later it claimed to have placed simulated devices in squares of Santiago on 30 December 2015.

On 11 February 2016, an explosive device was deactivated by sappers belonging to the Gendarmerie, becoming a media incident and being considered a terrorist incident by the Ministry of the Interior and Public Security. On 3 December 2016, a simulated device was left near the Pajaritos metro, which caused the mobilization of Carabineros. On 27 December 2017, an incendiary device was found on the Transantiago bus, route 107. When the object was located, the bus stopped at a mall to call the police. The device was composed of two plastic bottles with fuel, as well as a clock system that failed to activate. Along with the device were pamphlets with “anarchist slogans,” as the police told the press.

On 27 February 2017, an attack was registered in the Providencia district in front of the UDI, it did not leave injuries but slight material damage. On 31 October of the same year an explosive was deactivated by the Carabineros in the vicinity of the Party for Democracy offices in the district of Ñuñoa. In its place, several pamphlets with political slogans were found. The next day an explosive was deactivated in front of the Christian Democratic Party offices.

On 10 December 2017, an explosive device was deactivated in the vicinity of the Radical Party and Socialist Party offices, leaving no people injured.

On 3 November 2018, they claimed responsibility for a simulated device in a Transantiago, but it was not picked up by the press. On 3 December 2018, an improvised device detonated at a BancoEstado branch in Las Condes, leaving considerable damage to infrastructure. At first it was thought that it was a failed robbery, but two anarchist groups (Núcleos Antagónicos de la Nueva Guerrilla Urbana and Grupo de Ataque Antipatriarcal Claudia López) claimed responsibility for carrying out the attack simultaneously. The authorities are still investigating. Days later an improvised explosive device destroyed a bank branch in Las Condes, leaving no injuries. At the scene of the attack, leaflets were left alluding to the death of Sebastián Oversluij, an anarchist militant who was assassinated five years before during a bank robbery. Days later, two anarchist groups affirmed that the joint effort to carry out the attack was directed at Chilean bankers and the bourgeoisie. On 31 December, a bomb was defused when militants tried to detonate it in a BancoEstado branch, in the district of Vitacura. The police coordinated the area and the sappers of the Carabineros de Chile deactivated the IED. Days later, the cell "Friends of Gunpowder" claimed the incident.

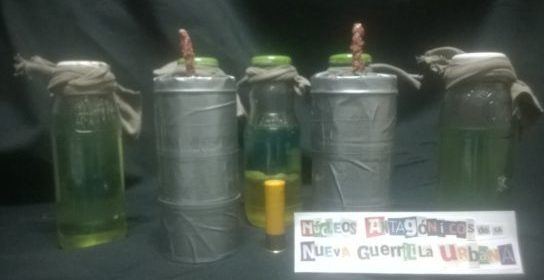
Pipe bombs and incendiary elements used by the NANGU, before using them in a demonstration commemorating the 1973 Chilean coup d'état.

It was not until July 2019 that they claimed to have set fire to some cars during a march called by teachers on 20 June, reporting some isolated incidents. In a statement released in August 2019, they claimed to have been in clashes with the police during demonstrations against the Meeting of Presidents of South America on 22 March, rejecting the presence of Jair Bolsonaro and the other leaders, and also being present during the commemoration of the Day of the Young Combatant and other riots during the month of April. On 20 April, militants set fire to a Transantiago bus in the Quinta Normal district in honor of the guerrillas Erick Rodríguez and Iván Palacios, as well as having participated in violent demonstrations and barricades during the months of May to August. On 4 August, militants threatened a Transantiago driver in the Pedro Aguirre Cerda district, setting the bus on fire and carrying out some shots into the air. No arrests were recorded. On 11 September, during the protests commemorating the 1973 coup in Chile, members of the NANGU attacked and set fire to a car launches gases belonging to the Chilean Police, this in the Peñalolén district. The attack left the unit seriously damaged, as well as three police officers injured, including a captain, a second sergeant and a second corporal. The authorities declared that they still had no detainees for the attack, and the group claimed responsibility for the attack three days later. On 30 September 2019, some cells separated from the group, without giving reasons. During the 2019–2020 Chilean protests the group released an online book called "On Insurrectional Ghosts and False Flags" where they describe the multiple causes of the conflict, which goes beyond the fare increase of the Metropolitan Mobility Network, showing some protests as background. They also stated that members and former members of the NANGU participated in various groups and First Line blocs, arguing that initiatives such as the Anti-Barricade Law are a sample of repression compared to operations such as Operation Gladio, the military dictatorship, and other international examples, demonstrating that popular insurrection was a way out of increasingly authoritarian state policies.

== See also ==
- Anarchism in Chile
