= Hunter TR-12 =

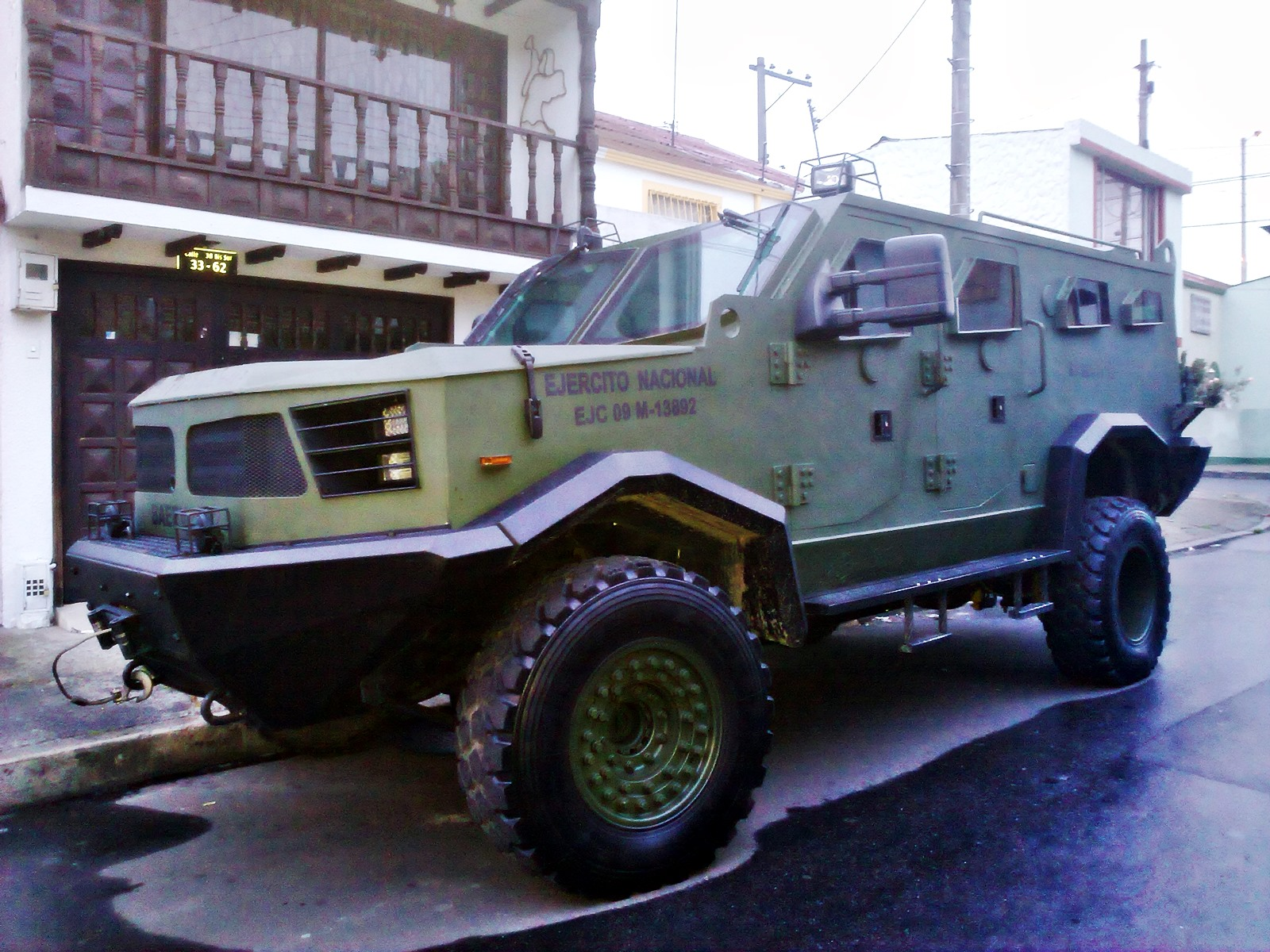
- Hunter TR-12 of the Colombian Army
- Type: Infantry mobility vehicle with MRAP capabilities
- Place of origin: Colombia

Service history
- In service: 2012–present
- Used by: See Operators
- Wars: Colombian conflict

Production history
- Manufacturer: Armor International

Specifications
- Mass: 9,000 kg (20,000 lb)
- Crew: 2
- Passengers: 10
- Armor: Level B6 Standard EN 1063
- Main armament: Machine gun or Grenade launcher
- Engine: 6,700 cc V8 Turbo Diesel engine
- Transmission: Automatic 6 speed
- Suspension: 4×4 wheeled
- Operational range: +900km

The Hunter TR-12 is a multi-purpose infantry mobility vehicle designed to carry troops to dangerous areas.

== History ==
The Hunter TR-12 was first unveiled at the 2011 Worldwide Exhibition of Internal State Security Milipol in Paris, France. In November 2012, the Colombian Army selected it as the winner of its Meteor MRAP. There is a project for 1500 vehicles tender. The first Hunter TR-12 was delivered in December 2012, and a second was delivered in July 2013.

== Design ==
The Hunter TR-12's crew compartment is a monohull mounted on an independent chassis. It provides Level B6 (Standard EN 1063) protection levels, offering protection against rifle fire and ambushes. Each side of the hull has equipped two small armored windows and firing ports. Two doors are mounted at the front of each side of the crew compartment with small window and firing port.

The Hunter TR-12 can mount a 360 degree roof turret with an M60 machine gun, an M2HB-QCB machine gun, or a Mk 19 grenade launcher. Weapons can be fitted to a remote weapons station. Its 4×4 chassis and runflat tires can handle off-road terrain. The vehicle has a crew of two and is capable of carrying 10 troops. The standard configuration has one spare wheel at the rear and comes with search lights and a thermal camera. It can be optionally fitted with blackout lights, a snorkel, and front winch.

== Operators ==
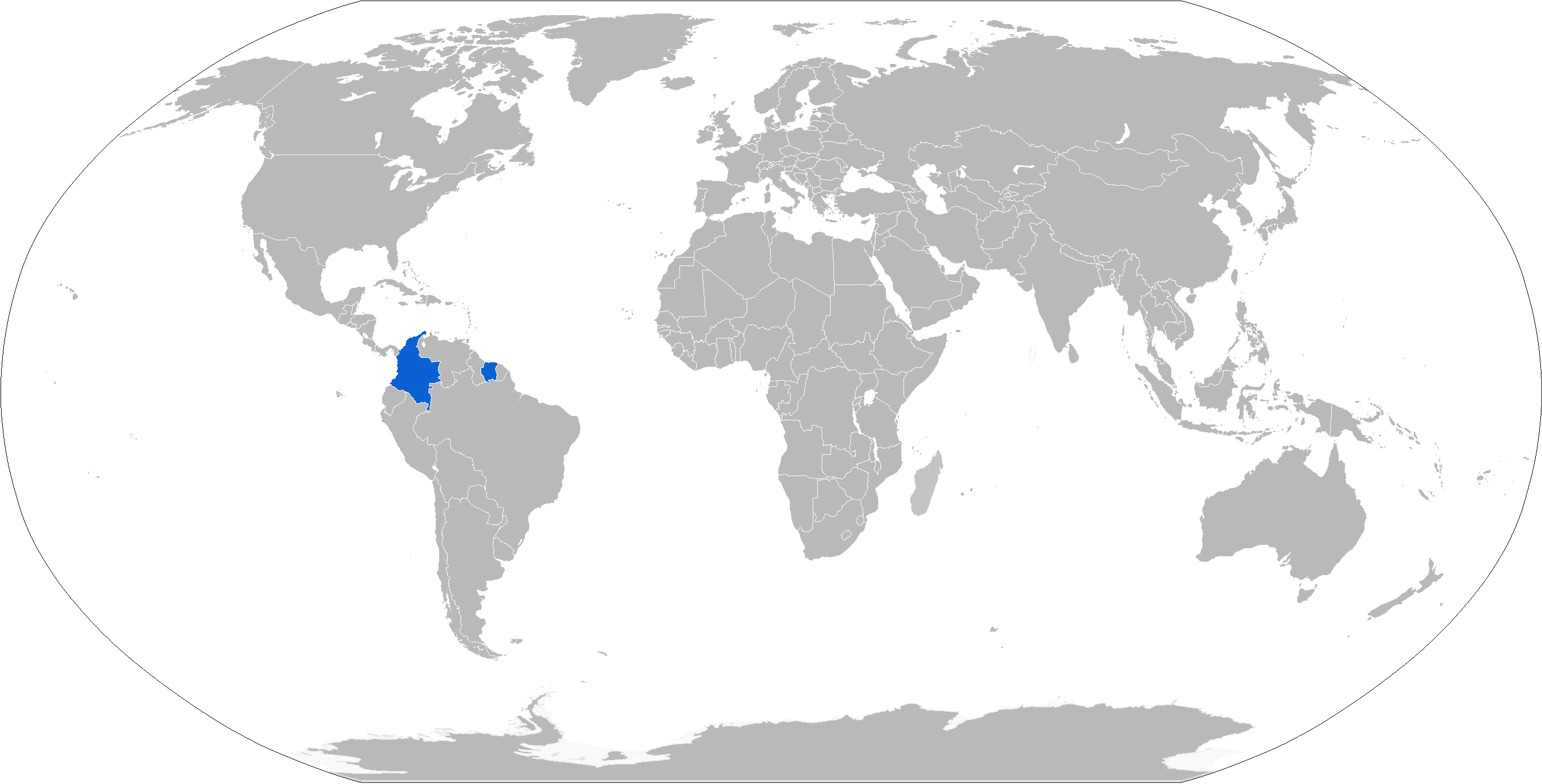
Map with TR-12 operators in blue

- Chile
  - Chilean Army
  - Carabineros de Chile GOPE
- Colombia
  - National Army of Colombia
  - National Police of Colombia
- Suriname
  - Suriname National Army
