= José Domingo Gómez Rojas =

Chilean poet and anarchist

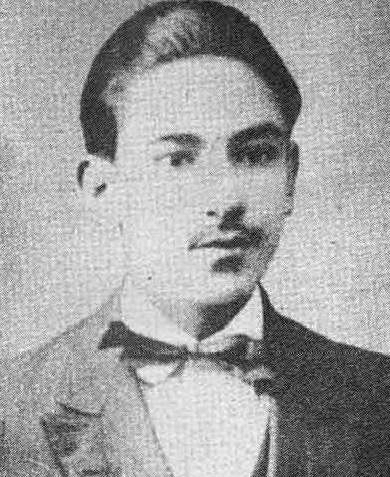
- Born: 19 June 1896; Santiago, Chile
- Died: 29 September 1920 (aged 24)
- Education: Manuel Barros Borgoño Secondary School; University of Chile
- Occupation: poet
- Writing career
- Language: Spanish

José Domingo Gómez Rojas (Santiago, 19 June 1896 - 29 September 1920) was a Chilean poet and anarchist. He is also known for being the only victim of Don Ladislao's War.

== Biography ==
Gómez Rojas was born into a modest family and raised by his mother, having been abandoned by both his father and stepfather at an early age. He was born on Calle Agustinas, close to the centre of Santiago de Chile, and the small family later relocated to Calle San Diego. He studied at Manuel Barros Borgoño Secondary School.

He took great interest in poetry from a young age, and wrote the greater part of his works between 1912 and 1915. During his early life, Gómez Rojas was linked to Protestant Christian sects that opposed the Catholic church's doctrinal and authoritarian hold over Chilean society. However, he soon became interested in "intellectual anarchism" and his writing began to show the influences of Nietzsche and D'Annunzio. This sometimes conflicting progression in the work of a poet who has been described as "consistent and almighty" is revealed in Ópera Omnia, which remained unpublished until some years ago. Eventually, during the late 1910s, he became influenced by the aesthetic and artistic avant-garde and became inclined towards writing elegies as an attempt to transcend modernist themes.

He participated in various artistic and intellectual groups of 1910s Chile, namely: Los Caimanes, Los Diez, and Los Inmortales, the latter made up of the popular playwright Antonio Acevedo Hernández, and his closest friends: Manuel Rojas and José Santos González Vera, whom he encouraged to write from an early age. Time would reveal Manuel Rojas and González Vera as some of the best Chilean prose writers of the 20th century, both receiving national literature prizes. Following his untimely death, both wrote about the works and personality of their departed friend.

Cry for Mercy (excerpt)
In this prison where they've taken me,
where an unjust law keeps us prisoner:
I have imagined tombs where judges and magistrates rotted
and now are nothing but dust on this earth (...)
they believed themselves the hand of God over Earth,
his divine wrath, his fire, his burning whip,
today they lie forgotten,
in terrible slumber
dust, silence, shadow,
Oblivion! Oblivion! Oblivion!
José Domingo Gómez Rojas, (during his imprisonment)

The only one of his works to have been published during his lifetime was Rebeldías líricas (1913), in the midst of the social upheaval that was demanding change in Chile's oligarchic society. In 1916, he adopted the pseudonym Daniel Vásquez, which would, however, only last until the following year, when his identity was revealed in the Los Diez magazine by Pedro Prado. The “Selva Lírica” group also featured six of his texts in an anthology published in the same year. They describe him as:

[...] A visionary of things mysterious and otherworldly... His brief poems carry transcendental ideas expressed with a brilliance that is only reinforced by the grandeur of his style.

— Extract from literary critique in “Selva lírica” Magazine.

As a student at the University of Chile's Pedagogical Institute and School of Law, Gómez Rojas participated in the University of Chile Student Federation, but maintained a more militant commitment to the Asamblea de la Juventud Radical (Radical Youth Assembly), a political organisation that served as a point of convergence for many young Chilean revolutionaries of the day. At the same time, he also maintained links with the socialist Chilean Workers' Federation (FOCH) and the Chilean arm of the anarchist IWW.

== Imprisonment and death ==
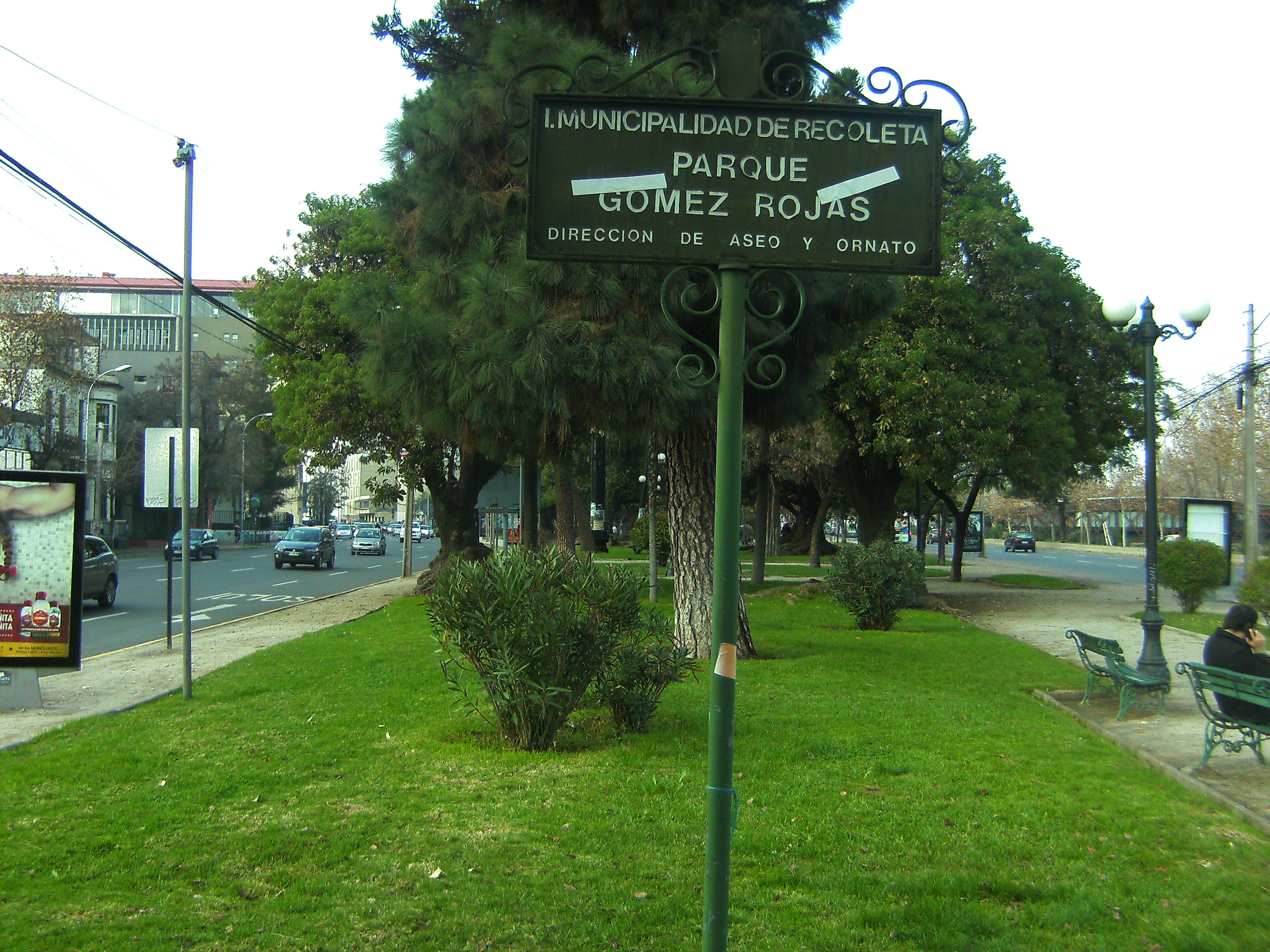
Square as seen from the West

In July 1920, after the National Workers' Food Assembly (AOAN) called for nationwide action, tensions in the country reached boiling point. Known as Las Marchas de Hambre (The Hunger Marches) these actions intended to demonstrate popular support for changes to legislation proposed by the AOAN and its commissions after over two months' deliberation. So great was the support on the streets, that then President of Chile, Juan Luis Sanfuentes, was obliged to receive delegates of the AOAN, who presented the proposals to him with the expression “He aquí la voluntad del pueblo” (This is the will of the people), and a warning of civil disobedience across the country were these not approved within 15 days. Sanfuentes made a courteous show of accepting the proposals, but the next day named Ladislao Errázuriz as Minister of the Interior, who, in a conspiracy later referred to satirically as Don Ladislao's War, would mobilise troops to the border and spread the rumour of an imminent war with Peru and Bolivia. This pretext allowed Sanfuentes to declare martial law. The cities were then taken over by the military, “subversive” students and workers were put on trial, their leaders tried, beaten, extradited and imprisoned (among them Luis Emilio Recabarren) and, on the 21st of July, the headquarters of the University of Chile Student Federation was attacked and destroyed by soldiers and members of the aristocratic Conservative Youth. José Domingo Gómez Rojas was sent to prison by judge José Astorquiza Líbano, where he was subjected to constant torture and harassment. Under these circumstances, his mental health began to deteriorate, and he was later held in solitary confinement, where his body also began to suffer the effects of abuse and imprisonment.

After first being detained in the penitentiary, he was later transferred to La Casa de Orates, the country's first and most notorious mental institution, where, after some time, he was driven to insanity by an undiagnosed bout of meningitis. He died on 29 September 1920, and his funeral was attended by over 50,000 people, a poignant demonstration of the huge political, economic and social crisis to which the country had been subjected by the dominant oligarchy, and of the nationwide support for the demands made by the Marchas del Hambre, a process which transformed José Domingo Gómez Rojas into a symbol. His poem Cry for Mercy, written during his incarceration, was read aloud and circulated during his funeral and became a symbol for anarchist and pacifist groups opposing the country's ruling oligarchy.

== Tributes ==
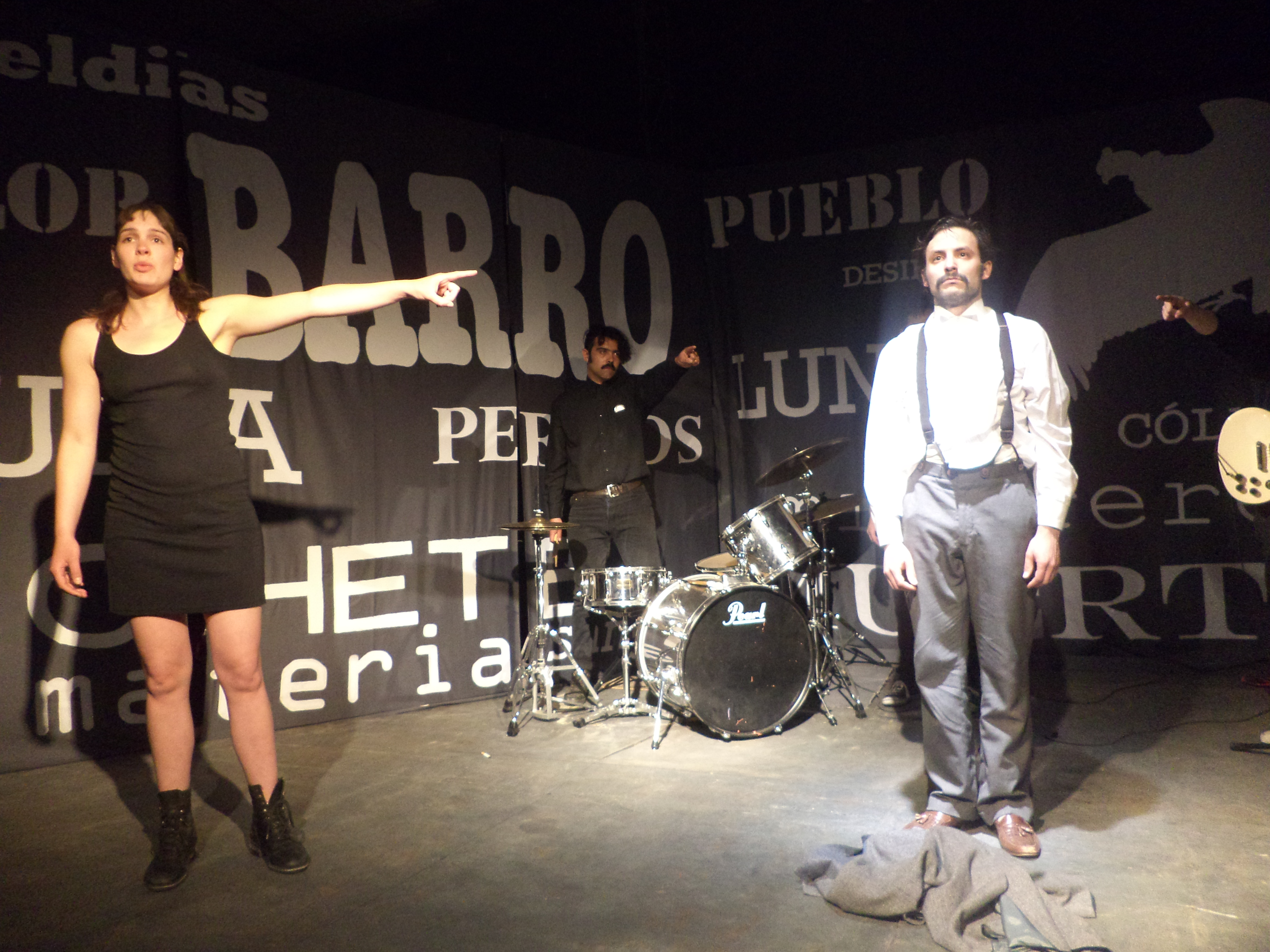
Play: ¿Quién conoce a Gómez Rojas?

- In 1940, a square bearing his name was dedicated outside the University of Chile's school of law. This was later changed to “Pope John Paul II Square” in 2007, and an attempt was also made to erect a statue of the late pontiff on the site, but came under heavy criticism from members of the public, architects and urban design experts alike, and was ultimately rejected by the National Monuments Council of Chile (Consejo de Monumentos Nacionales).
- Some cultural and political groups bear his name.
- Chilean theatre company Teatro Fresa Salvaje staged a punk opera called El Montaje. ¿Quién conoce a José Domingo Gómez Rojas? (The Set up. Who knows José Domingo Gómez Rojas?) and stated it was intended to “reflect on the student movement and the political traps set for it by the state.”
- Canal Ateo Chileno (the Chilean Atheist Channel, or CACH) referred to him as “a true martyr” in a documentary released in 2016.

== Bibliography ==
- Antonio Acevedo Hernández. Memorias de un autor teatral, Santiago, Nascimento, 1982.
- Fabio Moraga Valle and Carlos Vega Delgado. José Domingo Gómez Rojas, VIda y Obra, Punta Arenas, ATELI, 1997.
- Fabio Moraga Valle. "Muchachos casi silvestres". La Federación de Estudiantes y el movimiento estudiantil chileno, 1906-1936, Santiago, University of Chile Editions, 2007.
- José Domingo Gómez Rojas. Rebeldías Líricas, Santiago, 1913.
- Andrés Sabella. Popularización de Gómez Rojas, Santiago, 1939

== Works ==
- Rebeldías líricas, 1913.
- Ópera omnia, (1915) in: Fabio Moraga and Carlos Vega, José Domingo Gómez Rojas. Vida y obra, Punta Arenas, Ateli, 1997.
- Elegías, 1935 (published posthumously).
