= Jean Marc Rouillan Armed and Heartless Columns =

Chilean urban guerrilla

- Columnas Armadas y Desalmadas Jean Marc Rouillan
- Dates active: March 18, 2008–2012
- Country: Chile
- Active regions: Santiago Metropolitan Area
- Ideology: Anarcho-communism; Anti-patriotism; Anti-authoritarianism; Illegalism; Individualist anarchism Insurrectionary anarchism Post-Marxism
- Political position: Far-left
- Status: Dissolved

The Jean Marc Rouillan Armed and Soulless Columns (Spanish: Columnas Armadas y Desalmadas Jean Marc Rouillan, CAD-JMR) was an urban guerrilla group created in 2008 in the Santiago Metropolitan Area, responsible for some attacks with explosives. The group gained notoriety when it was investigated by the authorities in relation to the "bomb case".

== Background ==
Since the mid-2000s, the Santiago Metropolitan Area and other cities suffered several attacks with homemade explosives (commonly fire extinguishers filled with gunpowder fillers or sometimes with explosives such as ANFO, TNT or TATP), including banks (approximately one third of the bombs detonated in national and international banks), police stations, police and army barracks, churches, embassies, the headquarters of political parties, offices of public and private companies, courts and government buildings.

It was common for the names of these cells to be relevant anarchists or guerrillas killed during the 20th century such as Efraín Plaza Olmedo, Jean Marc Rouillan, Jorge Tamayo Gavilán, Leon Czolgosz, Miguel Arcángel Roscigna, Severino Di Giovanni, using dates such as March 29 (Day of the Young Combatant) and September 11 (the commemoration of the 1973 Chilean coup d'état) and other dates such as the death of guerrillas (such as Mauricio Morales, or Johnny Cariqueo) have been days when it is common for these groups to commit attacks.

== Attacks ==
The group's first attack was on March 18, 2008, militants left a homemade explosive in a branch of the Banco de Crédito e Inversiones in the Providencia commune, causing material damage. The next day the group claimed responsibility for the attack in an email that was sent to Radio Bio Bio, and in this it justified the explosion as support for the Mapuche cause, the victims of police brutality and as a threat to the Carabineros, in addition to having made a broad call for mobilization for the Day of the Young Combatant, the date on which insurrectionary groups commemorate the death of the brothers Rafael and Eduardo Vergara Toledo.

== See also ==
- Anarchism in Chile
