= 2014 Santiago subway bombing =

Fire extinguisher bombing in Santiago, Chile

- Location: 33°24′51.36″S 70°35′4.74″W; Santiago, Santiago Metropolitan Region, Chile
- Date: 8 September 2014; 13:53
- Target: Escuela Militar metro station
- Weapon: Fire extinguisher bomb
- Deaths: 0
- Injuries: 14
- Perpetrator: Juan Alexis Flores Riquelme
- Motive: Insurrectionary anarchism
- Convictions: Terrorist act of placing, activating, and detonating an explosive device; Possession of an explosive device; Minor assault (6 counts); Property damage
- Sentence: 23 years' imprisonment

On 8 September 2014, a fire extinguisher bomb exploded in the Escuela Militar metro station in Santiago, Chile, injuring 14 people, several seriously. Self-radicalized anarchist Juan Alexis Flores Riquelme, along with his then-girlfriend and another friend, were arrested for the bombing, though the latter two were later acquitted. He was later sentenced to 23 years' imprisonment.

== Background ==
Since 2005, more than 200 explosive related incidents have been reported to have occurred. In 2009, an improvised explosive device exploded in the bag of a 27-year-old homeless man, killing him instantly. It was later determined the man was plotting a subway bombing, but the device had gone off ahead of time.

Since the beginning of 2014, there have been 29 bombs uncovered in Chile. Most of the bombs were filled with gunpowder but did not explode and the few that did, did not cause any injuries. In August, President Michelle Bachelet appointed a special prosecutor to investigate the threat of future bombings.

Santiago has experienced 10 bombings in 2014, and over 200 between 2004 and 2014, with few casualties. Many of the incidents, which mostly occur at night in empty streets, are claimed by groups giving themselves names associated with anarchism, others may be carried out by anti-American groups, indigenous rights groups, or anti-capitalism groups. Most of the explosive devices are small, designed to make noise, although capable of injuring or killing.

== Attack ==
The explosion occurred during the lunch hour rush in the subway station, with the explosive device, consisting of a fire extinguisher filled with gunpowder on a timer left inside of a trash can, going of at 13:53. Fourteen people were injured, including a 61-year-old woman who had to have her finger amputated due to shrapnel damage, along with others who were hospitalized due to serious injuries.

== Aftermath ==
After the attack, subway service was temporarily stopped. When it resumed, the station remained closed. The Carabineros de Chile responded with a bomb squad and special investigators in order to gather evidence, and the national government requested the assistance of foreign security agencies in identifying the bombers. In response to the new attacks, the national government announced that they would be invoking Chile's controversial Anti-terror law which allows for longer detention without charge, the use of wiretaps, and confidential witnesses. The bombing also raised concerns about whether more explosions would occur in the days nearing the anniversary of the beginning of the dictatorship of Augusto Pinochet. On September 9, the police announced that they had one suspect that had been captured on security footage placing the bomb.

== Legal aftermath ==
On 22 September 2014, two men and one woman were arrested in a police raid related to the incident. The suspects identified as Juan Alexis Flores Riquelme, Guillermo Cristóbal Durán Méndez and Nataly Antonieta Casanova Muñoz. According to the authorities gunpowder and other bomb making materials were found in the suspects' homes, with Juan Flores being the mastermind behind the organization. The Public Ministry, through the regional prosecutor of the South Zone, Raúl Guzmán and the prosecutor with exclusive dedication, Christian Toledo, found a Tarjeta bip! (a plastic card used as a means of payment to use public transport in Santiago) among the belongings of the accused. Its recorded usage history, along with security camera footage, was used as evidence against the accused.

The suspects were officially charged with the crime on September 23. Despite the evidence presented by the authorities, all of them denied any involvement in the incident.

On March 15, 2018, the Sixth Oral Criminal Trial Court of Santiago sentenced Juan Flores Riquelme to a total of 23 years' imprisonment; 15 years for one count of the terrorist acts of planting and detonating an explosive device and 8 years for one count of possession of an explosive device, six counts of minor assault, and one count of property damage. The other two defendants were acquitted due to lack of evidence.

=== Imprisonment ===
In January 2019, prison gendarmes discovered Flores, along with seven other prisoners, attempted to escape the Colina II Penitentiary Center, where he was being held at, by "reactivating" a 40-meter deep unfinished tunnel from a previous, unsuccessful, escape attempt. In response, he was held in solitary confinement for 30 days and later transferred to the Special High Security Units Prison of Santiago, one of the only two high-security prisons in Chile, where he is currently serving his sentence.

Flores is set for release in 2037.

== Subsequent bombings ==
Between 9 and 10 September 2014, two improvised bombs exploded in the Chilean resort town of Vina del Mar. On the night of September 9, a bomb detonated inside a supermarket, injuring one woman. The bomb consisted of a plastic bottle filled with aluminum and hydrochloric acid, was placed inside a trash can. The bomb exploded after the local janitor attempted to empty the trash can. The second device detonated inside the Open Plaza mall's bathroom.

On 25 September 2014, a home made explosive device detonated inside a man's bag while he was carrying it. The victim was later identified as 29-year-old Sergio Landskron Silva. In the aftermath of the explosion Silva remained engulfed in flames while laying on the sidewalk. Bystanders and policemen failed to assist the victim, fearing that a second explosive device remained in his bag. Silva was pronounced dead several minutes after being transferred to a hospital. According to Silva's brother, he has been living on the streets for a prolonged period of time, while struggling with drug addiction. Silva was allegedly planning to plant the bomb in the Yungay neighborhood of Santiago.

== Reactions ==
- Chile – President Michelle Bachelet called the attack "A cowardly act because it has as its objective to hurt people, create fear and even kill innocent people" The government spokesman, Alvaro Elizalde, called the attack an "act of terrorism" and vowed that the Chilean government would capture those responsible.

== See also ==
- Terrorism in Chile
- List of terrorist incidents
