= José Santos González Vera =

Chilean writer (1897–1970)

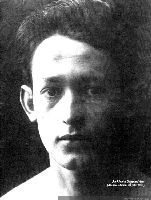

José Santos González Vera (2 November 1897 – 27 February 1970) was a Chilean anarchist writer. He won the Chilean National Prize for Literature in 1950.

== Biography ==
González Vera was born on 2 November 1897 in San Francisco del Monte, a small town southern Santiago, the capital city of Chile.

At the age of 13, he started to work: he was a painter apprentice, tailor shop assistant, bargain sale's assistant, smelting worker, hairdresser, shoeshine boy, secretary in a butcher's society, commission agent, cashier and trolley's money collector in Valparaiso.

González Vera became interested in literature when he was 20. He read the work of Maxim Gorki and Peter Kropotkin, one of the most important theorist of anarchism. Right after that, he started writing to expand the ideology of "giving a righter order to society".
