= Anarchism in Chile =

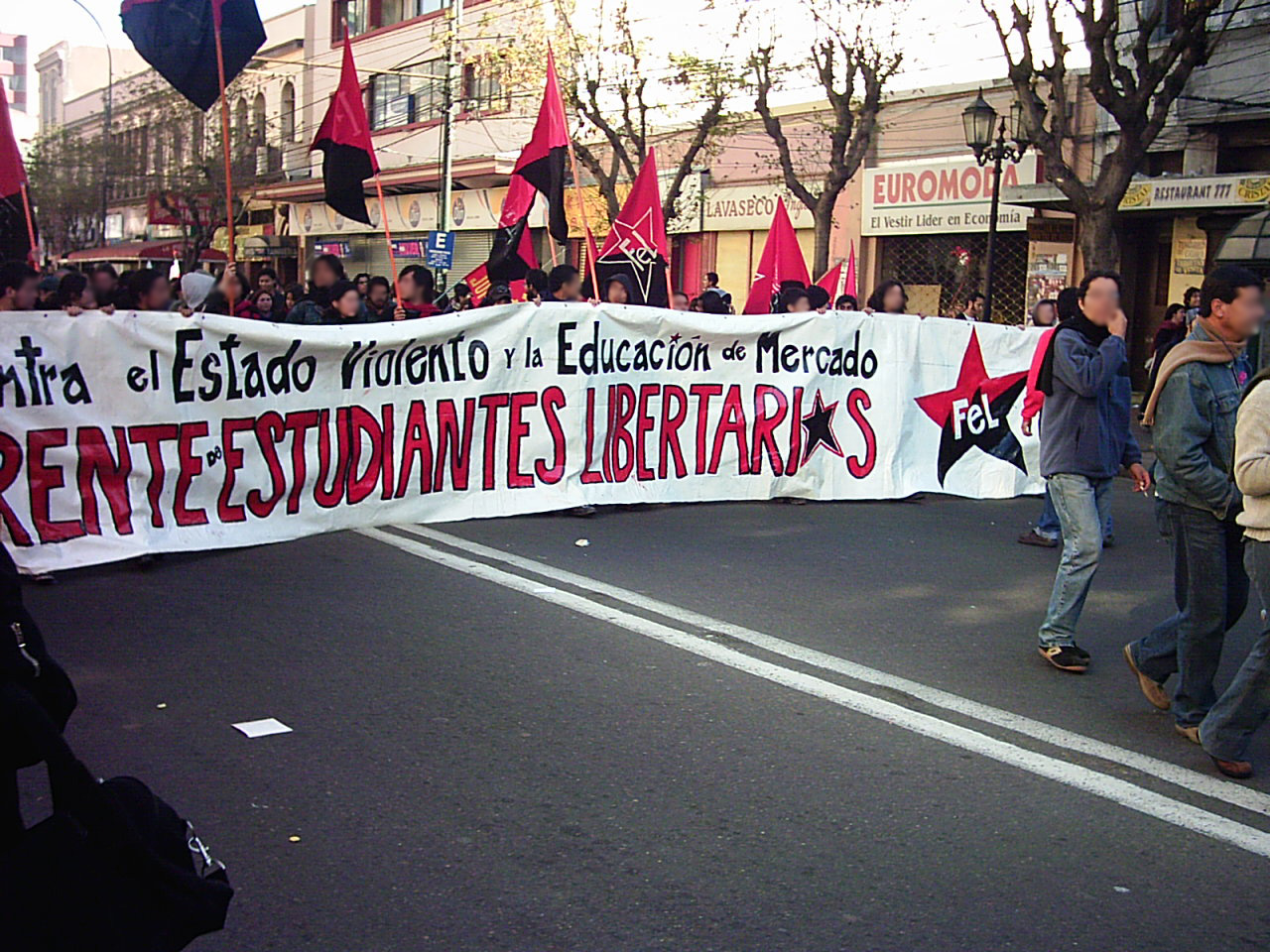
Chilean anarchists

The anarchist movement in Chile emerged from European immigrants, followers of Mikhail Bakunin affiliated with the International Workingmen's Association, who contacted Manuel Chinchilla, a Spaniard living in Iquique. Their influence could be perceived at first within the labour unions of typographers, painters, builders and sailors. During the first decades of the 20th century, anarchism had a significant influence on the labour movement and intellectual circles of Chile. Some of the most prominent Chilean anarchists were: the poet Carlos Pezoa Véliz, the professor Dr. Juan Gandulfo, the syndicalist workers Luis Olea, Magno Espinoza, Alejandro Escobar y Carballo, Ángela Muñoz Arancibia, Juan Chamorro, Armando Triviño and Ernesto Miranda, the teacher Flora Sanhueza, and the writers José Domingo Gómez Rojas, Fernando Santiván, José Santos González Vera and Manuel Rojas. At the moment, anarchist groups are experiencing a comeback in Chile through various student collectives, affinity groups, community and cultural centres, and squatting.

== Early years (1850–1921) ==
During the French Revolution of 1848, a number of Chilean radicals visited Paris, where they became acquainted with the mutualism of Pierre-Joseph Proudhon and the Christian socialism of Félicité de La Mennais. Upon their return to Chile in 1850, Francisco Bilbao and Santiago Arcos established the Equality Society (Spanish: Sociedad de la Igualidad, SI), a mutual aid society which was suppressed before the end of the year by the Chilean authorities. Other mutualist societies were founded throughout the 1850s, culminating in 1862 with the formation of The Union (Spanish: La Union), which became highly influential among artisans in many Chilean cities, providing free health care and organising workshops for the unemployed. The mutualist movement quickly formed a counterculture in Chile, believing that capitalism could be replaced peacefully through institutions of dual power.

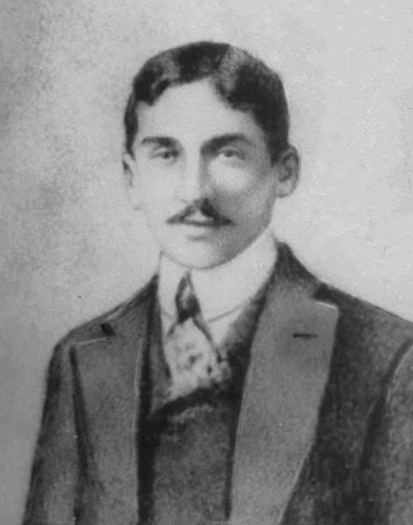
Carlos Pezoa Véliz

Anarchist propaganda began circulating in Chile around 1880, consisting of literary works arriving from Spain and Argentina. The first libertarian newspaper, El Oprimido, was published in 1893 in Valparaíso, followed by others such as: El Ácrata, La Luz, La Revuelta, La Batalla, El Surco, Acción Directa and others. La Batalla was published continually for a longer period of time, between 1912 and 1926. There were also various newspapers published by general unions with anarchist tendencies, such as: El Siglo XX, La Imprenta (typographers) and El Marítimo in Antofagasta (sailors).

As far as anarchist literature was concerned, the publishing house Editorial Lux distinguished itself by printing books by Chilean and European anarchists such as Manuel Márquez and José Domingo Gómez Rojas. Among other notable militants were the typographer Enrique Arenas from Iquique, founder of a number of anarchist newspapers, as well as Luis Olea, Alejandro Magno Espinosa and Alejandro Escobar y Carballo, the driving force behind several general unions.

General unions engaged in conflict with the older and newer benefit societies, which had been in existence since the mid-nineteenth century, and which they considered incapable of defending the interests of the working class. The newspaper El Faro criticised the old benefit societies, branding them as "the mutualist mummies that have been eternally vegetating without any sort of practical profit, or the economical development of which they should be responsible as the developers of all kinds of social wealth". The newspaper Siglo XX had a similar position on the matter: "It is essential within these societies to assure the payment of the quotas of their members, with no care whatsoever given to whether the individual actually has the resources to meet them or not (...) These societies are powerless in defending the privileges and the interests of the proletariat".

This context of a growing working-class movement set the basis for the emergence of co-operatives, which adopted a strictly defensive position despite their anarcho-syndicalist inspiration. The first co-operative was founded by dockworkers in Iquique on 1 May 1900, and later ones emerged in Antofagasta, Chañaral and Copiapó. In 1904 the first National Convention of Co-operatives was organised in Santiago, with the participation of 20 000 members from 15 organisations. The defensive character of these organisations meant that most co-operatives were under the control of socialists and Marxists, particularly members of the Democrat Party. Many of these went on to form the Workers' Federation of Chile (FOCH).

=== Demonstrations ===
One of the first conflicts triggered by the anarchists was "the Great Boatmen Strike" of 1890, which took place in Iquique, Antofagasta, Valparaíso, Concepción and other smaller ports. A strike broke out in Valparaíso in 1903 at the South American Steamboat Company (CSV), which was suppressed violently, causing the workers to react by setting fire to the company's headquarters.

In 1905, a spontaneous workers' movement took place in Santiago, encouraged by the anarchists. It came to be known as the Red Week. The movement started as a consequence of an unjustified repression by the police of a rally protesting against taxes on imported meat. The fierce repression and clashes with the police resulted in the deaths of around 200 workers. The indignation of the workers grew stronger and stronger, and most of the labour unions went on general strike. The government declared a state of siege and called upon the army to suppress the movement. The crowds attempted to take over the governmental palace, and even though they did not succeed, the city remained under their control.

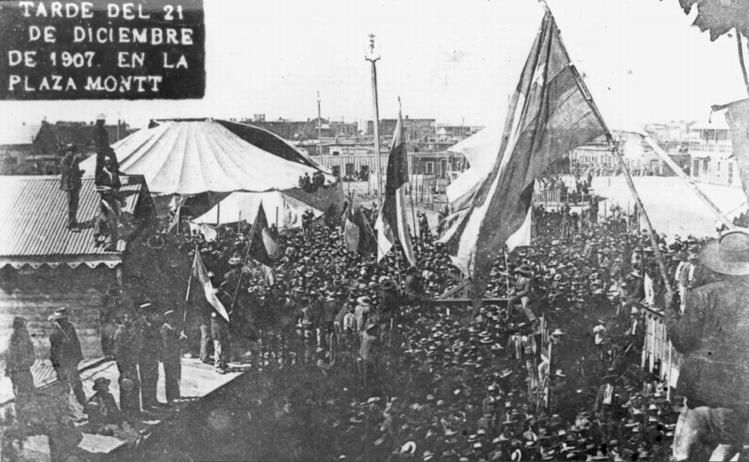
A march prior to the Santa María School Massacre

The response of the government was to increase the repression and to persecute the revolutionary anarchists and syndicalists who were the leaders of the movement. However, anarchist activity was still on the rise. The anarchist newspaper El Alba condemned the acts in an edition released in October 1905: "The people have been assassinated with rage and malice by the young horde of the bourgeoisie. More than 500 citizens have been murdered vilely and cowardly, and more than 1500 were injured".

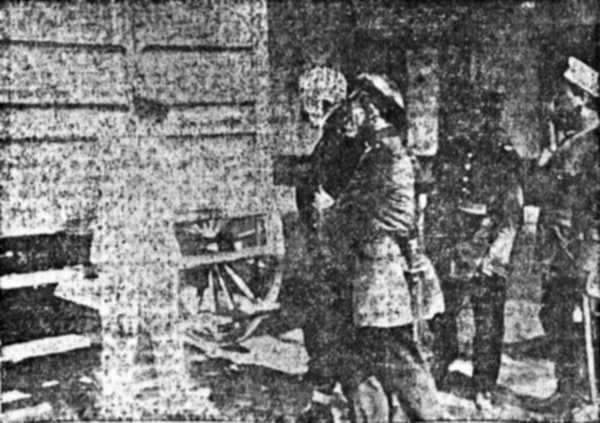
Antonio Ramón Ramón, the "avenger" of the Santa María School Massacre

In 1906 a general strike was declared in Antofagasta, run by the railroad workers. On 21 December 1907, the strike aimed at improving the pay of the saltpetre (nitrate) miners in Iquique ended in a massacre carried out by the authorities, known as the Santa María School massacre. It was there that the army fired into the crowd that had gathered in Santa María square, killing around 3000 people, among them workers, women, and children. Spanish anarchist Antonio Ramón attempted to assassinate Roberto Silva Renard in revenge.

== "The idea" (1921–1931) ==
After the Russian Revolution (which was regarded with distrust by most anarchists from the very beginning), the divide between anarchists and Marxists deepened. Their cohabitation within general unions came to an end, and the moderate and reformist socialists took over the Workers' Federation of Chile (FOCH).

5 September 1924 the civic and military coup d'état was repudiated by the Chilean left wing. Nevertheless, the restorative military movement of January 1925 was supported by the socialist and communist forces. The anarchists and the organizations who exercised their influence decided to stay back and not trust the military.

In 1925 there was a rent strike in Santiago. The government decided to form a "Housing Board" to solve conflicts between tenants and owners, an arrangement that was supported by the communists. The anarcho-syndicalists rejected this arrangement, which they believed had as an objective to divide the strike movement. The anarchists founded a new worker's organization the same year. The Chilean Workers' Regional Federation (known by its abbreviation in Spanish FORCH), affiliated to the International Workers' Association (AIT): taking as a model the Argentinean Regional Worker's Association (FORA).

In January 1927 a general strike took place in Santiago and Valparaíso. A month after general Ibáñez demoted president Arturo Alessandri with a new coup d'état. The 1930s crisis hit the population hard which continued to strike in the streets. In response, the dictatorship suppressed the workers' organizations and disarticulated them almost completely.

== Modern syndicalism (1931–1957) ==
Following the end of the dictatorship in 1931, the communists and socialists founded the Worker's Confederation of Chile (CTCH). The anarchists created their own General Confederation of Workers (CGT). However, the legalization and institutionalization of the reformist union, harsh repression towards the anarchists, and the certain disorganization among the libertarians weakened anarchists' popularity, which would start falling during the start of the decade, with a slight upturn during the years of the Spanish Revolution, until becoming of little significance in the 1940s. The syndicalist prominence had remained in the hands of the reformist syndicalism of the socialists, communists, and the Christian Democrats.

== "Political anarchism" (1957–1973) ==
In 1958, Law No. 12927, dictated on the "Inner Security of the State", amended on several occasions and prevailing to the present day, sanctions any act of insurrectionist or revolutionary nature.

== Repression under Pinochet (1973–1990) ==
After the coup d'état of general Augusto Pinochet, a repressive wave was triggered against all the left wing, including the few individual anarchists who still existed.

In 1975, the Committee of Defense of Human rights (CODEH) was reactivated by Clotario Blest and Ernesto Miranda, which would become of vital importance for those persecuted by the dictatorship.

The anarchist affiliation during the dictatorship did not have an organic character, limiting itself to the work of some individuals that contributed to the formation of resistance groups against the dictatorship, especially in universities and population scope. Anarchism as a social movement vanished during those years.

It re-emerged at the end of the 1990s. The Anarchist Communist Unification Congress (CUAC) was formed in 1999, lasting a few years.

== Contemporary anarchism ==
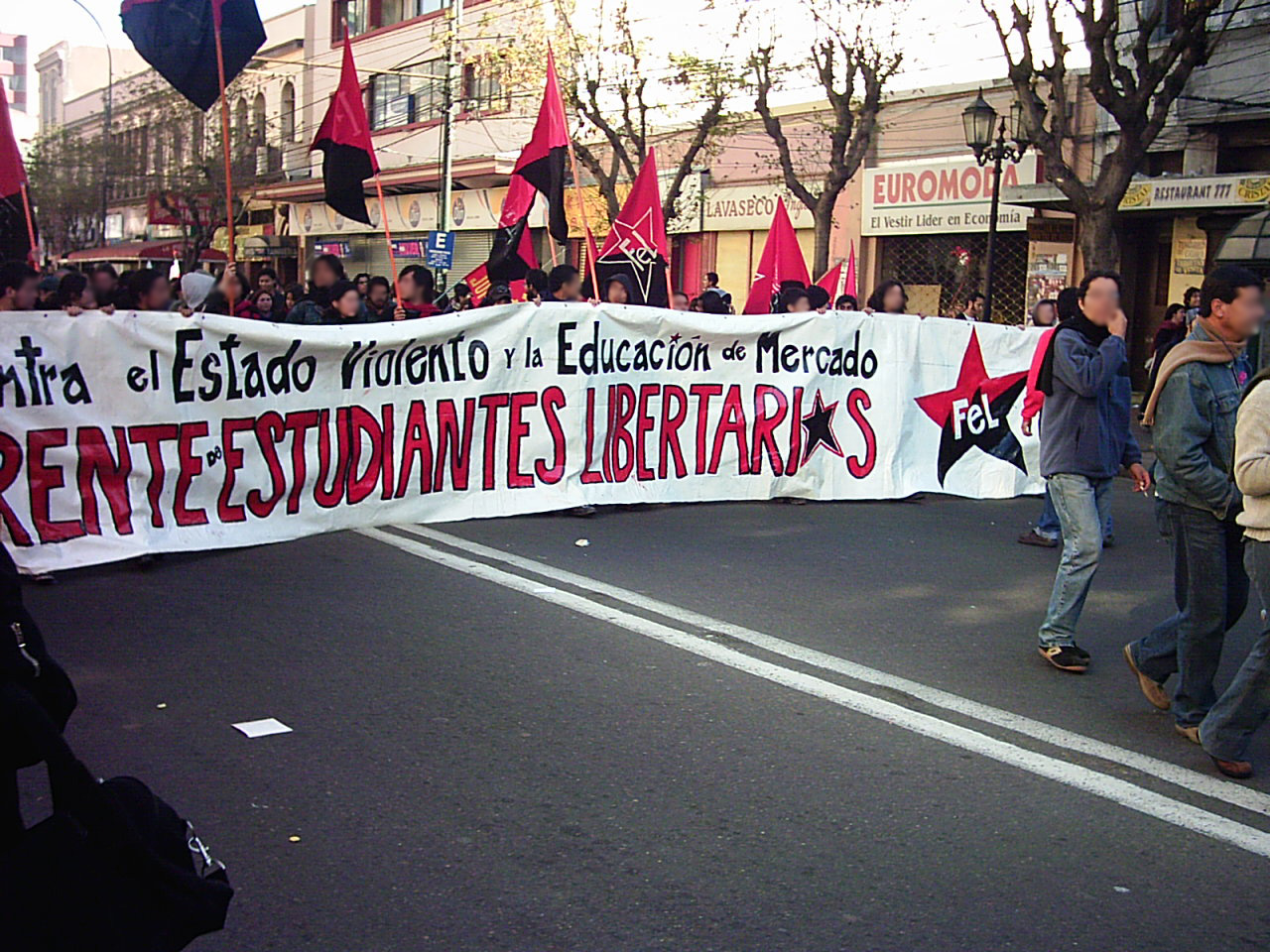
Anarchist march in Valparaíso, 2005

Anarchism as a practice in Chile today is mostly present in the organisation of counter movements and culture. Diverse and decentralised collectives and individuals try to disseminate anarchist ideas and practices through squatting, cultural activities, strikes, and protests.

Several anarchist and libertarian groups initiated a series of congresses in 2010, involving the Libertarian Students Front (FEL) and three organizations that would converge in the Libertarian Communist Federation (FCL). In addition, a group called the Libertarian Communist Organization (OCL) continued the work of CUAC.

In the year 2012 the First Anarchist Book Fair in Santiago took place; it was organized again in 2013, 2014 and 2015. In 2013, with the election of Melissa Sepúlveda as president, anarchists took leadership of the Student Federation of the University of Chile.

One current of the libertarian and anarchist scene, represented by Red Libertaria (Libertarian Network, RL), Socialism and Freedom (SOL) and the Libertarian Left (IL), developed a strategy of “democratic rupture”, aiming to transform mainstream electoral politics, later coming together within the Todos a la Moneda and Broad Front (FA) coalitions. In contrast, another current, more critical of electoral politics, launched the Libertarian Communist Congress that met between the late 2013 and early 2016. Solidaridad, originally named Solidarity, Libertarian Communist Federation, was formed from this second current.

Since 2019, the Anarchist Federation Santiago started organising an anarchist platform in the country's capital. Further, the Mapuche conflict and anti-government protests, most recently the 2019 uprising Estallido social, form part of contemporary representations of anarchist practices, however sometimes without direct reference to anarchist schools of thought. However, the rejection of the current government institutions and the legitimacy of the current constitution, combined with claims for and practices of autonomy and self-organisation form a central pillar of these movements and are inspired by libertarian anarchist principles. Protesting formations like Primera Línea, referred to as "clans" without a central authority, act according to anarchist principles. Similarly, the Mapuche conflict as a struggle for political, economic, and territorial autonomy is supported by other anarchist movements worldwide. The Mapuche struggle, by anarchist principles, fundamentally objects to the state and questions the legitimacy of the Chilean Republic as the successor to the colonial sovereign.

=== Violence ===
One of the first victims in the clashes with the police after the return to democracy was anarchist dance student Claudia López Benaiges, who died due to the action of the state security forces during the disturbances of September 1998. In March 2008, young anarchist Jhonny Cariqueo Yánez died as a result of the beating suffered on 29 March (Young Combatant's Day) while he was under arrest by the Carabineros de Chile in Santiago. That December, another Anarchist and supporter of the Mapuche cause, Juan "Orangu" Cruz Magna, 28, from Santiago, was shot in the neck by strangers when he was spending time at the Mapuche community of Temucuicui.

In May 2009, anarchist Mauricio Morales died in Santiago Centro when the bomb that he was carrying at his back went off near the Gendarmerie School.

At least 200 artifacts have exploded in Chile since 2005. This has led to the formulation of charges against some thirty anarchists. In the vast majority of cases, these devices have been detonated to cause damage to the property of law enforcement and security forces, banks or transnational corporations and, in some cases, they have injured and even killed people.

==== 'Bombs Case' ====
In August 2010, in the so-called "Bombs Case", the squatter house Sacco y Vanzetti was raided and 14 people were arrested, including anarchists, anti-authoritarians and Marxists. After eight months in prison and several months of probation, all of those charged were declared innocent after a long trial that culminated in the Chilean Supreme Court. In October 2012, an appeal was rejected that sought to annul the ruling that acquitted the accused.

In November 2013 Francisco Solar and Mónica Caballero acquitted in the "Bombs Case" were arrested in Spain accused of installing explosive devices at Cathedral-Basilica of Our Lady of the Pillar injuring a woman. They were found guilty of "Terrorist damages" and "terrorist injuries" and sentenced to 12 years in prison.

After their deportation from Spain Francisco Solar and Mónica Caballero were again tried in the so-called 'Bombs Case II' for mailing explosives to former Defence and Interior minister Rodrigo Hinzpeter, as well as to a police station in Huechuraba in 2019 and two explosions against a corporate building in Santiago in 2020. Solar was sentenced to 86 years in prison whilst Caballero was sentenced to 12 as an accomplice.

==== Luciano 'Tortuga' Pitronello ====
In 2012, 22 year old Anarchist Luciano 'Tortuga' Pitronello was sentenced to six years of probation for a bomb attack against a bank. The process had begun with his arrest under charges of terrorism for installing a bomb at a branch of Santander Bank, and ended with him being charged for handling of explosives and the use a false licence plate. The premature detonation of the explosion left Pitronello with multiple wounds, including losing one hand and suffering 'severe damage' to the other , as well as to his lungs, skin and eyes. After Potronello was released he helped in establishing and organising a social centre and library in Santiago, Biblioteca Autónoma Sante Gerónimo Caserio, named after Sante Geronimo Caserio, the 19th century anarchist famous for assassinating Sadi Carnot, then President of France. Pitronello was killed in 2024 by accidental electrocution while operating a boom crane at work in La Reina, northeast Santiago.

== See also ==
- Category:Chilean anarchists
- List of anarchist movements by region
- Asociación Continental Americana de Trabajadores
- Industrial Workers of the World (Chile)

== Bibliography ==
- Araya Saavedra, Mario (2008). Los wobblies criollos: Fundación e ideología en la Región chilena de la Industrial Workers of the World – IWW (1919–1927) (PDF) (Thesis) (in Spanish). Santiago: Universidad ARCIS.
- Barret, Daniel (2010). El mapa del despertar anarquista: su expresion latinoamericano (in Spanish). Commission of Anarchist Relations.
- Cappelletti, Ángel J. (2017). "Chile". Anarchism in Latin America. Translated by Palmer-Fernández, Gabriel. Chico, California: AK Press. pp. 127–138. ISBN 978-1-84935-282-6. LCCN 2017936242. OCLC 1124018966.
- Covarrubias Bañados, Darío Renato (2009). Destruir para construir Violencia y acción directa, en la corriente anarquista chilena (1890–1914) (PDF) (Thesis). University of Valparaíso.
- Gambone, Larry (2005). El movimiento libertario en Chile (in Spanish). Valparaíso: Centro de Estudios Miguel Enríquez.
- Gambone, Larry (2009). "Anarchism, Chile". In Ness, Immanuel (ed.). The International Encyclopedia of Revolution and Protest. pp. 1–3. doi:10.1002/9781405198073.wbierp0047. ISBN 9781405198073. OCLC 8682045291.
- Godoy Sepúlveda, Eduardo Andrés (2007). ""Sepan que la tiranía de arriba, enjendra rebelión de abajo" Represión contra los anarquistas: La historia de Voltaire Argandoña y Hortencia Quinio (Santiago, 1913)" (PDF). Cuadernos de historia (in Spanish) (27). Santiago: University of Chile: 75–124. ISSN 0716-1832. OCLC 535532098.
- Grez Toso, Sergio (2007). Los anarquistas y el movimiento obrero en Chile. La alborada de "la Idea" en Chile (1893–1915) (in Spanish). Santiago: LOM Ediciones. ISBN 9781449261313. OCLC 992017748.
- Grez Toso, Sergio (2011). "Magno Espinoza. La pasión por el comunismo libertario". Cuadernos de historia (in Spanish) (34). Santiago: University of Santiago de Chile: 171–173. ISSN 0719-1243. OCLC 8521822077.
- Heredia M., Luis (2004) [1981]. El anarquismo en Chile (1897–1931) (in Spanish). Mexico City: Ediciones Antorcha. OCLC 10152535.
- Muñoz Cortés, Victor Manuel (2009). Armando Triviño: wobblie. Hombres, ideas y problemas del anarquismo en los años veinte (PDF). Colección Papeles para Amar (in Spanish). Vol. 8. Santiago: Editorial Quimantú. OCLC 835411893.
- Muñoz Cortés, Victor Manuel (2010). "Cuando las bombas son de papel. Los trabajadores, el Estado y la propaganda anarquista impresa (Región chilena, 1915–1927)" (PDF). In Silva Guzmán, Elisa (ed.). Seminario Simón Collier (in Spanish). Santiago: Pontifical Catholic University of Chile. pp. 77–112. ISBN 9789561411227. OCLC 916466711.
- Muñoz Cortés, Victor Manuel (2011). Cuando la Patria mata: La historia del anarquista Julio Rebosio (1914 -1920) (PDF) (in Spanish). Santiago: University of Santiago de Chile. ISBN 9789563031294. OCLC 949944639.
- Muñoz Cortés, Victor Manuel (2013). Sin Dios, Ni Patrones: Historia, diversidad y conflictos del anarquismo en la región chilena (1890–1990) (PDF) (in Spanish). Valparaíso: Mar y Tierra Ediciones. OCLC 932323694.
- Muñoz Cortéz, Victor Manuel (2015). "El anarquismo y los orígenes del movimiento sindical campesino en Osorno (1930–1940)" (PDF). Fronteras (in Spanish). 1 (2). University of La Frontera: 111–143. ISSN 0719-4285. OCLC 8772952070.
- Sanhueza Tohá, Jaime (1997). "La Confederación General de Trabajadores y el Anarquismo chileno de los años 30" (PDF). Historia (in Spanish). 30. Santiago: Pontifical Catholic University of Chile: 313–382. ISSN 0717-7194. OCLC 80307123.
- del Solar, Felipe; Pérez, Andrés (2008). Anarquistas: Presencia libertaria en Chile (in Spanish). Santiago: RIL Editores. ISBN 9789562846073. OCLC 963113350.
- Vitale, Luis (1998). Contribución a una Historia del Anarquismo en América Latina (in Spanish). Santiago: Ed. Instituto de Investigación de Movimientos Sociales "Pedro Vuskovic". OCLC 55465187.
- Vivanco, Alvaro; Miguez, Eduardo (2006) [1987]. El Anarquismo y el origen del Movimiento Obrero en Chile, 1881–1916 (in Spanish). Valparaíso: Centro de Estudios Miguel Enríquez.
