= Falabella =

Breed of horse

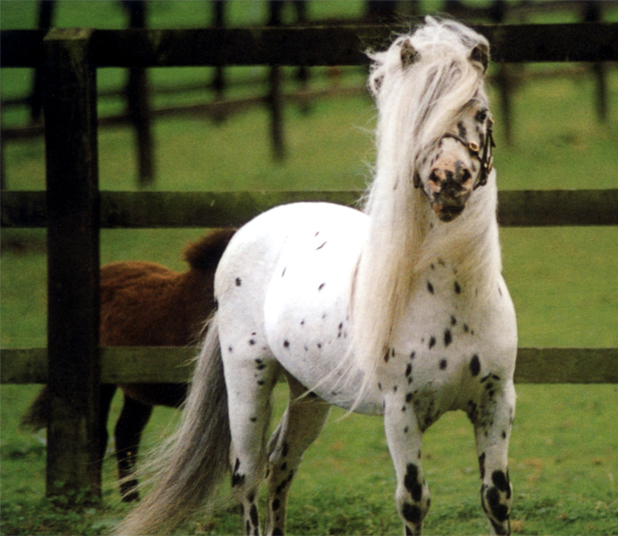
- A stallion
- Conservation status: FAO (2007): endangered; DAD-IS (2020): at risk
- Other names: Falabella Miniature Horse; Falabella Pony; Argentine Dwarf; Miniature Horse; Toy Horse
- Country of origin: Argentina
- Distribution: Americas, Europe
- Standard: Asociaciòn de Criadores de Caballos Falabella; Falabella Europe; Falabella Miniature Horse Association (USA)

Traits
- Weight: Male: 80 kg; Female: 70 kg
- Height: 63–86 cm; Male: 85 cm; Female: 70 cm

The Falabella is an Argentine breed of small horse. It is among the smallest of horse breeds, with a height at the withers in the range 63–86 cm (25–34 in)..

== History ==
The horses of South America descend from Andalusian and other Iberian stock brought to the Western Hemisphere by the Spanish. In the southern part of the continent, significant numbers of these horses developed within geographically isolated conditions and by the mid-nineteenth century there were some small, inbred animals in the herds of Mapuche of southern Buenos Aires province in Olavarría, Argentina. The Falabella was originally developed in Argentina from local horses of Criollo stock, beginning in 1868 with the breeding program of Patrick Newtall. When Newtall died, the herd and breeding methods were passed to his son-in-law, Juan Falabella. He added additional bloodlines, including the Welsh Pony, Shetland pony, and small Thoroughbreds. With considerable inbreeding, he was able to gain consistently small size within the herd.

Beginning in the 1940s, a descendant, Julio C. Falabella, created a formal breed registry, the Establecimientos Falabella, now the Asociación de Criadores de Caballos Falabella (Falabella Horse Breeders Association), and worked to standardize the breed to reach a consistent height, first achieving an average size of under 100 cm (40 in) Later breeders developed the modern standard, a horse breed that averaged approximately 76 cm (30 in) in height.

== Characteristics ==
The height of a fully-grown Falabella varies between 71 and 86 cm (28 and 34 in). Falabella foals are very small, standing around 30 to 56 cm (12 to 22 in) tall at birth, and maturing to their adult height by the age of three.

The Falabella has the proportions of a horse, with conformation similar to that of a Thoroughbred or Arab. The body is small and compact, with a sleek coat and a slim frame.

Bay, brown and black are the most common colors; pinto, palomino and spotted coats are less common.

== Use ==
The Falabella is kept as a pet or for show. It can be ridden by children no more than about eight years old, or trained to perform tricks or pull a small cart.
