= Anti-patriotism =

Ideology

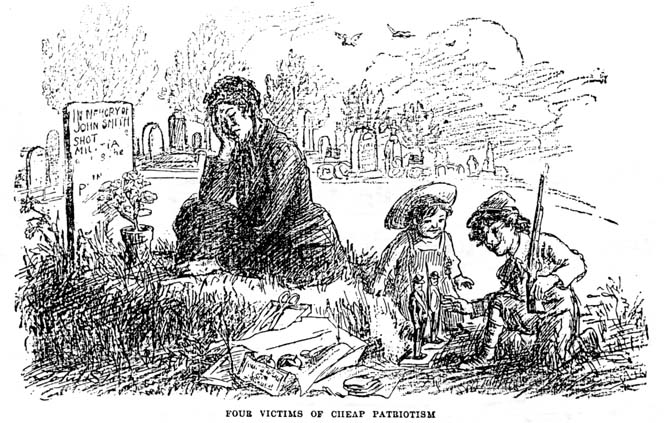
Four Victims of Cheap Patriotism (1910). Anti-war cartoon depicting a widow grieving the death of her husband alongside their children playing with a toy rifle and soldiers.

Anti-patriotism is the ideology that opposes patriotism; it usually refers to those with cosmopolitan views and is usually of an internationalist and anti-nationalist nature as well. Normally, anti-patriotism stems from the belief that patriotism is wrong since people born in a country, whether they like it or not and regardless of their individuality, are encouraged to love the country or sacrifice themselves for it; consequently, people who oppose patriotism may oppose its perceived authoritarianism, while others may believe that patriotism may lead to war because of geopolitical disputes. Usually, this term is used in a pejorative way by those who defend patriotism or nationalism, and terms such as cosmopolitanism or world citizenship may be used to avoid the bias that comes from the typical usage of the words anti-nationalism or anti-nationalist. The idea of multiple cultures intertwined has also been questioned as anti-patriotic, but mainly in smaller social communities: colleges, universities, etc. The Espionage Act of 1917 and the Sedition Act of 1918 were pieces of legislation in the United States that were passed after it entered World War I, to incriminate individuals who attempted to impede the war effort. Those who did so were punished and believed to be performing acts of anti-patriotism.

== Anarchist opposition to patriotism ==
Anarchists, most notably anarcho-communists, tend to oppose patriotism for several reasons, including:

- The belief in equality for all people
- The use of patriotism to subjugate the working class
- The association between patriotism and militarism
- The use of patriotism to encourage loyalty to the state

Emma Goldman stated:

Indeed, conceit, arrogance, and egotism are the essentials of patriotism. Let me illustrate. Patriotism assumes that our globe is divided into little spots, each one surrounded by an iron gate. Those who have had the fortune of being born on some particular spot, consider themselves better, nobler, grander, more intelligent than the living beings inhabiting any other spot. It is, therefore, the duty of everyone living on that chosen spot to fight, kill, and die in the attempt to impose his superiority upon all the others.

The individualist anarchist Hans Ryner also expressed his opposition to patriotism:

Anti-patriotism was the reaction of reason and sentiment the moment patriotism reigned. It took on diverse forms in accordance with the degree to which it relied more or less consciously on individualism, on love for all men, on love for one man (as with Camille, the sister of the Horatii), or even on a reasoned or sentimental preference for the laws and morals of a foreign country.

== Anti-patriotism in Japan ==
Kōtoku Shūsui, a famous Japanese anarchist of the late 19th/early 20th century, devoted a large section of his widely read Imperialism, Monster of the Twentieth Century to a condemnation of patriotism. One of the many arguments is based on the Confucian value of empathy: "I am as convinced as Mencius that any man would rush without hesitation to rescue a child who was about to fall into a well... A human being moved by such selfless love and charity does not pause to think whether the child is a family member or a close relative. When he rescues the child from danger, he does not even ask himself whether the child is his own or belongs to another." Patriotism is used to dehumanize others who we would naturally have empathy for. He argues, "[P]atriotism is a discriminating and arbitrary sentiment confined to those who belong to a single nation state or live together within common national borders", a sentiment cultivated and used by militarists in their drive for war.

== Anti-patriotism in Europe ==
Karl Marx famously stated that "The working men have no country" and that "the supremacy of the proletariat will cause them [national differences] to vanish still faster." The same view is promoted by present-day Trotskyists such as Alan Woods, who is "in favour of tearing down all frontiers and creating a socialist world commonwealth." There are some who, instead of an identity based solely on their country, integrate their European identity as part of their national one.

== See also ==
- Globalism
- Internationalism (politics)
- Nationalism
- Sedition
- Separatism
- Treason
