= Terrorism in Chile =

Terrorism in Chile has occurred since the 1980s and continues until the present. A number of bombings targeted public places, such as subway stations, as well as commercial institutions and interests, such as banks and ATMs.

== Terrorism by context ==
=== Santiago bombings ===
At the end of the military regime in 1986, a bomb exploded in the Tobalaba station in Santiago, Chile, killing one person and injuring seven others.

Over 200 individual bombings occurred from 2005 to 2014, over eighty groups claimed responsibility, however, authorities were not sure if it was multiple groups, related splinter cells or a single group which changed names. The names were changed to obie.

On 8 September 2014, a bombing occurred at the Escuela Militar metro station in Santiago, Chile. Fourteen people were injured, several seriously. No group has claimed responsibility, however, the attacks have been attributed to a Chilean Anarchist group, the Conspiracy of Cells of Fire (Chile).

On May 2, 2018 Members of Carabineros de Chile and the Fiscalía sur investigate an improvised explosive device abandoned in the metropolitan area of Santiago. The explosive did not explode and was destroyed by members of the anti-explosive unit. The group Individualistas Tendiendo a los Salvaje claim responsibility for this and other bombs that didn't detonate.

=== Araucanía and Mapuche ===
There has been a debate on whether some attacks linked to the Mapuche conflict in southern Chile constitute terrorism or not. These attacks, typically arson, concentrate in Araucanía Region but have also occurred in neighboring Bío Bío and Los Ríos Region. The conflict arises, among other issues, from land rights and the resulting clash between indigenous people and private development projects.

== Responses and counterterrorism efforts ==
=== Pinochet anti-terror laws ===
During the Pinochet dictatorship in Chile, an anti-terror law was enacted which allows suspects to be held in isolation without charges. The law also permits the use of phone taps and secret witnesses in investigations. This anti-terror law is currently in use by the government in its response to bombing attacks.

=== Criticism ===
Human Rights Watch (HRW) has criticized the Chilean government for inappropriately using anti-terrorist legislation against indigenous (Mapuche) groups involved in land conflicts. While recognizing that crimes have certainly been committed, HRW believes that they are not comparable to terrorist acts.

== See also ==
- Crime in Chile
