= Grupo de Operaciones Policiales Especiales =

Chilean law enforcement agency

Special Police Operations Group Grupo de Operaciones Policiales Especiales
- Motto: Actitud, Aptitud, Juicio y Disciplina

Agency overview
- Formed: June 7, 1979

Jurisdictional structure
- Operations jurisdiction: Chile

Operational structure
- Parent agency: Carabineros de Chile

Website
- www.carabineros.cl

The Grupo de Operaciones Policiales Especiales (GOPE; lit. 'Special Police Operations Group') is the police tactical unit of Carabineros de Chile which carries out high-risk police operations throughout the country, including location and tracking of bombs and explosives, bomb disposal, rescuing people or bodies from places of difficult access, anti-crime raids, and clashes. GOPE is a special force of military uniformed police, as stipulated in the Constitutional Act of Carabineros.

== History ==
GOPE was created on 7 June 1979 with the aim of acting as a complementary force to police troops across the country and respond to the various situations that occurred in the country during that time period. The Carabineros de Chile imported study models from North America and Europe to create a specialty on bomb disposal. The first course housed 120 applicants, which only 90 graduated, because some of the applicants were unable to complete strong physical demands of the course. Gope assisted in providing security to Pope John Paul II when he visited Chile on April 1, 1987. In 2013, the Special Operations Group received the name of Prefecture of Special Operations.

In November 2018, Captain Cristian Zárate Cruzat and Non-Commissioned Officer José Ferrada Macaya, from the GOPE, participated in the 2nd World Police Service Pistol Shooting Championship, held in Guangzhou, China. In August of 2026, it was announced that the Grupo de Operaciones Policiales Especiales would represent the Carabineros de Chile at the first international training event of the Network of Special Operations Units of the Eagles Network that is part of Ameripol. As of August 14, 2026, GOPE is led by Colonel Gerardo Anotonio Bascur Villagrán.

== Jurisdiction ==
The Special Police Operations Group has jurisdiction over the entire Chilean national territory, including the Insular Area and the Chilean Antarctic Territory. This is to ensure national security and not only state or regional.

== Vehicles ==
GOPE vehicles are mostly used for transporting equipment for the work of the EOD section.

Vehicle	Origin	Function
Hunter TR-12	Colombia	Armoured personnel carrier
Sherpa Light	France	Armored Vehicle
Mahindra Marksman	India	Armored Vehicle
Panhard PVP	France	Armored Vehicle
Chevrolet Tahoe	United States	Equipment Transport
Chevrolet Suburban	United States	Equipment Transport
Hyundai H1	South Korea	Equipment Transport
Nissan Frontier	Japan	Equipment Transport
Toyota Tundra	United States	

== Fields of operation ==
Their operations can be classified into four different groups:

=== Counter - terrorism ===
- Hostage rescue
- Entry and search

=== Counter - bombing ===
- Deactivation of explosives
- Counter bomb search
- Post detonation investigation

=== Human rescue ===
- Saturated or contaminated environments
- Rescue and salvage in aquatic environments
- Rescue and salvage in highlands

=== Protection of Person of Interest ===
- Direct security
- Altitude security (rooftop shooter)
- Reaction security
- Search of hotels and installations
- Search of vehicles

== See also ==
- Investigations Police of Chile
- Chilean Army
- Chilean Navy
