= Day of the Young Combatant =

Unofficial Chilean commemoration

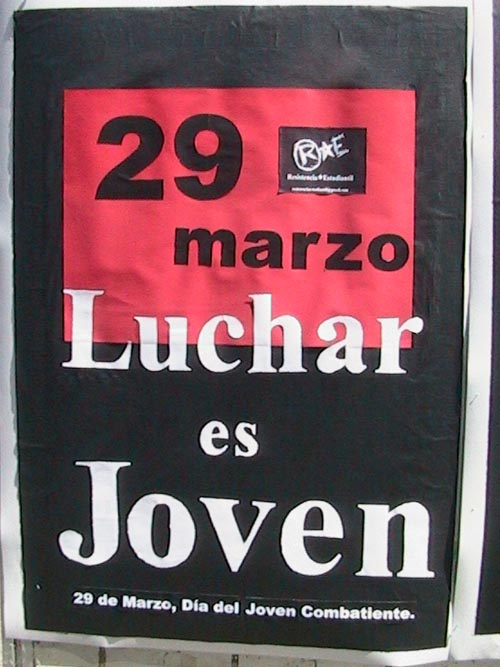
- A poster promoting the commemoration of Día del joven combatiente, 2007
- Observed by: Chile
- Date: 29 March
- Next time: 29 March 2027
- Frequency: annual

The Day of the Young Combatant (Spanish: Día del joven combatiente) is an unofficial remembrance day in Chile, primarily in Santiago. Observed annually on 29 March, the day commemorates the 1985 assassination of Revolutionary Left Movement (MIR) members Rafael and Eduardo Vergara Toledo by the Carabineros de Chile during the military dictatorship.

The main objective of this commemoration is to raise awareness about human rights and investigate various cases of extrajudicial killings that occurred during the dictatorship.

== Background ==
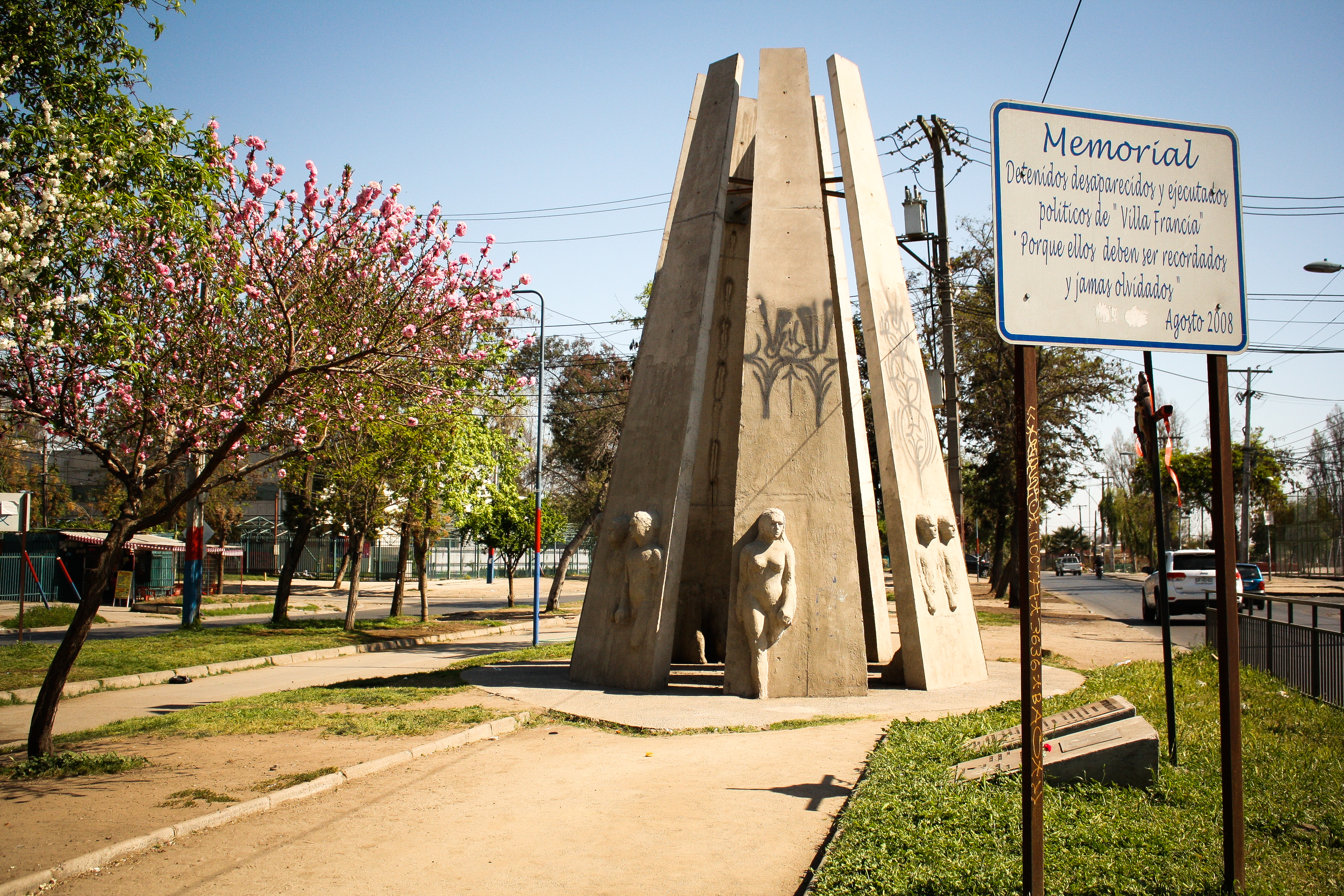
The Villa Francia Memorial, Estación Central commune in Santiago.

The Vergara-Toledo family resided in Villa Francia, a neighborhood known for its strong population and worker organization, as well as notable political activities among its residents. Due to their involvement in community and labor organizing, the family attracted the attention of state agents.

On the afternoon of 29 March 1985, an operation conducted by the Carabineros de Chile (Chilean police) took place at the Las Rejas-April 5 intersection in the Estación Central Commune, resulting in the death of the Vergara-Toledo brothers. Media reports at the time stated that Rafael Mauricio (18) and Eduardo Antonio (20) were students at the Liceo de Aplicación school and the Metropolitan University of Educational Sciences, respectively.

== Controversies ==
The day is often marked by acts of violence, including throwing rocks at buildings, vehicles, and the police, as well as fire-bombing using Molotov cocktails. The targets of this violence are not limited to public and government buildings but also extend to private property and commercial enterprises such as electrical wiring and power stations. These actions are sometimes used as a cover for looting and other deliberate violent acts committed by organized groups. Most of the violent protests occur in the Villa Francia neighborhood, located in the Estación Central Commune of western Santiago, where the Vergara Toledo family resided. While some commemorations in Chile involve peaceful marches, the Day of the Young Combatant has gained notoriety for its association with violent actions carried out by masked protesters, leading certain sectors to dub the event as the Day of the Young Delinquent (día del joven delincuente).

Local media and government agencies typically issue warnings to the public, advising them to stay indoors and expect power outages, especially in the Villa Francia neighborhood. Several institutions, including universities, often end classes early on this day to ensure that students can return home before nightfall when most of the violent attacks occur. Public transportation is also often limited due to frequent attacks on public buses.

Another day in Chile known for its violent tendencies and disruption is September 11, the anniversary of the 1973 coup d'état.
