= List of guerrilla movements =

This is a list of notable guerrilla movements. It gives their English name, common acronym, and main country of operation.

== Latin America ==
=== Argentina ===
- Tacuara Nationalist Movement (Movimiento Nacionalista Tacuara – MNT) (1955–1966)
- Justicialist National Militia (Milicia Nacional Justicialista – MNJ) (1955–1966)
- Peronist Armed Forces (Fuerzas Armadas Peronistas – FAP) (1968–1971)
- People's Revolutionary Army (Ejército Revolucionario del Pueblo – ERP) (1969–1976)
- Montoneros (Movimiento Peronista Montonero – MPM) (1970–1981)
- Libertarian Resistance (Resistencia Libertaria – RL) (1974–1978)
- Revolutionary Cells (Células Revolucionarias – CR) (2009–2011)
- Vandalika Teodoro Suárez Gang (Pandilla Vandalika Teodoro Suárez – PVTS) (2010–2011)
- Friends of the Earth (Amigxs de la Tierra – AdlT/FAI) (2011–2014)

=== Bolivia ===
- Zarate Willka Armed Forces of Liberation (FALZW)
- Ñancahuazú Guerrilla (ELN)
- Néstor Paz Zamora Commission (CNPZ)
- Túpac Katari Guerrilla Army (EGTK)
- Anarchic Cell For Revolutionary Solidarity (CASR)
- Revolutionary Left Movement

=== Brazil ===
- 8th October Revolutionary Movement (Movimento Revolucionário Oito de Outubro – MR8) (1964–1985)
- National Liberation Action (Ação Libertadora Nacional – ALN) (1964–1974)
- Palmares Armed Revolutionary Vanguard (Vanguarda Armada Revolucionária Palmares – VAR PALMARES) (1969–1972)
- Revolutionary People's Vanguard (Vanguarda Popular Revolucionária - VPR) (1966-1971)
- National Liberation Command (Comando de Libertação Nacional - COLINA) (1967–1969)
- Araguaia guerrilla (Guerrilha do Araguaia) (1966–1975)
- Revolutionary Nationalist Movement (Brazil) (Movimento Nacionalista Revolucionário - MNR) (1966–1967)
- Prestes Column (Coluna Prestes) (1925–1927)

=== Chile ===
- Revolutionary Left Movement (MIR) (1965–1987)
- Lautaro Youth Movement (MJL) (1982–1994)
- Manuel Rodríguez Patriotic Front (FPMR) (1983–1997)
- Leon Czolgosz Autonomous and Destructive Forces (FADLC) (2006–2009)
- Revolutionary Anarchist Front (FAR) (2007–2009)
- Severino di Giovanni Antipatriot Band (BASG) (2007–2012)
- Jean Marc Rouillan Armed and Heartless Columns (CAD-JMR) (2008–2012)
- Iconoclastic Caravans for Free Will (CIPLA) (2009–2012)
- Efraín Plaza Olmedo Dynamite Band (BDEPO) (2009–2013)
- Weichán Auka Mapu (WAM) (2011–present)
- Antagonic Nuclei of the New Urban Guerrilla (NANGU) (2011–present)

=== Colombia ===
- Revolutionary Armed Forces of Colombia (FARC) (1964–2016)
- National Liberation Army (ELN) (1964–present)
- 19th of April Movement (M–19) (1970–1990)
- Guevarista Revolutionary Army (1992–2008)
- Popular Liberation Army (1967–present)
- Simón Bolívar Guerrilla Coordinating Board (1987–1990s)
- Movimiento Armado Quintin Lame (1984–1991)
- Indigenous Revolutionary Armed Forces of the Pacific
- Brigada Clandestina Anarquista (BCA)

=== Cuba ===
- Revolutionary Directorate of 13 March Movement (DR-13-M) (1954–1966)
- 26th of July Movement (M-26-7) (1955–1962)
- Second National Front of Escambray (SFNE) (1959–1964)
- Brigade 2506 (1960–1962)
- Alpha 66 (1961–present)
- Directorio Revolucionario Estudiantil (1960-1966)

=== El Salvador ===
- Communist Party of El Salvador (PCS) (1930–1992)
- Farabundo Martí Liberation People's Forces (FPL) (1970–1992)
- Farabundo Martí National Liberation Front (FMLN) (1980–1992)
- National Resistance (RN) (1975–1992)
- People's Revolutionary Army (ERP) (1972–1992)

=== Mexico ===
- People's Guerrilla Group (GPG) (1963–1965)
- Party of the Poor (PdlP) (1967–1974)
- Zapatista Army of National Liberation (EZLN) (1994–present)
- Popular Revolutionary Army (EPR) (1996–present)
- Práxedis G. Guerrero Autonomous Cells of Immediate Revolution (CARI-PGG) (2009–2014)
- Mariano Sánchez Añón Insurrectional Cell (CI-MSA) (2010–2014)

=== Paraguay ===
- Paraguayan People's Army (EPP) (2008–present)
- United National Liberation Front (FULNA) (1960–1970)

=== Peru ===
- National Liberation Army (ELN) (1962–1965)
- Revolutionary Left Movement (MIR) (1962–1965)
- Communist Party of Peru (Shining Path) (PCP (SL)) (1980–present)
- Militarized Communist Party of Peru (MPCP) (1992–present)
- Túpac Amaru Revolutionary Movement (MRTA) (1982–1997)
- National Socialist Tercios of New Castile (2004–2009)

=== Venezuela ===
- Armed Forces of National Liberation (FALN) (1962–1969)
- Bolivarian Forces of Liberation (FBL) (1992–present)
- Bandera Roja (1970–present)
- Revolutionary Left Movement (MIR) (1960–1988)

=== Other Countries ===
- Guatemalan National Revolutionary Unity (URNG)
- Sandinista National Liberation Front (FSLN) – Nicaragua
- Jungle Commando – Suriname
- Contras – Nicaragua
- Morazanist Patriotic Front – Honduras
- Tupamaros Movimiento de Liberación Nacional Tupamaros – Uruguay
- National Union of Freedom Fighters (NUFF) May 1972 – November 1974 – Trinidad and Tobago

== North America ==
- Atomwaffen Division – Anti-government neo-Nazi terrorist group
- Black Liberation Army – United States
- American Indian Movement – United States – South Dakota
- Caribbean Revolutionary Alliance – Guadeloupe
- Earth Liberation Front – United States
- MEChA's Brown Berets (paramilitary security force) – United States – "Border War"

=== Historical ===
- Symbionese Liberation Army – United States
- Weather Underground – United States
- Black Panther Party – United States
- Quantrill's Raiders led by William Quantrill – United States
- Front de libération du Québec – Canada
- Direct Action – Canada, Know by the media as Squamish Five. An Anarchist and Feminist self styled urban guerrilla group.
- The Order—United States
- 3 Percenters – United States

== Europe ==
=== Cyprus ===
==== Cyprus Emergency – Cyprus ====
- National Organisation of Cypriot Fighters (EOKA) during Cyprus Emergency – Cyprus
- National Organisation of Cypriot Fighters-B (EOKA-B) during Cypriot intercommunal violence and Turkish invasion of Cyprus – Cyprus
- Turkish Resistance Organisation (TMT) during Cypriot intercommunal violence and Turkish invasion of Cyprus – Cyprus

=== Germany ===
- Tupamaros West-Berlin (TW) (1969–1970)
- Red Army Faction (RAF) (1970–1998) – known also as Baader-Meinhof Gang
- 2 June Movement (1972–1980)
- Revolutionary Cells (RZ) (1973–1995)
- National Task Force (NEK) (1991)
- Anti-Imperialist Cell (AIZ) (1992-1995)
- National Socialist Underground (NSU) (1999–2007)

=== Ireland ===
- Continuity Irish Republican Army (CIRA) (1986–present)
- Irish Citizen Army (1913–1947)
- Army Comrades Association (ACA) (1932–1935)
- Irish People's Liberation Organization (1986–1992)
- Irish National Liberation Army (INLA) (1974–2009/present)
- Official Irish Republican Army (1969–1990s)
- Oglaigh na hEireann (CIRA splinter group) (2009–present)
- Provisional Irish Republican Army (IRA) (1969–1998)
- Real Irish Republican Army (RIRA) (1998–present)

=== Spain ===
- Basque Fatherland and Liberty (ETA) (1959–2017)
- First of October Anti-Fascist Resistance Groups (GRAPO) (1975–2007)
- Falange y Tradición (FyT) (2008–2009)
- Milícia Catalana (MC) (1976–1990s)
- Free Land (TL) (1978–1991)
- Armed Guanche Forces (FAG) (1976–1979)
- Guerrilla Army of the Free Galician People (EGPGC) (1986–1991)
- Revolutionary Antifascist Patriotic Front (FRAP) (1973–1978)
- Revolutionary Armed Struggle (LAR) (1978–1984)

=== France ===
==== Corsican Conflict – Corsica ====
- National Liberation Front of Corsica (FLNC) (1976–1990)
- FLNC Split Organizations (1990–Present)
- Resistenza (1989–2003)
- Fronte Ribellu (FR) (1996–1999)
- Armata Corsa (AC) (1999–2001)

==== Other ====
- Iparretarrak (IK) (1972–2000)
- Breton Liberation Front (FLB) (1963–1990)
- Breton Revolutionary Army (ARB) (1971–Present)
- National Liberation Front of Provence (2012–Present)

=== Other ===
- Action Directe (AD) – France
- Democratic Army of Greece, Communist partisans during the Greek Civil War – Greece
- National Liberation Army – North Macedonia
- Albanian National Army – North Macedonia, Kosovo, Serbia, Montenegro, Greece
- Kosovo Liberation Army (KLA) – Kosovo
- Liberation Army of Preševo, Medveđa and Bujanovac – Serbia
- Chechen guerrillas under nominal leadership of Aslan Maskhadov (who is now deceased) – Chechnya
- International Revolutionary Communist Front (FCRI) - Italy
- Red Brigades (BR, later split, BR-PCC and BR-UCC largest factions) – Italy
- Lisowczycy (Polish)
- Snapphane Movement – Sweden, pro-Danish partisans that fought against the Swedes in the 17th century.
- Guerrilla warfare in the Peninsular War (Spain, Portugal)
- (Kingdom of the Two Sicilies) Briganti (Italy)
- Combat Organization of the Polish Socialist Party (Congress Poland, particularly active during the Polish events of the 1905 Russian Revolution)
- Irish Republican Army – Ireland (prior to the establishment of an independent state of Ireland)
- Kuva-yi Milliye during Turkish War of Independence – Turkey
- Internal Macedonian Revolutionary Organization – Macedonia (region)*
- World War II Resistance movements in various countries, many sponsored by the Allied governments:
  - Soviet partisans in the Axis-occupied territories during World War II
  - Greek People's Liberation Army (ELAS) – Greece
  - Freies Deutschland – German-occupied territories of the Soviet Union and Germany (East Prussia, Cologne)
  - Polish resistance movement in World War II (many of these groups were a part of the Polish Underground State, the large guerrilla movement that initiated the Warsaw Uprising, as well as some other anti-Nazi partisan-warfare-based actions like the Zamość Uprising, the Battle of Osuchy, the Raid on Mittenheide, Operation Tempest, or Operation Heads).
    - Henryk Dobrzański (Polish – the first guerrilla commander of the Second World War in Europe)
    - Armia Krajowa (Home Army) (Polish)
    - Leśni
    - Silent Unseen
    - Battalion Zośka
    - Uderzeniowe Bataliony Kadrowe
    - National Armed Forces
    - Bataliony Chłopskie (Polish)
    - Armia Ludowa (communist-ruled Poland)
    - Bielski partisans (Jewish)
    - Parczew partisans (Jewish)
  - Yugoslav Partisans – Yugoslavia
  - Chetniks – Yugoslavia
- Anti-Soviet partisans and pro-Axis partisans
  - Forest Brothers – Estonia/Latvia/Lithuania (World War II–1952 approx.)
  - Werwolf – Germany
  - Anti-communist resistance in Poland (1944–1953) – Poland
    - Cursed soldiers
  - Ukrainian Insurgent Army (UPA) – Ukraine

== Africa ==
- Republic of the Rif– Morocco Battle of Annual Abd el-Krim's guerrilla tactics influenced Ho Chi Minh, Mao Zedong, and Che Guevara.
- Umkhonto we Sizwe (MK) – South Africa (armed wing of the African National Congress)
- Ambazonia Defence Forces – Southern Cameroons/Cameroon (armed wing of the Ambazonia Governing Council)
- Ambazonia Restoration Forces (ARF) – Southern Cameroon/Ambazonia (armed wing of the Interim Government of Ambazonia /IG)
- (Ambazonia) Southern Cameroons Defence Forces – Southern Cameroons/Cameroon (armed wing of the African People's Liberation Movement)
- Ambazonia Self-Defence Council – Southern Cameroons/Cameroon (umbrella organization consisting of armed groups loyal to the Interim Government of Ambazonia)
- Kenya Land and Freedom Army (KLFA or Mau Mau) – Kenya
- National Liberation Front of Angola (FNLA) – Angola (nationalist guerrillas who first fought the Portuguese and later Angola's communist led regime)
- Popular Movement for the Liberation of Angola (MPLA) – Angola (communist guerrillas who fought Portuguese rule and later established a Marxist regime)
- National Union for the Total Independence of Angola (UNITA) – Angola (anti-communist guerrillas backed by the United States and Apartheid South Africa. Angolan Civil War)
- Eritrean Liberation Front (ELF) – Eritrea
- Eritrean People's Liberation Front (EPLF) – Eritrea (communist split group of the ELF)
- Liberians United for Reconciliation and Democracy (LURD) – Liberia
- Popular Front for the Liberation of Saguia el Hamra and Rio de Oro (POLISARIO) – Western Sahara
- Zimbabwe African People's Union – Rhodesia/Zimbabwe.
- Mozambican Liberation Front (FRELIMO) – Mozambique (communist guerrillas who won independence from Portugal and established a Marxist regime)
- Mozambican National Resistance (RENAMO) – Mozambique (anti-communist guerrillas, supported by Rhodesia and South Africa, who fought in the Mozambican Civil War)
- South-West Africa People's Organization (SWAPO) – Namibia (an independence movement that fought South African rule during the Apartheid era)
- Movement for the Emancipation of the Niger Delta (MEND) – Nigeria
- Lesotho Liberation Army (LLA) – Lesotho
- Lord's Resistance Army (LRA) – Uganda
- Uganda People's Democratic Army – Uganda
- National Resistance Army – Uganda
- Azanian People's Liberation Army (earlier known as Poqo) – South Africa (armed wing of the PAC)
- Afrikaner Weerstandsbeweging (AWB) – South Africa
- Islamic Front for the Liberation of Oromia
- Oromo Liberation Front
- Sudan People's Liberation Army – SPLA. South Sudanese based rebel group that fought against the Islamist and Arab dominated regime in Khartoum during the Second Sudanese Civil War. They now control the independent nation of South Sudan
- Sudan Liberation Movement/Army
- Justice and Equality Movement
- Janjaweed
- Niger Movement for Justice
- Patriotic Liberation Front (FPL) - Niger
- Green Resistance – Gaddafi supporters in Libya post–2011
- Democratic Forces for the Liberation of Rwanda or FDLR – Successor to ALiR, Hutu extremists
- Army for the Liberation of Rwanda or ALiR – Hutu nationalists who fled Rwanda after the 1994 Genocide and took up arms in the neighbouring Democratic Republic of Congo
- Sudan People's Liberation Movement-in-Opposition or SPLM-IO (South Sudanese rebels fighting the SPLM led government since 2013. South Sudanese Civil War
- Alliance of Democratic Forces for the Liberation of Congo-Zaire or the AFDL. These were anti-Mobutu rebels in the former Zaire during the First Congo War
- Rally for Congolese Democracy – RCD, anti-government forces backed by Rwanda during the Second Congo War
- Movement for the Liberation of Congo – anti-government forces backed by Uganda during the Second Congo War
- Somali National Movement (SNM) – Somaliland
- Lakurawa - Nigeria
- 25 January Revolutionary Movement - Egypt

== Asia ==
- Turkistan Islamic Party (ETIP) – Xinjiang, China
- Northern Alliance – Afghanistan
- Taliban – Afghanistan
- Haqqani Network – Afghanistan
- Jundallah – Iran/Pakistan
- Free Joseon – North Korea
- Al-Qaeda – has been based in Afghanistan
- Mujahedin – (generic grouping) Central Asia, Middle East, Indian subcontinent, Southeast Asia
- Free Papua Movement – Indonesia
- Moro National Liberation Front (MNLF) – Philippines
- East Indonesia Mujahideen (MIT) – Indonesia
- Moro Islamic Liberation Front (MILF, a break away group of the MNLF) – Philippines
- New People's Army (NPA) – Philippines
- Abu Sayyaf – Philippines
- Khmer National Unity Front (KNUF) – Cambodia
- Cambodian Freedom Fighters (CFF) – Cambodia
- Lashkar-e-Toiba – based in Pakistan
- United Liberation Front of Asom – India/Bangladesh
- Balochistan Liberation Army – Pakistan
- Balochistan Liberation Front – Pakistan
- Baloch Nationalist Army – Pakistan
- PJAK-PKK —Kurdistan
- Jammu Kashmir Liberation Front – Kashmir
- Hizbul Mujahideen – Kashmir
- Jaish-e-Mohammed – Pakistan
- Naxalite Movement – India
- People's Liberation Army, Nepal – Nepal
- People's Liberation Guerrilla Army (India) – India (Andhra Pradesh)
- Anti-Fascist Internationalist Front – Myanmar (Chin State)

=== Historical ===
- Chushi Gangdruk – Tibet, China
- Chinese Communist Party – China
- Pathet Lao – Laos
- Katipunan (KKK) – Philippines
- Righteous army – Korea
- Korean People's Guerrilla Army – Korea
- Khmer Rouge – Cambodia
- National Front for the Liberation of Vietnam (NLF) – Vietnam
- Hukbalahaps – Philippines
- Revolutionary Front of Independent East Timor (FRETILIN) East-Timor
- Viet Minh – Vietnam
- Communist Party of Malaya – Malaya/Malaysia
- Shivaji – India
- Free Aceh Movement – Aceh, Indonesia
- Saqqawists – Kingdom of Afghanistan
- People's Liberation Guerrilla Army (Andhra Pradesh) – India
- Mukti Bahini - East Pakistan (Bangladesh)
- Liberation Tigers of Tamil Eelam (LTTE) – Sri Lanka

== Middle East ==
- Turkistan Islamic Party in Syria (TIP-S) – Syria
- The Islamic Resistance Front in Syria - Syria
- Muqdad Coastal Shield Brigade - Syria
- Irgun
- PKK — Kurdistan
- PKK - YPG — Kurdistan
- PKK - PJAK — Kurdistan
- Lehi
- Ansar al-Islam
- Popular Resistance Committees
- Hezbollah – Lebanon
- Popular Front for the Liberation of Oman
- Front for the Liberation of the Golan – Syria
- Jund al-Karrar Brigades - Syria

=== Iran ===
- Iranian People's Fadaee Guerrillas (IFPG) (1979–present)
- People's Mujahedin of Iran (MEK) (1965–present)
- Union of Iranian Communists (Sarbedaran) (UIC (S)) (1976–2001)
- PJAK-PKK

=== Iraq ===
- Guardians of Blood Brigades - Islamic Resistance in Iraq
- Ya Ali Popular Formations

=== Palestine ===
- Al-Aqsa Martyrs' Brigades (2000–present)
- Democratic Front for the Liberation of Palestine (DFLP) (1968–present)
- Hamas (1987–present)
- Palestinian Islamic Jihad (PIJ) (1987–present)
- Palestine Liberation Organization (PLO) (1964–1993)
- Popular Front for the Liberation of Palestine (PFLP) (1967–present)
- Mujahideen Brigades
- Internationalists Brigades for the Palestinian Liberation

== Oceania ==
- Bougainville Revolutionary Army (BRA) — Papua New Guinea
- Malaita Eagle Force (MEF) — Solomon Islands

== See also ==
- List of guerrillas
- Partisan (military)
