= Friends of the Earth (Argentina) =

- Amigxs de la Tierra
- Dates active: October 31, 2011–March 21, 2014
- Country: Argentina
- Headquarters: Buenos Aires
- Ideology: Egoist anarchism Individualist anarchism Insurrectionary anarchism Anarchism without adjectives Anti-imperialism; Anti-capitalism; Illegalism; Internationalism
- Political position: Post-left
- Status: Dissolved
- Part of: Informal Anarchist Federation

The Friends of the Earth (Spanish: Amigxs de la Tierra/FAI) was an urban guerrilla group from Buenos Aires, known for perpetrating arson attacks against public and private vehicles (popularly known as "sunroofs").

== Background ==
During the years 2010 to 2013, anarchist groups claimed the largest campaign of political violence in recent Argentine history, without deaths or injuries, with attacks that reached police patrols, government and bank buildings and private property. The authorities attributed several small-scale attacks against financial institutions and offices of prominent national and foreign companies to Chilean anarchist groups. The modus operandi of the "sunroofs" usually attacked at night or at dawn, or if the area was quiet, they even did it at noon, always quickly and cautiously leaving small incendiary explosives or spraying gasoline on the tires.

== Attacks ==
The group began to carry out arson attacks in the towns of Villa del Parque and Caballito in late 2011 and early 2012, posting their statements on anarchist websites. As the year progressed, the number of cars burned down accumulated, the main targets being police vehicles, public transport and high-end luxury cars, while the most affected towns continued to be Caballito, Palermo, Villa Devoto and Villa del Parque, raising the alarm of the authorities. One of the group's most media-focused attacks was on August 15, 2012 when the group carried out an explosive-incendiary attack with two gasoline-based devices at the Fiat car dealership, in the town of Villa Urquiza. Days later, the group claimed responsibility for the attack. They also attacked vehicles in Recoleta and near the Italian embassy in Buenos Aires, as well as multiple attacks claimed in October. During 2012 the group and several anarchists carried out dozens of arson attacks in the metropolitan area of Buenos Aires, accounting for around 200 damaged vehicles in that year alone, intensifying their actions in the last days of the year.

In January 2013 the group claimed responsibility for an improvised explosive in front of the facilities of the National Directorate of the Federal Penitentiary Service and more than 25 attacks against luxury and high-end vehicles in the neighborhoods of Belgrano, Nuñez, Recoleta, Palermo, Villa Urquiza, Caballito and Villa Devoto, receiving attention from the authorities and the press. In addition, the group continued attacking during the months of February to May in the aforementioned neighborhoods and their surroundings.

After several attacks on cars, on September 18, 2013 the group claimed an explosive attack on the Gendarmerie mutual building in the Balvanera neighborhood, slightly wounding two gendarmes who were on guard. The attack received media coverage, being attended by personnel from the 5th Police Station and Firefighters of the Federal Police and the Federal Court No. 2 intervened in the case. After this the group continued carrying out arson attacks on police or cannon vehicles around the metropolitan area.

On January 9, 2014, the group claimed responsibility for an arson attack against a Fiat dealership, this in the neighborhood of Villa Urquiza. The attack left more than 13 vehicles damaged, in addition to claiming more burning vehicles in Buenos Aires neighborhoods. The group's last statement was released on March 21, 2014, claiming responsibility for the burning of Federal Police vehicles and other vehicles in the area.

== See also ==
- Anarchism in Argentina
- Revolutionary Cells
- Vandalika Teodoro Suárez Gang
- Libertarian Resistance
