= Women in the FMLN =

Women played a very crucial role in the Farabundo Martí National Liberation Front (FMLN) during the Salvadoran Civil War. Their involvement in the revolutionary movement was due to the country's conditions under the Salvadoran government's authoritarian military rule. Many civilians, especially women, faced political repression, socioeconomic inequality, and state violence, which pushed many women to join the movement to gain protection and demonstrate resistance. Women stepped into various roles while in the FMLN, which overall helped the success of the revolutionary movement. Although the guerrilla group promoted equality within the FMLN, they continued to push traditional gender expectations onto women. In addition, there were instances of sexual harassment and limitations due to the expectation that they must be caretakers. A very few number of women like Maria Serrano challenged these setbacks by becoming leaders within the guerrilla. After the war, many women faced challenges returning to their original civilian lives, especially because of the discrimination they experienced when it came to land redistribution programs. Although later they experienced some improvements when it came to the distribution of the land titles, the inequality still remained. This led to the rise of women's organizations and feminist movements in El Salvador.

== Historical context ==
The Farabundo Marti National Liberation Front, also known as the FMLN, was a guerrilla movement that took place in El Salvador during the late 1980s. Many of the Latin American guerrilla movements, like the FMLN, took inspiration from the Cuban Revolution. Before the revolutionary movement started, El Salvador was a country led by fourteen elite families. They controlled everything from land, banks, and industries, while the rest of the everyday civilians were met with immense poverty. To maintain their power and influence over the country, they implemented political repression tactics and death squads that targeted Christian communities that spoke out about social justice and the problems within the government. Jesuit priest Rutilio Grande was assassinated in 1977, which resulted in Archbishop Oscar Romero publicly speaking about the unjust state violence by the Salvadorian Government and their use of U.S. military aid. He even pleaded to President Jimmy Carter to stop giving the Salvadorian government support because they were using their resources were being used to repress Salvadorian civilians. This ultimately made Archbishop Oscar Romero a target of the death squad, which resulted in his assassination in 1980. Due to the corruption, repression, socioeconomic inequality, and political censorship, people resorted to guerrilla warfare in attempts to regain the power of the people. In an attempt to fight back and overthrow the government, the “FMLN launched a general offensive”, but it ended up backfiring and increased the brutality of the military towards its civilians. This resulted in the El Mozote massacre, in which thousands of civilians were killed by a special-forces unit trained by the U.S. called the Atlacatl Battalion. Many Salvadorans living in rural communities were left either displaced or pushed into the FMLN.

== Factors leading Women to join the FMLN ==
A combination of many factors played a role in why women decided to join the FLMN at the time. Some women were pushed to join due to the intense political repression of the Salvadorian government. Due to the increased massacres, disappearances, and attacks on civilians, El Salvador became a very dangerous place for women, which led them to join the FMLN as a form of protection. Participating in the FMLN was also their form of showing resistance against the government's repression. For reference, the revolution was so severe that it ended up “creating 1.5 million refugees and claiming the lives of more than 70,000 people, most of them civilians”. In addition to the political repression, many women decided to join due to the country's immense poverty and structural inequality. Many women who worked in urban and rural organizations such as unions, churches, student groups, and mothers' associations came to learn all the political inequalities that were taking place. This resulted in them becoming more involved in the resistance since they saw that nothing was being done to improve their living conditions. Another factor that led women to join was their personal traumas living in El Salvador with all the state repression. Women who were personal victims of the military repression and family members who have been affected all looked towards the FMLN as a form of resistance and protection. Other women also joined because they were inspired by the FMLN’s revolutionary ideology, such as Marxism, anti-imperialism, help for the poor and working class, collective organizing, and gender equality. FMLN was a possible way to challenge the stereotypical gender roles, receive an education, and even have the opportunity to gain leadership positions. Women within the guerrilla group were “characterized by [their] political motivation, ideological conviction, and as [agents] for change”. Women in El Salvador wanted to see change, and the FMLN was an opportunity to show solidarity in the fight against an oppressive government.

== Roles of women in the FMLN ==
Women played a significant role within the FMLN, and their contributions were crucial to the success of the revolutionary movement. It was reported that before the war ended, there were about 100,000 people in the FMLN, 60 percent of whom were women, and 30 percent of those women were armed combatants. Since the collective support of everyone within the guerrilla group was essential to their survival, women weren’t limited to just supportive roles. They took on both traditional and non-traditional gender roles. The types of roles they would work in were organizers[, political educators, messengers, cooks, nurses, radio operators, intelligence gatherers, transportation organizers, and some of them even fight in the frontlines as combatants. Women served as “gendered revolutionary bridges between organizations”. They also played a huge role in helping maintain the guerrilla camp, whether it be through boosting the people's morale or coordinating the supplies they needed. Some women in the camp played more traditional supportive roles, such as caretaking for the children who grew up in the guerrilla camps. Kids would end up in these guerrilla camps by having parents that are part of the FMLN, or, in more unfortunate events, lost their parents due to state repression, which forced them to join the guerrilla group to seek protection. While these kids grew up in the camp, women would take on caretaker roles and become a mother figure to many of them.

== Gender dynamics within the guerrilla ==
The gender dynamics of men and women in the guerrilla were influenced by its revolutionary ideals, but also still kept some traditional patriarchal norms. Although the guerrilla group promised equality and empowerment to women, it still places some limitations on them. Within the guerrilla camp, their dynamic was that you were a comrade first, no matter the gender. The success of the revolutionary group came first before anything else. A former male combatant stated:

“The commander trusted her. She was efficient, effective, and had capacity, and she had earned her position. It was her precision, it wasn’t physical strength, but precision. I was surprised. I thought they would call a big guy, but she was really tiny, holding the large bazooka.”

Women were able to take up positions as fighters, which were originally male-dominated military spaces. Not just that, but the guerrilla group also gave them the opportunity to gain leadership roles such as commanding units, political educators, and high-ranking positions. However, since they were in mostly male-dominated spaces, the issue of sexual harassment still remained. In addition, the idea of motherhood still posed as a limitation to many women in the FMLN. The guerrilla group reinforced the idea that reproductive control and childcare were the responsibility of women. Since children also often relied on female combatants for protection, care, and emotional support, this made women have to take on two roles: a caregiver and a fighter.

== Notable female guerrilla leader ==
Maria Serrano was one of the most recognized female leaders within the FMLN. The documentary Maria’s Story gives insight into how her life was as a female leader in the FMLN. Maria was portrayed as a “practical and inspiring thinker who motivates not only her own family to get involved in the struggle, but many others as well”. Her dedication and commitment to the revolutionary group were greatly influenced by personal tragedies that she experienced from the military repression. She was said to have tragically lost her daughter due to an army ambush in 1987, in which the soldiers mutilated her body. The loss of her daughter just strengthened her determination, and this shows how there are sacrifices that women face when being part of the FMLN. Her story shows what it meant to be a female leader in a guerrilla group. Maria Serrano was one of the very few women who broke out of the traditional gender roles in the FMLN. She demonstrated that a leader could be strong in combat while also being caring and emotionally supportive.

== Postwar experience and legacy ==
After the 1992 peace accords which ended the Salvadorian Civil war, many women faced the difficulty of having to return to their original civilian lives. Although women made up a significant part of the FMLN's members, initially after the war they faced discrimination when it came to the distribution of land titles. Originally, many married women were excluded from land registries or just placed under the name of their husbands although official guidelines at the time required the registration of each individual. Women activist and NGOs such as the Mujeres por la Dignidad y la Vida pointed out that local leaders often discriminated against women which left them “at the margins of the benefits of the land transfer program”. However, it was later found that as of March 4, 1996, 4282 ex-combatants and 14,652 tenedores (FMLN land occupiers during the war) received private land titles and an extra 677 ex-combatants received state owned properties. Out of all these beneficiaries one third were women. Out of the total of 18,934 individuals who received private properties, 1,122 were female ex-combatants and 5,203 were female tenedores which is 33.4% of all the beneficiaries. The percent of female FMLN combatants at the time they were being demobilized was 29.1% and the percent of those ex-combatants that received benefits was 26.2%. Despite these corrections to programs and improvements, the perception of discrimination amongst female ex-FMLN combatants still remained. This can explain why many women’s movements and feminist organizations arose postwar in El Salvador.

== See also ==
- Salvadoran Civil War
- Feminism in Latin America
- Women's social and revolutionary activism in 20th century El Salvador

== Bibliography ==
- Becker, Marc. 2019. “FARC, Shining Path, and Guerrillas in Latin America.” Oxford Research Encyclopedia of Latin American History. Oxford University Press. Accessed November 9, 2025. https://oxfordre.com/latinamericanhistory/view/10.1093/acrefore/9780199366439.001.0001/acrefore-9780199366439-e-218
- Dickson-Gómez, Julia. 2002. “Growing up in Guerrilla Camps: The Long-Term Impact of Being a Child Soldier in El Salvador’s Civil War.” Ethos 30 (4): 327–56. Accessed 9 Nov. 2025. http://www.jstor.org/stable/3651878
- Dietrich Ortega, Luisa Maria. 2012. “Looking Beyond Violent Militarized Masculinities: Guerrilla Gender Regimes in Latin America.” International Feminist Journal of Politics 14 (4): 489–507, https://doi.org/10.1080/14616742.2012.726094
- Kruijt, Dirk. 2024. “The Central American Guerrilla Movements.” Oxford Research Encyclopedia of Latin American History. Oxford University Press. Accessed November 9, 2025. https://oxfordre.com/latinamericanhistory/view/10.1093/acrefore/9780199366439.001.0001/acrefore-9780199366439-e-1195
- Luciak, Ilja A. 1999. “Gender Equality in the Salvadoran Transition.” Latin American Perspectives 26 (2): 43–67. JSTOR, http://www.jstor.org/stable/2634294
- Mason, T. David. 1992. “Women’s Participation in Central American Revolutions: A Theoretical Perspective.” Comparative Political Studies 25 (1): 63–89. HeinOnline
- Shayne, Julia Denise. 1999. “Gendered Revolutionary Bridges: Women in the Salvadoran Resistance Movement (1979–1992).” Latin American Perspectives 26 (3): 85–102. https://doi.org/10.1177/0094582X9902600305
- Stephen, Lynn. 2010. “An FMLN Woman’s Story of Courage and Conviction, 20 Years Later.” NACLA Report on the Americas 43 (5): 41
- Vázquez, Norma. 1997. “Motherhood and Sexuality in Times of War: The Case of Women Militants of the FMLN in El Salvador.” Reproductive Health Matters 5 (9): 139–46. https://doi.org/10.1016/S0968-8080(97)90017-3
- Viterna, Jocelyn. 2012. “The Left and ‘Life’ in El Salvador.” Politics & Gender 8 (2): 248–54. https://doi.org/10.1017/S1743923X12000244
