= Political positions of Dianne Feinstein =

Full coverage of the policies of a US politician

Dianne Feinstein
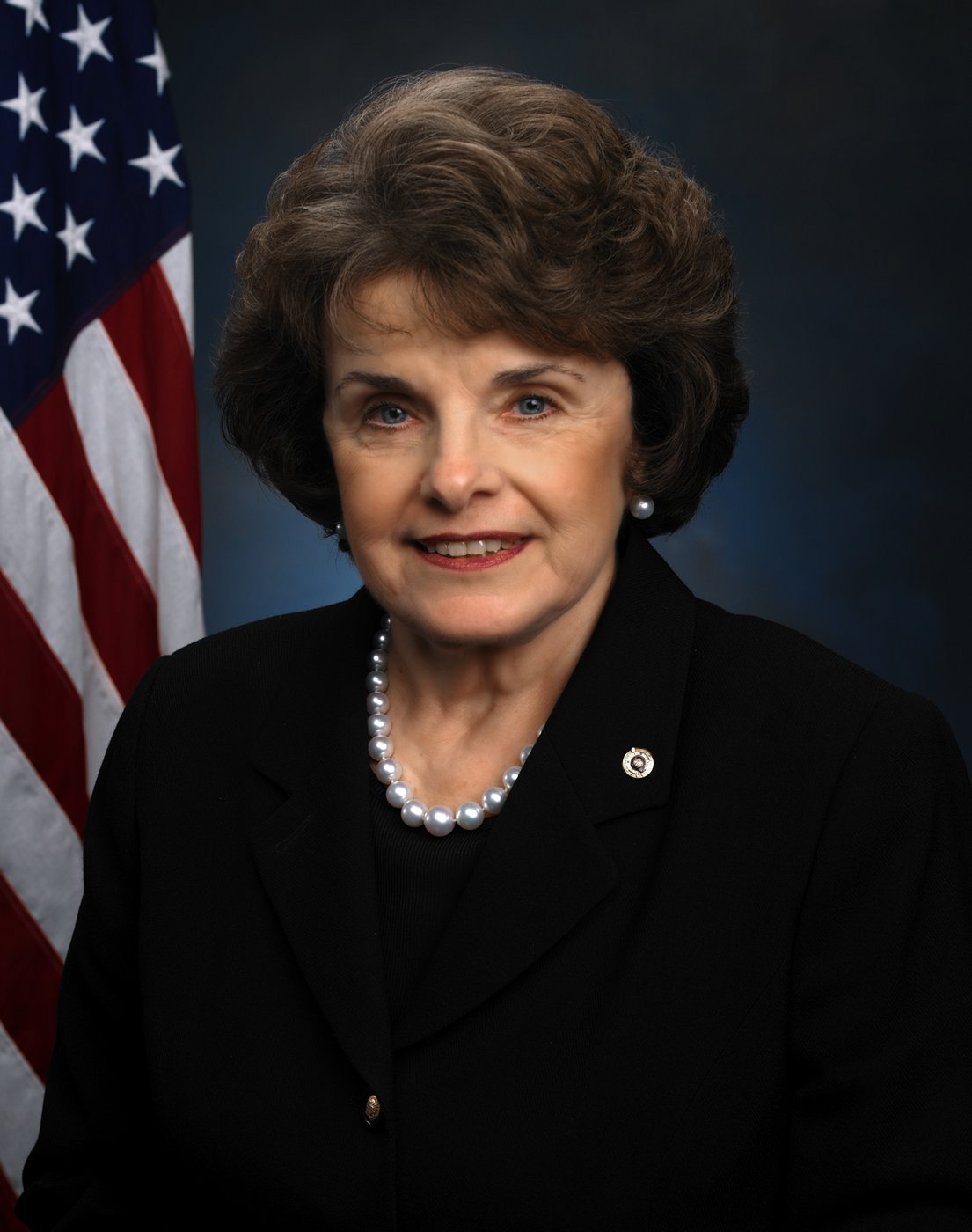
- In office November 10, 1992 – September 28, 2023
- Preceded by: John F. Seymour
- Succeeded by: Laphonza Butler

38th Mayor of San Francisco
- In office December 4, 1978 – January 8, 1988
- Preceded by: George Moscone
- Succeeded by: Art Agnos

Personal details
- Born: June 22, 1933 San Francisco, California
- Died: September 29, 2023 (aged 90) Washington, D.C.
- Party: Democratic
- Spouse(s): Judge Jack Berman (div.); Bertram Feinstein (deceased); Richard C. Blum (deceased)
- Education: Stanford University

Dianne Feinstein was the senior senator representing California in the U.S. Senate. A Democrat, she served in the Senate from 1992 to 2023. Prior to her Senate tenure, Feinstein ran for Governor of California and served as Mayor of San Francisco.

In 2018, the Los Angeles Times wrote that Feinstein had emphasized her centrism when she first ran for statewide offices in the 1990s (an era when California was more conservative than it became during Feinstein's later career). Over time, she moved left of center as California became one of the most Democratic states in the nation. In 2013, The New York Times called her a "liberal lioness". Feinstein was known for her advocacy for gun control, abortion access, environmental protection, and a strong national defense.

== Agriculture ==
In March 2019, Feinstein was one of 38 senators to sign a letter to U.S. Secretary of Agriculture Sonny Perdue warning that dairy farmers "have continued to face market instability and are struggling to survive the fourth year of sustained low prices" and urging his department to "strongly encourage these farmers to consider the Dairy Margin Coverage program."

In June 2019, Feinstein and 18 other Democratic senators sent a letter to USDA Inspector General (IG) Phyllis K. Fong with the request that the IG investigate USDA instances of retaliation and political decision-making and asserted that not conducting an investigation would mean these "actions could be perceived as a part of this administration’s broader pattern of not only discounting the value of federal employees, but suppressing, undermining, discounting, and wholesale ignoring scientific data produced by their own qualified scientists."

== Bailout ==
On October 1, 2008, Feinstein voted in favor of the Emergency Economic Stabilization Act.

== Cabinet appointments ==
In November 2007, Feinstein was one of only six Democrats to vote to confirm Michael Mukasey as U.S. Attorney General.

== Campaign reform ==
In January 2016, Feinstein was one of 29 senators to sign a letter to President Obama urging him to issue a final executive order that would require federal contractors to disclose political donations, arguing that form of disclosure was "a modest step that would expose an especially troubling type of secret money: campaign contributions that have the potential to influence government contracting practices."

== Child care ==
In 2019, Feinstein and 34 other senators introduced the Child Care for Working Families Act, a bill that created 770,000 new child care jobs and that ensured families under 75 percent of the state median income did not pay for child care with higher earning families having to pay "their fair share for care on a sliding scale, regardless of the number of children they have." The legislation also supported universal access to high-quality preschool programs for all 3 and 4-year-olds and gave the child care workforce a changed compensation and training to aid both teachers and caregivers.

== Copyright ==
Feinstein had supported Hollywood and the content industry when it had come into conflict with technology and fair use on intellectual property issues. In 2006, she co-sponsored the "PERFORM Act", or the "Platform Equality and Remedies for Rights Holders in Music Act of 2006", in the Senate, which would require satellite, cable and internet broadcasters to incorporate digital rights management technologies into their transmission. Over-the-air broadcasting would not be affected.

== Criminal justice reform ==
In December 2018, Feinstein voted for the First Step Act, legislation aimed at reducing recidivism rates among federal prisoners through expanding job training and other programs in addition to forming an expansion of early-release programs and modifications on sentencing laws such as mandatory minimum sentences for nonviolent drug offenders, "to more equitably punish drug offenders."

== Death penalty ==
Feinstein supported capital punishment for most of her career, but shifted towards opposition in 2018.

== Disaster relief ==
In March 2019, Feinstein was one of 11 senators to sign a letter to congressional leaders urging them to "bring legislation providing disaster supplemental appropriations to your respective floors for consideration immediately" after noting that the previous year had seen 124 federal disaster declarations approved for states, territories, and tribal nations across the U.S.

== Drug policy ==
In December 2018, Feinstein was one of 21 senators to sign a letter to Food and Drugs Commissioner Scott Gottlieb stating their approval of the actions of the Food and Drugs Administration (FDA) to hinder youth access to e-cigarettes and urging the FDA "to take additional, stronger steps to prevent and reduce e-cigarette use among youth."

== Education ==
In March 2019, Feinstein was one of 13 senators to sign a letter to U.S. Secretary of Education Betsy Devos calling for the Education Department to do more to assist Argosy University students as they faced campus closures across the U.S. and critiquing the Education Department as failing to provide adequate measures to protect students or keep them notified of ongoing updates.

== Environment ==
Feinstein and Senator Alan Cranston worked for over 10 years to pass the California Desert Protection Act. The bill was signed into law by President Bill Clinton in 1994. The bill protected 7,661,089 acres (31,003 km^{2}) of California's desert lands as wilderness and national parks. The Act doubled the size of the National Wilderness Preservation System in California, and was the largest wilderness bill in California's history.

Senators Feinstein and Barbara Boxer were the champions of the Northern California Coastal Wild Heritage Wilderness Act, which was signed into law by President George W. Bush on October 17, 2006. The bill protected 275,830 acres (1,116 km^{2}) of federal land as wilderness, and 21 miles (34 km) of stream as a wild and scenic river, including such popular areas as the King Range and Cache Creek. Senators Feinstein and Boxer worked with Representative Mike Thompson, the sponsor of the bill in the House, in the 5-year effort to pass the legislation.

Feinstein, along with her colleague Boxer, voted in favor of subsidy payments to conventional commodity farm producers, at the cost of subsidies for conservation-oriented farming. Later, Feinstein had not taken a stand on the widely criticized subsidies in the 2007 U.S. Farm Bill.

In November 2018, Feinstein was one of 25 Democratic senators to cosponsor a resolution specifying key findings of the Intergovernmental Panel On Climate Change report and National Climate Assessment. The resolution affirmed the senators' acceptance of the findings and their support for bold action toward addressing climate change.

In June 2019, Feinstein was one of 44 senators to introduce the International Climate Accountability Act, legislation that would prevent President Trump from using funds in an attempt to withdraw from the Paris Agreement and directing the president's administration to instead develop a strategic plan for the United States that would allow it to meet its commitment under the Paris Agreement.

Feinstein had declined to back the Green New Deal proposed by representative Ocasio Cortez.

== Foreign affairs ==
In December 2010, Feinstein voted for the ratification of New Start, a nuclear arms reduction treaty between the United States and Russian Federation obliging both countries to have no more than 1,550 strategic warheads as well as 700 launchers deployed during the next seven years along with providing a continuation of on-site inspections that halted when START I expired the previous year. It was the first arms treaty with Russia in eight years.

In June 2017, Feinstein voted for a resolution by Rand Paul and Chris Murphy that would block President Trump's 510 million sale of precision-guided munitions to Saudi Arabia that made up a portion of the 110 billion arms sale Trump announced during his visit to Saudi Arabia the previous year.

In March 2018, Feinstein voted against tabling a resolution spearheaded by Bernie Sanders, Chris Murphy, and Mike Lee that would have required President Trump to withdraw American troops either in or influencing Yemen within the next 30 days unless they were combating Al-Qaeda.

In a December 2018 letter to Senate Majority Leader Mitch McConnell and Minority Leader Chuck Schumer, Feinstein and Bernie Sanders advocated against a provision of a spending package barring companies from endorsing anti-Israel boycotts promoted by governmental groups, writing that while they did not support "the Boycott, Divestment and Sanctions (BDS) movement, we remain resolved to our constitutional oath to defend the right of every American to express their views peacefully without fear of or actual punishment by the government."

In March 2019, Feinstein was one of nine Democratic senators to sign a letter to Salman of Saudi Arabia requesting the release of human rights lawyer Waleed Abu al-Khair and writer Raif Badawi, women's rights activists Loujain al-Hathloul and Samar Badawi, and Dr. Walid Fitaih. The senators wrote, "Not only have reputable international organizations detailed the arbitrary detention of peaceful activists and dissidents without trial for long periods, but the systematic discrimination against women, religious minorities and mistreatment of migrant workers and others has also been well-documented."

In April 2019, Feinstein was one of thirty-four senators to sign a letter to President Trump encouraging him "to listen to members of your own Administration and reverse a decision that will damage our national security and aggravate conditions inside Central America", asserting that Trump had "consistently expressed a flawed understanding of U.S. foreign assistance" since becoming president and that he was "personally undermining efforts to promote U.S. national security and economic prosperity" through preventing the use of Fiscal Year 2018 national security funding. The senators argued that foreign assistance to Central American countries created less migration to the U.S., citing the funding's helping to improve conditions in those countries.

=== China ===
Feinstein supported a conciliatory approach between China and Taiwan and fostered increased dialogue between high-level Chinese representatives and U.S. senators during her first term as senator. When asked about her relation with Beijing, Feinstein said,

I sometimes say that in my last life maybe I was Chinese.

Feinstein had criticized Beijing's missile tests near Taiwan and has called for dismantlement of missiles pointed at the island. She promoted stronger business ties between China and Taiwan over confrontation, and suggested that the U.S. patiently "use two-way trade across Taiwan Strait as a platform for more political dialogue and closer ties."

She believed that deeper cross-strait economic integration "will one day lead to political integration and will ultimately provide the solution" to the Taiwan issue.

In November 2017, in response to efforts by China to purchase tech companies based in the US, Feinstein was one of nine senators to cosponsor a bill that would broaden the federal government's ability to prevent foreign purchases of U.S. firms through increasing the strength of the Committee on Foreign Investment in the United States (CFIUS). The scope of the CFIUS would be expanded to allow it to review along with possibly decline smaller investments and add additional national security factors for CFIUS to consider including if information about Americans would be exposed as part of transactions or whether the deal would facilitate fraud.

On July 27, 2018, reports surfaced that a Chinese staff member who worked as Feinstein's personal driver, gofer and liaison to the Asian-American community for 20 years, was caught reporting to China's Ministry of State Security. According to the reports, Feinstein was contacted by the FBI five years ago warning her about the suspected employee. The employee was later interviewed by authorities and forced to retire by Feinstein. No criminal charges were filed against the individual.

=== Iran ===
In July 2015, Feinstein announced her support for the Iran nuclear deal framework, tweeting that the deal would usher in "unprecedented & intrusive inspections to verify cooperation" on the part of Iran.

On June 7, 2017, Feinstein and Senator Bernie Sanders issued dual statements urging the Senate to forgo a vote for sanctions on Iran in response to the Tehran attacks that occurred earlier in the day.

In May 2018, Feinstein was one of twelve senators to sign a letter to President Trump urging him to remain in the Iran nuclear deal on the grounds that "Iran could either remain in the agreement and seek to isolate the United States from our closest partners, or resume its nuclear activities" if the US pulled out and that both possibilities "would be detrimental to our national security interests."

=== Iraq ===
Feinstein supported the Iraq war resolution in the vote of October 11, 2002; she has since claimed that she was misled by President Bush on the reasons for going to war. However, former UN Weapons Inspector in Iraq Scott Ritter has stated that Feinstein in summer 2002 acknowledged to him that she knew the Bush administration had not provided any convincing intelligence to back up its claims about the Iraqi weapons of mass destruction.

In February 2007, Feinstein warned Republicans not to block consideration of a measure opposing President Bush's troop increase in Iraq, saying it would be a "terrible mistake" to prevent debate on the top issue in America.

In May 2007, Feinstein voted for an Emergency Supplemental Appropriations bill, which continued to fund the Iraq occupation without a firm timetable for withdrawal. The Senator said, "I am deeply disappointed that this bill fails to hold the President accountable for his Administration's flawed Iraq War policy. The American people have made their voices clear that there must be an exit strategy for Iraq. Yet this President continues to stubbornly adhere to more of the same."

=== Israel ===
In November 2017, Feinstein was one of ten Democratic senators to sign a letter urging Prime Minister of Israel Benjamin Netanyahu to halt the planned demolitions of Palestinian villages Khan al-Ahmar and Susiya on the grounds that such action would further diminish efforts to seek a two-state solution and "endanger Israel's future as a Jewish democracy."

In April 2019, following the Trump administration not distributing money to West Bank and Gaza, Feinstein was one of six Democratic senators to introduce a resolution restoring US humanitarian aid to Palestinians in the West Bank and Gaza. Feinstein said in a statement, "President Trump’s refusal to provide humanitarian aid to the Palestinian people is a strategic mistake. Denying funding for clean water, health care and schools in the West Bank and Gaza won’t make us safer. Instead it only emboldens extremist groups like Hamas and pushes peace further out of reach."

=== North Korea ===
In July 2017, during an appearance on Face the Nation after North Korea conducted a second test of an intercontinental ballistic missile, Feinstein said the country had proven itself to be a danger to the US and stated her disappointment with the lack of response from China.

On August 8, 2017, in response to reports that North Korea had achieved successful miniaturization of nuclear warheads, Feinstein issued a statement insisting isolation of North Korea had proven ineffective and President Trump's rhetoric was not aiding in the resolve of potential conflict, additionally calling for the US to "quickly engage North Korea in a high-level dialogue without any preconditions".

In September 2017, following President Trump delivering his first speech to the United Nations General Assembly in which he threatened North Korea, Feinstein released a statement disagreeing with his remarks: "Trump's bombastic threat to destroy North Korea and his refusal to present any positive pathways forward on the many global challenges we face are severe disappointments."

== Free speech ==
Feinstein was the main Democratic sponsor of the failed 2006 constitutional Flag Desecration Amendment.

Feinstein voted for the McCain–Feingold campaign finance reform legislation.

In 2007, Feinstein was asked in a Fox News interview whether she would revive the Fairness Doctrine, and she replied that she was looking at it.

In 2010, Feinstein voted in favor of unilateral US censorship of the Internet by voting in favor of COICA. Also in 2010, Feinstein said in reference to Cablegate, "Whoever released this information should be punished severely."

In 2013, Feinstein called for the immediate extradition and arrest of Edward Snowden, the whistleblower who leaked information about the PRISM surveillance program.

== Railroad safety ==
In June 2019, Feinstein was one of ten senators to cosponsor the Safe Freight Act, a bill that would mandate all freight trains have one or more certified conductors and one certified engineer on board who can collaborate on how to protect both the train and people living near the tracks' safety. The legislation was meant to correct a rollback of the Federal Railroad Administration on a proposed rule intended to establish safety standards.

== Government shutdown ==
In March 2019, Feinstein and thirty-eight other senators signed a letter to the Appropriations Committee opining that contractor workers and by extension their families "should not be penalized for a government shutdown that they did nothing to cause" while noting that there were bills in both chambers of Congress that if enacted would provide back pay to compensate contractor employees for lost wages before urging the Appropriations Committee "to include back pay for contractor employees in a supplemental appropriations bill for FY2019 or as part of the regular appropriations process for FY2020."

== Gun politics ==
Feinstein had experienced two assassination attempts as a member of the San Francisco Board of Supervisors, in which Mayor George Moscone and Supervisor Harvey Milk were killed while in office. In 1993, Feinstein, along with then-Representative Chuck Schumer (D-NY) and Massachusetts Senator Ted Kennedy (who lost two of his brothers to assassination), led the fight to ban many semi-automatic firearms deemed assault weapons and restrict the sale of high capacity magazines. The ban was passed as part of the Violent Crime Control and Law Enforcement Act of 1994.

In 2004, when the ban was set to expire, Feinstein sponsored a 10-year extension of the ban as an amendment to the Protection of Lawful Commerce in Arms Act; while the amendment was successfully added, the act itself failed. The act was then revived in 2005, and, despite Feinstein's efforts, was passed without an extension of the assault weapons ban. In response to the Sandy Hook School massacre, Sen. Feinstein re-introduced legislation to reinstate the ban on assault weapons, as well as many more restrictions.

Discussing why the 1994 act only prohibited the manufacture or import of assault weapons, instead of the possession and sale of them, Feinstein said on CBS-TV's 60 Minutes, "If I could have gotten 51 votes in the Senate of the United States for an outright ban, picking up every one of them—Mr. and Mrs. America, turn 'em all in—I would have done it. I could not do that. The votes weren't here."

In July 2006, Feinstein voted against the Vitter Amendment which prohibited the use of federal funds for the confiscation of lawfully-owned firearms during a disaster.

On April 27, 1995, at a Senate Judiciary Committee hearing on "Terrorism in the United States", Feinstein stated that - in the early 1970s - she applied for, and received, a license to carry a concealed gun after she and her family were threatened and their house physically attacked by a local terrorist group named the New World Liberation Front. As Feinstein stated to the Senate panel:

"I want to just give you a personal anecdote about terrorism, because less than 20 years ago, I was the target of a terrorist group. It was the New World Liberation Front. They blew up power stations and put a bomb at my home when my husband was dying of cancer. And the bomb was set to detonate at two o'clock in the morning, but it was a construction explosive that doesn't detonate when it drops below freezing. It doesn't usually freeze in San Francisco, but on this night, it dropped below freezing, and the bomb didn't detonate. I was very lucky. But, I thought of what might have happened. Later the same group shot out all the windows of my home.
And, I know the sense of helplessness that people feel. I know the urge to arm yourself, because that's what I did. I was trained in firearms. I'd walk to the hospital when my husband was sick. I carried a concealed weapon. I made the determination that if somebody was going to try to take me out, I was going to take them with me.
Now having said all of that, that was a period of time ago, and I've watched through these 20 years as terrorism has increased, both on the far extremist left and the far extremist right in this country, and in particularly in my state--I never thought I would live in a country where we would have to put out a bomb summary every year, but we do, today."

Feinstein says she surrendered the permit in 1982, once the New World Liberation Front was no longer a threat to her. Also in 1982, she presented the Pope with a metal cross made from 15 melted-down firearms, including her own revolver, that were turned in during a gun buyback program in San Francisco.

In January 2013, Feinstein, along with Representative Carolyn McCarthy from New York, proposed a bill that would "ban the sale, transfer, manufacturing, or importation of 150 specific firearms, including semi-automatic rifles or pistols that can be used with a detachable or fixed ammunition magazines that hold more than 10 rounds and have specific military-style features, including pistol grips, grenade launchers or rocket launchers". The bill has an exemption for 900 specific models of guns that are used in hunting and for sport. Feinstein commented on the issue saying, "Massacres have taken place in businesses, law practices, malls, movie theaters, and especially schools. These massacres don't seem to stop, they continue on. Columbine, Virginia Tech, Aurora, Tuson, and Oak Creek. The common thread in each of these shootings is the gunman used a semi-automatic assault weapon or large capacity ammunition magazines. Military assault weapons only have one purpose and in my opinion, it's for the military."

In January 2016, Feinstein was one of eighteen senators to sign a letter to Thad Cochran and Barbara Mikulski requesting that the Labor, Health and Education subcommittee hold a hearing on whether to allow the Centers for Disease Control and Prevention (CDC) to fund a study of gun violence and "the annual appropriations rider that some have interpreted as preventing it" with taxpayer dollars. The senators noted their support for taking steps "to fund gun-violence research, because only the United States government is in a position to establish an integrated public-health research agenda to understand the causes of gun violence and identify the most effective strategies for prevention."

In response to the 2016 Orlando nightclub shooting, Feinstein called it a "terrible terrorist attack", and offered to work with federal agencies to provide resources.

Following the Las Vegas shooting in October 2017, Feinstein was one of twenty-four senators to sign a letter to National Institutes of Health Director Dr. Francis Collins espousing the view that it was critical the NIH "dedicate a portion of its resources to the public health consequences of gun violence" at a time when 93 Americans die per day from gun-related fatalities and noted that the Dickey Amendment did not prohibit objective, scientific inquiries into shooting death prevention.

In January 2019, Feinstein was one of forty senators to introduce the Background Check Expansion Act, a bill that would require background checks for either the sale or transfer of all firearms including all unlicensed sellers. Exceptions to the bill's background check requirement included transfers between members of law enforcement, loaning firearms for either hunting or sporting events on a temporary basis, providing firearms as gifts to members of one's immediate family, firearms being transferred as part of an inheritance, or giving a firearm to another person temporarily for immediate self-defense.

In February 2019, Feinstein was one of thirty-eight senators to sign a letter to Senate Judiciary Committee Chairman Lindsey Graham calling on him to "hold a hearing" on universal background checks and noted Graham's statement in the press that he "intended to have the Committee work on ‘red flag’ legislation and potentially also background checks, both actions" the senators indicated their support for.

In June 2019, Feinstein was one of four senators to cosponsor the Help Empower Americans to Respond (HEAR) Act, legislation that would ban suppressors from being imported, sold, made, sent elsewhere or possessed and grant a suppressor buyback program as well as include certain exceptions for current and former law enforcement personnel and others. The bill was intended to respond to the Virginia Beach shooting, where the perpetrator used a suppressor.

== Health care ==
Feinstein had supported the Affordable Care Act, repeatedly voting to defeat initiatives aimed against it.

Feinstein had voted in favor of regulating tobacco as a drug; expanding the Children's Health Insurance Program; overriding a presidential veto on adding two to four million children to SCHIP eligibility; increasing the Medicaid rebate for producing generic drugs; negotiating bulk purchases for Medicare prescription drugs; allowing re-importation of Rx drugs from Canada; allowing patients to sue HMOs and collect punitive damages; including prescription drugs under Medicare; and Medicare means-testing. She had voted against the Paul Ryan Budget's Medicare choice and against allowing tribal Indians to opt out of federal health care.

At an April 2017 town hall meeting in San Francisco, Feinstein stated, "If single-payer health care is going to mean the complete takeover by the government of all health care, I am not there."

== Housing ==
In April 2019, Feinstein was one of forty-one senators to sign a bipartisan letter to the housing subcommittee praising the United States Department of Housing and Urban Development's Section 4 Capacity Building program as authorizing "HUD to partner with national nonprofit community development organizations to provide education, training, and financial support to local community development corporations (CDCs) across the country" and expressing disappointment that President Trump's budget "has slated this program for elimination after decades of successful economic and community development." The senators wrote of their hope that the subcommittee would support continued funding for Section 4 in Fiscal Year 2020.

== Immigration ==
Feinstein was a supporter and co-sponsor of the H-1B Visa program. After strongly opposing the AgJobs immigration provisions in 2005, warning that they would encourage illegal immigration from Mexico, she reversed her position, when the measures were proposed again, in 2008.

In September 2017, after Attorney General Jeff Sessions announced the rescinding of the Deferred Action for Childhood Arrivals program, Feinstein admitted the legality of the program was questionable while citing this as a reason for why a law should be passed.

In January 2018, in her opening remarks to a Senate Judiciary Committee hearing, Feinstein said she was concerned there might be racial motivation in the choice by the Trump administration to terminate the temporary protected status, based on comments he made denigrating African countries as well as Haiti and El Salvador.

In August 2018, Feinstein was one of 17 senators to sign a letter to United States Secretary of Homeland Security Kirstjen Nielsen demanding that the Trump administration take immediate action in attempting to reunite 539 migrant children with their families, citing each passing day of inaction as intensifying "trauma that this administration has needlessly caused for children and their families seeking humanitarian protection."

In March 2019, Feinstein voted to block President Trump's national emergency declaration that would have granted him access to $3.6 billion in military construction funding to build border barriers.

== Infrastructure ==
In February 2019, Feinstein was one of 11 senators to sign a letter to Energy Secretary Rick Perry and Homeland Security Secretary Kirstjen Nielsen urging them "to work with all federal, state and local regulators, as well as the hundreds of independent power producers and electricity distributors nation-wide to ensure our systems are protected" and affirming that they were "ready and willing to provide any assistance you need to secure our critical electricity infrastructure."

== Intelligence programs and NSA programs ==
In 2005, Feinstein voted along the GOP to renew 14 of the 16 expiring provisions of the Patriot Act and make them permanent.

In June 2012, Feinstein said that the "avalanche of leaks" occurring in relation to U.S. intelligence affairs was "very, very disturbing. You know, it's dismayed our allies. It puts American lives in jeopardy. It puts our nation's security in jeopardy".

Together with other heads of congressional oversight, Feinstein vowed to stop leaks. One week later, she co-sponsored, with Senator Saxby Chambliss, S. 3314: A bill to specifically authorize certain funds for an intelligence or intelligence-related activity and for other purposes. It is not known if this bill is related to the leak-stopping exercise.

After the 2013 mass surveillance disclosures involving operations by the National Security Agency (NSA), Feinstein took measures to continue the collection programs. Foreign Policy wrote that she had a "reputation as a staunch defender of NSA practices and the White House's refusal to stand by collection activities targeting foreign leaders". In October 2013, she criticized the NSA for monitoring telephone calls of foreign leaders friendly to the US. In November 2013, she promoted the Fisa Improvements Act bill, which included a "backdoor search provision" that allows intelligence agencies to continue certain warrantless searches as long as they are logged and "available for review" to various agencies.

In June 2013, Feinstein labeled Edward Snowden a traitor after his leaks went public. In October of that year, Feinstein stated that she stood by her labeling.

On November 12, 2013, Feinstein introduced the Intelligence Authorization Act for Fiscal Year 2014 (S. 1681; 113th Congress). The bill would authorize appropriations for fiscal year 2014 for intelligence activities of the U.S. government. The bill would authorize there to be funding for intelligence agencies such as the Central Intelligence Agency or the National Security Agency, but a separate appropriations bill would also have to pass in order for those agencies to receive any money. Feinstein said that "Congress has a responsibility to ensure the DNI and other intelligence leaders have the resources and flexibility they need to protect the nation."

== LGBT issues ==
Mayor Feinstein vetoed domestic partnership legislation in 1982. This legislation would have provided insurance benefits to cohabitating lovers of city employees.

Feinstein introduced a bill to repeal the Defense of Marriage Act, the Respect for Marriage Act, in the 112th Congress. The bill was passed out of the Senate Judiciary Committee on November 10, 2011.

She introduced a private bill to keep together a bi-national same-sex couple.

In September 2014, Feinstein was one of 69 members of the US House and Senate to sign a letter to then-FDA commissioner Sylvia Burwell requesting that the FDA revise its policy banning donation of corneas and other tissues by men who have had sex with another man in the preceding 5 years.

== Opioids ==
In February 2017, Feinstein and 30 other senators signed a letter to Kaléo Pharmaceuticals in response to the opioid-overdose-reversing device Evzio rising in price from $690 in 2014 to $4,500 and requested the company answer what the detailed price structure for Evzio was, the number of devices Kaléo Pharmaceuticals set aside for donation, and the totality of federal reimbursements Evzio received in the previous year.

In March 2017, Feinstein was one of 21 senators to sign a letter led by Ed Markey to Senate Majority Leader Mitch McConnell which noted that 12 percent of adult Medicaid beneficiaries had some form or a substance abuse disorder in addition to one third of treatment administered for opioid and other substance use disorders in the United States being financed through Medicaid and opined that the American Health Care Act could "very literally translate into a death spiral for those with opioid use disorders" due to the insurance coverage lacking and not having the adequate funds to afford care oftentimes resulting in individuals abandoning substance use disorder treatment.

== Trade ==
In May 2011, Feinstein was one of 17 senators to sign a letter to Commodity Futures Trading Commission Chairman Gary Gensler requesting a regulatory crackdown on speculative Wall Street trading in oil contracts, asserting that they had entered "a time of economic emergency for many American families" while noting that the average retail price of regular grade gasoline was $3.95 nationwide. The senators requested that the CFTC adopt speculation limits in regard to markets where contracts for future delivery of oil are traded.

In February 2019, during ongoing disputes between the United States and China on trade, Feinstein was one of 10 senators to sign a bipartisan letter to Homeland Security Secretary Kirstjen Nielsen and Energy Secretary Rick Perry asserting that the American government "should consider a ban on the use of Huawei inverters in the United States and work with state and local regulators to raise awareness and mitigate potential threats" and urged them "to work with all federal, state and local regulators, as well as the hundreds of independent power producers and electricity distributors nation-wide to ensure our systems are protected."

== Truck underride crashes ==
In March 2019, Feinstein was a cosponsor of the Stop Underrides Act, a bill that would require underride guards on both the sides and front of a truck in addition to changing standards for underride guards on the back of trucks.

== USA PATRIOT Act ==
Feinstein was the original Democratic co-sponsor of a bill to extend the USA PATRIOT Act. In a December 2005 statement, Feinstein stated, "I believe the Patriot Act is vital to the protection of the American people."

Feinstein proposed an amendment to the Patriot Act would have explicitly excluded U.S. citizens from the detention authority created by the Authorization for the Use of Military Force passed just after the September 11 attacks in 2001. The amendment failed 45–55.

Though her amendment was defeated, the compromised amendment, passed 99–1, affirmed that nothing in the NDAA is intended to alter the government's current legal authority to detain prisoners captured in the war on terror.

== Victims' rights ==
In the 1990s, Feinstein was one of the original sponsors, along with Republican Senator Jon Kyl, of an effort to amend the United States Constitution to protect victims' rights in trial. Though the constitutional amendment ultimately failed, Senators Kyl and Feinstein authored the 2004 Scott Campbell, Stephanie Roper, Wendy Preston, Louarna Gillis, and Nila Lynn Crime Victims' Rights Act, which listed a victims' bill of rights and provided mandamus relief in appellate court for any victim denied those rights. The act also offered sanctions against government officials who wantonly and willfully refused to comply with the Crime Victims' Rights Act. Both Senators Kyl and Feinstein described their collaboration as a high point of bi-partisan collaboration in their careers. In front of the Senate, Senator Kyl said, "This legislation would not be before us today without Senator Feinstein. That is simply a fact. For all of the hard work we have put in with her cooperation and her commitment to this, I thank Senator Feinstein deeply. She knows that bond of trust will continue to exist between us."

== Wiretapping ==
In August 2007, Feinstein joined Republicans in the Senate in voting to modify the Foreign Intelligence Surveillance Act (FISA) by narrowing the scope of its protections to sharply alter the legal limits on the government's ability to monitor phone calls and email messages of American citizens. Feinstein voted to give the attorney general and the director of national intelligence the power to approve international surveillance of the communications of Americans entirely within the executive branch, rather than through the special intelligence court established by FISA. Many privacy advocates have decried this law and Feinstein's vote in favor of it. In February 2008, Feinstein joined Republicans in the Senate in voting against removing the provisions that provided immunity from civil liability to electronic communication service providers for certain assistance (most notably, access without warrants to fiber-optic cables carrying bulk transmissions for the purposes of interception and monitoring) provided to the Government.

== Congressional scorecards ==
- Profile at Vote Smart
