= Revolutionary Cells =

Revolutionary Cells may mean:

- Revolutionary Cells – Animal Liberation Brigade, an animal liberation activist group
- Revolutionary Cells (Argentina), an anarcho-communist urban guerilla group
- Revolutionary Cells (German group), a German left-wing terrorist group
- Revolutionary Nuclei, a Greek left-wing terrorist group also known as Revolutionary Cells
- Armed Revolutionary Nuclei an Italian right-wing terrorist group
