= Women's social and revolutionary activism in 20th century El Salvador =

Women's social and revolutionary activism in El Salvador during the 20th century emerged in response to the human rights violations, political oppression, and authoritarianism practiced under the numerous military regimes. During the cycles of military rule that controlled the country from 1931 to 1979, the population of El Salvador experienced political repression, state violence against working-class and rural communities, and socioeconomic inequalities. This combination of social factors created conditions that pushed women into participating in social and revolutionary movements. During the final military cycles, women's activism intensified through participation in social activism through human rights organizations, most notably the CoMadres, then later on revolutionary activism in the Farabundo Martí National Liberation Front (FMLN). Women played a significant role in both social and political movements in El Salvador during military rule in the 20th century.

== Historical background ==
=== Beginning of military rule in El Salvador, 20th century ===
During most of the 20th century, El Salvador was governed by a series of successive militaristic regimes that imposed authoritarian rule, often employing state-sanctioned violence to suppress opposition and promote the regimes' interests. This period of military-based rule began in 1931, following the overthrow of President Arturo Araujo by a group of military officers. After the coup, General Hernández Martínez came to power and became the President of El Salvador, marking the beginning of multiple decades of military-based authoritarian rule by successive regimes.

General Hernández Martínez took power in 1931, marking the beginning of the military regime cycles that governed El Salvador. His administration consolidated authority through the military institution and reinforced the military regime's relationship with the existing coffee-exporting elite. This contributed to the socioeconomic inequalities experienced by El Salvadorans during this period of time, particularly rural civilians. His regime also employed state violence against the population to suppress threats to the regime, most notably seen in the Rebellion of 1932 (La Matanza). In the Rebellion of 1932, the military violently suppressed a rebellion that consisted mostly of indigenous peasants in the Western and Central coffee-producing regions of the country, led by the Communist Party of El Salvador (PCS) but pursuing their own socioeconomic grievances. The successive military regimes that followed the resignation of Martínez in 1944 continued employing authoritarian, military-enforced rule and state-sanctioned violence against civilians.

=== Women's social activism (CoMadres) ===
The final regime under General Carlos Humberto Romero (1977-1979) continued repression of the left-wing, state-sanctioned violence, and intensified disappearances of civilians. This led to mass demonstrations and protests in El Salvador. The Committee of Mothers and Relatives of Prisoners, the Disappeared and the Assassinated of El Salvador (CoMadres) emerged in 1977 in response to the disappearances of people by the military regime in power.

The CoMadres was one of the most well-known women's social and human rights movement in El Salvador during this period of time. The group was founded by mothers who were members of Christian communities, that organized together under the guidance of the Archdiocese of Monseñor Romero as they searched for their disappeared children and relatives. The CoMadres participated in social activism through public demonstrations, such as marching dressed in white headscarves, as well as occupying governmental buildings like the Salvadoran Red Cross, and international organizations like the Organization of American States (OAS) and the United Nations. The CoMadres used social activism to pressure the military regime and protest its authoritarian rule and disappearances of people.

Despite intensified repression of human rights movements by the military regime, the CoMadres continued their social activism throughout the late 1970s, representing the significant role of women in social activism under military rule.

==== Motivation for women's participation in CoMadres ====
Women primarily participated in the CoMadres in response to the disappearances of relatives by El Salvadoran security forces in the late 1970s. Many of the participants were mothers who were part of Church-based Christian communities and experienced the disappearance of a child. The denial of responsibility for the disappearances by the government of El Salvador further encouraged social activism amongst women. The experience of state terror and the denial of responsibility by the Salvadoran government pushed women into social activism as a way to address these issues, establishing the CoMadres as one of the most well-known social activism groups in El Salvador.

=== Women's revolutionary activism (FMLN) ===
Women in El Salvador had an important role in revolutionary activism during the 20th century, primarily seen through significant participation in the Farabundo Martí National Liberation Front (FMLN), founded in 1980. The FMLN was formed through the merging of five parties in response to the previous decades of repression under the military regimes. During this period of time, many women who had been affected by the previous military regimes joined the FMLN to combat political repression among other socioeconomic reasons. Thirty percent of FMLN combatants, and sixty percent of those providing logistical support, were women. Women constituted a significant portion of the FMLN's total membership.

Women's roles in the FMLN were diverse. Besides combatants and logistical support such as transporting weapons, women had jobs in radio communications, medical care for the wounded, and engaging in political and diplomatic work on behalf of the FMLN. The roles that women played in the FMLN were diverse and contributed to the movement in different aspects.

Women's activism in the FMLN challenged traditional gender norms as women participated in the same combat, political, and logistical roles as men. However, women still experienced more barriers in attaining leadership roles and often struggled to gain recognition from male members.

Women's activism through involvement in the Farabundo Martí National Liberation Front constituted a significant part of the revolutionary efforts in El Salvador that arose as a result of the socioeconomic conditions during and following the end of military rule. The participation of women in the FMLN represented the significant role of women in revolutionary movements during 20th century El Salvador.

==== Motivation for women's participation in the FMLN ====
Women's participation in the FMLN was driven by state repression, shaped by the context of the El Salvadoran Civil War and the military rule preceding it. Many women joined the FMLN to resist state violence and assert their autonomy after a history of political and social repression by the military regimes. The FMLN also recruited students who were active in organizing against the government. The FMLN included both working-class women and students, giving them diverse roles in logistics, medical care, politics, combat, and more within the movement. Women joined the FMLN through different pathways influenced by state repression, community and political organizing and student activism in response to decades of military rule and repression.

== Legacy ==
Women's social and revolutionary activism during 20th century El Salvador under military rule contributed to grassroots mobilization and the development of human rights organizations such as the CoMadres, as well as the substantial participation of women in the Farabundo Martí National Liberation Front (FMLN) across different roles. The CoMadres helped to gain national and international awareness about the human rights violations committed under the military regimes, while women in the FMLN contributed to the political landscape of El Salvador. Women's involvement in these movements helped shape domestic politics, address societal issues, and influence discussions on gender roles.
