= CIPLA (disambiguation) =

CIPLA may refer to:

- Chemical, Industrial and Pharmaceutical Laboratories or CIPLA, an Indian pharmaceutical company
- Iconoclastic Caravans for Free Will, an anarchist group in Chile
