= Vandalika Teodoro Suárez Gang =

- Pandilla Vandalika Teodoro Suárez
- Dates active: March 30, 2010–December 2011
- Country: Argentina
- Headquarters: Buenos Aires
- Ideology: Egoist anarchism Individualist anarchism, Insurrectionary anarchism Anarchism without adjectives Anti-imperialism; Anti-capitalism; Illegalism; Internationalism
- Political position: Post-left
- Status: Dissolved

The Vandalika Teodoro Suárez Gang was an Argentine urban guerrilla group active in the metropolitan area of Buenos Aires, from 2010 to 2011, where it launched attacks on banks and offices belonging to private companies.

== Activity ==
On March 30, 2010, the group claimed responsibility for an explosion against a Banco Nación branch in Calle Lavalle, Buenos Aires. The attack did not leave any injuries, only material damage to the branch building. On August 27, the group together with Asociadxs autonomxs independientes levemente deskiciadxs planted an explosive in a branch of Banco Francés, in the Almagrov neighborhood when a call warned that there was a suspicious backpack next to the blindex door of the Banco Francés around 6:00, the notice was made to the Explosives Firefighters Brigade of the Federal Police. The explosives experts decided to detonate the backpack, which contained a bomb with a clockwork mechanism inside. The shock wave caused the bank's blindex to break and the windows of some neighboring buildings to shatter, causing no harm to anyone. Leaflets were found at the site of the explosion.

On September 16, 2010, an explosion occurred in front of the adjacent offices of American Airlines and Alitalia in Buenos Aires. The pamphlets found at the site contained slogans demanding freedom for alleged political prisoners in Chile and autonomy for the Mapuche, in the context of the Mapuche conflict. The attack was one of the most high-profile ones carried out by the group. On December 20 of the same year, an explosion was registered inside a branch of Banco Francés, in the Retiro neighborhood, at 3:50 a.m., the explosion caused significant damage to the front of the credit institution and neighboring buildings, although no people were injured. This attack was the group's seventh explosive attack against a bank in 2011.

On July 25, 2011, an explosive device detonated in front of the mutual building for retired NCOs of the Argentine Federal Police, in the Parque Chacabuco neighborhood of Buenos Aires. Gendarmerie personnel were at the scene analyzing the device and the possible causes of the explosion, according to the information given, the authorities reported that the explosion occurred at 2:30 a.m. m., and no injuries were reported.

Years later, on February 11, 2016, an explosive device was deactivated by sappers belonging to the GOPE, being a media incident and being considered a terrorist incident by the Ministry of the Interior and Public Security. The Vandalika Teodoro Suárez Gang and the Antagonic Nuclei of the New Urban Guerrilla claimed the attack, threatening to carry out more.

=== Context ===
Between 2010 and 2013, anarchist groups claimed the largest campaign of political violence in recent Argentine history, without deaths or injuries, with attacks that reached police patrols, government and bank buildings and private property. The authorities attributed several small-scale attacks in the city against financial institutions and offices of prominent national and foreign companies to Chilean anarchist groups.

== See also ==
- Anarchism in Argentina
- Resistencia Libertaria
- Revolutionary Cells
