= Informal Anarchist Federation =

Anarchist guerrilla organization

- Founded: 2003
- Founding location: Italy
- Years active: 2003–present
- Activities: Bombings, arson attacks, shootings, sabotage, vandalism
- Allies: Conspiracy of Fire Nuclei

The Informal Anarchist Federation (FAI; Italian: Federazione Anarchica Informale) is an insurrectionary anarchist organization. It has been described by Italian intelligence sources as a horizontal structure of various anarchist groups, united in their beliefs in revolutionary armed action. Groups and individuals comprising the FAI act both as separate organizations and also under the FAI, and are known to work together. The FAI notably has similar aims and ideals to the Greek Conspiracy of Fire Nuclei (Synomosía ton Pyrínon tis Fotiás, or SPF), the two often working in solidarity with each other, and the SPF being known to announce solidarity with FAI in their communiques. Although the group started in Italy, it has committed attacks in other countries across the world since 2012. Consistent with insurrectionary anarchism, the FAI opposes capitalism, nationalism, and Marxism.

== Structure ==
The organization is composed of many groups over the world, including:

- July 20 Brigade
- International Solidarity
- Cooperative of Hand-Made Fire & Related Items
- May 22 Group
- Iniciativa Anarco-Insurreccionalista de Ofensiva y Solidaridad–Julio Chavez López/Federación Anarquista Informal
- Revenge Cell Mikhail Zhlobitsky
- Circle of Asymmetric Urban Warfare
- Santiago Maldonado cell (named after the Argentine Santiago Maldonado)
- Anarchic Cell for Revolutionary Solidarity
- Friends of the Earth
- Práxedis G. Guerrero Autonomous Cells of Immediate Revolution
- Mariano Sánchez Añón Insurrectional Cell

These groups represent factions of the FAI. Beyond the organization, each group has also forged its own set of alliances. Due to the organizational nature many of the groups have no materiel connection with each other. In 2012, an official of the Raggruppamento Operativo Speciale (ROS), the anti-organized crime branch of the Carabinieri, claimed that Italian intelligence had located the identities of at least fifty people belonging to the FAI, who are now in hiding.

== History ==
In 2003, the group claimed responsibility for a bomb campaign targeting several European Union (EU) institutions. It had stated to target "the apparatus of control that is repressive and leading the democratic show that is the new European order". To address the situation, an order was issued to halt all packets addressed to EU bodies from post offices in the Emilia-Romagna region. Sources at the prosecutor's office in Bologna said that the packages mailed to then European Central Bank president Jean-Claude Trichet and European Commission president Romano Prodi, as well as EU agencies Europol and Eurojust, contained books and photocopies of a leaflet from the FAI. The leaflet described the Italian group and talked about its "Operation Santa Claus". After the December attack on Prodi, the FAI sent a letter to La Repubblica saying it was opposed to the EU and claiming the attack was carried out "so the pig knows that the maneuvers have only begun to get close to him and others like him."

In 2010, Italy's postal service intercepted a threatening letter containing a bullet addressed to then Prime Minister Silvio Berlusconi. A large envelope containing a letter addressed to Berlusconi with the threat "you will end up like a rat" was discovered on Friday in a post office in the Libate suburb of the northern city of Milan. On 9 April 2013, an explosive device was sent by the group to the offices of La Stampa; it did not detonate. On 23 December 2010, credit for exploding parcels delivered to the Swiss and Chilean embassies in Rome was claimed by the FAI, although Italy's leading news agency ANSA erroneously reported that another group, the Italian Anarchist Federation, claimed responsibility for the mail bombs.

On 31 March 2011, a mail bomb exploded at the Olten headquarters of Swissnuclear, the Swiss nuclear industry association, wounding two people. According to prosecutors, a letter delivered with the bomb claimed responsibility on behalf of the FAI. A mail bomb, sent to Josef Ackermann, chief executive of Deutsche Bank, in Frankfurt am Main, was intercepted on 7 December 2011. On 13 June 2012, the Italian ROS under the name "Operation Ardire" conducted raids on forty people, arresting eight in Italy and sending two arrest warrants for individuals already incarcerated in Germany and Switzerland, Gabriel Pombo Da Silva and Marco Camenisch, as well as conducting multiple interrogations, some of which were in connection to the Conspiracy of Fire Nuclei. On 30 September 2020, The FAI cell Nucleus Mikhail Zhlobitsky claimed to have sent bombs to multiple locations across Italy. On 13 November 2025, the United States Department of State declared FAI to be a foreign terrorist group pursuant to NSPM-7.

=== Adinolfi shooting ===
On 7 May 2012, 53-year-old Roberto Adinolfi, CEO of the nuclear power company Ansaldo Nucleare, was attacked and wounded as he left his home in Genoa. He was shot in the knees by two men on a motorbike. The attackers fired three shots, fracturing Adinolfi's right knee. The action was claimed by a group calling itself "Olga Cell of the FAI/FRI" in a four-page communique sent to the Corriere della Sera. The cell takes its name from imprisoned SPF member Olga Ikonomidou, and had claimed several other attacks. The shooting and continued threats against the Italian state tax collection agency prompted the Italian Interior Minister Annamaria Cancellieri to assign 18,000 police officers to security detail following the attack. Two anarchists (Alfredo Cospito, aged 46, and Nicola Gai, aged 35) were arrested in Turin in mid September 2012 for the attack on Adinolfi. Cospito and Gai were sentenced In November 2013 to 10 years 8 months and 9 years, 4 months respectively for the attack which was assigned a terrorism designation by the court.

== International activity ==
Starting in the 2010s, several groups around the world used the FAI moniker to claim responsibility for their own attacks on government and corporate targets, including arson in Russia, Argentina, Indonesia, and the United Kingdom. In May 2012, FAI cells in the UK announced their intention to "paralyze the national economy" during the 2012 Summer Olympics in London. This warning followed an attack by the British based FAI cell May 22 Group on trainlines outside Bristol that succeeded in disrupting the rail system, and an arson attack against the Lord Mayor of Bristol Geoff Gollop. On 3 January 2013, an FAI group set fire to a transmitter in Bath, Somerset, resulting in television and radio outages to 80,000 homes. On 25 November 2014, a group calling itself the FAI Torches in the Night – Earth Liberation Front claimed responsibility for setting fires that destroyed 5 luxury cars in the Bristol suburb of Long Ashton.

On 29 May 2012, four Bolivian youths were arrested in connection with a dynamite attack on a Bolivian military barracks and the bombing of a car dealership throughout May. The FAI claimed responsibility for both incidents. During a security briefing regarding the FAI, an Italian intelligence official cited Greece, Spain, Mexico, and Chile as other countries in which the FAI was spreading networks into. The similarities in ideology between the Italian FAI and a Mexican group involved in a parcel bombing that seriously injured two nanotechnology researchers was noted elsewhere. In September 2012, an FAI group in Mexico claimed responsibility for the shooting deaths of three municipal police officers in Mexico City.

In addition, the FAI developed ideological ties with Greek anarchist groups. FAI cells have named themselves after Olga Economidou, an imprisoned member of the Conspiracy of Fire Nuclei, and Lambros Foundas, a member of Revolutionary Struggle who died in a shoot-out with Greek police in 2010. A document from imprisoned Conspiracy of Fire Nuclei members cites the Italian FAI as an inspiration for their own activity. Consequently, the FAI praised the Conspiracy of Fire Nuclei, stating "Conspiracy's project, like ours, is based on the action and methods of revolutionary violence."

== See also ==
- Alfredo Bonanno
- Anarchism in Indonesia
- Anarchism in Italy
- Animal Liberation Front
- Earth Liberation Front
- Individualist anarchism in Europe
