= María Esther Biscayart de Tello =

Argentine human rights defender (1930–2015)

- Born: 31 August 1930; La Plata, Argentina
- Died: 1 April 2015 (aged 84); La Plata, Argentina
- Occupations: Teacher, human rights defender
- Organization(s): Resistencia Libertaria (1974–1978); Madres de Plaza de Mayo Línea Fundadora (1984–2015)

María Esther Biscayart de Tello (31 August 1930 – 1 April 2015) was an Argentine human rights defender and member of Madres de Plaza de Mayo Línea Fundadora. Originally a teacher by occupation, in the 1950s she joined the anarchist movement and had three children. During the Dirty War, the family was affiliated with Resistencia Libertaria and Biscayart's children were forcibly disappeared by the military dictatorship of the National Reorganization Process. Biscayart then joined the country's human rights movement and advocated for the prosecution of those responsible for crimes against humanity.

== Biography ==
Biscayart was born in La Plata on 31 August 1930. She trained as a teacher in rural schools and as a social worker in the University Extension Department before going back to teach in her home town.

During the 1950s, she was a member of the anarchist group Voluntad together with Pablo Tello, who later became her partner and the father of her three children: Pablo Daniel (b. 25 April 1949), Marcelo Rodolfo (b. 31 August 1950), and Rafael Arnaldo (b. 13 April 1953). The Tello Biscayart brothers worked as carpenters and, after the beginning of the Dirty War, the family joined Resistencia Libertaria (RL).

Marcelo was the first to disappear, being abducted from his home in Córdoba in the early hours of 9 March 1976. Pablo and Daniel were later abducted from their workplace in Tigre on the afternoon of 31 May 1978. They were reportedly seen in "El Banco" and "La Cacha" before disappearing from record. Biscayart's nephew, Eduardo Daniel Pereyra Rossi, was also abducted along with Osvaldo Agustín Cambiaso in Rosario. They were murdered by a group under the command of Luis Patti.

After the abductions, Biscayart herself went into exile in France and began a campaign to denounce the political persecution and crimes of the dictatorship in Argentina. In Paris, she went to the Argentine embassy every Thursday to present her claims. She filed complaints with Amnesty International and the French judiciary and also sought help from film and art personalities.

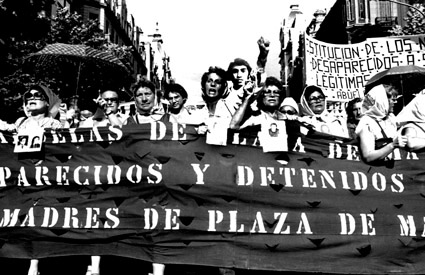
Demonstration by the Mothers of the Plaza de Mayo

On her return to Argentina following the end of the dictatorship in 1984, Biscayart joined the group Madres de Plaza de Mayo Línea Fundadora (English: Mothers of the Plaza de Mayo Founding Line), which initially worked to promote the Trial of the Juntas. She returned to France after the passing of the impunity laws, which prevented the prosecution or conviction of the perpetrators of crimes against humanity.

In 2009, Biscayart re-settled permanently in La Plata, where she testified in a trial regarding the case of the disappearance of her son Marcelo. In December 2014, she participated in the First National Meeting against Impunity and Repression, which was promoted by dozens of organisations from all over the country. Together with a delegation from the Assembly of Mexicans in Argentina, she demanded the appearance of the 43 missing students from Iguala.

She died on 1 April 2015, in her home city of La Plata.
