= Izalco =

- Municipality
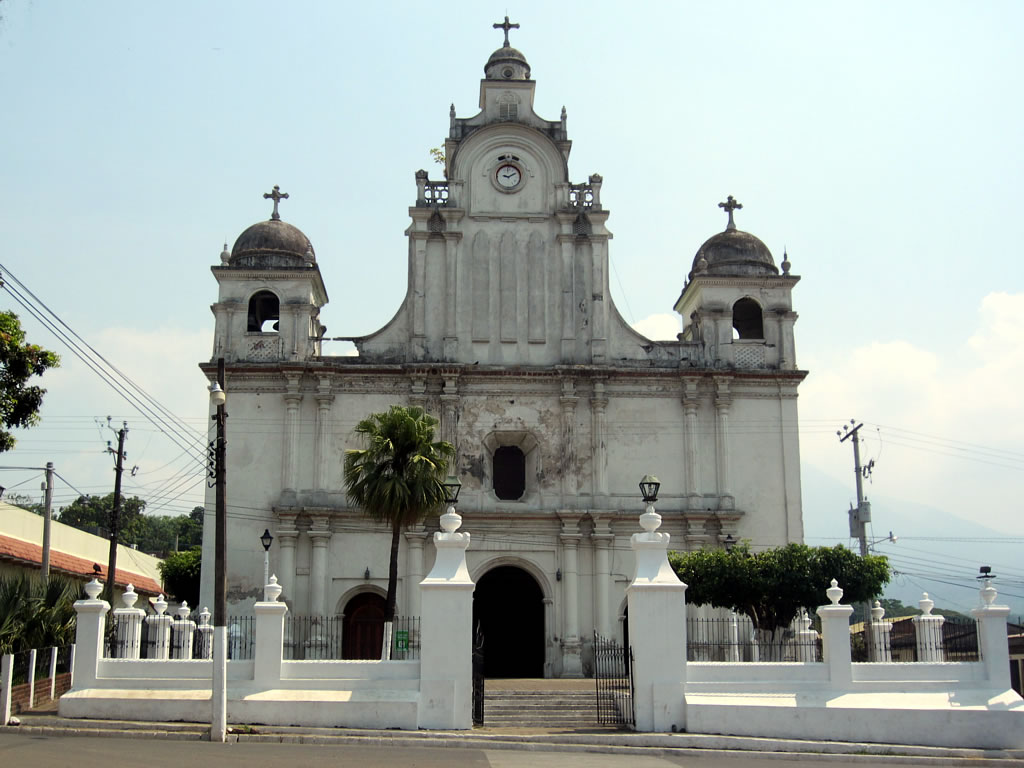

- Location within El Salvador
- Coordinates: 13°44′N 89°40′W
- Country: El Salvador
- Department: Sonsonate

Population (2024 census)
  - Total: 77,529

Izalco (Pipil: Itzalku) is a town and a municipality in the Sonsonate department of El Salvador. Volcan Izalco is an icon of the country of El Salvador, a very young volcano on the flank of Santa Ana volcano. From when it was born in 1770 until 1966, it was in almost continuous eruption and was known as the "lighthouse of the Pacific." Since then it has been nearly inactive.

== Toponymy ==
According to the historian Jorge Lardé y Larin, Izalco comes from the roots itz (obsidian); cali (house), and co (place), which translates to "city of obsidian houses". It is said that the primitive name was tecupan ishatcu, which means "seat of the lords in a place of crystal waters"; or the land was also known as muchishatcu which means "kingdom of the Izalcos".

Another version states that Izalco has other meanings, such as "in the obsidian sands", "in the black sands", and "place of vigilance or penitence"; these all originate from itz (obsidian), shal (sand) co (place), and cali (house).

== History ==
=== Prehispanic Era ===
According to the traditional story from Juan de Torquemada, the last survivor of Tula, Topilzín Acxitl Quetzalcóhuatl II moved to Central America due to the collapse of the Toltec culture in the Anáhuac valley. There, he founded Escuintla, and afterwards Tepcan-Izalco – or tecupan ishatcu – and later, Cuscatlán. However - even though the exact chronology is unknown - scientific investigations established the arrival of the Pipil people in Salvadoran territory in various migrations between the years 900 AD and 1500 AD.

More precisely, the izalcans were one of the four branches of the nahuas who settled in the region, along with the cuzcatlecos, nonualcos, and mazahuas. They were also part of a group of city-states that the Spanish called Tecpán-Izalco, which comprised 15 settlements. The most notable among them were Izalco, Caluco, Nahulingo, and Tacus-calco.

The area was an important producer of cacao (cocoa beans), which was paid as tribute to the presiding authority of the city-states, and also served as money for the acquisition of goods and services such as obsidian and high-quality Guatemalan jade. The central city was named Tecuzalco or Tecuzcalco, which means "head or capital of the Izalcos". It was notable due to its dense population in the area.

=== Peasant uprising in 1932 ===
Izalco was a center of the 1932 Salvadoran peasant uprising. Its native Pipil peasants were led by Feliciano Ama, who was hanged by government troops on 28 January. More than one fourth of the population of Izalco was killed.

== Main sights ==
=== Church Dolores de Izalco ===
It is located in the city of Izalco, in the municipality and district of the same name, near the base of the volcano of the same name, 6.5 Kilometers to the northeast of the city of Sonsonate. It has an elevation of 440 meters over sea level.

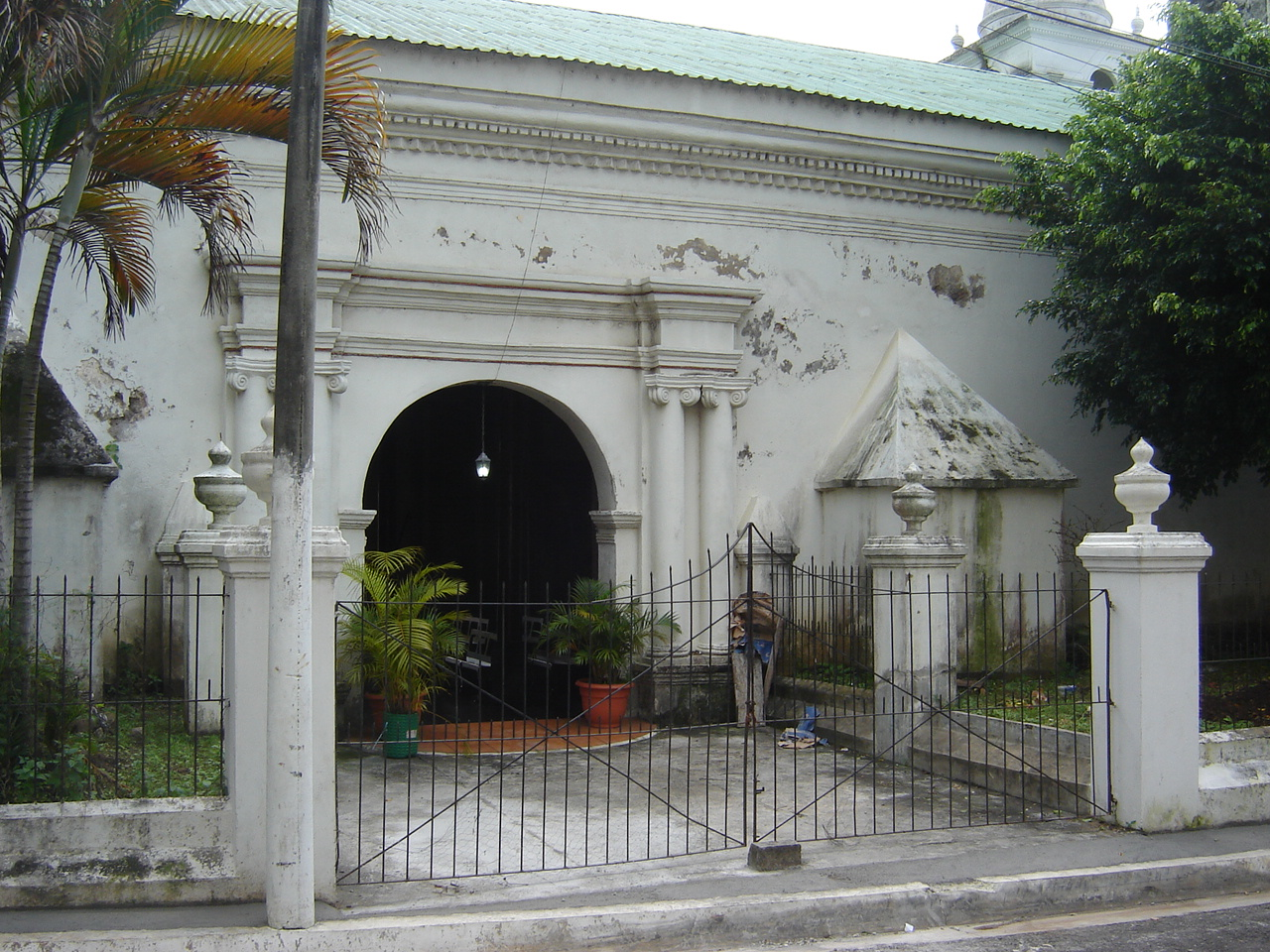
Side Entrance for Iglesia Dolores in Izalco, Sonsonate, El Salvador

It was built prior to 1570, because in this year the parish was very organized according to the civil documents of Caluco. It is unknown who built it but its benefactor was Don Diego de Guzmán.

The church is surrounded by an atrium. The façade is of three bodies, but only two bodies of the church remain: the inferior and the middle one.

The inferior body has many accesses; one main and two lateral. The three accesses have the shape of a semicircular arch. They have four couples of Tuscan columns and entablatures with classic decorations that divide the two bodies at the same time. In the middle body, there is an ocular and other four couples of columns. The molds or entablatures that divide the two bodies have phytomorphic decorations. The superior body or espadaña of recent construction is decorated with pilasters and gothic decorations in relief. The superior part has a clock installed and is crowned by a small dome and a cross.

To each side of the espadaña, there are steeples that have the same decoration style, also crowned by a dome and a cross.

The lateral and later facades are reinforced with support columns. The walls are decorated with entablatures with classic decorations that divide the two bodies at the same time. In the middle body, there is an ocular and other four couples of columns. The molds or entablatures that divide the two bodies have fitomorphic decorations. The superior body or espadaña of recent construction is decorated with pilasters and gothic decorations in relief. In the superior part, there is a clock installed and is crowned by a small dome and a cross.

To each side of the espadaña, there are steeples that have the same decoration style, crowned also by a dome and a cross.

The lateral and later façades are reinforced with support columns. The walls are decorated with entablatures and the lateral accesses are framed with ionic columns. Another lateral access even preserves what is believed to be the original decoration, with Baroque ornaments that look like a flower and leaves. The same decoration can be observed in a superior corner of the later façade.

The interior of the church possesses some original parts, such as the presbytery and the bases of the columns. The rest has been remodeled. The roof is made of tile and wood.

=== Church of Asunción of Izalco ===
The church is in the Baroque style. The façade is of the altarpiece type and it consists of two bodies. The inferior is decorated with two pairs of Tuscan columns on each side of the main access, which was built in a semicircular arch and whose lateral sides look like Tuscan columns.

It has two ornamental ovals in relief, amid the pairs of columns. The superior body is decorated with four pinnacles. It is framed with scrolls and crowned with a cross. A square window is located in the center, which provides illumination to the temple.

In the lateral sides of the church there is an access on each side and several support columns. The lateral walls are decorated with entablatures in the classic style; the roof is made of wood and iron sheets.

According to Monsignor Cortez y Laraz, the parish of Asunción was located in the Barrio de Los Indios, and by the year 1770, it did not have a parish priest. It was also destroyed by Santa Marta earthquake in 1773.

In 1580, the bell given by the Emperor Carlos I of Spain and V of Germany was consecrated.

== People ==
- Maria Teresa Tula, political activist, was born here in 1951.

== Sports ==
The local professional football club is named C.D. Mario Calvo and it currently plays in the Salvadoran Third Division.
