= María Teresa Tula =

Salvadoran activist

- Born: 23 April 1951 (age 74); Izalco, El Salvador

María Teresa Tula (born 23 April 1951) is a Salvadoran political writer and activist associated with the group COMADRES. This group supports those who have been subjected to forced disappearance or political assassination in El Salvador.

== Early life and education ==
Tula was born in the village of Izalco, in the department of Sonsonate, El Salvador on 23 April 1951. At the age of one, her mother left her with her grandmother to move to San Ana with her older brother so that she could find greater opportunities in a bigger city. She was brought up by her grandmother up until the age of 13 when her grandmother died. While living with her grandmother, she attended school for less than two years at the Doctor Mario Calvo Marroquin School in Izalco. Tula and her grandmother eventually moved to San Salvador where she stopped attending school and instead sold bread in the market in San Carlos to help support her family When Tula was a teenager her grandmother suddenly died and she moved in with her mother in Santa Ana. It was here that she had her first child at fifteen whilst she was living with her brothers, sisters and step-siblings. While living with her mother in Santa Ana, she felt very isolated and distanced from the rest of her family, as her step-siblings did not accept her as a sibling, leaving Maria feeling unloved and unwanted in her living environment. Her first child’s father was a boy that she met at her mother's work. However, he had abandoned her, after promising to house her and the child, but he never kept his promise. Leaving her with her mother, stepfather, and step-siblings. Maria had fallen very sick, creating difficulties between her and her mother, where her mother ultimately prohibited her from coming home while recovering from her sickness. Turned away from home, she turned to one of her uncles in Izalco, who worked as a cook on a construction site. Here is where she met her husband, Jose Rafael Canales Guevara.

== Activism ==
=== El Salvador ===
She met José Rafael Canales Guevara who was a blacksmith when she was sixteen. Guevara began organizing against his employers because of the inadequate working conditions. At the time Guevara worked as a blacksmith and workers were not given proper equipment to work. Guevara was eventually arrested for organizing workers against their employers. It was at a jail visit to see her husband where Tula met a fellow COMADRE activist. Tula joined the group called COMADRES which created protests against the government. Comadres had been set up with the support of Archbishop Romero and it was a support group for the relatives of those who were forcibly disappeared or killed. Romero was himself killed in 1980 as was Tula's husband. Tula's husband's body was found with a bullet wound to his head two days after people, who said they were the police, took him away to help with a robbery enquiry. Tula's husband was said to have been a witness to the crime. Friends said that she should not reclaim her husband's body but Tula defied their advice.

1980 marks the beginning of the Salvador Civil War (1980-1992), fought between the Salvadoran government and the Frente Farabundo Martí para la Liberación Nacional (FMLN) guerrilla movement. During this time women played an important role in society by participating alongside men in advocating for a better quality of life. This period allowed for many women to organize and create women organizations that would seek autonomy and define their goals in society. After the death of her husband, Tula worked full-time for COMADRES, who themselves became a target. COMADRES became a target because they actively denounced the Salvadoran military and demanded that the government provide information about disappeared and assassinated family members. Eventually, the organization joined the political sphere by demanding more inclusion of women. Some of her fellow activists were captured and killed, but COMADRES did not shy away from controversy and their workers visited dumps to photograph bodies so that families would know the fate of the "disappeared". Tula was given a specific warning of her own fate by an escaped prisoner of the government.

=== Mexico ===
Tula left for Mexico with her four children in 1982 where she continued her activism in Mexico City. Tula's resolution was strengthened in 1984 when her organisation was given the Robert F. Kennedy Center for Justice and Human Rights Award. This award is given to those who show courage and have made a significant contribution to human rights in their country. Up to 1985 she toured Canada and Europe talking to feminists and others about the cause. She visited at least eight countries and during this journey she realised how the ideas of feminism could be used in her country.

=== Return to El Salvador ===
Tula was tortured and raped after she returned to her home country in 1986. During the time she was captured by armed men, Tula was 7 months pregnant with no access to any nutrition or hydration. Her body is still scared to this day. She had returned to work for COMADRES and she was released after four months due to international pressure which highlighted her mistreatment. Her initial move back to El Salvador had been with hope to be safer after all the international attention and support Co-Madres was receiving, however, her own government once again gave false hope for improvement.

=== United States ===
In 1987, she arrived in the United States where she was again subject to politics. She had a difficult time getting used to a new nation with her identity being extremely public, as well as adapting her children to new surroundings. On top of her controversy, another thing that made it difficult was the language barrier. She applied for political asylum but this took seven years to achieve. The American government was supporting the government in El Salvador and although she had the personal support of dozens of senators she found herself accused of being a terrorist. In 1994 she achieved asylum and Her name had been tainted by her own people despite work being appreciated by the other side.After being denied a visa, she made her journey to the United States via the desert walking towards Arizona and the assistance of a coyote. She was accompanied by her young children throughout. During her time in Arizona, she was supported by individuals families she had helped back in El Salvador. She proceeded to successfully find her remaining family in Los Angeles, CA with nothing but a single phone number and picture. She was met with the surprise of being a grandmother. Tula wrote Hear my testimony which documented her life and her views. For some time, she made her way to Washington, D.C. where she continued to work with the Co-Madres. There, she took part in press-conferences that covered the torturous crimes as well as other social movements organized back in El Salvador. This became a difficult time for Tula's organizing because a lot of the people questioned whether the torture actually took place or it was just a cry for attention. Regardless of the discouraging moments, she continued to actively raise awareness in the U.S. for her country.

The following year she moved to Minneapolis where she found a job in an electronics company.

Since the mid 1990s, she has worked for a twinning organisation, called COCODA, that pairs up communities in El Salvador with partner communities in the United States. Tula's is a member emerita of that organisation.
