= Práxedis G. Guerrero Autonomous Cells of Immediate Revolution =

Mexican urban guerrilla group

- Células Autónomas de Revolución Inmediata Práxedis G. Guerrero
- Logo used by the CARI-PGG
- Leader: Collective leadership
- Dates active: September 8, 2009–2014
- Country: Mexico
- Ideology: Insurrectionary anarchism Individualist anarchism Illegalism; Anti-capitalism; Anti-catholicism; Anti-imperialism; Magonism
- Political position: Far-left
- Status: Defunct
- Part of: Informal Anarchist Federation

The Práxedis G. Guerrero Autonomous Cells of Immediate Revolution (Spanish: Células Autónomas de Revolución Inmediata Práxedis G. Guerrero, CARI-PGG/FAI) was an anarchist urban guerrilla group that centered its attacks in the metropolitan area of the Valley of Mexico, extending some attacks to neighboring states. This group, along with a dozen other cells, came to be considered a serious threat to the stability of the Mexican capital according to publications made by CISEN.

== History ==
The group was named in honor of Práxedis G. Guerrero, the philosopher, poet, editor, journalist and fighter opposed to the Porfiriato, linked to the Flores Magón Brothers and killed during one of the first armed actions of the Mexican Revolution. The European police became more interested in the fight against anarchism (which they equated with terrorism) than against drug trafficking. This was demonstrated by a report on "terrorist tendencies in the EU" explaining the alarm of Europol. According to a report from the National Center for Planning, Analysis and Information to Combat Crime (CENAPI), groups of this ideology emerged from a network of anarchists with a presence in Chile, Spain, France and Italy, and were being investigated by Europol. According to the report, these groups were motivated mainly by the defense of animals and against nanotechnology. However, in the last years of the group, its tactics evolved, having as references the terrorists Mauricio Morales and Theodore Kaczynski. The group was coordinated with groups such as the Individualists Tending to the Wild, the Animal Liberation Front, the Earth Liberation Front, the Mariano Sánchez Añon Insurrectional Cell, and the Brigades of Revolutionary Action for Propaganda of the Deed and the Simon Radowsky Armed Action, with which they organized sabotage and coordinated attacks around the country, especially in the State of Mexico and Mexico City.

=== First Attacks ===
The group's first attack was on September 8, 2009: it claimed responsibility for a homemade explosive in a Bancomer branch in the mayor of Tlalpan, in Mexico City, reporting another explosion on September 10 at an automotive agency belonging to Renault, these attacks being in response to spending on the remodeling of the North Prison and the repression exercised by the government against insurgent cells. The detainees were arrested the following year after a failed attack in which a militant was injured.

On May 3, the group carried out an attack with explosives on a Santander branch in the Narvarte neighborhood of Mexico City, in retaliation for the murder of two indigenous activists in the state of Oaxaca, in addition to claiming a fire against two trucks belonging to the Atayde Hermanos circus. On October 5, 2010, they claimed responsibility for the burning of two patrols in the municipality of Chicoloapan de Juárez, without the authorities commenting on this incident. The group carried out several similar attacks in the State of Mexico.

=== Attacks ===
On May 24, 2011, the group claimed responsibility for an explosive attack against a Starbucks coffee shop in Paseo de la Reforma, and the following day, claimed responsibility for the attack with homemade explosives that occurred early Monday at the Santander bank branch in Benito Juárez and another in Iztacalco. Months later, on September 23 a branch of the Federal Electricity Commission was attacked with explosives that damaged the facade and the lobby of the building. The group claimed responsibility for the attack, exclaiming that "The use of electricity, in addition to constituting one of the main threats to the planet, is a key source of manipulation and social control." In subsequent months, arson or explosive attacks were claimed, but not reported by the press or authorities.

On October 3, they claimed responsibility for two coordinated explosions, an explosion in the Santander bank located in the Toriello Guerra neighborhood of Mexico City, and an explosive device in the home of the PRI politician Manuel Cañedo in Ciudad Nezahualcóyotl.

On November 24, 2011, a package bomb was sent to the Attorney General's Office, specifically the package was addressed to the attorney general Miguel Mancera, but it was sent by mistake to the head of the Attorney General's Office Marisela Morales, the package was intercepted and destroyed by the authorities of Mexico City. The attempted attack was claimed by the Sole-Baleno insurrectionary nucleus belonging to the CARI-PGG. In the same year, the Chilean ambassador to Mexico, Germán Guerrero Pavez, on behalf of a similar anarchist group. Days later, the Célula Anarquista Revolucionaria – Gabriella Segata Antolini, member of CARI-PGG, claimed to have sent an explosive package addressed to Archbishop Norberto Rivera Carrera, which did not detonate and was deactivated by the authorities. On December 12, 2011, the group claimed responsibility for the explosion at the doors of the Italian Institute of Culture in Coyoacán, which left the door and glass damaged.

On March 1, 2012, the group claimed responsibility for sending a package bomb to the Greek embassy in Mexico. On September 22, 2012, the SSPDF Task Force located two small gas tanks tied to the entrance of a bank in Mexico City. No injured or detained persons were reported. In July 2016 the group released a statement confirming the dissolution of the group and giving a "review" on the actions of the group and others.

== See also ==
- Anarchism in Mexico
- Mariano Sánchez Añón Insurrectional Cell (CI-MSA/FAI)
- Popular Revolutionary Army (EPR)
