= Front for the Liberation of the Golan =

Guerrilla organization formed in Syria

- Dates active: July 2006 - Unknown
- Active regions: Syria
- Ideology: Syrian nationalism
- Wars: Syrian civil war; Gaza war

The Front for the Liberation of the Golan (Arabic: جبهة تحرير الجولان) is a guerrilla organization formed in Syria on July 2006 shortly after the 2006 Lebanon War, viewed by Ba'athist Syria as a victory by Hezbollah over Israel. Its aim is to recover the Golan Heights from Israel through a military campaign.

The force is trained by Hezbollah, which in turn was trained by Iran. It is made up of hundreds of Syrian volunteers and Palestinian refugees living in the Damascus area. Although the explicitly stated purpose of the group is to engage in guerilla warfare against the Israeli forces in the Golan heights, the group's activities have been limited to radio broadcasts.

In 2013, Hezbollah formed the “Syrian Resistance for the Liberation of the Golan Heights”. This force fought alongside the Assad-led government of Syria during the civil war.

In October 2023, 700 members of the front where deployed to the Qunaitra countryside, western Rif Dimashq, and western Daraa along the border of the Golan Heights following the start of the Gaza war.
