= Khmer National Unity Front =

- Flag used by the Khmer National Unity Front in its headquarters
- Leaders: Som Ek (AKA Ti To); Sam Serey, KNLF's leader
- Dates active: 2007 – present
- Headquarters: (Cambodia) Phnom Penh and Bangkok
- Active regions: (Cambodia) Phnom Penh (alleged)
- Ideology: Anti-communism; Aristocracy; Conservatism; Monarchism; Khmer ultra-nationalism; Social conservatism; Anti-Vietnamese sentiment
- Political position: Far-right
- Status: Inactive

The Khmer National Unity Front (KNUF), also known as the Tiger Liberation Movement and Tiger Head Movement, is a Cambodia-based domestic terrorist group whose objective is to violently oust Vietnamese influence from within the Cambodian government. The KNUF was founded by Sok Ek and receives its "Tiger" nicknames from its symbol, which features three tiger heads. Like the Cambodian Freedom Fighters, the KNUF is reportedly dependent on foreign aid. The group is blamed for two foiled bomb attacks against the Cambodian government's:

- Cambodia-Vietnam Friendship Monument on 29 July 2007.
- Cambodian Defense Ministry and state-run television station TV3 on 2 January 2009.

== KNUF Membership and arrests ==
The KNUF is based in Cambodia's Mondulkiri Province and is composed of six to nine armed criminals. Four alleged members were recently arrested and are awaiting trial:

- Som Ek (also known as Ti To), KNUF founder and former Khmer People's National Liberation Front member. He is a dual Thai-Cambodian citizen
- Lek Bunnhean
- Phy Savong

Another KNUF member was arrested in mid-2007 and is serving a prison sentence at the Prey Sar Prison.

In 2012 were founded by Serey Sam the Khmer National Liberation Front, and the Cambodian authorities claims that this group is related with the Tiger Liberation Movement. However, KNLF is not related to KNUF according to Serey's claim On 23 October 2014, ten members of KNLF were arrested in Phnom Penh due to peaceful protest in front of Vietnamese embassy. Human rights groups criticized the arrest unjustified and that the detainees were probably not part of any paramilitary group. The UNHCR condemned the use security forces and unofficial security guards to arrest and detain anti government activists, human rights defenders and other kind of activists. 23 October 2016, the KNLF formed a government in exile in Denmark. working peacefully based on international law and Paris Peace Agreement 1991.

The founder of the actual KNLF Sam Serey was arrested on 26 April 2018 in Bangkok because of visa extension, Then Serey was released immediately after the intervention from Human Rights Watch, UNHCR in Thailand and Danish Embassy in Bangkok. On 14 December 2016, his brother Yean Yoeurb w as killed in prison.

== Public disbelief ==
Mondulkiri provincial Governor Lay Sokha and the Royal Cambodian Armed Forces denounce the KNUF and are currently searching out its members. The human rights organization ADHOC, on the other hand, has only heard of the criminals without any "Tiger" references. Cambodian Representative Yim Sovann dismisses the KNUF's existence as "ridiculous" and merely a government scare-factor technique.

Since December 2018 the group has sought to legitimize as a political party, registering with the electoral roll, a move which has been well received by the current government, and give them green light for his registry. With this registry the actual members hope that the current KNUF prisoners have an amnesty process or shorter sentences. But some more radical members see as a process of submission, that the group abandon the "armed campaign", and the government. The government rejected a request by the leader of the KNLF, Sam Serey, to be allowed to form a legitimate political party and return to Cambodia to participate in politics.
