= Mariano Sánchez Añón Insurrectional Cell =

Mexican urban guerrilla group

- Célula Insurreccional Mariano Sánchez Añón
- Leader: Collective leadership
- Dates active: December 2010–2014
- Country: Mexico
- Active regions: Guanajuato, Mexico City, State of Mexico
- Ideology: Individualist anarchism Illegalism; Anti-capitalism; Anti-statism
- Political position: Post-left
- Status: Semi-active
- Size: c. 14 militants
- Part of: Informal Anarchist Federation

The Mariano Sánchez Añón Insurrectional Cell (Spanish: Célula Insurreccional Mariano Sánchez Añón, CI-MSA/FAI) was an urban guerrilla group in the Greater Mexico City area.

== History ==
The group was founded at the beginning of 2010 in a boom of anarchist cells in Mexico City and the State of Mexico. It was active during the arrest of several militants in the demonstrations of the Indignados and Yo Soy 132 movements, as well as the 2012 Mexico riots, where they broke violently into the marches, generally confronting the Grenadiers. After the repression suffered in these protests and the seizure of power by then-president Enrique Peña Nieto, this and other groups began to carry out sabotage and attacks, increasing in intensity and damage caused.

In an interview with members of the group, they claimed to have carried out attacks and sabotage in the early 2000s, but it was not until December 2010 that, together with other anarchist cells, they merged into the Mariano Sánchez Añon Insurrectional Cell. The group was investigated by CISEN, for being a member of the "Coordinadora de las Sombras", responsible for breaking into peaceful demonstrations, carrying out street paints and violent actions on banks and ATMs, as well as placing them in second place on their list of threats against the stability of the country, leaving behind social movements and Marxist guerrillas in the state of Guerrero. This was despite the fact that since 2016 these groups had a significant decrease in their activities, moving to other more lucrative crimes such as drug trafficking or huachicoleo.

== Activities ==
On 9 December 2010, the group claimed the murder of Commander Isaías García Zúñiga, with a firearm shot in the right temple, at the 29th kilometer of the Mexico-Texcoco highway in the municipality of Chicoloapan. The authorities had treated the attack as a suicide, closing any line of investigation. On 5 November 2011, a fire in a securities van was reported in broad daylight, the CI-MSA/FAI claimed responsibility of the attack, although the authorities treated this incident as a short-circuit incident. Days earlier on 13 October, members of the CI-MSA set fire to five armored vans belonging to the private security company "Panamericana".

On 20 October 2012, there was a shooting attack on patrol 282 of the Valle de Chalco Municipal Police, killing its three crew members and leaving one more missing. The Mariano Sánchez Añón Insurrectional Cell claimed responsibility for the death of the municipal police officers but denied that they had kidnapped a fourth officer.

== See also ==
- Anarchism in Mexico
- Práxedis G. Guerrero Autonomous Cells of Immediate Revolution
