= National Liberation Front of Provence =

Militant nationalist separatist group

- Front de Liberacion Nacionala de Provença
- Dates active: c. 2012 to date
- Active regions: Bouches-du-Rhône Mostly Var, France
- Ideology: Provençal nationalism

The National Liberation Front of Provence (French: Front de libération national de la Provence; Occitan: Front de Liberacion Nacionala de Provença; FLNP) is a militant nationalist group that advocates an independent state of Provence and secession from France.

The group became active in 2012. The following year it commenced graffiti and bombing campaigns. The first four bomb attacks occurred in the department of Var; three bombs failed to detonate and were subsequently defused, while one exploded. The group's next attack took place in 2014 in the department of Bouches-du-Rhône. There were no further major incidents until 2017; the group appeared to concentrate on a campaign of racist graffiti in Var. As a result of its clandestine nature, and the group's lack of public pronouncements, media outlets have described the FLNP as a "mysterious" organisation. The French Government has stated that it takes the group's activities seriously.

== History ==
=== Bombing campaign ===
In 2012 the National Liberation Front of Provence announced their presence with a graffiti tag in the department of Var. Violence started the next year. On 21 January 2013, a bomb was discovered outside an estate agency in Garéoult, Var. The estate agency was immediately evacuated and the bomb was soon defused. Leaflets left at the site claimed independence for Provence, and criticised the French Government and real estate speculators who allegedly prevented the Provencal people having access to their own land. Two months later, on 23 March, a homemade bomb exploded outside an estate agency in Sanary-sur-Mer, Var. The explosion caused only material damage, and was accompanied by graffiti tags at the scene proclaiming: "FLNP" and "Provença libra". At the end of the month an unexploded bomb was found at a bank in the centre of Draguignan, in Var. A fourth bomb was discovered at 06:40 on 6 May 2013 in Draguignan, outside a branch of the BNP Paribas bank. A security zone was set up and the bomb was defused at 08:50 by a robot. Leaflets were found at the site, with the stating "Osca FLNP Prouvenço", translated as "Long live Provence". The recently established security zone was removed. Two weeks later an FLNP tag was found in Flayosc, also in Var. According to a police source the tag could be considered a warning. The following year, the FLNP struck in the neighbouring department of Bouches-du-Rhône, with an attack on 22 January. At around 04:00 an improvised explosive device detonated at a tax office in Aix-en-Provence, causing only material damage.

The FLNP's acts were considered significant by the French state and provoked wide media coverage. Because little is known about them; the media refer to the group as "mysterious".

=== Post-violence ===
After a short period of inactivity further FLNP tags appeared; not all these tags were claimed by the group. On 9 December 2014, two suspects, a 35-year-old in Nice and a 43-year-old in Draguignan, were arrested by the anti-terror police on charges related to the tags and for being members of the FLNP. Both men were released after 24 hours.

After a further two years of inactivity, the group left racist tags in central Lorgues, again in Var. The tags stated "FLNP", "CFN", (Note: CFN is an abbreviation of Canal Front National (in English: "National Front Channel"). The FLNP uses Canal Front National as its signature and is recognised by this name.) "FN vote", and the racially obscene "Dehors les barbus nique leurs mères". The local mayor, Claude Alemagna, made a formal complaint regarding them to the police on 20 March 2017. The police claim they do not refer a priority of a popular structured group.
