= COMADRES =

Political organization in El Salvador

COMADRES (CoMadres) is the group of mothers and family members of disappeared, imprisoned political prisoners in El Salvador. They are known for their impactful protests throughout the Salvadoran Civil War which in turn allowed them to receive international attention. They continued to organize and fight against injustices even after the Civil War.

== Political history ==
El Salvador is filled with a long history of social and political unrest. There has been cycles of violence and various conflicts, a significant one being La Matanza in 1932. Indigenous peasants and community activist joined together to rebel against social, political and economic injustices. Under the order of Maximiliano Hernandez Martinez, the Salvadoran military gained more power and raided/killed indigenous villages and people. Major shifts and violence around the country continued during the 1960s and 1970s. The conflict between the left and right wing grew stronger which lead to the Salvadoran Civil War which occurred from 1980 to 1992.

“In a sense, the conflict between left and right wings never ended. Throughout the 1960s and 1970s, left-wing guerrillas and right-wing paramilitary death squads engaged in a deadly spiral of political violence. On October 15, 1979, a group of moderate officers ousted the dictator Carlos Humberto Romero and formed the Revolutionary Government Junta (JRG). In January 1980, right-wing violence broke out against the JRG, including bombings against government newspapers, kidnappings and murder. All of the JRG’s civilian leaders resigned. At the same time, the U.S. State Department received warnings that right-wing death squads were allying with the military against the government”.

Women were involved in the war as guerilla fighters, activists, and post-war reconstruction. They were also heavily involved in NGOs. Some NGOs were women founded and led, such as COMADRES. Las COMADRES did not emerge from a feminist agenda but from the urgent pressures of stare oppression and political instability. As their husbands were killed, family members disappeared, or forced into hiding, many women suddenly became heads of household. In the countryside, women expanded their work for survival:

" In the countryside, women have increased their activities for self-sufficiency ... producing essential goods ... and, at the same time, seeking to increase income ( trying to sell more products, looking for work as domestic laborers " ( Cabrales 4)

Others joined migration movements in search of employment, often leaving their children behind simply to secure food and survive. These circumstances reveal the severe risks and daily struggles that pushed these women to resist political tyranny and ultimately fueled the formation of COMADRES.

These women became powerful advocates for human and gender rights under El Salvador's "hegemonic ideological environment", which the military and right-wing groups sought to suppress political dissent. The COMADRES were viewed as threats because they publicly announced disappearances, actively protested, and supported families of the disappeared. Scholars described a women's identity as politically charged. As mothers became involved in social and political activism, many women began to be perceived by military authorities as "subversive". Military officials framed their participation as a deviation from traditional gender expectations, portraying their motherhood as "tainted" or compromised because they challenged dominant political ideologies and addressed broader social injustices. As a result, they were subjected to violence, sexual harassment, and intimidation, a strategy used by the military in broader counterinsurgency efforts aimed at restricting the COMADRES' participation in social change.

== Comadres background ==
"Comite de Madres y Familiares de Presos, Desaparecidos y Asesinados Politicos de El Salvador" was known as 'CoMadres'. This organization was founded in 1977 and consisted of approximately nine members. This organization played an important role during the civil war. The committee was made up of mothers and family members of people who were imprisoned, disappeared, or killed for political reasons. The goal was to advocate for the rights and social justice of their loved ones while at the same time raising awareness about the human rights violations committed by both sides. The committee consisted of students, teachers, workers, peasants, housewives and small shopkeepers. In the first two years, COMADRES had no formal office and it wasn't until 1979 that they found a definite location where they established a governance structure to maintain and organize themselves. Their organizational structure was built off of 5 different committees: Publicity, Finances, Organizing, Exterior Political relations and a director with 5 representatives that work on daily planning. Their office holds assemblies throughout the week to determine policy decisions and create campaigns for international solidarity and transnational activism. Another accomplishment in 1979 for COMADRES was their first trip abroad to Costa Rica.

Within the Latinnews Archive, two representatives of Comadres mentioned "indiscriminate military bombing campaigns of civilian targets causing an unknown number of deaths".

"Debemos tomar una posición.

Nadie m ́as lo va a hacer.

La mayorparte del tiempo lo que hacemos es llorar

pero esto no ayuda en nada alos que están presos".

Comadres (CoMadres) is the committee of mothers and relatives of prisoners, the disappeared and the politically assassinated of El Salvador.The offices of the committee were subject to police raids by the government. In 1980, their first office was bombed, followed by 4 other bombings throughout the decade. However, each time they re-established thesmelves and continued working. " In 1989, the women's section of the Norweign Social Democratic Party donated money that was used to purchase a permanent office site". This does not only show the international support the COMADRES gained, but also their global recognition of their legitmacy and resilinece that allowed them to rebuild themselves after repeated attacks. Following the year of 1992, there was a signing of the Acuerdos de Paz, which brought hope that human rights violations would finally be addressed and that justice could be found for the disappeared and the murdered. However, the constant pattern of impunity continued. The state failed in its commitments, using COMADRES only as a political tool to gain public support while never fulfilling their campaign promises to help the victims. Impunity for these crimes only deepened, A total of about 48 members were abducted by death squads and subject to torture and rape. Of these, five were assassinated. Rape was strategically employed by state and military institutions as a tool to intimidate and suppress women protestors of COMADRES. Even in midst of the brutal attacks, the women demonstrated strength and courage. They gathered in front of government buildings, demanding justice while holding banners bearing the names of their daughters, young women who had been brutally raped and murdered. In response, authorities and society shifted the blame towards the mothers, claiming they had raised " girls from the streets" [ muchachas de la calle], who were allegedly involved in drug trafficking and prostitution. This narrative was also used as a tactic to stigmatize victims and deflect official responsibility for the disappearances and the broader patterns of state violence.

They also claimed that an average of 30 people were disappearing each week, with most of them being lost trace. It was established in December, 1977, with the help of the Catholic Archdiocese of San Salvador and the Archbishop Óscar Romero, to discover the truth behind the missing relatives of the membership. The COMADRES carried out a wide range of public actions to demand justice: they passed out flyers during Sunday Mass at the National Cathedral and managed to bring their protests onto television, radio stations and newspaper offices. They delivered public announcements, filed reports, and occupied government offices at the United Nations in San Salvador to fax their demands to Washington and Geneva, putting international pressure on the Salvadoran government. They also organized sit-ins at the Ministry of Justice and at churches in different neighborhoods to denounce the tactic of forced disappearances, while running their own radio program to amplify their message. In 1983, Las COMADRES adopted a distinct way of dressing during their marches.

Alicia Panameño de Garcia, one of the members of COMADRES, explained that " black signifies the condolences and affliction we carry for each person killed. And the white headscarf represents the peace we are seeking -- but it must be a peace with justice, not a peace with impunity! We also carry a red and white carnation: the red for the spilled blood, the white for the detained disappeared, and the green leaves, the hope for life". Their outfits served as a form of protection. When dressed in civilian clothes, the army felt free to arrest or mistreat them, but in their recognizable black clothing associated with the women's committee, the army was less willing to capture or harm them because the attire carried authority and visibility. By 1993, there were an estimated 500 or more members. A leader of this organisation was María Teresa Tula.

In 1984, Comadres received the Robert F. Kennedy Center for Justice and Human Rights Award for individuals or groups around the world who show courage and have made a significant contribution to human rights in their country. Aside from the Robert Kennedy Award, COMADRES was awarded five international awards for their humanitarian work.In 1986, Bono of the rock band U2 paid tribute to their cause, and a similar group in Nicaragua, by writing the song "Mothers of the Disappeared", which was released in 1987 on The Joshua Tree. Another accomplishment of COMADRES is the documentary they partook in during International Women's Day on March 8, 1987.

== Individual key leaders ==
COMADRES was formed by women, primarily mothers, ranging from lower, middle, and elite classes. Amongst these women were important leaders such as María Teresa Tula, Alicia Panameño de García, and Sofia Aves Escamillas. Despite all of these different background, they were all married and had children which explains their motherly instincts to help find missing relatives.

María Teresa Tula came from a town called Izalco and was considered a lower class. Before joining, María had no prior political experience, but eventually become involved full time around the mid-1980s. María joined COMADRES in hopes of helping her husband out of jail after his incarceration for leading a sugar mill strike in 1978. After her husbands release from jail, he was not in accordance to her political involvement and led to conflict. She now resides in Minneapolis on the basis of political asylum and became one of the most vocal and prominent leaders of COMADRES. Aside from her political work with COMADRES, she also developed her own testimonio. In this testimonio, María talks about feminism and her own life story.

Sofía Aves Escamillas came from a poor background and from a small area called Guazapa. Coming from a rural area, her job consisted of agricultural work as well as making wallets and suitcases. Sofía joined COMADRES after her son and husband were murdered to due their engagement in peasant and labor organizing.

While María and Sofía come from a lower class, their counterpart Alicia Panemeño de García came from a lower middle class where she worked as a nurse in a hospital. She grew up in a town named Santa Lucía and had previously been involved in a Christisn base community. Alicia joined COMADRES when it first formed in 1977 and eventually became director in 1993. These role of directors was not added until the early 1980s and it consists of day to day planning as well as running the organization.

== Historical and Political Significance ==
=== Gendered Consciousness ===
The COMADRES are widely regarded in the struggles of mothers, wives, and daughters within the political sphere of El Salvador and more broadly in Latin American women's organizing. In a state with an authoritarian government and society that limited women to domestic roles, the COMADRES mobilized to demonstrate against state violence, demanded information for the deceased and disappeared and expanded their human rights advocacy. Publicly, their activism was framed around community, family and confronting human rights abuse in El Salvador, but within the COMADRES organization, their discourse questioned the gender roles for women. But, by framing their activism through human rights regarding deceased and disappeared loved ones, they transformed the identities and roles of women who had never participated in politics or political organizing. Scholars have framed their work as an opening of maternal identity to transform into politically and historically significant figures that are beyond the labels of society. This process of social and political emergence of the gendered identity has been framed as gendered consciousness.

The term “gendered consciousness” arises from the discourse of the constituted experiences of women’s identities as indigenous, mother, activist, etc. and shifted the political meaning of women that dominates society in political and social settings. This feminist theoretical framework is used in feminist scholarship to analyze and understand the historical and political significance of women’s movements and organized by combining sections and categories of transformation of and by women of different social positions.

Motherhood and mothering became political through the COMADRES as they revolutionized new meanings to mothers, wives, daughters, every woman. The COMADRES resistance to state repression collapsed class and ethnic categories that constructed a gendered consciousness amongst Salvadoran women and activists. This emerging consciousness led the members of the COMADRES to conceptualize themselves beyond their reproductive roles and beyond their class, ethnicity, and life experiences, to build in solidarity. As a result, their organizing expanded their efforts of human rights in relation to state violence into a broader scope of women’s rights as well. The mothers and widows of El Salvador established a gendered consciousness that arose from a repressive, sexualized class and ethnic experience.

=== Solidarity Through Class and Ethnic Differences ===
Class and ethnic differences became a central element for the COMADRES and served as a point of unity. As noted by many members of the COMADRES in documents, the groups agreed on their demands

“United with one voice, we want to know where the disappeared are. We want those responsible punished. This is what we are demanding….the CoMadres distribute food to those displaced, compile information on the killed and disappeared, publish their findings in a newsletter, and seek to tell their story to concerned people and organizations all over the world."

Many of the members came from various backgrounds such as housewives, teachers, doctors, store owners, farm laborers, lawyers, etc. Some of the women had to support their families through various low wage jobs such as food labor and domestic work such as upkeeping for wealthy families by washing dishes, ironing clothes, nannying, etc. Many had no choice but to work in such conditions as 65% of El Salvador’s people live in poverty and 73% of children are malnourished and likely to have high early-childhood mortality. Regardless of the vast difference between some of the women, the mothers described a shared understanding of what to do and supported each other through the same struggles. Some members noted the mutual respect between them existed early on when the COMADRES formed and still exists today. Some women weren’t able to read or write, but through the help of their co-members, they learned to debate and acquired knowledge of international laws. They all believed in the same rhetoric and focused their participation equally on their goals.

“The objectives of the CoMadres are simple: freedom for all political prisoners, return of the disappeared, an end to the use of torture, and punishment of those responsible for the violence.”

=== Gendered Aspects: Roles and Violence ===
Gendered aspects throughout the Salvadoran government withheld Salvadoran women to certain roles and limited their participation in society. One CoMadre, América, stated the government believed women were incapable of understanding the political, social, or economic situation, and only viewed them as sexual objects for having children. Through the Salvadoran status quo, Salvadoran women’s femininity was linked to religious theologies such as the Virgin Mary. Women were meant to be obedient, self-sacrificing, putting her children’s needs before hers, and to be fully controlled by this repressive state. Women were meant to be beneath male figures and serve their husbands, fathers, sons, etc. Women who did not conform to these roles were often stigmatized and cast as a symbolic whore. Once the COMADRES had formed, state and military authorities characterized and reclassified women from motherist organizations as tainted, soiled and sexually aggressive. Accounts from this period indicated that women who disobeyed and diverged from the expected kinship and gender roles were subject to kidnapping, torture, sexual assault, and, in some cases, death.

“The practice of raping las madres was common in both El Salvador and Argentina. It was a strategy regularly used in wars to taint the women who were considered deviant and disobedient. They had lost their status as "good" mothers and were viewed as the "subversive whore."....the violations against women's bodies were visibly displayed on their daughters' cadavers as they were found strangled, raped, tortured, and burned. And still the cause behind these blatant killings goes unexplained. Las madres, however, continue to demand justice.”

Testimonies from former political women prisoners documented cases where they were subject to brutal violence as well as their family members. One member noted how her and her daughter were raped with a rifle up their vagina, another member, María Ester Grande was focused to watch her son be tortured by a Salvadoran soldier. A lot of the members were bombed, gang raped, harassed, and forced to speak of secret intel as noted in commission reports.

“In July 1980, a bomb damaged windows and doors of the institution's headquarters...In 1986 the Police in Hacienda arrested and tortured Gloria Alicia Galán...María Teresa Tula, who was seven months pregnant, and took her to an unknown place where she was tortured for three days, being cut with a sharp pointed weapon, beaten and raped by three men who questioned her on her activities in COMADRES...On May 28, 1987, a bomb exploded in the interior of the COMADRES headquarters, wounding Angela López, a member of the organization, and her daughter Margarita López, and severely damaging the furnishings.”

As the organization continued for human rights advocacy, the personal and political experiences of its members shifted its trajectory and focused on incorporating women’s rights as well in their fight for justice. The gendered violence they faced led them to address the issues regarding domestic violence, rape, sexuality, systemic violence, gendered oppression, domestic roles, and collaboration with other human rights and feminist organizations.

=== Solidarity Through Song ===
The most notable artistic reference to the COMADRES has appeared through the lead singer of the rock band U2, Bono, who referenced the COMADRES after meeting some of the members in his time in Central America in 1986. He named the song “Mothers of the Disappeared” after being inspired by learning the tragic events the COMADRES faced and dedicated the song to their story. Additionally, the WATER (Women's Alliance for Theology),, paid tribute to the COMADRES at their vigil ritual gathering on International Women’s Day in 2016. They sang Queremos Paz’s 2001 song Peace is in Our Hands: Peace Liturgies to commemorate the COMADRES and recognize the group's work for human rights history.

“We remember those who are being disappeared today in El Salvador – young women and men who are disappeared, raped, executed, and whose bodies are left on the streets because of the increasing violence by gangs and the resurgence of the death squads. We hear your cries. Cries, we hear your cries, for liberty in this wide world. Paz queremos paz y libertad en este mundo.”
