= Iconoclastic Caravans for Free Will =

Chilean urban guerrilla group

- Caravanas Iconoclastas por el Libre Albedrío
- Dates active: 12 August 2009–2012
- Country: Chile
- Active regions: Santiago Metropolitan Area
- Ideology: Anti-patriotism; Anti-authoritarianism; Anti-catholicism; Anti-religion; Illegalism; Individualist anarchism Insurrectionary anarchism
- Political position: Post-left
- Status: Inactive

The Iconoclastic Caravans for Free Will (Spanish: Caravanas Iconoclastas por el Libre Albedrío, CIPLA) were an anarchist cell active in the Santiago Metropolitan Region, being known for some attacks in the communes of Las Condes and Vitacura. The group gained attention from the authorities for its members being closely investigated during the investigation of the Bombas Case.

== Background ==
Since the mid-2000s, the Santiago Metropolitan Area suffered several attacks with low-intensity explosives, including banks (approximately a third of the bombs detonated in national and international banks), police stations, Carabineros and army barracks, churches, embassies, the headquarters of political parties, company offices, courts and government buildings. Explosives (commonly made from household materials) included fire extinguishers filled with gunpowder or sometimes with explosives such as ANFO, TNT or TATP. They were transported by a group of two to four people late in the morning, leaving the explosive charge, to detonate minutes later, causing material damage.

The only fatality was a young anarchist, Mauricio Morales, who died on 22 May 2009, by a bomb that detonated prematurely, killing him instantly. Since then, several anarchist cells have claimed his death as the date for the beginning of their attacks.

== Attacks ==
The CIPLA's first attack was on 28 June 2009, when militants abandoned an explosive device at the Bricrim Chilean Investigations Police headquarters in Ñuñoa, an attack that only caused material damage. The following day the group claimed responsibility for the attack, which was linked to the allegations of corruption and alleged actions of police officers in the sexual abuse of minors.

On 12 August 2009, two explosives detonated in Santiago, the first at the Sportlife gym in Las Condes, and the other at the Balthus gym on Monseñor Escrivá de Balaguer avenue in Vitacura, both explosions only causing material damage. Days later the Iconoclastic Caravans for Free Will claimed responsibility for the double attack in a statement where it justified its attacks in those areas (those with the highest Human Development Index in Santiago). Due to the magnitude of damage and the area where the events occurred, this has been the group's most publicized attack. On 26 November 2011, the group released its last statement together with several other cells where they showed solidarity with the arrests and dismantling of some cells belonging to the Conspiracy of Cells of Fire in Greece and how this phenomenon could be replicated in Chile.

== See also ==
- Anarchism in Chile
