= Resistencia Libertaria =

Argentine anarchist urban guerrilla group

Libertarian Resistance
- Resistencia Libertaria
- Leader: Collective leadership
- Dates active: 1974–June 1978
- Country: Argentina
- Active regions: Cordoba and La Plata
- Ideology: Anarcho-communism; Insurrectionary anarchism Anarcho-syndicalism
- Political position: Far-left
- Status: Dissolved
- Size: ~100-130

Resistencia Libertaria (initially known as the Resistencia Anticapitalista Libertaria) was an Argentine anarchist urban guerrilla group that emerged in 1974 via a network of workers and university militants from La Plata and Córdoba. The group worked during the last military dictatorship in Argentina and was the only anarchist guerrilla group during the period of state terrorism in the 1970s. At least eight members of the organization were kidnapped and went missing during the dictatorship.

== History ==
During an interview by Chuck W. Morse with Fernando López on 13 October 2002 where he talked about the principles of the group, who joined it, and how the group despite several "insurgent cadres" never had a dissemination organ effective enough like other guerrilla groups, in addition to other armed actions and the influence that this group had on the next generations of anarchists. Between 31 May and 8 June 1978, the Argentine government kidnapped a score of RL militants, the most important being Rafael Tello, Pablo Tello, Elsa Martínez, Hernán Ramírez Achinelli, "Melena" Edison Oscar Cantero Freire and "el Pata" Fernando Díaz Cárdenas.

Fernando López Trujillo (former R.L. militant) gave an interview during a talk in Paraná on 22 March 2004, published in "Documents for debate Nº3", Libertarian Socialist Organization, where he spoke about the background of anarcho-syndicalism in Argentina and the theoretical support for the group. He also spoke about how some militants perceived Peronism and its impact on the social movements of the time (either from the right or left perspective), as well as the leftist militancy, reaching 1978, the final year of the organization, which had suffered several blows and disappearances of members before the 1978 FIFA World Cup in Argentina.

== See also ==
- Anarchism in Argentina
- María Esther Biscayart de Tello, mother of Rafael and Pablo Tello

== Bibliography ==
- Diz, Verónica; Trujillo, Fernando López (2007). Resistencia libertaria (in Spanish). editorial Madreselva. ISBN 978-987-23777-0-0.
- "Resistencia libertaria: el anarquismo armado en los 70". Revista Sudestada. 63. Buenos Aires. 2007.
