= Revolutionary Cells (Argentina) =

- Células Revolucionarias
- Dates active: June 1, 2009 – March 2011
- Country: Argentina
- Active regions: Buenos Aires
- Ideology: Insurrectionary anarchism Anarcho-communism; Focism; Libertarian socialism Individualist anarchism Illegalism; Anti-statism; Anti-imperialism; Anti-capitalism
- Political position: Far-left
- Status: Defunct

The Revolutionary Cells (Spanish: Células Revolucionarias) were an urban guerrilla group created in mid-2009 in the metropolitan area of Buenos Aires, being responsible for several arson attacks and explosive attacks against government buildings, transnational offices and "bourgeois structures".

== History ==
In mid-2009, the Luciano Arruga Brigade joined forces with the Juan Bianchi Nuclei, Joaquín Penina Nucleus, Hilda Guerrero de Molina and Simón Radowitzky Nucleus, and together expropriated weapons belonging to employees of private security companies in the towns of General Pacheco and Quilmes, in Greater Buenos Aires, claimed in various anti-authoritarian media sources. The other cells that belonged to the group included the Diego Petrissans Nucleus, Leandro Morel Nucleus, Juan Bianchi Nucleus, 22 August Class Collective, Bonefoi-Carrasco Unit, Cárdenas-Fuentealba Unit, and Heroes of the Tragic Week Unit.

The group released a statement highlighting some questions and doubts that generated large-scale actions, both in the capital and in the interior of the country, recalling Marxist-Leninist guerrillas during their ideological and practical apogee. In addition to the fact that in their communiqués they threw together a "classism", "proletarian heroism" and an endless number of ideological mixtures, according to other anarchist militants, they later clarified that they were a group that refused to be "vanguard, classist or enlightened", and was receptive to militants of different ideologies. The group also released a statement where it talked about the Río Negro attack, in which it justified this and other attacks where third parties were injured, adding that it was not the intention of the group and was supposedly one of the central axes of the self-criticism carried out by the group.

=== Attacks ===
The first attack carried out by the group was on 1 June 2009 when they claimed an explosive attack against a Chevrolet dealership in Buenos Aires, causing material damage, but it was not reported by the press. Their second attack was on 4 August at 02:30 am. In Buenos Aires, an improvised explosive device exploded in the offices of LAN Airlines, damaging a door, window and some furniture, but without causing casualties. A man was detained for questioning but was not identified as being involved in the attack. The Mauricio Morales Brigade of the Revolutionary Cells claimed responsibility for the attack.

In the early morning of 16 November 2009, in Buenos Aires, an explosion in front of a City Bank branch near a luxury hotel. Days later the anarchist-communist "Célula Revolucionaria Marco Ariel Antonioletti" claimed responsibility for the attack. On 17 December, a cell claimed responsibility for an attack on the retirement center of the federal police in Buenos Aires, but it was not recognized by the press. Days later the group also claimed an explosion in the vicinity of the headquarters of the Federal Penitentiary Regime, in Buenos Aires, an explosive attack against a BBVA Francés branch on 29 December 2009, and an attack with Molotov cocktails against a metropolitan police barracks in Buenos Aires.

It was not until 17 March 2010, that the Mauricio Morales Brigade claimed responsibility for an explosive attack against Banco Nación in Villa Urquiza, smashing windows and ATMs, without any suspect arrested. On 25 May 2010, an improvised explosive was detonated, disabling 3 ATMs and causing damage to the facade of Banco Ciudad, in the Buenos Aires metropolitan area, without registering any detainees.

On 4 July, the "Andrea Salsedo Brigade" detonated an improvised explosive against a BBVA Francés branch, causing slight material damage. Days later, on 13 July, there two explosive attacks against the headquarters of the Río Negro Police School in the city of Cipolletti, leaving a municipal employee dead, in addition to an attack on the local Telefónica headquarters in repudiation for the murders of Mapuche militants in Furiloche. On the same day in the city of Cutral Co, the Cárdenas-Fuentealba Combat Nucleus attacked the home of a member of the Ministry of Social Development, accused of acts of corruption. Also on 23 July, the 20th police station in the city of Neuquén was attacked with bullets. The attack took place at the stroke of midnight, the police officers on duty heard the impact and went out, seeing a group of people fleeing about 100 meters away. The police station received seven hits on one of the external walls, although none of them managed to pierce the concrete wall or injure anyone, and the police failed to arrest anyone. Days later, the Luciano Arruga Brigade and the Cardenas-FuenteAlba Nucleus claimed responsibility.

In the following months, the group continued to claim attacks that were not confirmed by the authorities. On 23 November 2010 they were responsible for a shooting attack against an armored truck in Escobar, which left two dead and two more injured. The attackers fled the scene, at least 8 criminals acted in 4 cars, but they could not take the money and in the first instance there were no detainees, the attack being mediated. The next day members of the Núcleo Joaquin Penina stole 60 thousand pesos from a valuables truck in the city of Granadero Baigorria in the Province of Santa Fe, leaving a dead guard and another with minor injuries, this being the last attack carried out by the group.

=== Arrests and dismantling ===
On 14 February 2011, one of the members Diego "El Sucio" Guardo died at the age of 34. He had been identified in a stolen car in the city of Los Polvorines, the suspect was carrying two small weapons and was hit by the shots fired by the Buenos Aires Police. On 2 March, two police officers were captured and accused of being the perpetrators of the attack, and it was found that they were companions of the victims. After the arrests, it was discovered that it was a mixed gang composed of civilians and agents of the security forces: policemen, a firefighter and a former officer of the Prefecture. In addition, some of those arrested were investigated for being suspects of the kidnapping and murder of Axel Blumberg in 2004.

Months later, on 9 April 2011, the 56-year-old César "el Chivo" Guardo was arrested, as he was believed to be the leader of the group who planned the attack against the armored truck. The suspect was arrested after a shootout between him and another suspect against members of the security forces, leaving an officer and "El Chivo" injured.

On 14 April 2016, the fourteen detainees for the assault on the Pan-American tank were acquitted, this because there is no concrete evidence for the homicides of Buenos Aires police officers Darío Fabián García and Rubén Fangio. The presiding judges who gave the ruling unanimously were Guillermo Guehenneuf, Gladys Cardozo and Ángeles Andreini.

== See also ==
- Anarchism in Argentina
- Severino Di Giovanni
