= Wallmapu =

Historical territory of the Mapuche people

Wallmapu Mapuche Territory
- Wenufoye

- Map showing an interpretation of the historical presence of Mapuches between the 16th and 21st centuries based on data from Melin et al. (2015).
- Status: Former country
- Common languages: Mapudungun, Spanish
- Demonym: Mapuche
- Today part of: Chile, Argentina

mapu "land"
- People: Mapuche
- Language: Mapudungun
- Country: Wallmapu

Wallmapu is the word in the Mapuche language to say "Universe" or "set of surrounding lands", currently used by some historians to describe the historical territory inhabited by the Mapuche people of southern South America. The term was coined in the early 1990s by Indigenist groups but gained traction in the 2000s as the Mapuche conflict in Araucanía intensified. Some view the Wallmapu as being composed of two main parts Ngulumapu in the west and Puelmapu in the east, with the southern part of Ngulumapu being known as Futahuillimapu.

On May 19, 2022 a conference on the topic "The threat of Wallmapu" (Spanish: La amenaza de Wallmapu) was held in the city of Neuquén, Argentina.

== Etymology ==
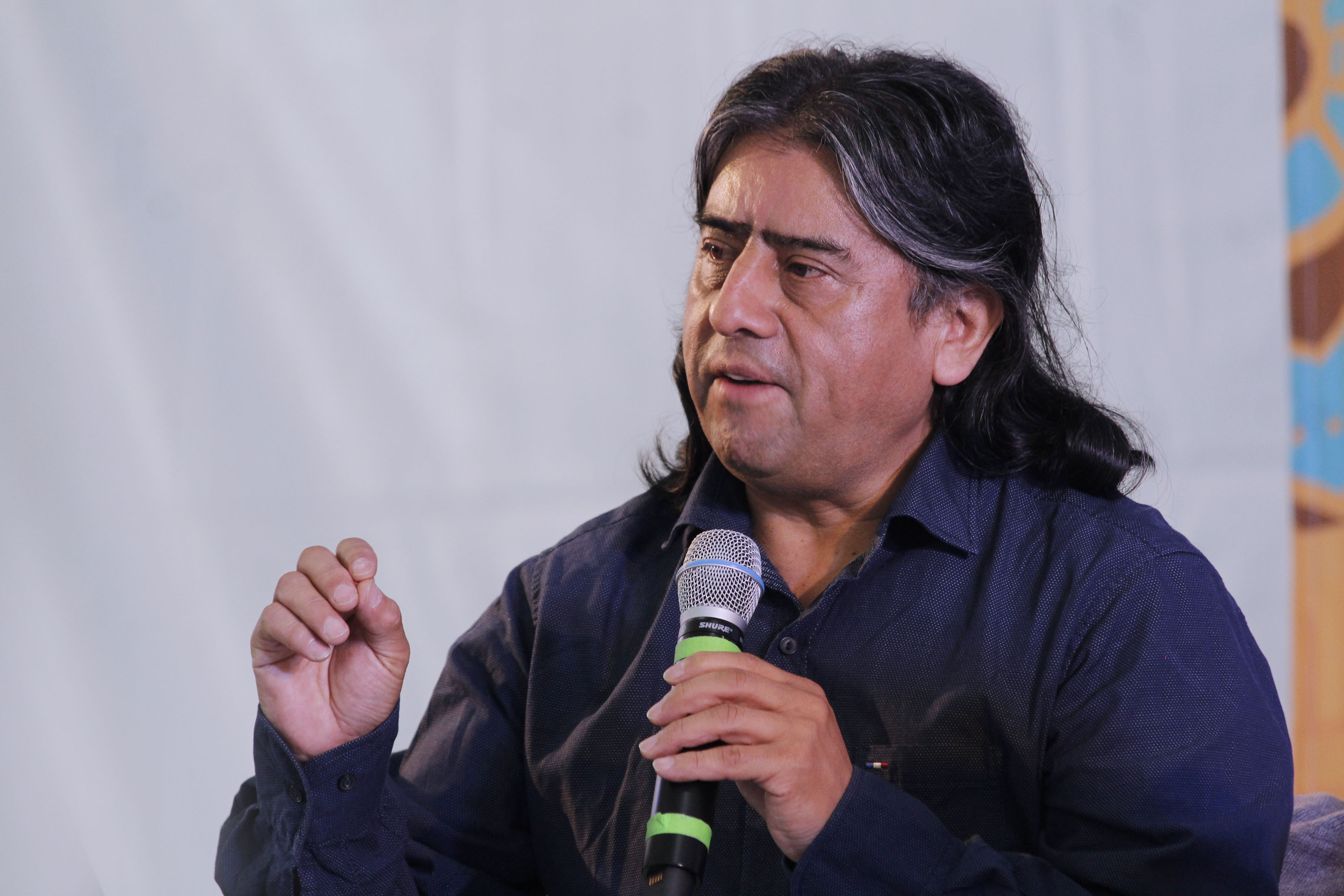
Aucán Huilcamán, renowned Mapuche Indigenist political activist.

Wall means "around," "surrounding," or "encompassing" in Mapudungun, while Mapu means "land" or "territory." Therefore, Wallmapu translates to "land of around" or "surrounding territory." The concept of wall as encompassing, spherical, or the edges of mapu is reconfigured in relation to the winka (non-Mapuche). This notion, expressed in discourse, involves measures that challenge and transform epistemic systems, altering territorial conceptions.

The term began to gain widespread use outside Mapudungun-speaking communities after the Council of All Lands adopted its Mapudungun name, Aukiñ Wallmapu Ngulam, upon the organization’s founding in 1990. It arose in response to what indigenist movements describe as "repression" and the perceived disregard of land deeds (Títulos de Merced). This was accompanied by a wave of Mapuche migration from the south-central region to major Chilean cities during the Chilean military dictatorship and before. The Council was notable for engaging in historical revisionism and adopting political stances opposing the Chilean state's interests in the region, particularly regarding demands for "ancestral land recovery" and "political territorial autonomy for the Mapuche people." This movement also included the creation of the Wenufoye national Mapuche flag in 1992, along with five additional flags representing key Mapuche territories in southern Chile. Since 2005, the term has also been promoted by the Mapuche nationalist party Wallmapuwen.

The Chilean historian Cristóbal García Huidobro states that: "the terminology ‘Wallmapu’ is not a relatively old one, but rather a newer one. It arises, as far as it has been understood, from a revisionist movement, at the beginning of the 1990s (...) they make a re-study and a revisionism of the identity, of the language, as well as of the symbols that would represent the Mapuche people (...) it is not a historical question as such, it does not come from the ancestral culture of the Mapuche people who never perceived their territory as a particularly defined place".

The Council reinforced the concept of self-determination through a long ideological process led by various intellectuals. In parallel, in late 1989, several groups began land occupations in Lumaco and other areas. In the 1990s, autonomist ideas also permeated some regional prisons.

As Chile transitioned to democracy in urban areas, a political project aimed at the "reconstruction of Wallmapu" emerged in indigenous southern territories. This initiative was ignored by Chilean political elites.

The construction of the Ralco Hydroelectric Plant, which displaced indigenous burial sites, was a breaking point in state-Mapuche relations, contributing to the formation of the Coordinadora Arauco-Malleco (CAM) in 1997 following the burning of three trucks belonging to Forestal Arauco. This event marked the beginning of the Araucanía conflict and a turning point in the development of the Mapuche autonomist political movement.

The CAM, which defines itself as anti-capitalist and "in resistance against neoliberalism," uses violence to reclaim lands it considers usurped during the Occupation of Araucanía and now held by large landowners and extractive industries. These areas serve as the foundation for territorial control, which the CAM views as essential for self-determination and the holistic development of Indigenist activists. CAM leaders, such as Héctor Llaitul, represent a newer, more separatist generation compared to figures like Aucán Huilcamán, founder of the Council of All Lands.

Currently, a conflict persists between the states of Chile and Argentina and various Indigenist groups. The central demands include territorial autonomy and restitution of lands claimed as ancestral under the Títulos de Merced, granted to some communities after the Occupation of Araucanía and Conquest of the Desert.

== See also ==
- Araucanization
- Incas in Central Chile
- Patagonia
