= Coordinadora Arauco-Malleco =

Indigenist organization

Coordinadora Arauco Malleco
- Emblem used by the Organos de Resistencia Territorial (military arm) in sabotage actions awarded by the CAM. The image represents a guemil (symbol of Mapuche iconography) with a Mapuche clava inside it.
- Leader: Héctor Llaitul
- Dates active: 1997–present
- Active regions: La Araucania Region and Bio Bio Region
- Ideology: Anti-capitalism; Anti-imperialism; Indigenism; Ethnic nationalism
- Wars: the Mapuche conflict

Coordinadora Arauco-Malleco (CAM) is a radical, militant indigenist organization engaged in political violence in pursuit of attaining an autonomous Mapuche state in the territory they describe as "Wallmapu".

Founded in 1998 in Tranaquepe, Chile, CAM arose from the revitalization of the Mapuche conflict that decade, motivated by the extreme poverty and discrimination their ethnic group had to undergo for over a century, ever since the Occupation of Araucanía. CAM considers their own actions to be but fair self-defence amidst a struggle of national liberation, and their politics combine Mapuche traditions, Western political thought and knowledge acquired through experience.

CAM is responsible for several land occupations in the zones of Tirúa, Contulmo, Cañete and Temucuicui, and is known for resorting to arson against logging trucks and rural estates operating or located within the territories they claim as their own. Although occasionally such attacks have affected civilians, they aim to damage the property of those who "have usurped their homeland". Most of their actions are carried out on the sly, but sometimes they have resulted in confrontations with the "Fuerzas Especiales" of Carabineros de Chile. CAM has also backed minor Mapuche communities in taking direct action against forest companies and landowners who exploit the region, by lending them paramilitary support – a way of exerting political pressure.

On May 31, 2022, the Chamber of Deputies of Chile, with 66 votes in favor, 43 against and 13 abstentions, approved a resolution requesting the Chilean government to declare the CAM as an "illegal terrorist organization", as well Resistencia Mapuche Malleco, Resistencia Mapuche Lafkenche, and Weichán Auka Mapu.

== History ==
Ngüñelfe with blue background, one of the traditional flags

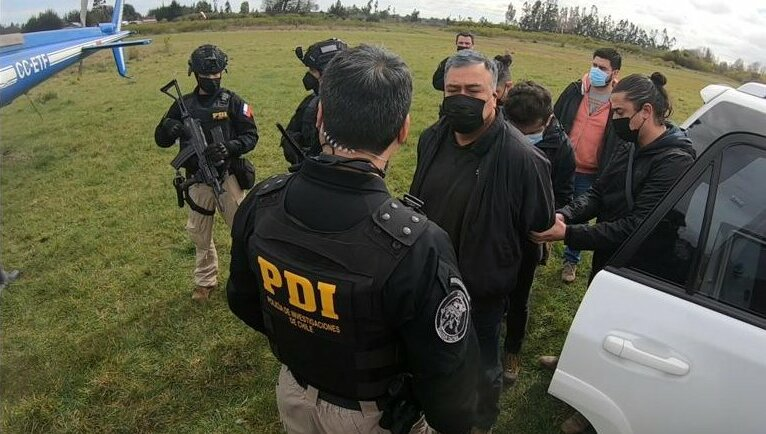
Llaitul (with mask) during his detention in 2022

=== Background ===
The Mapuche conflict continued in the 1990s following the return of democracy. The conflict started in areas inhabited mostly by Mapuches like the vicinities of Purén, where the indigenous communities have been demanded that their ancestral lands, which were now the property of logging corporations, farming companies, and individuals, be turned over to them. At this time, forestry companies owned three times more ancestral Mapuche land than the actual Mapuche people.

In 1993, the Chilean government passed the Indigenous Peoples Act which recognized Mapuche participation, land, cultural, and development rights. Additionally, the law created the National Indigenous Development Corporation (CONADI), an indigenous governing body founded to help support the development of indigenous peoples in Chile. While the law gave substantial promise of reconciliation and justice to the Mapuche people, in reality, the act continues to be extremely underwhelming and disappointing to most Mapuche people in contemporary society.

=== Recent history ===
The construction of the Ralco Hydroelectric Plant, which displaced indigenous burial sites, was a breaking point in state-Mapuche relations, contributing to the formation of the Coordinadora Arauco-Malleco (CAM) in 1997 following the burning of three trucks belonging to Forestal Arauco. This event marked the beginning of the violence in the Southern Macrozone of Chile (also known as Araucanía conflict) and a turning point in the development of the Mapuche autonomist political movement. Since then, violence has progressively increased and expanded to the neighboring regions of Biobío and Los Lagos.

In 1996, some Mapuche communities formed the Lafkenche Territorial Coordinator. In 1998, the conflict of Traiguén arose followed by the later realization of a meeting of communities and a Guillatún. In this meeting the communities in conflict of Arauco and Lumaco participated, the Mapuche Coordinator of Santiago and the Mapuche Organization Meli Wixan Mapu of Santiago. Leaders from communities of Collipulli also joined. During this meeting, the idea of a new meeting in Tranaquepe was raised, only with the Mapuche communities in conflict. In a moment of the meeting, the idea of forming the Coordinadora that they named "Mapuche Coordinator of Communities in Conflict Arauco Malleco" arose.

The first attack perpetrated by the group was the 1st of December 1997, when in the area of Lumaco, three trucks belonging to the company Forestal Arauco were intercepted by community members who would later be known as members of the CAM. This action created a new subjectivity in the Mapuche militancy, modifying its way of doing politics, detonating in a conflict against the security forces.

According to historian Jorge Pinto Rodríguez, the organization is the entity that up to 2017 has led the most violent mobilization of Mapuche people: "It has claimed the figure of the warrior or weichafe -in Mapudungun-," he said. Beyond a specific event, Pinto indicated that the beginnings of this organization are associated with a "lack of response from the State in response to the demands made to mitigate the effects of forestry, mining and hydroelectric projects in La Araucanía or Wallmapu ("ancestral territory" in mapudungún), he explained. "They are opposed to a state that they call colonialist and capitalist, and emerge from a stage, at the end of the nineties, of indigenous protests throughout the continent, they take the flag in Chile," said Pinto.

== Attacks ==
=== 2009 actions and controversy ===
On the morning of August 12 of 2009, it is alleged by Chilean officials that about 80 Mapuches entered the country estate "San Sebastián", located between Collipulli and Angol, and occupied it. The occupation was made in response to their unanswered request to buy the San Sebastián estate by authorities. Sergio González Jarpa, agriculture businessman and owner of the estate, requested to the court of Angol the ouster of the occupants. Carabineros gathered special forces from Araucanía Region and flew in a GOPE unit from Santiago. The ouster begun at around 14.00. As result one young Mapuche Jaime Mendoza Collio was shot dead and one carabinero was injured in the leg. The leader of Mapuche organization Consejo de Todas las Tierras Aucán Huilcamán strongly condemned the actions of the police and called the killing an extrajudicial execution. Later on the Legal Medical Service of Chile stated that the dead Mapuche had been shot from behind in the back. Investigations by Policía de Investigaciones have shown that the Mapuche who was shot, Jaime Mendoza Collío, did not have remains of gunpowder on his hands as Carabineros had suggested.

The attacks of 2009 again brought the CAM issue to the level of government. The Alianza por Chile claimed that the Concertación governments have not done enough to arrest the authors of the attacks and protect private property. On August 19, Chilean President Michelle Bachelet condemned an incident between minister Edmundo Pérez Yoma (DC) and the opposition deputy Gonzalo Arenas (UDI), where Arenas threw an alleged copy of the pardon of former CAM leader Víctor Ancalaf on Pérez Yoma's face. Victor Ancalaf had served 5 years of a 10-year prison sentence for terrorist crimes, which Ancalaf vehemently denies.

=== Murder of Werner Luchsinger and Vivianne Mackay ===
The gravest case to which CAM has been linked to is the murder of Werner Luchsinger and Vivianne Mackay, a couple of wealthy farmers who died in an arson fire in their country house located in Vilcún, in 2013. After being found by the police that night – bullet-wounded and less than a mile away from the Luchsinger's farm – machi Celestino Córdova was held responsible for the attack and later judged and condemned for the crimes. He is still serving the sentence and is the only person to have ever been formally charged for the deaths of the Luchsinger and Mackey. CAM claims that he is innocent and was used as a scapegoat, and as such considers himself to be a political prisoner.

In September 2017, the prosecutor of La Araucanía, Roberto Garrido, confirmed that there was a connection between members of the Weichán Auka Mapu and the Luchsinger-Mackay case. This was due to ongoing investigations showing the involvement of at least 25 individuals in the attack. The prosecutor confirmed that the investigations were still ongoing.

== International contacts ==
Latest evidence, such as their leaders being invited into Caracas and Colombian authorities investigations, has established links between the organization, the government of president Nicolás Maduro in Venezuela, and the FARC guerrillas.

== See also ==
- Mapuche conflict
- Weichán Auka Mapu
- Resistencia Ancestral Mapuche
- Wallmapuwen
- Council of All Lands
- Association for Peace and Reconciliation in Araucanía
- KLFA
