= Natividad Llanquileo =

Mapuche lawyer, activist and former member of the Chilean Constitutional Convention

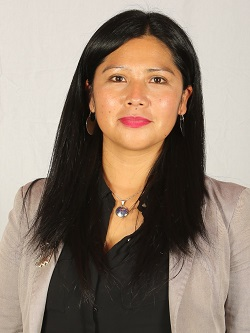
- Natividad Llanquilleo in 2011

Member of the Constitutional Convention of Chile
- In office 4 July 2021 – 4 July 2022
- Preceded by: office established
- Succeeded by: office abolished

Personal details
- Born: Natividad Llanquileo Pilquimán; July 14, 1984 (age 42) Tirúa, Chile
- Education: Bolivarian University of Chile; University of La Frontera
- Occupation: Lawyer

Natividad Llanquileo Pilquimán (born July 14, 1984) is a Mapuche lawyer and human rights activist. Llanquileo was noted for her role as a spokesperson during the 2010 Mapuche hunger strike. She was a member of the Constitutional Convention during its existence from 2021 to 2022.

== Biography ==
Llanquileo was born on 14 July 1984 in the Esteban Yevilao community of Puerto Choque, located in the commune of Tirúa in the Biobío Region. Llanquileo studied law at the Bolivarian University of Chile and later received a degree in Human Rights, Public Policy and Interculturality from University of La Frontera.

As an attorney, she has defended imprisoned Mapuche activists. With regards to the Mapuche conflict, she has stated that "police and foresters are the main obstacles to solving the conflict that exists in Wallmapu." Two of Llanquileo's brothers participated in the Mapuche prisoner hunger strike of 2010, and Llanquileo rose to prominence as the public spokesperson for the demonstrators.

In 2011, Llanquileo condemned the sentencing of human rights attorney Karina Riquelme Viveros to 21 days in jail for allegedly providing legal advice to Mapuche activists prior to receiving a law degree. Llanquileo described the sentencing as an act of political repression, stating that the "only reasonable explanation for such an unusual [sentence]" was that Riquelme "had become a problem for prosecutors and police" through defending Mapuche activists.

In 2018, Llanquileo was elected president of the Center for Research and Defense of the South (CIDSUR, Spanish: Centro de Investigación y Defensa del Sur). The organization, which is headquartered in the city of Temuco, is dedicated to protecting the human rights of indigenous Chileans. Llanquileo has stated she has been subject to state repression during her time working at CIDSUR on behalf of Mapuche clients.

== Constitutional Convention ==
In 2021, Llanquileo launched her candidacy to serve on the Constitutional Convention of Chile to represent the Mapuche people, who have seven reserved seats on the body. She received 5.94% of the vote and was elected to the body, making her the second most-voted Mapuche candidate after Francisca Linconao, who received 7.15%. Longtime Mayor of Tirúa Adolfo Millabur was also elected to represent the Mapuche in their district.

Llanquileo ran for the presidency of the Constitutional Convention with the support of left-wing alliance The List of the People. In the final round of voting, Llanquileo cast a blank vote instead of supporting fellow Mapuche activist Elisa Loncón, who won the contest. This was considered a surprise given that Llanquileo had previously indicated her support for Loncón, and was the only Mapuche member of the Constitutional Convention to oppose her candidacy.

Llanquileo explained her vote against Loncón by saying she was "tired of doing politics" behind "closed doors" and insinuated that Loncón is too closely affiliated with the Concertación. Llanquileo stated:

"As indigenous peoples, as Mapuche people, the Concertación parties raided us, repressed us, militarized us, imprisoned us, stole our territories and did not legislate in our favor. So, we cannot expect them to behave in a different way now."

== Political views ==
Llanquileo favors the establishment of a plurinational state in Chile. She has criticized extractivism, stating that Chile must shift its development model away from dependence on resource extraction to one that respects natural resources. She has referred to the country's 1980 Constitution as a "constitution made by a group of white men in dictatorship, in which the people had no participation".

On the subject of party politics, Llanquileo has criticized parties and politicians affiliated with the centre-left, arguing that the Concertación alliance has failed to advocate for indigenous communities. In a 2018 interview, Llanquileo stated that the approaches towards Mapuche communities undertaken by Michelle Bachelet (Socialist) and Sebastián Piñera (conservative independent) were roughly as antagonistic. However, she noted that Piñera's "much sharper" rhetoric has contributed to an environment in which police violence against Mapuche activists has flourished.
