= Héctor Llaitul =

Chilean Mapuche Indigenist political leader and activist

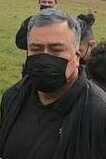
- Héctor Llaitul being detained
- Born: Héctor Javier Llaitul Carrillanca; 19 November 1967 (age 58); Osorno, Chile
- Other names: "Comandante Héctor" "El Negro"
- Education: University of Concepción
- Occupation: Political activist
- Movement: Coordinadora Arauco-Malleco; Manuel Rodríguez Patriotic Front; Revolutionary Left Movement
- Criminal charges: Incitement to violence Use of firearms contemplated in the State Security Law; Violent encroachment Theft of timber Attempt against authority
- Criminal penalty: Effective imprisonment and payment of 26 UTM for various offenses
- Criminal status: In prison
- Partner: Pamela Pezoa Matus
- Children: 4
- Parents: Juan José Llaitul Álvarez (father); Florinda Carrillanca Treimun (mother)

Héctor Javier Llaitul Carrillanca (born in Osorno, Los Lagos Region, November 19, 1967) is a Chilean of Mapuche-Huilliche origin, known as the leader of the armed organization Coordinadora Arauco-Malleco (CAM) participant in the Mapuche conflict, where he is referred to as "Comandante Héctor" or "El Negro." He has been charged with crimes such as incitement to violence, use of firearms, violent occupation, theft of timber, and attacks against authorities.

Llaitul has been accused of planning and executing arson attacks in the Biobío and Araucanía regions. He was prosecuted and formally charged by the Nueva Imperial prosecutor's office based on the testimony of Roberto Painemil, which was allegedly obtained under torture, and was acquitted of all charges in June 2008. He was under arrest from February 21, 2007.

In March 2010, the Criminal Court of Cañete sentenced him to 25 years in prison for robbery with intimidation and attempted homicide of a prosecutor. Later, the Supreme Court partially accepted a nullity appeal filed by his defense, reducing his sentence to 14 years. As of August 2022, he has been in prison for charges of timber theft and violations of the State Security Law, linked to his alleged involvement in arson attacks.

On May 31, 2022, the Chamber of Deputies of Chile declared the Coordinadora Arauco-Malleco, and other three armed organizations as "illegal terrorist organizations".

On May 7, 2024, the justice system sentenced him to 23 years in prison for violent occupation, theft, and attacks against authorities, along with a fine of 26 UTM for the various crimes for which he was convicted.

== Biography ==
=== Family and education ===
He is the son of Juan José Llaitul Álvarez and Florinda Carrillanca Treimun. He married Pamela Pezoa Matus, with whom he has four children.

He pursued a degree in social work at the University of Concepción, where he joined the Revolutionary Left Movement (MIR) as a member. During the military dictatorship of Augusto Pinochet, he became a member of the Manuel Rodríguez Patriotic Front (FPMR), an armed organization that served as the military wing of the Communist Party of Chile.

=== Founder and Leader of CAM ===
Logo of the Coordinadora Arauco-Malleco

The construction of the Ralco Hydroelectric Plant, which displaced indigenous burial sites, was a breaking point in state-Mapuche relations, contributing to the formation of the Coordinadora Arauco-Malleco (CAM) in 1997 following the burning of three trucks belonging to Forestal Arauco. This event marked the beginning of the contemporary Mapuche conflict and a turning point in the development of the Mapuche autonomist political movement. Since then, violence has progressively increased and expanded to the neighboring regions of Biobío and Los Lagos.

In February 1998, along with other Mapuche communities, political groups Llaitul officially co-founded the Coordinadora Arauco-Malleco (CAM) in Tranaquepe. The organization also included José Huenchunao, Alihuen Antileo, Adolfo Millabur (former mayor of Tirúa, who later publicly distanced himself from CAM), and Víctor Ancalaf. Within CAM's leadership, Llaitul was supported by Ramón Llanquileo (arrested in January 2007 and sentenced to five years for an arson attack in Ercilla) and José Huenchunao (captured on March 21, 2007).

In May 2022, the Chamber of Deputies of Chile declared the Coordinadora Arauco-Malleco, Resistencia Mapuche Malleco, Resistencia Mapuche Lafkenche, and Weichán Auka Mapu as "illegal terrorist organizations".

== Detention and Trial ==
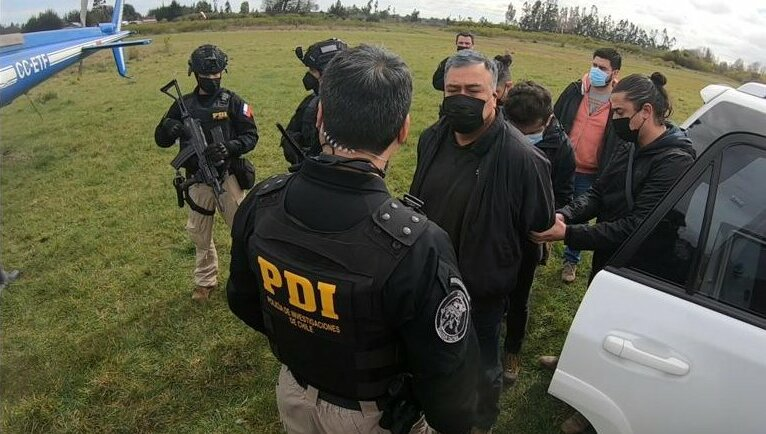
Llaitul (with mask) during his detention in 2022.

On August 24, 2022, he was arrested in Cañete by members of the Investigations Police of Chile on charges of timber theft and violations of the State Security Law, following a complaint filed by the second government of Sebastián Piñera in 2020.

In April 2024, he was accused of smuggling weapons from Cuba and Argentina into Chile based on audio recordings under review by legislative authorities. That same month, he was found guilty of all charges, including incitement to violence and firearms use under the State Security Law, as well as violent occupation, timber theft, and attacks on authorities.

On May 7, 2024, he was sentenced to 23 years in prison and fined 26 UTM. Following his sentencing, Llaitul called for the recovery of the CAM, criticizing the Gabriel Boric administration and the Communist Party of Chile for allegedly serving "oligarchic and corporate interests" in conflict zones.

The following month, Llaitul began a hunger strike, demanding the annulment of his trial and a review of appeals filed by his defense.

== See also ==
- Mapuche conflict
- Aucán Huilcamán
- Council of All Lands
