= Association for Peace and Reconciliation in Araucanía =

Asociación para la Paz y la Reconciliación en La Araucanía
- Formation: January 2019; 6 years ago
- Founded at: Temuco
- Type: Political organization
- Purpose: Anti-mapuche autonomism and separatism Anti-indigenism
- Region served: Chile
- Official language: Spanish
- President: Francisco Alanís Porcella
- Vice President: Justo Gutiérrez

The Association for Peace and Reconciliation in Araucanía (In Spanish: Asociación para la Paz y la Reconciliación en La Araucanía; APRA for short) is a civic movement in the Araucanía Region that condemns arson attacks associated with the regional conflict and advocates for the defense of farmers and forestry workers affected by attacks directly related to the Mapuche conflict. The organization has been described by media as far-right for its anti-indigenist rhetoric. The organization is also critical of Mapuche community members in the area, whom it has described as "violentists", and according to its vice president, the organization "documents on social media the attacks by Mapuches against the rest of the Araucanians"

== History ==
The organization first appeared in January 2019, in response to land occupations, arson attacks on truckers from extractive companies, and murders that occurred in the region. Among these, the most notable are the attack on the couple Werner Luchsinger and Vivianne Mackay in 2013, the death of Juan Barrios in February 2020, and the homicide of Carabinero Eugenio Nain in October of the same year.

== Activities ==
Within the context of the incidents in the Araucanía in 2020, on July 27 of that year, Mapuche community members held demonstrations in various communes of the Araucanía region in support of the hunger strike led by machi Celestino Córdova. The gathering in Curacautín, a city in the region, ended with the municipality being occupied by Mapuche indigenist protesters, and it was evicted on August 1, 2020 after a clash between local residents and supporters of Córdova's petition. Various Chilean media outlets report that APRA played a crucial role in the eviction, calling on residents to attend the municipality to end the violence. During these evictions, civil protesters made "racist" chants against the Mapuche people, which, combined with destruction amid what appeared to be a passive stance from the Carabineros, caused national repercussions.

APRA's activities include the dissemination of information such as news, meetings, propaganda, and political disputes over violence in the area, as well as the civil organization of farmers and victims of rural violence. Many of the news they have shared have been proven to be false. They were even ordered by the Court of Appeals of Temuco to remove content from their social media, as it was considered denigratory.

== Impact ==
Its followers have allegedly committed assaults against Manuela Royo, a lawyer who has sponsored various legal actions against the organization.

Gloria Naveillán, the spokesperson for the group, supported the candidate José Antonio Kast during the 2021 Chilean presidential election. This same person is mentioned in the 2015 report "Organized farmer groups and potential confrontation with indigenous community members" by Carabineros de Chile. It has been labeled as an extreme right organization by various online newspapers.

== See also ==
- Mapuche conflict
- Council of All Lands
- Coordinadora Arauco-Malleco
- Araucanía (historic region)
