= Juana Calfunao Paillaléf =

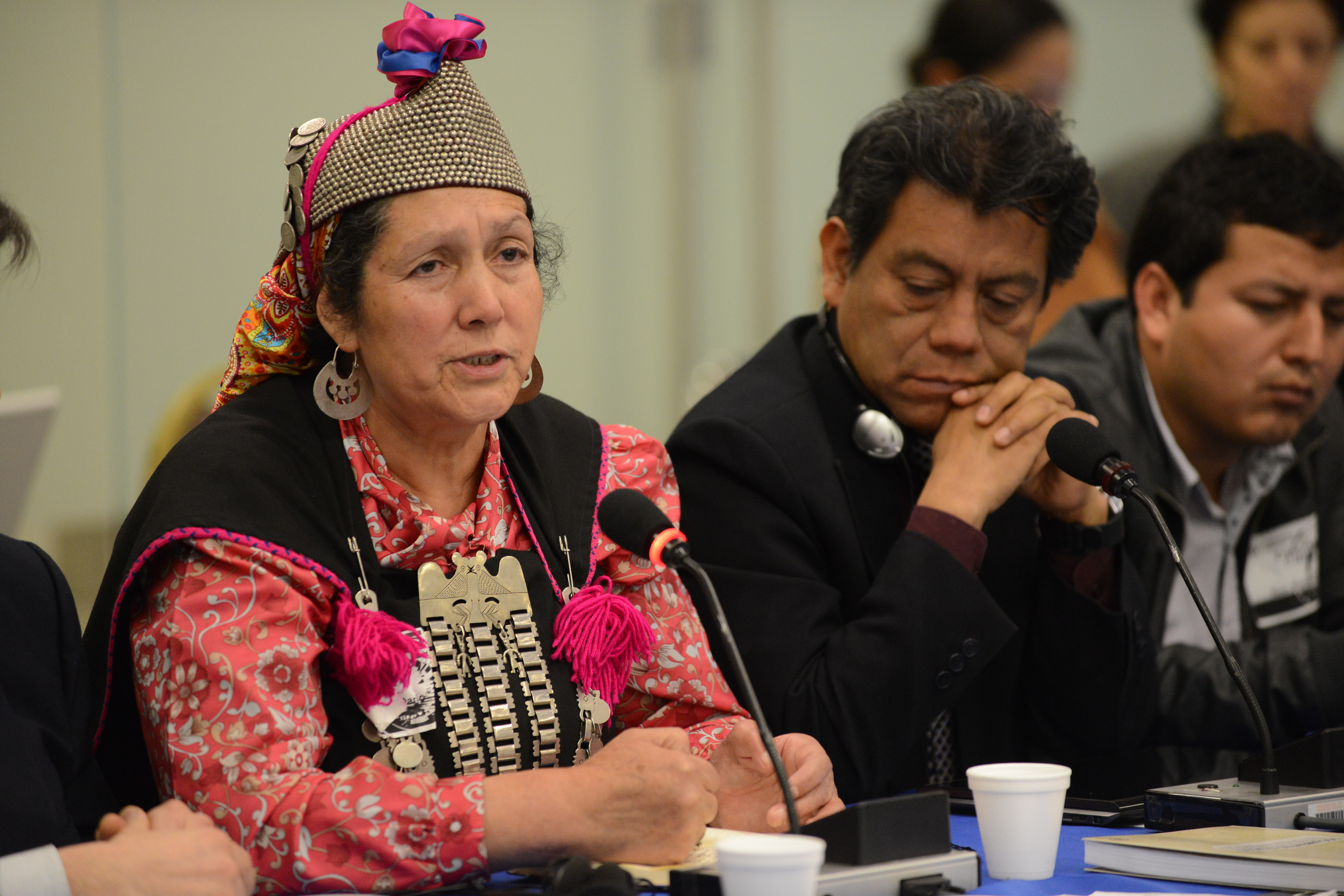
Lonko Juana Calfunao Paillaléf

Juana Calfunao Paillaléf (also known as Juana Calfungo or Juana Calfunao) is one of the main authorities or chiefs (Lonko) of the Mapuche indigenous community of south-central Chile. She is the chief of the Juan Paillalef community, of Cunco, Araucanía Region.

Calfunao Paillaléf is a significant leader in the struggles of the Mapuche peoples to assert their sovereignty, resist state and corporate violence, and condemn the extraction of natural resources from their ancestral lands.

She is the daughter of werkén Ambrosio Calfunao, who died when she and her brothers and sisters were children, and lonko Mercedes Paillaléf. Her mother was also a community leader, imprisoned by the Chilean military dictatorship for two years in the Temuco prison.

She is a founder of the Chilean non-governmental organisation Comisión Ética Contra la Tortura (Ethical Commission Against Torture). In November 2006, she was sentenced to 150 days of imprisonment by the Chilean state, for protesting the illegal construction of a private road through Mapuche land. She ended up spending four and a half years in jail. Other members of her family have also been persecuted or imprisoned. Her daughter Relmutray was sent to Switzerland at the age of 9, where she applied for asylum and lived with her aunt, Rayen Calfunao Paillalef, between 2006 and 2011.

In October 2015, Calfunao Paillaléf visited the United States and testified before the Organization of American States (OAS), suing the Chilean government for various forms of violence committed against the Mapuche people, including the appropriation of indigenous lands and the mistreatment of Mapuche women and children.
