= Karina Riquelme =

Chilean lawyer (born 1981)

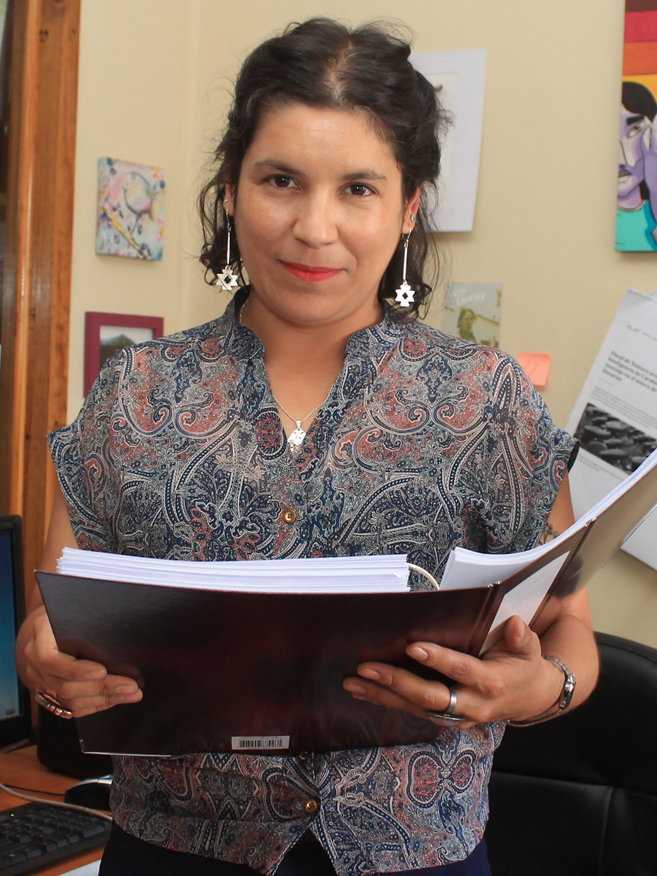

Personal details
- Born: Karina Riquelme Viveros; August 9, 1981 (age 45) Temuco, Chile
- Children: 1

Karina Riquelme Viveros (born 9 August 1981) is a Chilean human rights lawyer. Riquelme is affiliated with the Center for Research and Defense of the South (CIDSUR, Spanish: Centro De Investigación Y Defensa Del Sur), an organization committed to defending the rights of indigenous Chileans. Groups such as Amnesty International have stated that Riquelme has been subject to persecution and intimidation campaigns for her role defending indigenous activists.

== Biography ==
At CIDSUR, Riquelme has worked to defend Mapuche leaders charged with terrorism and protect the ancestral territories of the Mapuche people. Riquelme has argued that the Chilean state has worked to criminalize indigenous activism during the Mapuche conflict through systemic persecution of activists like Francisca Linconao.

In 2011, Riquelme was sentenced to 21 days in prison with conditional remission over allegations she had provided legal defense to Mapuche activists without having attained a law degree. Her sentence was condemned as an act of political persecution by Mapuche activist Natividad Llanquileo, who would later become president of CIDSUR.

Riquelme's work has been honored by Amnesty International for her work defending indigenous activists against state repression. Riquelme has described herself as a feminist and stated that anti-colonialism must be a hallmark of feminist politics.

== Intimidation campaign ==
On 10 July 2018, an incident occurred in Riquelme's apartment in Temuco, Araucanía Region, in which two men pointed green laser beams through the window in what is believed to have been an effort to intimidate her. Amnesty International condemned this incident which is believed to have been committed by "police intelligence agents". Riquelme has stated that she has been the subject of police surveillance efforts since 2010.

== Personal life ==
Riquelme lives with her daughter, who was present during the 2018 incident in which police officers pointed laser beams through her window, in Temuco, Araucanía Region.
