= Resistencia Ancestral Mapuche =

Mapuche separatist organization

- Leader: Facundo Jones Huala
- Dates active: 2009–present
- Active regions: Chubut Province, Neuquén Province and Río Negro Province
- Ideology: Mapuche nationalism; Anti-capitalism; Anti-imperialism; Indigenismo; Anti-Catholicism; Anti-Argentine; Anti-Chilean
- Wars: the Mapuche conflict

Resistencia Ancestral Mapuche (transl. "Mapuche Ancestral Resistance", RAM) is an indigenous organization advocated to the creation of an autonomous Mapuche state in Araucanía, which is, they say, the revindication and recovery of former Mapuche lands. They are mostly renowned for their violent methods, often recurring to arson, poaching and armed attacks against Argentine National Gendarmerie. It operates in the Patagonia region of Argentina and Chile, seeking to claim back territories of both countries to create an independent Wallmapuche country for the Mapuche nation. It is associated with the Coordinadora Arauco-Malleco, considered a terrorist organization by the Chilean government.

== Attacks ==
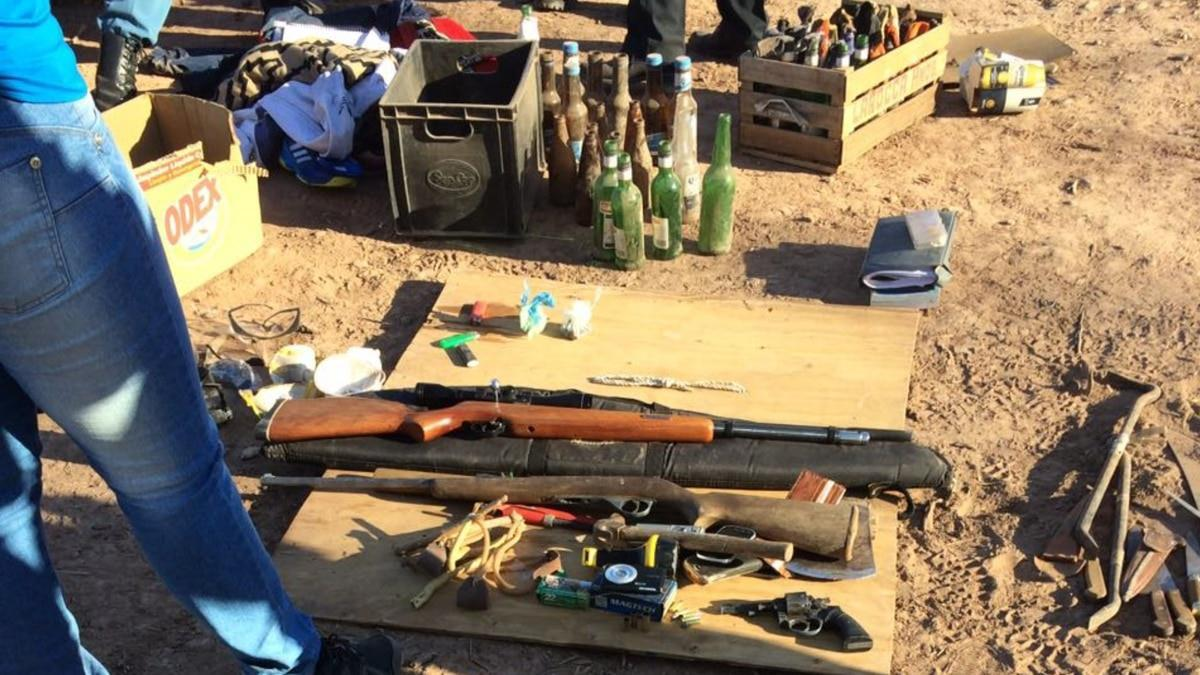
Weapons seized from the RAM, after an attack to the Kumenia concessionaire.

In 2012, policeman José Aigo was killed when he tried to check a truck heading to Aluminé. Two Chilean organizations belonging to RAM, "Frente Patriótico Manuel Rodríguez" and the "Ejército Guerrillero de los Pobres", took credit for the killing of the officer. However, years before, different media attributed their murder to poachers, which led to the arrest of the son of the mayor of San Martín de los Andes who would be one of the hunters who shot the policeman.

One of the first attacks of 2017 was committed at the National Route 40, burning a truck. The driver, Luis Rastrelini, commented that he was surprised by an improvised rock roadblock, and then was attacked by hooded men. They filled the truck with oil, and then made it explode with a molotov cocktail. Another attack took place in Bariloche. They burned two buildings, and left banners asking for the freedom of their leader, Facundo Jones Huala. Those banners featured their logo, composed by a mapuche shield and a rifle. They also attacked the estancias of the Italian clothing company Benetton Group at the Chubut Province. The watchman Evaristo Jones reported that they attacked and tortured him, stole his weapons and burned his shed, claiming that it was not an action against him but against the owners of the estancia. The organization has been accused of committing similar attacks against other employees and their families, burned forests and farming grounds, vandalized the farming vehicles and the electric service, and the vehicles in the nearby roads.

== Disappearance of Santiago Maldonado ==
On August 1, 2017 people of the Lof Cushamen community protested for the freedom of the imprisoned RAM member Facundo Jones Huala, blocking a road near El Maitén, and were dispersed by the Argentine National Gendarmerie. Santiago Maldonado, a protester who supported the claims of the people blocking the road, was reported missing after that. Witnesses testified before judicial authorities that Maldonado was taken by Gendarmerie agents, and with the disappearance of Maldonado the RAM became known at national level in Argentina. On August 4, a group of hooded vandals attacked the "Casa del Chubut" building in Buenos Aires, leaving vandalizing graffitis from the RAM. The United Nations Committee on Enforced Disappearances has urged the Argentine government to search and locate Maldonado. The prosecution is investigating the disappearance of Maldonado as a case of forced disappearance. When the Argentine National Gendarmerie (GNA) did enter the area, a corpse was found in the river. An autopsy confirmed it belonged to Maldonado, that the body had no signs of blows or injuries, and that he died by asphyxia and hypothermia. The judicial case was closed a year later, as the judge ruled that there was no forced disappearance and that there was no further evidence pointing towards anything other than an accidental drowning. The judge's ruling was backed by the reports of more than 50 independent forensic experts.

== Death of Rafael Nahuel ==
On 25 November 2017 the federal forces carried out an eviction. In this context, the Albatross group of the Prefecture repressed rubber bullets and lead bullets to the members of the Lafken Winkul Mapu community. Rafael Nahuel, aged 22, died in the shooting. The autopsy confirmed that he died with a 9mm bullet, as those used by the Albatross group, ruling out a friendly fire.

Although the Minister of Security affirmed in a few hours that the death of the young man had taken place in the framework of a "confrontation", and that the Mapuche possessed weapons of war, no weapon was found. Experts confirmed that Nahuel had no traces of gunpowder in his hands, which discards the hypothesis of "confrontation" – and that the members of Prefectura had carried out at least 114 shots.

== Ideology ==
The RAM released their manifesto on November 11, 2014. Their goal is to establish a Mapuche nation, and they do not consider themselves Argentines or Chileans. They declared themselves enemies of capitalism and the state, and reject bureaucracy and the Argentine and Chilean laws. They also reject the Catholic Church, as the religion of a "winka" god. They call themselves "Weichafes", a term in Mapuche language that means "warrior". They consider the RAM prisoners to be political prisoners, and that they are victims of state terrorism. Aiming for self-determination, they consider that the armed insurrection would be a legitimate action. They welcome the help of non-Mapuche people, as long as they follow their leadership.

Facundo Jones Guala is the visible face and member of the RAM. He is currently held prisoner in Esquel, Chubut Province. He was interviewed by the TV program Periodismo para todos, and said: "There are things that I can not conceal, like my political and ideological doctrine. We support the use of political violence as a weapon of self-defense. We plan the Mapuche liberation as the reconstruction of our world. We are the armed wing of the Mapuche movement: we use molotovs, knives, sticks. More than that, we can't afford".

== Reactions ==
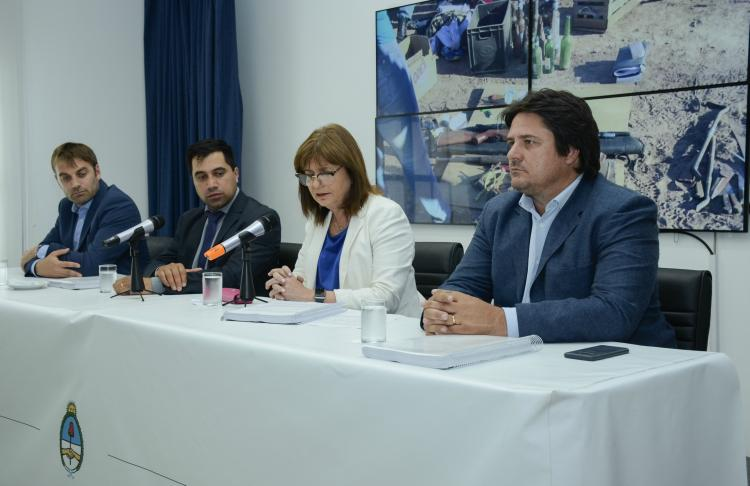
Minister Patricia Bullrich presents a report about the RAM.

Some minor political figures, such as the bishop of Bariloche Juan José Chaparro, doubted the actual existence of the RAM, and suggested that it was instead a deception crafted by the national government, with the purpose of justifying police repression with an alleged national enemy. Minister of National Security Patricia Bullrich denied it, and said that it was instead the RAM whose chose to be enemies of the state. Working alongside the governors of Chubut, Neuquén and Río Negro, Mariano Arcioni, Omar Gutiérrez and Alberto Weretilneck, the Ministry of National Security wrote a report about the RAM, detailing all the information available about the group, including their attacks and the judicial cases started about them. She also announced that the national government and the three mentioned provinces would work together against the RAM.

Facundo Jones Huala is currently held prisoner in Argentina, and is on trial on terrorism charges. Chile asked for his extradition, to judge him for similar charges, but Argentina has refused to do so. The Argentine police has tried to drive them away from the estancias of the Benetton family, but were unsuccessful so far. The mapuche lonkos Camilo Nahuelquir and Raducindo Calfupan rejected the actions of the RAM, and pointed that their actions are not endorsed by the Mapuche populations.

On February 5, 2025, the Argentine government led by Javier Milei declared the RAM a "terrorist organization" after the Governor of Chubut, Ignacio Torres, linked the RAM to the ongoing wildfires in the region—which have already affected more than 20,000 hectares—and accused Jones Huala of instigating them. However, the Mapuche leader denied any involvement of the RAM in the forest fires that have spread across Argentine Patagonia since December, stating: "We have never done it, nor would we ever do it" in response to the accusations.
