= Shooting of Eugenio Nain =

Chilean policeman (1996–2020)

Eugenio Nain
- Eugenio Nain in 2016.
- Born: Eugenio Sebastián Nain Caniumil; April 13, 1996; Temuco, Chile
- Died: October 30, 2020 (aged 24); Temuco, Chile
- Cause of death: Gunshot wound
- Occupation: Police officer
- Years active: 2016-2020
- Spouse: Daihanna Sabrina Pereira Soto
- Children: 2

Eugenio Sebastián Nain Caniumil (13 April 1996 – 30 October 2020) was a Chilean policeman and secondary corporal who was shot to death by an unidentified armed group in the Padre Las Casas commune. His death occurred during the social context of the Araucanía Conflict and the Chilean social outburst.

== Biography ==
Nain was born in the Chilean city of Temuco, capital of the Araucanía Region, on April 13, 1996, to Christian Roberto Nain Norambuena and Johanna Jacqueline Caniumil Hueichaleo, and was of Mapuche descent. He joined the Carabineros police force on January 16, 2016. His half-brother, Iván Antonio Vidal Caniumil, is also a police officer. At the time of his death, he was married to Daihanna Sabrina Pereira Soto and had two children, who were six years and seven months old.

=== Death ===
On the morning of Friday, October 30, 2020, Nain went along with other members of the Carabineros to Ruta 5 Sur, near the Cantera de Metrenco sector in Temuco, where the highway had been blocked due to a protest with barricades. Nain had no knowledge of public law enforcement, and had come to the scene in an unarmored vehicle. As seen in an almost minute-long video recorded from a moving truck, a loud shot was heard a few moments after Nain got out of the vehicle. Following the shooting, Nain was transferred to the Regional Hospital of Temuco, where he died.

== Reactions ==
Mario Rozas, then-General Director of the Carabineros, said he felt "anger and impotence" over the murder of Nain. He commented:

2nd Corporal Eugenio Nain Caniumil has been cowardly assassinated and this act will NOT go unpunished. I ask my compatriots, I ask YOU, to help us find these miserable people, these wretches and place them at the disposal of Justice.

— Mario Rozas, via Twitter

On the part of the government, the act was condemned, and President Sebastián Piñera made a call to "depose, exile and end the violence." Víctor Pérez Varela, then-Minister of the Interior, declared that the murder was "a painful event for Chile and La Araucanía," and visited the area the same day.

Benjamín Olave Huichaleo, Nain's uncle and fellow policeman, harshly criticized the conditions in which they worked in the field, and Temuco Hospital he called for General Rozas to "put on his pants".

The Mapuche community of Lof Rofue wrote in a statement:

As Lof, we do not have a further record of the events that occurred in the death of this policeman. However, we regret the death of a Mapuche, who in defense of the interests of the rich, offers his life. Likewise, we also deeply regret the murders of our pu peñi and pu lamien at the hands of the Chilean and Argentine state, along with the fact that they have not received justice.

== Tributes and legacy ==
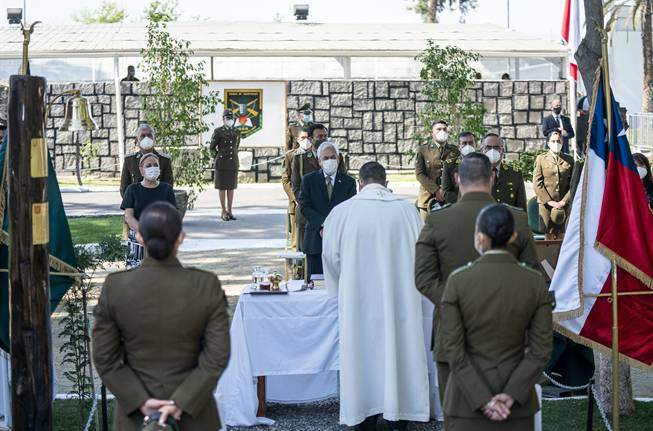
Ceremony in honor of Eugenio Nain held on November 1, 2020.

On January 13, 2021, he was posthumously promoted to noncommissioned officer in a ceremony at the Temuco Police Training School, which was attended by the General Director of the Carabineros Ricardo Yáñez, and the Minister of the Interior Rodrigo Delgado. Yáñez stated:

This is very important for the Institution. This recognition expresses the feelings and soul of each one of the Carabineros in the face of a very painful situation, such as the murder of one of our own.

Daihanna Pereira, Nain's widow, who present at the ceremony with her children and family, also said:

I feel that he earned it and deserves it... he loved his Institution very much, he gave everything for his work, for his uniform... this is for him, to his honor, to always remember him and never forget

Minister Delgado added:

[Eugenio Nain] is another martyr of the Carabineros, murdered in a rather cowardly way. I think it is very important to give him recognition, in the acknowledgment of those who have fallen during their work duty, especially in the case of the Carabineros, when they take an oath to give their lives for others.

Nain's aunt claimed that:

We have been left abandoned. They did not kill him for being a policeman, they killed him for being a Mapuche, is what I can say.

== See also ==
- Shooting of Camilo Catrillanca
- Mapuche conflict
