= Alihuen Antileo =

Chilean constituent

Alihuén Antileo
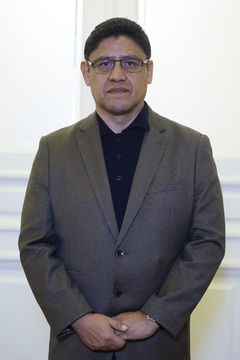

Member of the Constitutional Council
- In office 7 June 2023 – 7 November 2023
- Constituency: Reserved seat

Personal details
- Born: 9 July 1964 (age 62) Temuco, Chile
- Education: University La Republica (LL.B)
- Profession: Lawyer

Alihuen Antileo Navarrete (born 9 July 1964) is a Chilean Indigenist activist who served in the Constitutional Council.

== Biography ==
Alihuén Antileo Navarrete was born on 9 July 1964 in Temuco, Chile. He is the son of Segundo Antileo Reimán and Viola Navarrete Zambrano.

He lived in Temuco until age five, then in Santiago until age eleven, and returned to Temuco at age thirteen. He spent part of his childhood in political exile in Switzerland with his mother and sister. Antileo is of Mapuche descent and is the father of one son.

=== Professional career ===
Antileo completed his primary and secondary education while living in Switzerland, where he also attended university and worked for several years. In 1986, he returned to Chile and enrolled in the History program at the University of Chile. He later studied law and in 2014 received a licentiate in legal sciences from the Universidad La República.

Professionally, Antileo has worked as a researcher on indigenous affairs and served as an academic and director of the program for indigenous peoples at the now-closed University ARCIS.

== Political career ==
Antileo’s involvement in politics began after his return from exile in 1986. He became a member of the Communist Youth and later was affiliated with the Frente Patriótico Manuel Rodríguez. In 1998, he was a founding member and spokesperson of the Coordinadora Arauco Malleco (CAM), an organization focused on Mapuche issues; he subsequently distanced himself from that group’s activities. Antileo also served as a spokesperson for the Plataforma Política Mapuche (PPM) in Santiago.

He was a candidate in the 2021 elections for the Constitutional Convention as part of the reserved seats for the Mapuche people but was not elected, receiving 7,078 votes, equivalent to 3.24% of the valid votes cast in that election.

In the elections held on 7 May 2023, Antileo ran as a candidate for the Constitutional Council representing the Indigenous Peoples’ constituency. According to the Electoral Qualification Court (TRICEL), he was elected with 160,870 votes.

Antileo took office as a member of the Constitutional Council on 7 June 2023, representing the Indigenous Peoples’ constituency. Within the Council, he served on the Commission on Political System, Constitutional Reform, and Form of the State.
