= Flag of the Mapuches =

Flags of the Mapuche people

There are multiple Mapuche flag designs used as emblems of the Mapuche Indigenous people and the Mapuche communities and Indigenist political organizations in Chile and Argentina.

== In Chile ==
Wenufoye flag

In Chile, where most Mapuche live, the main symbol used is a flag called "Wenufoye", which means "the heaven's winter's bark" in the Mapudungun language. This flag was adopted by the indigenist political organisation Aukiñ Wallmapu Ngulamon 5 October 1992. The flag was selected from among approximately 500 designs in a competition that began in March 1991.

The use of the Wenufoye has spread to members of other organizations, including those actively involved in the Mapuche conflict. The flag has also been officially adopted in some Chilean municipalities for use alongside the Chilean flag and the local flag, as in the cases of Coyhaique, Padre Las Casas, and others. According to historian Fernando Pairicana, this was the result of a consensus among communities from different territories aimed at bringing Mapuche demands to the forefront.

Starting in 2010, a decree of the Comptroller General of the Republic of Chile authorized the raising of the Mapuche flag, coat of arms, or coat of arms alongside the national flag. In September 2011, a campaign was launched among Chilean municipalities to encourage the use of indigenous flags during certain ceremonies. The use of the flag by municipalities and state institutions was criticized in June 2017 by Aucán Huilcamán, involved in the creation of this flag, declaring that the intention of the flag was to represent the struggle of the Mapuche people and that the Office of the Comptroller had no authority to use it.

=== Symbolism ===
The colors and forms of this Mapuche flag represents:

- Yellow (chod or choz): renewal, symbol of the sun.
- Blue (kallfü): life, order, wealth and the universe. In Mapudungun, is also an adjective that could be translated as "sacred" or "spiritual".
- White (lüq): the cleansing, healing and longevity symbol of wisdom and prosperity
- Red (kelü): strength and power, symbol of history.
- Green (karü): the earth or nature, wisdom, fertility and healing power, symbol of the machi (Mapuche shaman).
- Cultrun (kultrung or kultrug), a "Mapuche drum": This is a percussion instrument for ceremonial and social use. It has a flat surface in which is represented the Earth's surface. There is drawn the circular design of the mapuche cosmovision: the Meli Witran Mapu (the four cardinal points), and also the sun, the moon, and the stars. This is a symbol of the knowledge of the world.
- Gemil (ngümin) Stepped cross or star, similar to the Chakana or Inca Cross, or rhombus with twisting border: represents the art of the handcrafting, the science and knowledge; symbol of the writing system.

Apart from the Wenufoye, on the same occasion, five other flags were created to represent the traditional regions and the subgroups inhabiting them: Huenteche, Lafquenche, Nagche and the Pehuenche and Huilliche peoples, who, as a result of araucanization, are included in the Mapuche nation.

Huenteche territory (Inapiremapu)

Lafquenche territory (Lafkenmapu)

Nagche territory (Lelfünmapu)

Pehuenche territory (Piremapu)

Huilliche territory (Futahuillimapu)

=== Huilliche flags ===
Flag of the General Council of the Chiefs of Chiloé

Flag of the General Assembly of the Fütawillimapu Chiefs

The Huilliche flag adopted by Aukiñ Wallmapu Ngulamon is not frequently used. The General Council of the Chiefs of Chiloé, the organization representing the Huilliche of the Chiloé archipelago, has a blue-brown and green tricolor with a yellow 8-pointed star in the canton. The General Assembly of the Fütawillimapu Chiefs, which includes the Huilliche of Osorno province, has a different flag called the Müpütuwe Ünen Triwe. The upper half is blue and depicts the moon and sun. The lower half is brown, with a laurel tree (triwe) in the center with a flame at its root.

== In Argentina ==
Flag of the Mapuche-Tehuelche communities.

In Argentina, there is a tricolor flag representing the Mapuche and Tehuelche peoples together. The Tehuelche are an indigenous people of eastern Patagonia, part of whom has undergone Araucanization. The flag is mainly used in the province of Chubut, while the Tehuelche in Santa Cruz, where Araucanization has not reached, use a different flag.

The flag has three stripes of yellow, white and blue, and a blue arrowhead in the middle stripe. The blue and yellow symbolize the sky and the sun. White is the color of the sacred horse, a spirit in Araucanian mythology. The arrow symbolizes war, this symbol is to be removed when the fight to regain dignity is over.

The history of the flag began in 1987, when Julio Antieco began negotiations with Mapuche communities to create a flag representing the Mapuche-Tehuelche people. On 6 November, 1991, during the first provincial meeting of chiefs and aboriginal communities in Trevelin, the new symbol was recognized. Through Law No. 4072, published on 5 April 1995, the Chubut Province recognized it as the "symbol and emblem of the aboriginal communities of the province."

== Historical flags ==
=== Guñelve flag ===
Guñelve flag

Flag painted on the fresco "Young Lautaro" by Pedro Subercaseaux in 1946.

It is not certain when the Mapuche began using flags as a symbol, and it is unlikely that any flags existed before Spanish contact. The known early mention of the colours of blue, white and red used by Mapuche warriors comes from Canto XXI of the epic poem La Araucana, written by Alonso de Ercilla in 1569. These colors were reused by the Patriots during the War of Independence and are still used on the flag of Chile. The first flag consisted of a white star on a blue background and was first mentioned in 1839, but already then it was referred to as an old symbol. This star was a symbol for the planet Venus, known as Guñelve. One theory is that the Guñelve flag may have also influenced the Chilean flag. The white star currently placed in the canton of the Chilean flag was introduced by Bernardo O'Higgins, a member of the Lautaro Lodge.

In 1934, the traditionalist and nationalist organization Araucan Federation, led by Manuel Aburto Panguilef, used a blue-yellow-white flag. This flag was used until the mid-1940s, but then fell into oblivion.

One of the versions of the Guñelve flag, sometimes confused with the historical flag, was painted on a fresco "Young Lautaro" by Pedro Subercaseaux in 1946.

=== Kingdom of Araucanía and Patagonia ===
blue-white-green flag (c. 1861)

green-blue-white flag (c. 1861)

In 1860, the Frenchman Orélie Antoine de Tounens arrived in Araucania and, with the support of several Mapuche loncos, began to organize the kingdom with himself as the constitutional king. De Tounens claimed to use a tricolour flag of blue-white-green, although sources also mention a green-blue-white arrangement. The Kingdom was unable to resist the Chilean forces during the Occupation of Araucanía. De Tounens himself was deported to France and the flag was forgotten in America, but a group of French citizens inspired by his story founded the "Court in Exile" which still functions as a micronation and still uses the flag.
