= Puelmapu =

Traditional Mapuche area in the Andes

pwel "east"
- People: Gününa künä (Puelche)
- Language: Gününa Küne
- Country: Pwelmapu

Puelmapu is the traditional Mapuche territory located east of the Andes. It covers much of Patagonia and the Pampas. Since the Conquest of the Desert (1878–1885) Puelmapu is part of Argentina.

It is a theater of the Mapuche conflict. In 1994, the native peoples achieved the recognition of their rights of pre-existence, identity and community territory, among others through the Constitutional Reform. However, Mapuche political prisoners are reported to face severe systemic racism, displacement, and the criminalisation of their ancestral land defence.
