= Luchsinger-Mackay case =

2013 criminal case in Chile

The Luchsinger-Mackay case is a Chilean legal case concerning the murder of an elderly couple, Werner Luchsinger and Vivianne Mackay, in 2013 in their house in Vilcún, Araucanía Region.

== Events ==
Their deaths occurred in the broader context of the Mapuche conflict. The attackers carried out an arson attack, and the bodies of the couple were found burned in their house. Shortly after the fire, the machi Celestino Córdova was arrested 1,750 meters from the scene. He remains the only person prosecuted in this case.

On the morning of January 4, 2013, Werner Luchsinger (75 years old) and his wife Vivianne Mackay (69 years old) were awakened by a group of individuals who began setting fire to their house. Luchsinger reportedly armed himself with a revolver, while Mackay attempted to call family and police.

Their son quickly arrived at the scene, followed by firefighters, who found their charred bodies in the house.

== Judicial Case ==
During the night, the police arrested machi Celestino Córdova (26 years old) 1,750 meters from the site of the fire. He had a gunshot wound to his leg, initially attributed to Luchsinger. However, this was not proven in court.

The Temuco court rejected the terrorist nature of the charges but nonetheless found the machi Celestino Córdova guilty on February 20, 2014.

In September 2017, the prosecutor of La Araucanía, Roberto Garrido, confirmed that there was a connection between members of the Weichán Auka Mapu and the Luchsinger-Mackay case. This was due to ongoing investigations showing the involvement of at least 25 individuals in the attack. The prosecutor confirmed that the investigations were still ongoing.
