= Adolfo Millabur =

Chilean politician (born 1966)

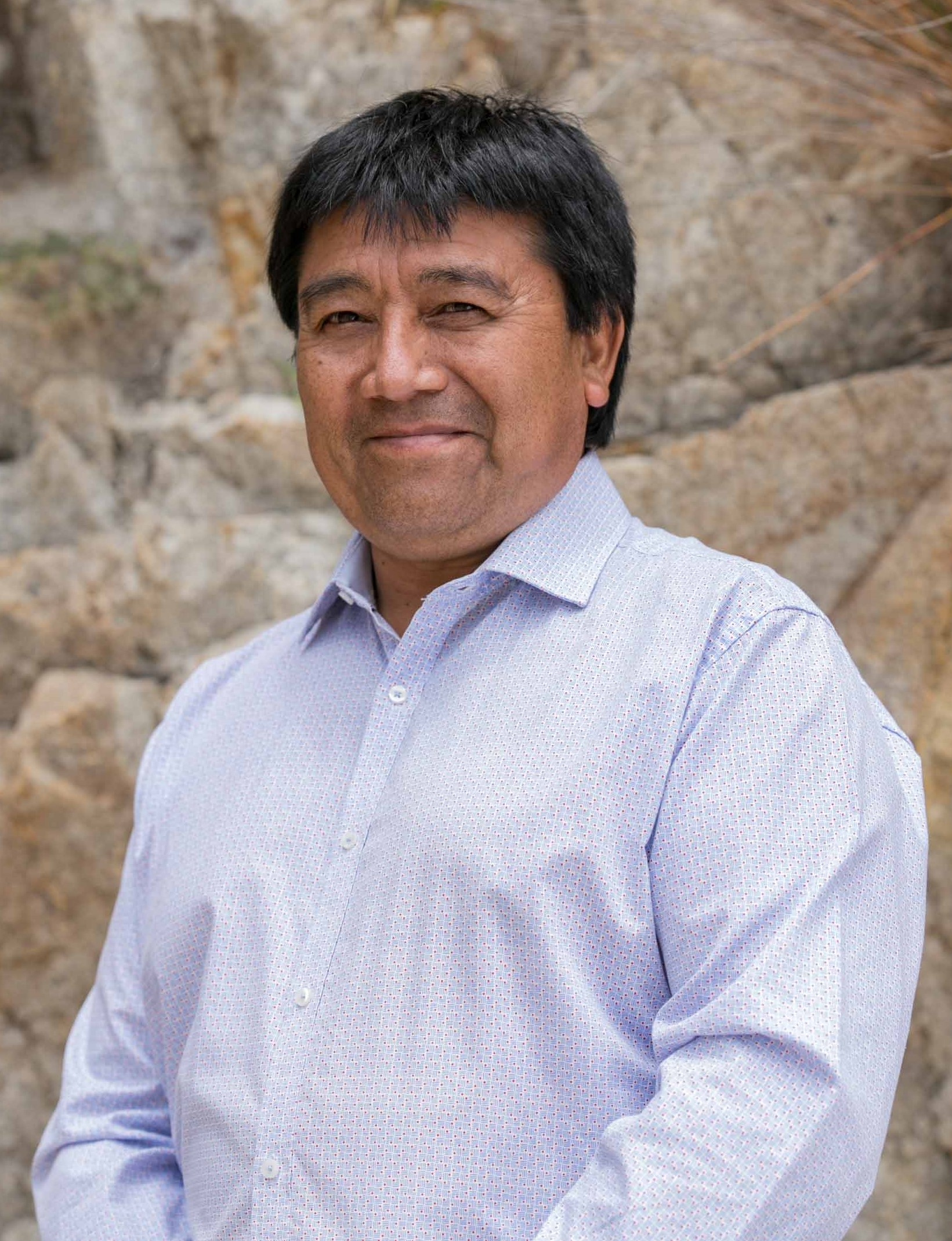

Member of the Constitutional Convention
- In office 4 July 2021 – 4 July 2022
- Constituency: Reserved seat

Personal details
- Born: 30 August 1966 (age 59) Tirúa, Chile

Adolfo Millabur Ñancuil (born 30 August 1966 in Tirúa, Arauco) is a Mapuche politician in Chile. Millabur served as Mayor of Tirúa from 1994 to 2011, holding the distinction of being the first Mapuche mayor in Chilean history.

== Early life ==
Millabur was raised in a family of eight brothers in El Malo, Biobío Region, located 35 kilometers from Tirúa. He stated that he would wake up at 5 AM every morning to walk 30 kilometers to school each day.

== Career ==
In 1992, Millabur was elected as a councillor in Tirúa. In 1996, he was elected to serve as Mayor of Tirúa, making him the first Mapuche mayor in Chilean history.

Millabur participated in the formation of the Lafkenche Territorial Identity organization, a group dedicated defending Mapuche autonomy and the recovery and preservation of the nation's traditional lands.

In 2021, Millabur resigned as Mayor of Tirúa to run to represent the Mapuche in one of the seven seats reserved for the nation on the Constitutional Convention. He was elected alongside human rights attorney Natividad Llanquileo.

== Personal life ==
Millabur is married to Sandra Ibarra and has one living son. In March 2019, Millabur's son Licán Millabur was found dead at the age of 24 at his home near Lleulleu lake, with signs pointing to a possible suicide.
