= Ngillatun =

Mapuche religious ceremony

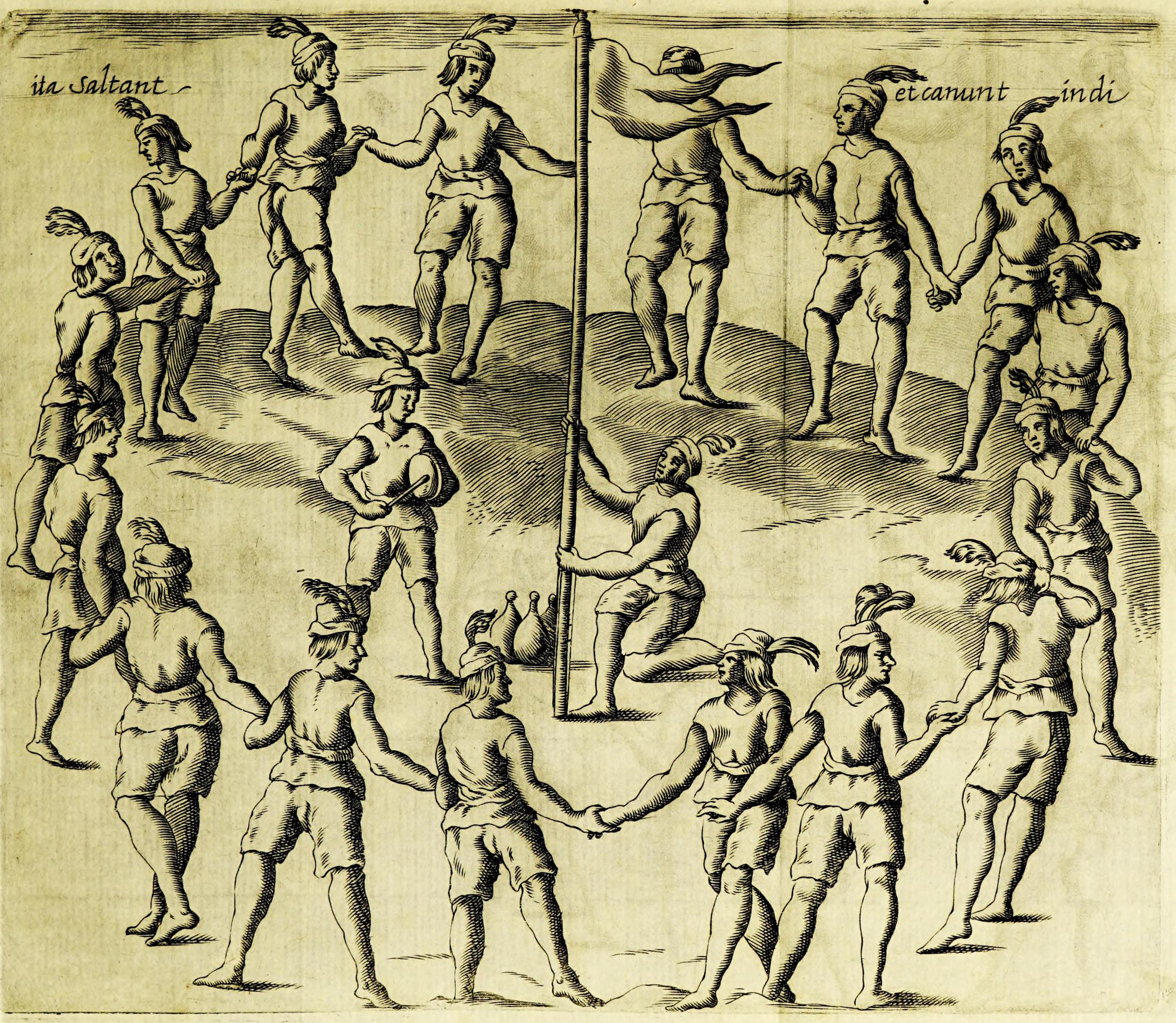
Depiction of a ngillatun from the Histórica relación del Reyno de Chile (1646).

The ngillatun (Mapudungun: ‘an act of purchase or petition’, rendered in Spanish as guillatún) is an ancient Mapuche religious ceremony. The rite is believed to form a connection to the spirit world in order to ask for health, for the strength of the community, or to give thanks for blessings received. In some areas or under certain conditions, the rite has special characteristics and is called a lepún or camaricún. An approximate translation frequently used in Spanish is rogativa ("prayer request").

== Description ==
The ngillatun has been described as "the main rituals" of contemporary Mapuche religion. The whole community takes part in the ngillatun rituals, which occur within a consecrated space. These involve prayers and animal sacrifices and are believed to maintain balance among cosmic forces and avoid catastrophe. The ngillatun ritual is designed to ensure cosmic wholeness, and is often performed both before and after the harvest.

The ngillatuwe is the collective altar; it is also called la cruza (the cross). It takes the form of a pole with the face and arms of either Ngünechen or an ancestor carved on it; it will face east and is thought to protect the community. A Catholic priest will often bless it after it has been erected. White and blue crosses, representing the powers of the sky, are often planted beside it. The ngillatuwe represents an axis mundi. It is located inside the ngillatun fields, which are deemed sacred and left uncultivated. If the ngillatuwe is destroyed it is believed that catastrophe will befall both the person responsible and the community to whom it belongs.

Until the early 20th century, the ngillatun was often led by male community elders known as ngenpin (orators). By the 21st century, the ngenpin were still officiating in the Pewenche and Williche areas but machi were instead doing so in the areas of the south-central valleys and the Andean foothills.

The ngillatun ritual can take over two days to complete. Those participating will typically wear Mapuche traditional clothing and may have their faces painted. During the ceremony, prayers are offered to Ngünechen, with offerings of maize, beans, and muday placed at the foot of the ngillatuwe. An animal such as a sheep would then be sacrificed. If the community is in danger and needs important messages, machi will go into a trance at the ngillatun but this does not always happen. Those assembled will dance both in rows and in a circle around the ngillatuwe. Men on horseback perform the awün, circling the dancers in imitation of the sun.

== In popular culture ==
Chilean folk singer Violeta Parra describes a ngillatun ceremony in her eponymous song, "Guillatún", recorded 1966. Filled with Mapudungun terminology, this song embraces an indigenous symbology and cosmology, alongside other works by Parra such as "Arauco tiene una pena" ("Arauco is ashamed"). Performing in the context of the South American folk music tradition, Parra was one of the first popular artists to directly incorporate indigenous, pre-Hispanic elements into her music, as well as emphasizing the previously overlooked contributions of female folk musicians in Chile.

== Bibliography ==
- Bacigalupo, Ana Mariella (2007). Shamans of the Foye Tree: Gender, Power, and Healing among Chilean Mapuche. Austin: University of Texas Press. ISBN 978-0-292-71658-2.
- Degarrod, Lydia Nakashima (1998). "Female Shamanism and the Mapuche Transformation into Christian Chilean Farmers". Religion. 28 (4): 339–350. doi:10.1006/reli.1998.0143.
- Parker Gumucio, Cristián (2002). "Religion and the Awakening of Indigenous People in Latin America". Social Compass. 49 (1): 67–81. doi:10.1177/0037768602049001006. S2CID 146434986.
