= Council of All Lands =

Indigenist separatist organization in South America

Consejo de Todas las Tierras
- Aukiñ Wallmapu Ngulam
- Mapuche flag adopted by the organization in 1992
- Formation: April 26, 1990; 36 years ago
- Founder: Aucán Huilcamán and others
- Founded at: Temuco
- Type: Political organization
- Purpose: Mapuche activism Indigenous rights
- Origins: Splinter group of ADMAPU
- Werkén: Aucán Huilcamán

The Council of All Lands (In Spanish Consejo de Todas las Tierras) or Aukiñ Wallmapu Ngulam (AWNg) is an indigenist separatist organization that defines itself as aimed to create a Mapuche state from land currently within Chile and Argentina in the territories defined as Wallmapu by them. Its leader is the werkén Aucán Huilcamán. The organization has its roots in the Commission for the 500 years of resistance (Comisión 500 años de resistencia), created in 1989 as a splinter group of ADMAPU, whose members had become critical of ADMAPU. The commission subsequently changed name to Consejo de Todas las Tierras in 1990.

== Flag creation ==
In March 1991, the Chilean Mapuche Indigenist political organisation Aukiñ Wallmapu Ngulam, also known as Council of All Lands, made a call to make the flag of the Mapuche people. About 500 designs were submitted, of which one was selected for the Mapuche people. The flag is called Wenufoye (in mapudungun The Heaven's Winter's Bark).

== See also ==
- Mapuche conflict
- Héctor Llaitul
- Aucán Huilcamán
- Association for Peace and Reconciliation in Araucanía

== Bibliography ==
- Christian Martínez Neira (2009). "Transición a la democracia, militancia y proyecto étnico. La fundación de la organización mapuche Consejo de Todas las Tierras (1978-1990)", en Estudios Sociológicos, Vol. XXVII, número 80, Mayo-Agosto.
- Mariman, José A. (1995). "La Organización mapuche Aukiñ Wallmapu Ngulam".
