= Weichán Auka Mapu =

Armed Mapuche revolutionary organization from Chile

Rebel Territory Struggle
- Weichán Auka Mapu
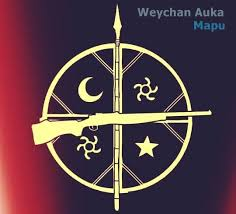
- The group's logo, commonly used on the pamphlets left behind after their attacks.
- Leader: Collective leadership
- Founded: Mid-2011
- Split from: Coordinadora Arauco-Malleco
- Country: Chile
- Active regions: Southern Zone: Araucanía Region; Biobío Region; Los Ríos Region
- Ideology: Collectivist anarchism Anti-capitalism; Anti-colonialism; Anti-fascism; Indigenism; Independence anarchism
- Political position: Far-left
- Status: Active
- Size: c. 20 militants

Weichán Auka Mapu (WAM) (English: Rebel Territory Struggle) is an armed Mapuche revolutionary organization that operates mainly in southern Chile, being a supporter of armed struggle through arson attacks, sabotage actions and clashes with firearms against police officers, in order to achieve full autonomy for the Mapuche people.

The WAM was founded in 2011, as a splinter group from the Coordinadora Arauco Malleco. It committed its first action on 17 December 2013, with an arson attack on a management house in Vilcún.

In May 2022, the Chamber of Deputies of Chile declared the Coordinadora Arauco-Malleco, Resistencia Mapuche Malleco, Resistencia Mapuche Lafkenche, and Weichán Auka Mapu as "illegal terrorist organizations."

As of December 2024 Weichán Auka Mapu rejects drug trafficking but admits that it had been the practice of some of its members in the past.

== History ==
=== Origins ===
In 2010, a dissident faction formed inside the Coordinadora Arauco Malleco (CAM). They disagreed with the possibility of engaging in dialogue between Mapuche representatives and the Chilean Government, since they considered that negotiations would interfere with the project of Mapuche National Liberation. Following the course taken by the CAM, the dissatisfied former militants chose to found their own organization in order to continue their violent actions.

In their first statement released on 20 April 2016 where they explain the reason for their "armed resistance" and the meaning of their coat of arms. The cultrun represents "the totality of our Wallmapu and the 4 parts of the spiritual basis of existence as a People-Nation". The spear symbolizes their ancestral resistance and the shotgun symbolizes their present resistance, calling it "rudimentary but worthy." In addition to the way in which the spear and shotgun were placed, the statement "states that said weapons are not invasive, but are an integral part of our Mapuche Nation People."

=== Arson attacks ===
2013

On 4 January 2013 Werner Luchsinger and Vivianne Mackay, a couple of wealthy farmers, were murdered in an arson fire in their country house located in Vilcún, in 2013. In September 2017, the prosecutor of La Araucanía, Roberto Garrido, confirmed that there was a connection between members of the Weichán Auka Mapu and the Luchsinger-Mackay case. This was due to ongoing investigations showing the involvement of at least 25 individuals in the attack. The prosecutor confirmed that the investigations were still ongoing.

2017

On 17 June 2017, a truck with a hopper and several machines were destroyed in Puerto Saavedra, in a new arson attack in the area that affected the construction company CIAL Ltd. Carabineros said that five people participated in the event, and that they had attacked two guards.

On 26 July of the same year, Chilean authorities said that an evangelical church was set on fire in a southern region that the Mapuche indigenous group claim as their ancestral territory.

On 19 August, an arson attack affected 18 trucks belonging to the Calafquén transportation company, located at kilometer 686 of Route 5 south of Temuco. A brochure was found on the site that attributed the incident to the Mapuche group.

On 26 August, at least 29 trucks were burned in San José de la Mariquina. In place, they left a brochure where the Weichan Auka Mapu group took responsibility for the attack. On 10 August 2018, a group of Mapuche militants burned an evangelical church in the municipality of Budimallín. At the site of the attack, canvases related to the Mapuche cause were found.

2018

On 11 August 2018, six WAM militants were indicted for their participation in an attack on a farm in Cuyinpahué, owned by Forestal Arauco.

2019

On 12 September 2019, members of the WAM set fire to two sheds in the Santa Adela farm, located in the Nueva Imperial district, leaving behind leaflets belonging to the group. Later the government confirmed a complaint for a terrorist arson after the attack was reported.

2020

A fire caused to the San Fidel major seminary was reported in Padre Las Casas, with no casualties reported in the attack. The attack occurred at approximately 3:30 a.m., partially destroying the facilities and leaving a canvas.

== See also ==
- Mapuche conflict
- Anarchism in Chile
