= Aucán Huilcamán =

Chilean politician (born 1965)

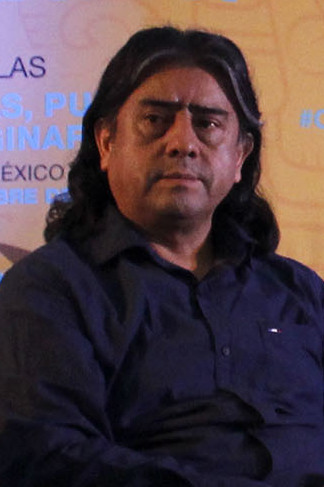
Aucán Huilcamán in 2017

Aucán Huilcamán Paillama (born January 31, 1965) is the leader ("werkén") of the indigenist Mapuche organization Consejo de Todas las Tierras ("Council of all lands"). He intended to run for president in the 2005 election in Chile, but his candidacy was not accepted as he was not able to collect enough official votes validated by public notaries.

== Biography ==
He was born in the Mapuche community of Collimque, in the commune of Lumaco, Malleco province. His father was José Luis Huilcamán, the lonco of Collinque, who died in 2005, and his mother was Claudina Paillama, who died in 2003.

=== Youth and Werkén of Admapu ===
He was born in the Mapuche community of Collimque, in the commune of Lumaco, Malleco province. His father was José Luis Huilcamán, Lonco of Collinque, who died in 2005, and his mother was Claudina Paillama, who died in 2003. He studied at the Gabriel Mistral School.

During the Military Dictatorship in Chile (1973-1989) —led by Augusto Pinochet— he witnessed human rights violations committed against Mapuche community members, including his father. In the late 1980s, he was a leader of the organization ADMAPU. entity founded by his father in 1979, where he worked as werkén.

=== Werkén of the Council of All Lands ===
In 1990 he was one of the founders of the Council of All Lands (Aukiñ Wallmapu Ngulam) of which he assumed the permanent position of werkén,representing the organization and the Mapuche people in international forums such as the United Nations (UN) and the Organization of American States (OAS).

He studied law for three years at the Universidad Autónoma del Sur in Temuco; However, he had to put his studies on hold in 1992.

During that year, the Council of All Lands carried out a series of protests and demonstrations within the framework of the Fifth Centenary of the Discovery of America, which included the creation of the current Mapuche flag, the recovery of lands and the formation of a «Mapuche parliament, for the latter being accused and convicted along with 140 other Mapuche community members of participating in an association illicit, according to the first instance judgment of March 11, 1993, confirmed by the Temuco Court of Appeals on September 6, 1994, and which was the subject of a motion for reconsideration rejected by the Supreme Court on March 27, 1996.

Following this decision by the Chilean courts, in September 1996 Huilcamán filed a petition with the Inter-American Commission on Human Rights (IACHR), denouncing an "unjust judicial persecution" and violation of the human rights of those prosecuted by the Chilean State, a case that was titled "Aucan Huilcamán et al. v. Chile". The petition was admitted by the IACHR in its report of February 27, 2002.

After studying international humanitarian law in Rome and Geneva, he worked at the UN between 1993 and 1999. which delivered a report to Lagos on October 28, 2003.

== See also ==
- Mapuche conflict
- Héctor Llaitul
- Council of All Lands
