= 2010 Mapuche hunger strike =

In Araucania, southern Chile, resides a large Indigenous group by the name of the Mapuche. This group makes up the majority of individuals living in this region. They were deprived of their territorial and political rights after Chile declared independence from Spain. This decision resulted in the government forcing the Mapuche to live on reserves that they were forbidden to having full ownership of. Due to the perceived injustices they had been experiencing, they decided to start a hunger strike in hopes of changing the current property laws.

== Background ==
During 2009, the president of Social Democrats Michelle Bachelet had suggested a proposal that the government should buy privately owned land in order to help accommodate for land that the Mapuche had lost. The landowners, however, were unwilling to sell. After the election of President Sebastian Piñeira, there was collusion between these owners and Carabineros, the Chilean gendarmerie in order to protect their interests. The intervention of Carabineros escalated to violence because Mapuche protesters had set fire to machinery and land that had belonged to private owners. In consequence, anti-terrorist laws were invoked against the Mapuche activists.

On 12 July 2010, in response to their imprisonment, they decided to begin a hunger strike to protest against being charged under the terrorist act. It was stated that individuals who have been declared guilty under the act of terrorism are forced to suffer through a more intense sentence in comparison to if they were charged under a criminal case. They would also face a punishment that resulted in getting their citizenship repelled. Additionally, during the 15 years after their release, they would be banned from getting any government job. Circumstances had further escalated during 2001, when the Chilean government decided to make alterations to their law. They had chosen to focus primarily on cases surrounding theft, destruction of land, and arson.

== Hunger strike ==
A major inspiration that also sparked the idea of initiating a hunger strike was Patricia Troncoso. She along with other Mapuche activists had been convicted with arson in 2002, when a fire caused mass destruction of 100 hectares of pine plantations. Troncoso along with the other activists had started a 111-day hunger strike in 2007. The ill treatment of Mapuche people had been a breaking point for the activists and had inspired a request of 20 Mapuche activists who were in a likewise position, to be released from imprisonment. Also for the government to reconstruct the Terrorism Act, due to the fact of the improper way it was formulated.

The government eventually denied many other requests of hers, and only succumbed to lessening her sentence to an extent. Following the decision of defining the acts demonstrated by Mapuche activists as terrorism, there was a lot of disapproval from the International Federation of Human Rights, and Amnesty International. More attention arose on 12 July 2010, when 14 additional individuals joined the strike. Over the first two months in specific, many of the activists that participated, had been scattered across five separate prisons throughout southern Chile. All of these prisoners were apparent victims of receiving false allegations towards them such as attempted murder, injury done to the body, and setting fires.

Despite this conflict, there had been an unforeseen amount of support that was provided by four members of the Congress that were a part of the Human Rights Commission. On September 9, 2010, they had joined the strikers and gave their encouragement and approval by fasting individually on their own time. Sebastian Piñeira reacted to their agreement by suggesting revamping the Terrorist Act. His intentions were to reduce the sentences affiliated with terrorist charges and ban the process of minors and civilians being charged in military court. The protesters had rejected his offer, vindicating their demands of the charges against them to be dropped in entirety.

=== 12 August-8 October 2010 ===
The journey continued on with a fierce battle into 12 August 2010. The family members of the protesters created a delegation and proceeded to Valparaiso to get together with Congress members and declare the complaints of the prisoners. The following day, they had met with Supreme Court Chief Justice, Milton Juica and other representatives. On 1 October 2010, 24 strikers had agreed to sign an approval to conclude their fast with the Piñeira government. Following the deal, the government had decided to retract the terrorism charges. They also came to terms with agreeing to modify the anti-terrorist law and the relatively minor acts that were regarded as terrorism charges. It was concluded that these crimes should be deemed as common offences instead.

On 8 October 2010, an additional ten strikers had also signed as well. Following the signing, their spokesman had announced that despite their decision to sign, they did not feel they were being fully compensated with the final terms of the agreement. This also resulted in having other participants continue their fasting in hospital. This action was done in hope that the government would consider further rectitude on their injustice. Thereafter the completion of the strike, the Mapuche have however been facing continuous persecution under the Terrorist Act.

=== 1 March-10 October 2011 ===
Due to their constant state of injustice there had been four Mapuche prisoners that began another hunger strike on 1 March 2011, which remained for 87 days in total. It was done to protest against the law and coerce the government to decrease their sentences. More action against the law had occurred on 10 October 2011, when roughly ten thousand people had engaged in a non-violent march in the capital Santiago, to support and show awareness for the ongoing battle that Indigenous people have been facing.

== Conclusion ==
This action has sparked much attention, but it has not yet received any dedication from the government. There was a moment of hope on 13 March 2014, when the Chilean government apologized for confiscating their land for several years.

== See also ==
- Mapuche conflict
- Indigenous peoples in Chile
- Hunger strike
