= Mapuche conflict =

Political conflict in Chile and Argentina (1997–present)

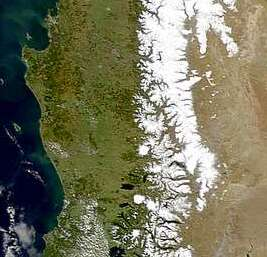
Date	December 1997–present
Location	Araucanía, Biobío and Los Ríos regions of Chile & Neuquén Province of Argentina
Status	Ongoing

Belligerents
Chile: Chilean Armed Forces; Argentina: Armed Forces of the Argentine Republic; Armed civilians	Armed Mapuche Indigenist Insurgents and Allies: Coordinadora Arauco-Malleco; Resistencia Ancestral Mapuche; Weichán Auka Mapu; Resistencia Mapuche Malleco; NANGU; Mapuche National Liberation Movement; Mapuche Lavkenche Resistance; Mapuche Pewenche Resistance

Commanders and leaders
José Antonio Kast; Javier Milei	Héctor Llaitul (surrendered); Facundo Jones Huala; Aucán Huilcamán

Casualties and losses
6 carabineros killed 1 PDI officer killed 15 civilians killed 400 trucks destroyed 10 churches set on fire agricultural machinery destroyed	15 killed

The Mapuche conflict (Spanish: conflicto mapuche) is a political and armed conflict that involves indigenous Mapuche communities (historical exonym: Araucanians), located in Araucanía and nearby regions of Chile and Argentina.

The first attack, marking the beginning of the period of violence in the Southern Macrozone of Chile, occurred in December 1997 with the burning of three trucks. Since then, violence has progressively increased and expanded to the neighboring regions of Biobío and Los Lagos.

The conflict itself is related to the land ownership disputes between Argentina and Chile since the 19th century as well as corporations such as big forestry companies and their contractors. In the past decade of the conflict, Chilean police and some non-indigenous landowners have been confronted by indigenist militant Mapuche organizations and local Mapuche communities in the context of the conflict. Some scholars argue the conflict is an indigenous self-determination conflict; others like Francisco Huenchumilla see it as the expression of a wider political conflict that affects all of Chile given the existence of other indigenous groups.

The area where the conflict has been most violent is known as "Zona Roja" (lit. Red Zone) and lies in the provinces of Arauco and Malleco. In May 2022, the Chamber of Deputies of Chile declared the Coordinadora Arauco-Malleco, and other three armed organizations as "illegal terrorist organizations".

Mapuche indigenist activists demand greater autonomy, recognition of rights, and the return of what they consider "historical ancestral lands", which some families have documents prove their ownership of specific lands with the "Títulos de Merced" and others apply it as a broader concept, not having family ties to the land. The Mapuche conflict intensified following the return of democracy in the 1990s, with indigenist activists seeking to rectify the loss of what they call "ancestral territory" during the Occupation of the Araucanía and the Conquest of the Desert. The Mapuche Indigenists lack a central organization. Individuals and communities carry out their struggle independently by different means. Some groups, such as the Coordinadora Arauco-Malleco (CAM), have used violent tactics since 1998, while other groups have preferred non-violent tactics and institutional negotiations. Violent activists have been scrutinized for their finances and international links, with some being accused of large-scale theft of wood, either by performing the theft themselves or taking possession of stolen wood. Others have been linked to drug trafficking. (Note: In December 2024 members of Weichán Auka Mapu issued a communiqué admitting that in the past some of its members have engaged in drug trafficking and denounced this practice as contrary to their revolutionary ideals.) Personnel of Coordinadora Arauco-Malleco have been in Venezuela meeting high-ranking officials of the Nicolás Maduro government. (Note: There are also claims of members of Coordinadora Arauco-Malleco training with FARC guerrillas in Colombia.)

The handling of the conflict by Chilean authorities has been the subject of controversy and political debate. The label of "terrorism" by authorities has been controversial as well as the killing of unarmed Mapuches by police followed by failed cover-ups. Another point of contest is the "militarization of Araucanía", yet the use of military-grade long guns against police vehicles has been cited as explaining the need for armoured vehicles. There are recurrent claims of Mapuche "political prisoners" for people related to armed groups. (Note: Human Rights Watch Director José Miguel Vivanco have asserted in December 2020 that "there are no political prisoners in Chile", a view echoed by former President Sebastián Piñera in 2021. Similarly, the existence of Mapuche political prisoners has been rejected in 2022 by Manuel Monsalve, subsecretary of the Ministry of the Interior and Public Security.)

The conflict has received the attention of international human rights organizations such as Amnesty International, which have criticized the Chilean government's treatment of the Mapuche. As of 2009, a dozen activists have died as a result of the repression. Mapuche police and Mapuche contractors have also been killed by violent activists. Recently, the MACEDA database has compiled more than 2,600 events related to this conflict (1990–2016).

The official 2002 Chilean census found 609,000 Chileans identifying as Mapuches. The same survey determined that 35 percent of the nation's Mapuches think the biggest issue for the government to resolve relates to their ancestral properties. The official 2012 Chilean census found the number of Mapuches in Chile to be 1,508,722 and the 2017 census a total of 1,745,147, representing around 10% of the population.

== Historical background ==
=== Arauco War and coexistence with Hispanic Chile (1541–1810) ===
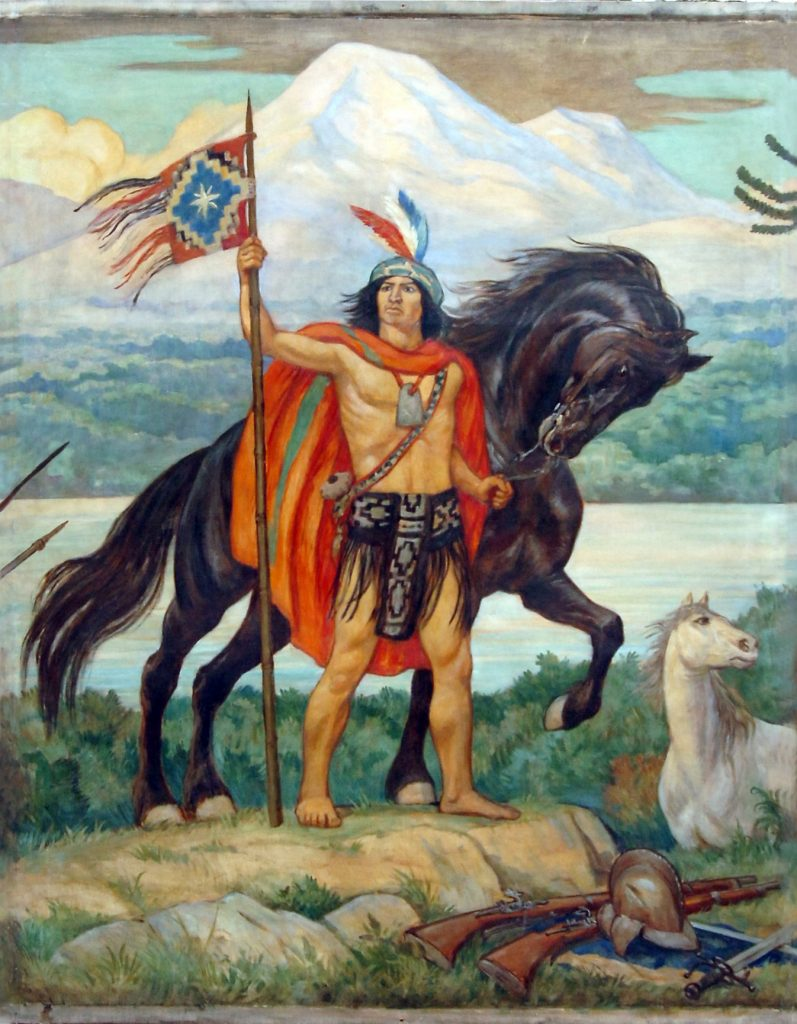
Lautaro, a military leader of the Arauco War

The conflict has a historical background in the Arauco War, which varied in intensity and had several peace periods because of agreements between the Hispanic Monarchy and Mapuche tribes. During this time, the Mapuche people, better known as the Reche (Ethnonym meaning: authentic human being) at this time, were divided into three sub-groups living in and around the region of what is now central and south-central Chile between the Aconcagua River and the Chiloé. The Pikunche (Mapudungan for people from the north) lived in the northern part of this region and were defeated by the Spanish conquistadors in the 16th century. As a result, the Pikunche lost all ownership of their lands and were forcibly assimilated into Spanish society. The Huilliche (Mapudungan for people from the South) lived in the South of the region between the Valdivia River and the Chiloé Archipelago. They survived the conflict with the Spanish due to the relatively light presence of the Spanish in this particular part of the region and due to the fact that they posed no threat to Spanish outposts in the area. Lastly, the central Reche, who inhabited the region between the Maule and Tolten Rivers, regularly entered into violent conflict with the Spanish and successfully held off the colonial power.

The central Reche eventually experienced a large societal transformation due to the introduction of the horse to their society which resulted in economic changes in trade, political restructuring, and a relocation of the people. This transformation took place between the second half of the 16th century and the end of the 18th century and led to the emergence of a new cultural identity for the group originating from the central Reche into the Mapuche.

Eventually after a sustained period of war between the Mapuche and Spanish lasting for about a century, the two sides came together and created a peace agreement called the Treaty of Quilin in 1641. The treaty and various agreements that followed legally recognized the Mapuche as distinct and autonomous people from the Spanish, being part of the territories of the Catholic Monarchy, as well as established a border between Spanish and indigenous lands at the Bio Bio River. This agreement effectively put an end to the large-scale conflict between the Mapuche and the Spanish, although small conflicts continued between the two sides until decolonization in the early 19th century. The Mapuche were the only indigenous group under Spanish control from the 16th–19th century to gain full independence. Although the two cultures were independent of one another, they continued to trade and share agricultural practices.

=== Mapuches and the Republic of Chile (1810–1973) ===
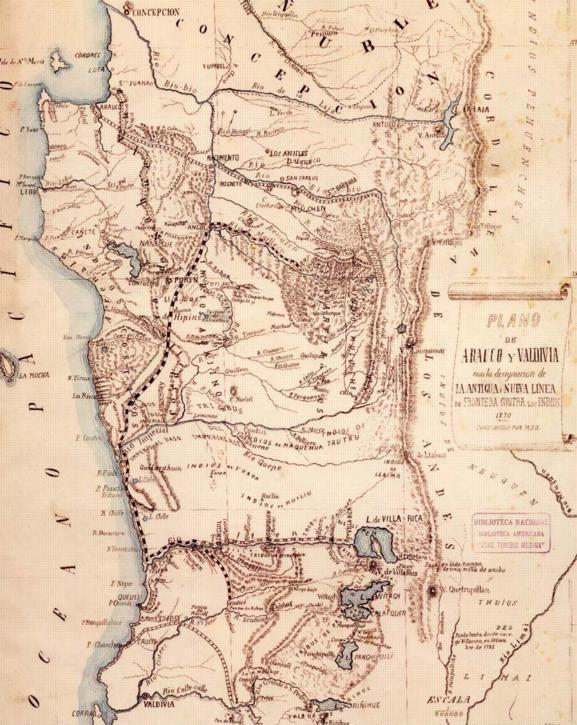
Map showing the "old" and the "new" frontier established by 1870

During the Independence war, some Mapuche tribes fought in favor of the Hispanic Monarchy, and some others for the Republic. After Chile successfully achieved independence from the Spanish Empire, the peace between the Mapuche and those inhabiting the rest of Chile effectively evaporated. Although the Spanish Empire still legally recognized the Mapuche as authonomous following decolonization, no such agreement existed with the newly independent Chilean government. The conflict rooted in land ownership issues.

The Chilean government did eventually recognize the Mapuche as distinct people through the formation of the Indigenous Settlement Commission in 1813 which was created to help move the Mapuche reservations. Additionally, The Decree of March 4, 1819 by President Bernardo O'Higgins recognized the ability of Mapuche peoples to enter into legal contracts, the law of July 10, 1823 recognized Mapuche rights to property, and the Treaty of Tapihue in 1825 officially recognized the Mapuche as a state within Chile. While these laws were being passed by the Chilean government, the Chilean population continued to slowly encroach and acquire Mapuche land, often through deceptive and unfair means. In 1866 the Chilean government passed the Indigenous Reservations Law which led to mass rebellion by the Mapuche people in 1870 and 1880.

After the Frenchman, Orélie-Antoine de Tounens, tried to create the Kingdom of Araucanía and Patagonia in the region, the Chilean government started the "Pacification of Araucania" movement between 1862 and 1883. The movement was essentially an occupation of Araucania by the Chilean Army in the late 19th century. After 1881 the land was divided into plots and distributed mostly among private owners (including foreign and Chilean settlers as well as members of the army). The Mapuche (around 100,000 persons according to the 1907 Census) were confined to almost 3,000 atomized reservations named titulos de merced. The actions by the Chilean government were essentially an effort by the government to incorporate the territories which were previously authonomous de facto. In 1962, the Chilean government passed the Law of Agrarian Reform which made all lands taken from the Mapuche before 1946 dedicated for public use. Encroachment efforts appeared to subside when Salvadore Allende was elected president as his government was responsible for restoring significant amounts of Mapuche land. In particular, Law 17.729 helped to restore almost 850,000 acres of Mapuche land and gave the Mapuche people stronger land ownership rights. Many Mapuche were actively involved in the Chilean land reform. More than 150,000 hectares of land were transferred to the communities.

=== Chilean dictatorship (1973–1990) ===
Most of the land that was regained by the Mapuche under the Allende Presidency was later taken back during the counter-agrarian reform process implemented during the military dictatorship (1973–1990). Specifically, in 1973 the successful military coup of General Augusto Pinochet established a military dictatorship that effectively reversed many of the policies of the Allende government. Specifically, the Pinochet government did not recognize the Mapuche as a distinct group within Chile, but an integral part of it. Instead, the government only recognized its people as Chilean citizens. Additionally, all of the land regained by the Mapuche during the Allende government was returned to previous owners or opened up to development. Unlike the previous Allende Government, Pinochet focused on giving individual land property and not collective. The dictatorship transferred land to thousands of indigenous families. Between 1978 and 1990, 69.984 individual land titles were given. At that time the Mapuche leaders did not consider their new "private property" an offense to their ancestors. In February 1989, General Augusto Pinochet had a meeting with the groups belonging to the Mapuche "Regional Councils" who gave him the title of "Ulmen Futa Lonco", which means "Great Authority" in Mapuche language.

The diploma that was given said: "The General Board of Loncos and Chiefs of Nueva Imperial and the 30 communes of the IX Region of Araucanía, agreed to name H.E., the President of the Republic Captain General Augusto Pinochet Ugarte, Ulmen Futa Lonco".

From the 1980s onward, large swathes of southern Chile became integrated into the country's export economy, forming what has been described as an enclave economy. The central component of this is the forestry sector, with several plantations in plots that were originally part of the land reform and others in plots claimed by communities. In 1988 a referendum was held in which the "No" option won, and in 1989 Patricio Aylwin was elected President of Chile, assuming office in 1990.

=== Chilean transition to democracy (1990–1996) ===
The Wenufoye flag was created in 1992 by Aucán Huilcamán from the Indigenist political organisation, Council of All Lands.

The Mapuche conflict continued in the 1990s following the return of democracy. The conflict started in areas inhabited mostly by Mapuches like the vicinities of Purén, where the indigenous communities have been demanded that their ancestral lands, which were now the property of logging corporations, farming companies, and individuals, be turned over to them. At this time, forestry companies owned three times more ancestral Mapuche land than the actual Mapuche people.

In 1993, the Chilean government passed the Indigenous Peoples Act which recognized Mapuche participation, land, cultural, and development rights. Additionally, the law created the National Indigenous Development Corporation (CONADI), an indigenous governing body founded to help support the development of indigenous peoples in Chile. While the law gave substantial promise of reconciliation and justice to the Mapuche people, in reality, the act continues to be extremely underwhelming and disappointing to most Mapuche people in contemporary society.

=== Mapuche Activist Movements and Government Responses ===
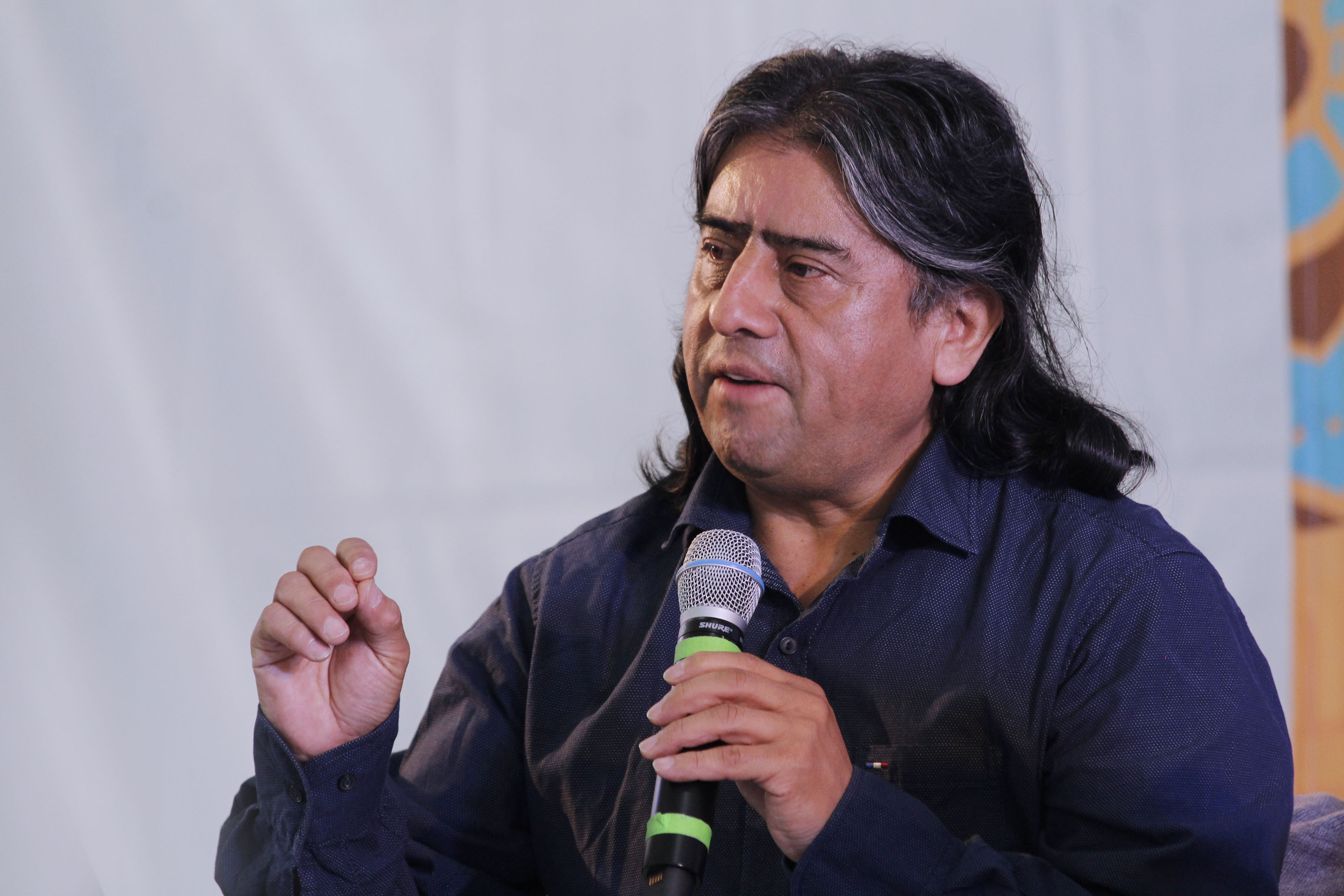
Aucán Huilcamán, a Mapuche Indigenist political activist

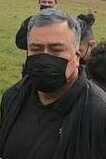
Héctor Llaitul, leader of the CAM armed organization

The term "Wallmapu" began to gain widespread use outside Mapudungun-speaking communities after the Council of All Lands adopted its Mapudungun name, Aukiñ Wallmapu Ngulam, upon the organization's founding in 1990. It arose in response to what indigenous movements describe as "repression" and the perceived disregard of land deeds (Títulos de Merced). This was accompanied by a wave of Mapuche migration from the south-central region to major Chilean cities during the Chilean military dictatorship and before. The council was notable for engaging in historical revisionism and adopting political stances opposing the Chilean state's interests in the region, particularly regarding demands for "ancestral land recovery" and "political territorial autonomy for the Mapuche people." This movement also included the creation of the Wenufoye national Mapuche flag in 1992, along with five additional flags representing key Mapuche territories in southern Chile. Since 2005, the term has also been promoted by the Mapuche nationalist party Wallmapuwen.

The Chilean historian Cristóbal García Huidobro states that: "the terminology 'Wallmapu' is not a relatively old one, but rather a newer one. It arises, as far as it has been understood, from a revisionist movement, at the beginning of the 1990s (...) they make a re-study and a revisionism of the identity, of the language, as well as of the symbols that would represent the Mapuche people (...) it is not a historical question as such, it does not come from the ancestral culture of the Mapuche people who never perceived their territory as a particularly defined place". The term means "Universe" ancestraly in the Mapuche language.

The Council reinforced the concept of self-determination through a long ideological process led by various intellectuals. In parallel, in late 1989, several groups began land occupations in Lumaco and other areas. In the 1990s, autonomist ideas also permeated some regional prisons.

As Chile transitioned to democracy in urban areas, a political project aimed at the "reconstruction of Wallmapu" emerged in indigenous southern territories. This initiative was ignored by Chilean political elites.

The construction of the Ralco Hydroelectric Plant, which displaced indigenous burial sites, was a breaking point in state-Mapuche relations, contributing to the formation of the Coordinadora Arauco-Malleco (CAM) in 1997 following the burning of three trucks belonging to Forestal Arauco. This event marked the beginning of the violence in the Southern Macrozone of Chile (also known as Araucanía conflict) and a turning point in the development of the Mapuche autonomist political movement. Since then, violence has progressively increased and expanded to the neighboring regions of Biobío and Los Lagos.

The CAM, which defines itself as anti-capitalist and "in resistance against neoliberalism," uses violence to reclaim lands it considers usurped during the Occupation of Araucanía and now held by large landowners and extractive industries. These areas serve as the foundation for territorial control, which the CAM views as essential for self-determination and the holistic development of indigenous activists. CAM leaders, such as Héctor Llaitul, represent a newer, more separatist generation compared to figures like Aucán Huilcamán, founder of the Council of All Lands.

In May 2022, the Chamber of Deputies of Chile declared the Coordinadora Arauco-Malleco, Resistencia Mapuche Malleco, Resistencia Mapuche Lafkenche, and Weichán Auka Mapu as "illegal terrorist organizations."

=== 1996–2004: Ralco controversy ===
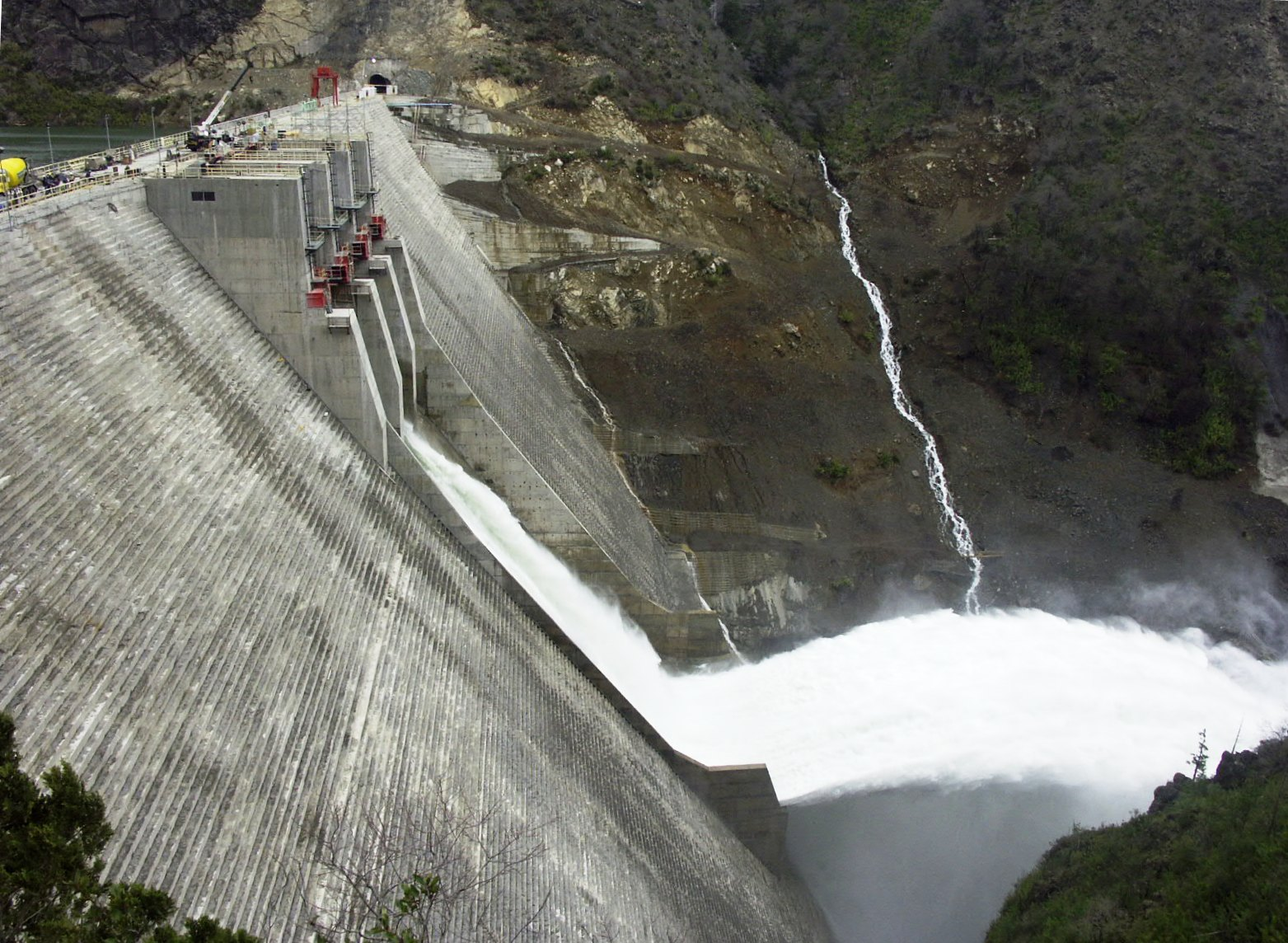
The construction of the Ralco Hydroelectric Plant involved the relocation of Mapuche communities through land swaps, against the will of some families. Additionally, cemeteries and sacred ancestral sites important to the Mapuche religion were flooded.

In the early 1990s, Spanish utility company Endesa initiated the Biobío Hydroelectric Dam project, including a series of dams on the Upper BíoBío River. The dams, particularly the Ralco Dam, led to the displacement of Mapuche/Pehuenche communities due to flooding of ancestral lands. The World Bank's involvement through its International Finance Corporation (IFC) drew criticism for policy violations, prompting internal reforms.

In 1978, ENDESA, the National Electric Enterprise created by the State undertook hydroelectric projects on the BioBio River. The building of the Pangue dam (1996–1997) caused flooding of 500 hectares occupied by the Pehuenche communities. Many of the Pehuenche signed away their land rights due to the lack of literacy among the people. The flooding led to ancestral cemeteries being washed away and the relocation of families and communities. After the construction of the Pangue Dam, the relatively isolated Bio Bio River attracted timber contractors who would give landowners an undisclosed amount of money for the harvesting of their trees.

After the success of the Pangue Dam, the conception of the Ralco Dam began. The Ralco Dam was initially supposed to be the biggest dam proposed for the BioBio, constructed 27 kilometers from the Pangue Dam. At over 155 meters tall, it would flood 3,400 hectares of land to generate 570 megawatts of electricity. The proposed Ralco Dam would displace approximately 500 to 1,000 persons comprising 91 families of the Quepuca-Ralco and Ralco-Lepoy. The dam would also threaten 27 species of mammals, 10 species of amphibians, 9 species of reptiles, and 8 species of fish. The Ralco Dam finished construction in 2004.

In response to the controversies surrounding the Ralco Dams' construction, the Chilean Government signed the INFORME N° 30/04, PETICIÓN 4617/02, SOLUCION AMISTOSA, with the Inter-American Commission on Human Rights. The Government promised to not build any more mega-projects and hydroelectric projects on Indigenous lands surrounding the Bio Bio River.

Despite the Chilean government's commitments to the Inter-American Commission on Human Rights to halt such projects on Indigenous lands, further controversial dams like Angostura and Rucalhue were developed. These continued to affect the local communities by flooding lands and threatening cultural traditions. Resistance has grown, particularly among youth, who have organized sit-ins, plebiscites, and petitions against the ongoing developments.

The initial construction of the Ralco dam was met with controversy due to the indigenous Mapuche being relocated. While the displaced were given monetary repayment, many complained that it was too little compared to the dam company's profits. Many protests have been held over the events of the construction of the Ralco Dam. There have been sit-ins that have blocked access roads to the plant for machinery and workers. All sit-ins have ended quickly where participants eventually get evicted, however, the construction of the Ralco Dam has increased citizen participation.

There have been increased protections in place from the actions of the construction of the Ralco Dam. The National Corporation for Indigenous Development (CONADI) to "protect yet substantially develop lands." CONANDI was put in place to negotiate between indigenous peoples and corporations to acquire disputed land for return to the indigenous groups.

=== 2009 incidents ===
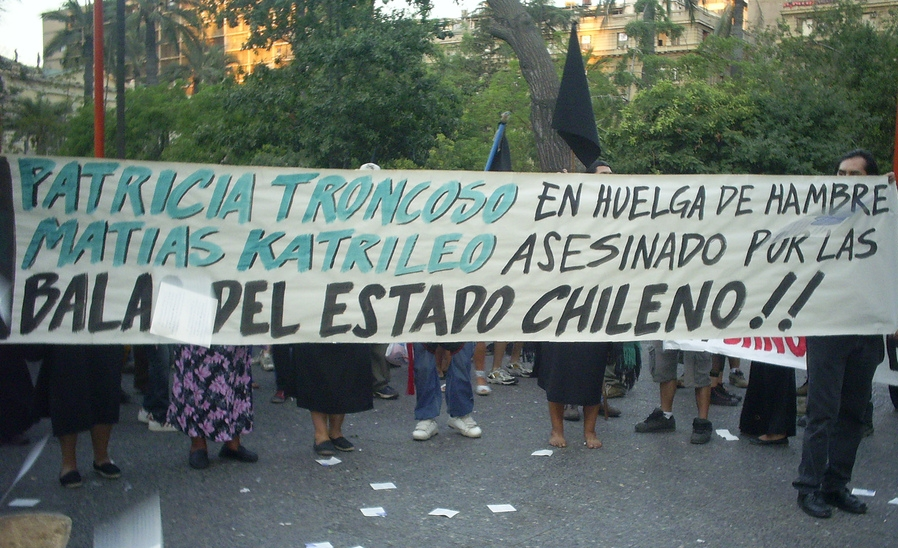
Demonstration in Santiago, after the killing of two Mapuche activists

Numerous incidents such as violent land occupations, burning of private property and demonstrations have occurred in Araucania. In the wake of the deaths of a few of its activists, Mapuche organization Coordinadora Arauco-Malleco played a key role by organizing and supporting violent land occupations and other direct actions, such as the burning of houses and farms, that have ended up in clashes with the police.

The government of Michelle Bachelet said that it was not ready to contemplate expropriating land in the southern region of Araucania to restore lost ancestral territory to the Mapuche. The government set out to buy land for use by 115 Mapuche communities, however, according to government officials, the current owners had nearly tripled the prices they were demanding. On the other hand, the effectiveness of the government policy of buying and distributing land has been questioned. Two special presidential envoys were sent to southern Chile to review the increasingly fractious "Mapuche situation".

=== 2009 attempts at reconciliation: proposed constitutional amendment ===
Correlating to these incidents, in 2009, the Chilean Government (Senate) voted to amend the constitution to include specific rights for indigenous people. The constitutional amendment regarding Mapuche recognition would change the way the country treats violations of indigenous rights. Formal complaints regarding any violations would now pass through the formal court system. There will also be attempts at increasing the reaction time of the state to indigenous rights violations. This is in response to previous violations where permanent damage already occurred before an indigenous person's voice was heard.

The amended constitution would also include a clause stating any project, law, act, etc. that is created without proper consultation of indigenous groups is nullified. The Special Rapporteur's report stated the guidelines for the consultation process. Consultation must occur in the beginning stages of any project, law, or act that is proposed. The act of consultation must meet a good faith principle where the state and indigenous groups look for solutions rather than conflict. Consultation must also be a discourse between the two groups rather than a gathering of information by either side. Finally, the consultation process must define the scope of the project in its entirety. This includes granting access to documents, financials, modifications, etc. to the indigenous groups.

=== 2010 hunger strike ===
Flag of the Mapuche-Tehuelche people created in 1991, a symbol of their claim to some Argentine-Mapuche areas

Between 2010 and 2011, a series of hunger strikes by Mapuche community members imprisoned in Chilean prisons to protest against the conditions in which the proceedings against them took place, mainly due to the application of the antiterrorist law, and for the double prosecutions they were subject to, because parallel proceedings were carried out in the ordinary and military courts.

The strikes began on July 12, 2010, with a group that was in preventive detention, some for more than one year and a half, all accused of violating anti-terrorism legislation.

=== January 2013 events ===
A march was held in commemoration of the death of Matías Catrileo in Santiago in January 2013. During the march a group of masked men threw molotov cocktails at banks. Later the same group caused incidents near Estación Mapocho. The commemoration was associated by newspaper La Tercera with the assault and torching of a truck on Chile Route 5 in the Araucanía Region.

On the morning of January 4, 2013, the agricultural business couple Luchsinger-Mackay were burned alive in a fire in their house in Vilcún, Araucanía Region. The prosecutor said it was arson in a preliminary report while the newspaper La Tercera, linked it to the commemoration of the death of Matías Catrileo and to the truck burning the previous days. A relative of the dead persons claimed there was a campaign to empty the region of farmers and businessmen adding that "the guerrilla is winning" and lamented the "lack of rule of law". A male activist wounded by a bullet was detained by police 600 m from the torched house. A separate thesis claims the house was attacked by at least seven persons and that the "machi" had received the bullet wound from the occupants of the house before dying in the fire.

In September 2017, the prosecutor of La Araucanía, Roberto Garrido, confirmed that there was a connection between members of the Weichán Auka Mapu and the Luchsinger-Mackay case. This was due to ongoing investigations showing the involvement of at least 25 individuals in the attack. The prosecutor confirmed that the investigations were still ongoing.

On April 30, a freight train was derailed near Collipulli to be then assaulted by men with firearms. Interior minister Andrés Chadwick said the Chilean Antiterrorist Law will be applied to those responsible for the attack.

== 2016–2022: Upsurge of the conflict ==
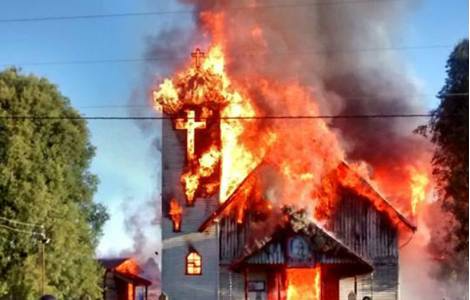
A church is burned in 2016.

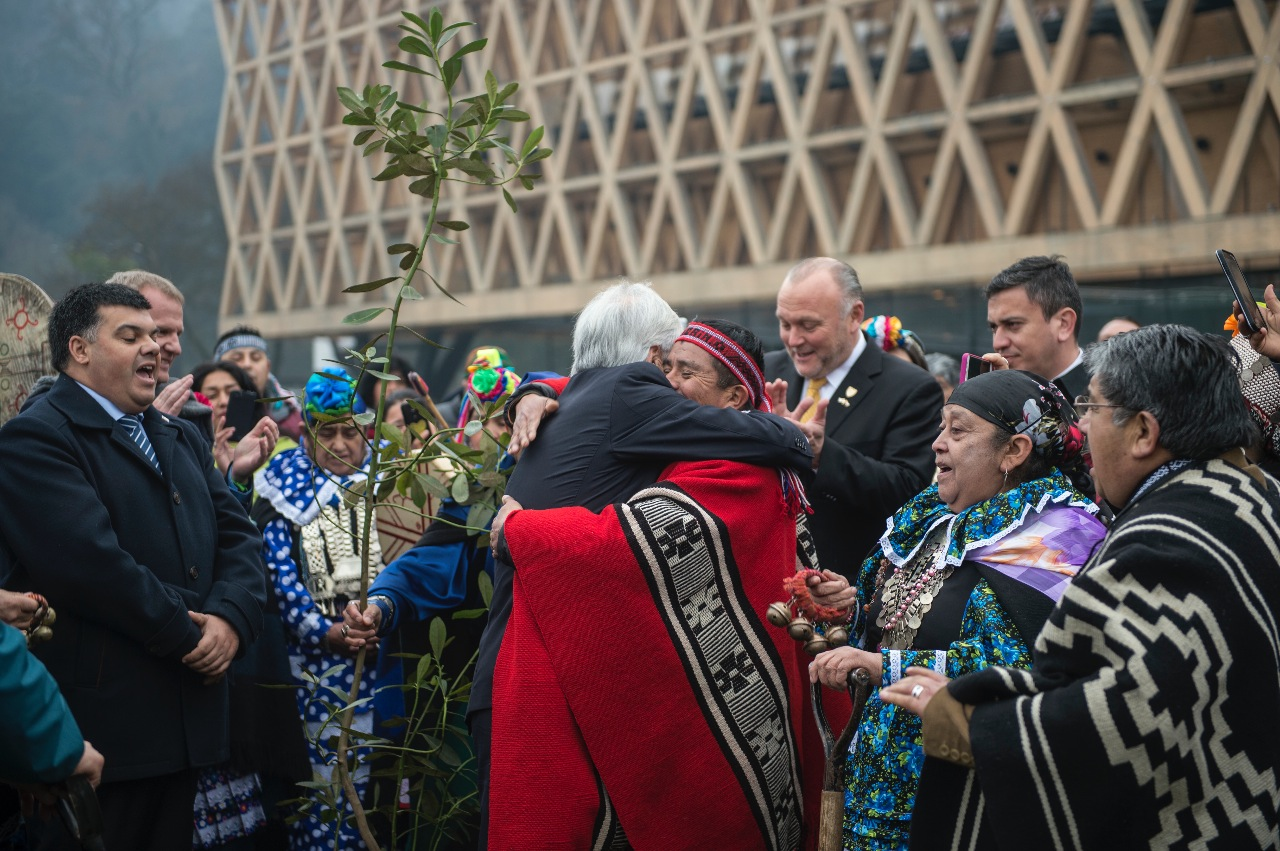
President Piñera participates in a Mapuche religious ceremony.

Since 2016, there has been an increasing number of attacks in the region, especially against churches, machinery, forest industries, and security forces. A June 2018 article in the equaltimes.org website reported that "military police (GOPE) often intervene violently, on the side of the companies, intimidating the Mapuche communities, acting indiscriminately against women or minors." The Jesuit priest Carlos Bresciani, who has spent 15 years heading the Misión Jesuita Mapuche in Tirúa, said that he doesn't see autonomy coming easily, given the disposition of the Chilean Senate, and that the "underlying problem is how communities participate in decision-making in their own territories". Bresciani observed that the violence "reflects that there is an open wound." In January 2018, while saying Mass before thousands at Temuco, "the de facto capital of the Mapuche community", Pope Francis called for an end to the violence, and for solidarity with "those who daily bear the burden of those many injustices". In 2018, Camilo Catrillanca, the grandson of a local Indigenous leader, was shot in the head during a police operation in a rural community near the town of Ercilla. His death triggered nationwide protest leading to seven police officers being convicted in connection with the shooting.

In January 2019 the Anti-Indigenist organization, Association for Peace and Reconciliation in Araucanía, was founded to defend the interest of farmers affected by incidents of violence by armed groups in the area.

On 20 December 2019, the UN urged Switzerland to stop deportation of Mapuche activist Flor Calfunao to Chile because of concern for her human rights, including the risk of torture.

On 16 June 2021, a police officer was wounded during clashes with suspected indigenous militia groups in the Biobío region. In the same region volunteer firefighters were caught in crossfire between police forces and indigenous militiamen while trying to get to the La Pasión farm to put out a fire.

On 6 July 2021, protest erupted during the opening constitutional session, with citizens demanding an amnesty law for supposed political prisoners who had been arrested during the country's political unrest in 2019.

In late July, fighting was reported between state forces and suspected indigenous militias in the Araucanía and Biobío regions. In the Biobío commune of Tirua, armed men ambushed a police unit, injuring two police officers. Finally, in the Araucanía city of Carahue, militiamen exchanged fire with police officers carrying out a protective order outside the building of a logging company. Two police officers and a worker were injured, before the suspects escaped.

In October, Chilean President Sebastián Piñera declared a state of emergency and deployed troops to Biobio and Araucania in response to clashes between security forces and Mapuche groups.

On 25 December 2021, the Mapuche organization Lafkenche Mapuche Resistance claimed responsibility for the following sabotage actions in Wallmapu in support of Mapuche political prisoners and fallen fighters:

- Wednesday 24 November: Burning of four trucks for extracting aggregate material from the Trongol river, and a forestry truck belonging to Bosques Arauco, in the Sector Los Rios, Los Alamos.
- Thursday 9 December: Burning of 15 forestry machines, in the Coihue-Yeneco Estate of Forestal Arauco. Lebu.
- Tuesday 14 December: Burning of 15 forestry machines in the El Tesero Estate of Forestal Arauco. Curanilahue.
- Tuesday 22 December: Burning of 31 summer cabins in the Sector Lincuyin. Contulmo.

=== Visit by Izkia Siches ===
On March 15, 2022, Interior Minister Izkia Siches visited Araucania, an area heavily populated by Mapuche groups. The visit ended when shots were fired and Siches was forced to evacuate. Since the event relations between the state and Mapuche have continued to deteriorate. The election of President Boric was initially promising for the Mapuche as they had made progress after centuries of disputes. Furthermore, the Chilean state recently proposed a new constitution that would greatly increase indigenous rights within Chile. However, many Mapuche members are questioning the state after the recent encounter with Minister Siches. Victor Queipul, a Mapuche leader, commented on Siches' visit: "Minister Siches had no intention of listening to the Mapuche people, her aim was solely to strengthen her ministerial position without tackling Mapuche issues, In that case, we are unwilling to welcome her. If the ministry wants dialogue, they must follow the correct protocols."

The Mapuche also claim they were never consulted about the visit and were alarmed when they saw a military entourage approaching. In response to the shooting, Boric announced a state of emergency in the area of Araucania leading to more military presence. The Mapuche disagreed with the move saying the government violated rules regarding consultation. Furthermore, they increasingly believe Boric's decisions mirror those of previous dictators who sought to topple the Mapuche. Less than a week following the state of an emergency announcement one worker was shot and four others badly injured. Each of the five victims involved were Mapuche peoples, and the attack mirrors those by police officers and security firms against Mapuche activists. The Mapuche groups believe the state of emergency is to serve the special interests of the forestry companies in the area. They believe it offers them personal protection from attacks through state interference. There have also been reports of corruption between local police officers and forestry companies. Officers are alleged to have received payments from forestry companies while still under contract with the Chilean government.

=== Claims of organized crime ===
Groups of Mapuche fighters continued to cause disruption within Chile's wooded area in the months leading to summer. The attacks continue with the same motive of freeing ancestral lands currently held by private enterprises. Left-wing president Boric doesn't see the violent conflict as a means to an end to the tumultuous relationship between the state and Mapuche people. The attacks have also become more targeted going after specific individuals rather than just property or machinery. The motives behind the attacks are also questioned by many in Chile. While the ancestral land claims are proven to be legitimate many believe criminal organizations have taken advantage of the dire scenario. Through the struggle for land organized crime has surfaced and reports of drug trafficking are present. Suspects of potential crime are the seven militant groups that are currently at war with the Chilean state. The state firmly believes at least some groups are using the struggle for land as a facade for their true motives. Furthermore, police reports have claimed they made multiple cocaine busts and uncovered marijuana plants all concealed among the forestry plants in remorse regions. Lumber companies have also been affected by the potential of organized crime. According to the forestry chamber, 4% of the 4,500 logging trucks that transit everyday carry stolen wood. The wood is stolen from the lumber companies, laundered through sawmills, and eventually sold with falsified documents.

In response to the high tensions in the area, President Boric responded: "I have the duty to use all legal tools to guarantee the security of the population, and I will not waver in using them." Boric deployed more troops to the area after arson, shootings, and destruction of property rose from 1,118 in 2019 to 1,771 in 2021. The attacks in 2022 alone have increased by 44 from January to April. The victims of such attacks are commonly, but not exclusively, forestry workers, police officers, and military personnel. Mapuche people have also been caught in the crossfire. Common Mapuche who are targeted are those who work for the forestry companies as they are denounced by more radical Mapuche groups. The feelings among the Mapuche regarding President Boric's decision are quite mixed. Some believe it will offer some safety and security, while others think it mirrors the actions of former dictator Augusto Pinochet. Regardless, many Mapuche believe that the violence is detrimental to their communities and must come to an end. Cristobal Nancufil, a 19-year-old Mapuche member, doesn't believe in the violence: "I don't feel part of this struggle, Ethnic pride is good. But attacking someone's property that long ago belonged to Mapuche, how is this the fault of the descendants?" Poverty in the region is also higher at 17.4% compared to 10.8% for the rest of the nation, further worsening the condition of the region.

On February 5, 2025, the Argentine government led by Javier Milei declared the RAM as a "terrorist organization" after the Governor of Chubut, Ignacio Torres, linked the RAM to the ongoing wildfires in the region—which have already affected more than 20,000 hectares—and accused Jones Huala of instigating them. However, the Mapuche leader denied any involvement of the RAM in the forest fires that have spread across Argentine Patagonia since December, stating: "We have never done it, nor would we ever do it" in response to the accusations.

Federico Astete, leader of the Resistencia Mapuche Lavkenche, has participated in arson attacks in the Biobío Region and in the attack on the Grollmus Mill.

=== New constitution proposal of 2021–2022 ===
The Constitutional Convention made a new constitution proposal in 2021 and 2022 that would have changed the economic and political system of the country. Changes put in place would have created independent judiciary systems for people who identified as indigenous. The proposal of constitution would have mainly hurt the legal rights of mining companies, decentralized the government and shifted more power to rural areas of Chile. The proposal contemplated indigenous representation in Congress with the ability to veto projects, laws, etc. on issues concerning and not concerning them. Essentially, the new constitution would have defined Chile as a "plurinational state" which is several nations in one state. The new constitution was heavily focused on the overrepresentation of indigenous communities. Indigenous communities make up about 12% of the population, according to the 2020 census. The new constitution would have given them greater political representation. Many Mapuche supported the constitutional change and some opposed it. Hugo Antonio Alcamán is an association of Mapuche professionals leader who opposed the constitution proposal: "We were supposed to be fighting privilege, but suddenly we look like the privileged ones." Farmers also feared the idea of a new constitution since it intruded on private property rights. Many believed their property wouldn't be respected and they feared a repeat of state land seizures that happened in the 1970s. The proposed constitution did not pass in the end for a multitude of reasons. One, was the overrepresentation of Mapuche in Congress and the conflict that it could cause. Furthermore, the usage of the word plurinational was also a major concern for the citizens. Many didn't know if plurinational was simply an ideology or if it would bring along legitimate policy change. The word plurinational caused concern for the majority and the constitution was rejected with 62% voting against it.

Another more conservative constitution, that was viewed as harmful to the autonomous Mapuche movement interests, was also rejected in 2023.

== Anti-Terrorism Law ==
The Chilean government's usage of the "Anti-Terrorism Law" in the conflict is a focal point of the controversy surrounding the conflict. In 2013, the United Nations condemned the use of the Anti-Terrorism Law against Mapuche activists. Amnesty International and the Inter-American Court of Human Rights have made similar criticisms.

According to a May 2022 poll by Cadem 76% of Chileans believe there is terrorism in Araucanía Region. This is a rise from the 56% that believed so in 2017. Conversely, Cadem polls show that those who reject the notion that there is terrorism in Araucanía Region decreased from 41% to 19% in the same period.

== See also ==
- Council of All Lands
- Coordinadora Arauco-Malleco
- Association for Peace and Reconciliation in Araucanía
- Indigenous peoples in Chile
- Indigenous peoples in Argentina
- Resistencia Ancestral Mapuche
