= Werkén =

Traditional tribal leader in the Mapuche Culture of Southern South America

A werkén is a traditional tribal leader (but not a chief) in the Mapuche tradition, an Amerindian group indigenous to South America. It is a position that is lower than the lonco or "head" and may be considered the "body". The name werkén means "messenger" in Mapuche.
