= Ralco Hydroelectric Plant =

Coordinates: 38.0457°S 71.4755°W

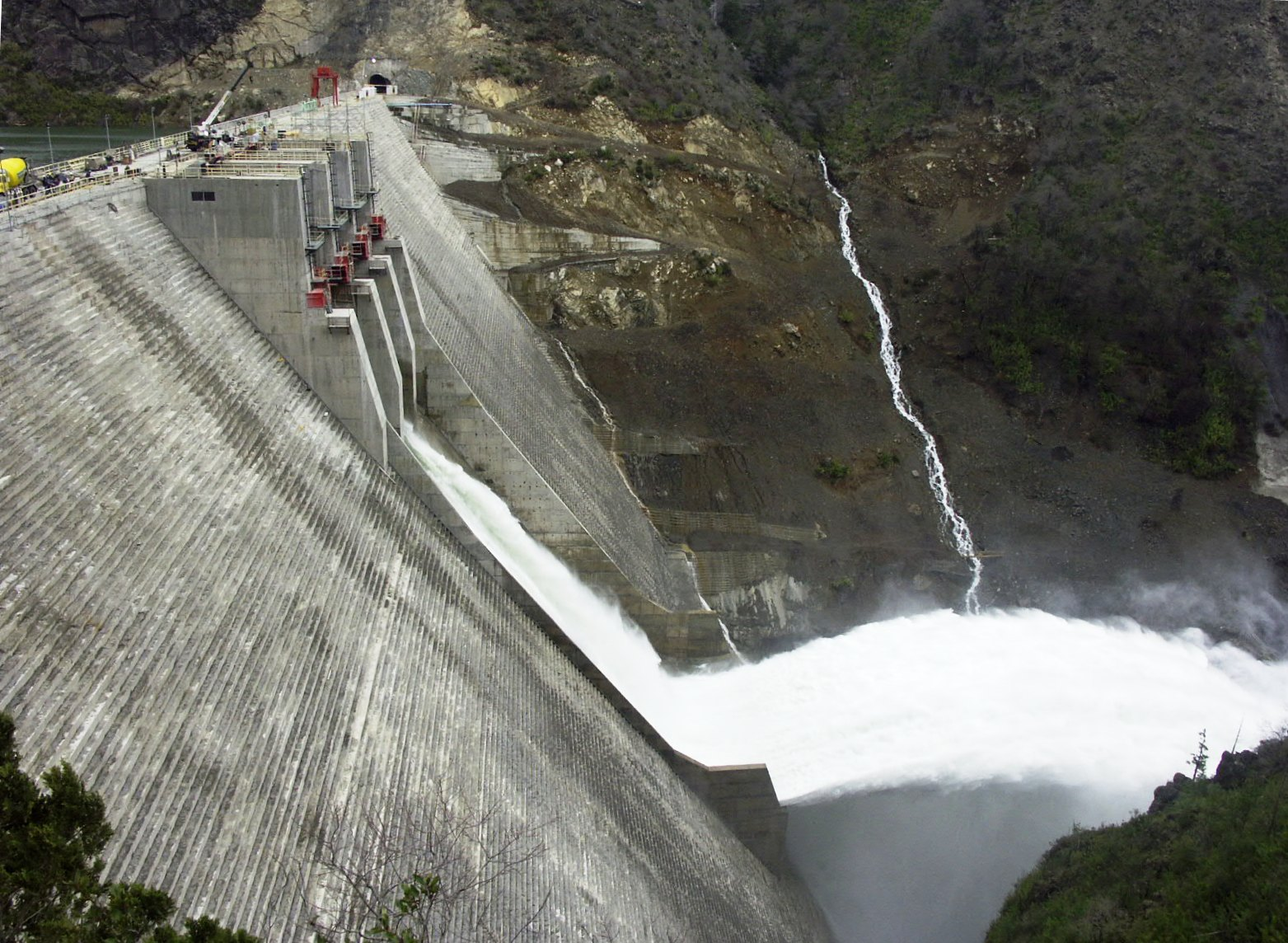
- Interactive map of Ralco Hydroelectric Plant
- Country: Chile
- Status: Operational
- Opening date: 2004

Ralco Hydroelectric Plant is a hydroelectric power station and dam in Bío Bío Region, Chile. The plant uses water from the upper Bío Bío River and produces 690 megawatts (930,000 hp) of electricity. The plant was built by ENDESA in 2004. The project has proven controversial with local indigenous Mapuche since a graveyard had to be flooded by the dam.
