= Wallmapuwen =

Political organization in Chile

- President: Eulojio Ignacio Astete Nahuelcoy
- Founded: April 9, 2005
- Legalised: June 5, 2016
- Dissolved: April 27, 2017; 9 years ago
- Membership (2017): 1084
- Ideology: Indigenismo; Autonomism; Laicism; Sumak kawsay Plurinationalism; Multiculturalism; Interculturalism; Multilingualism; Liberal democracy
- Political position: Left
- National affiliation: Everyone to La Moneda (2013)
- Slogan: Kizungünetuafiyñ Taiñ Wallmapu

Wallmapuwen ("Fellow citizens of the Mapuche country" in English) is a Mapuche political organization trying to establish itself as a political party in the Chilean legal system. Its political ideology is generally based on leftism, democracy, Mapuche nationalism, self-determination and secular government.

The political party was founded in 2006 and advocates for self-governance and autonomy for Mapuche people. In 2016 it was officially recognized by the Electoral Service of Chile.
