= Cattle raiding =

Act of stealing cattle

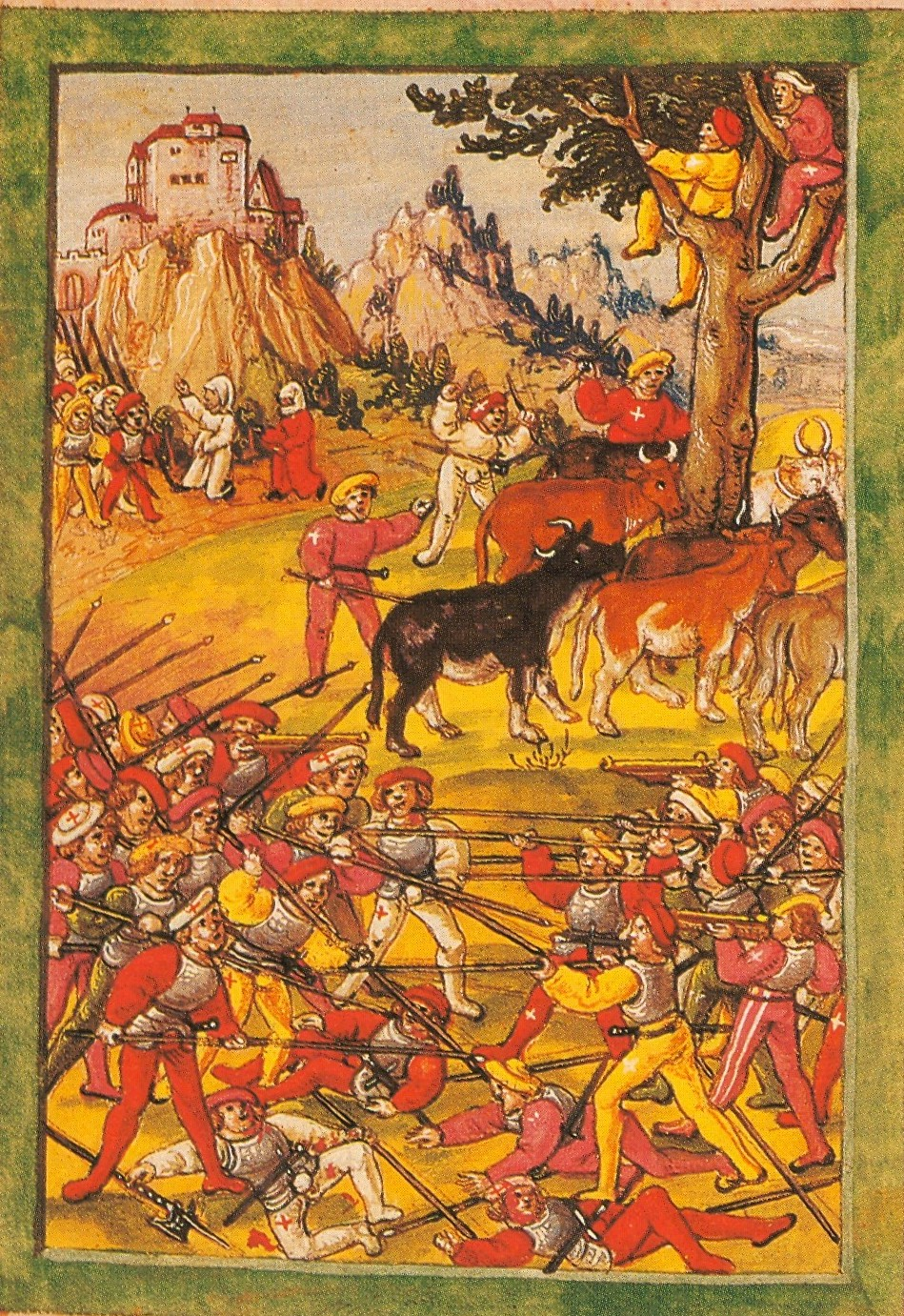
A cattle raid during the Swabian War, 1499

Cattle raiding is the act of stealing live cattle, often several or many at once. In Australia, such stealing is often referred to as duffing and the perpetrator as a duffer. In parts of the country, however, especially in Queensland, the practice is known as poddy-dodging and the perpetrator as a poddy-dodger. In North America, especially in the Western cowboy culture, cattle theft is dubbed rustling and one who engages in it is a rustler.

== Historical cattle raiding ==
The act of cattle-raiding is quite ancient, first attested over seven thousand years ago, and is one of the oldest-known aspects of Proto-Indo-European culture, being seen in inscriptions on artifacts such as the Norse Golden Horns of Gallehus and in works such as the Old Irish Táin Bó Cúailnge ("Cattle Raid of Cooley"), the paṇis of the Rigveda, the Mahabharata cattle raids and cattle rescues.

=== Ancient Egypt ===
Cattle raiding existed in the Nile delta region from the Old Kingdom onwards. Indeed, on a diorite jar, Narmer - considered to be the unifier of Egypt - claimed to have captured thousands of cattle during a war with an opposing northern kingdom. This raiding in the Nile delta continued in later centuries with Libyans raiding the rich, well-watered pastures; the area itself was considered an area of banditry into the Roman period. Pharaohs continued to raid too, the Pharaoh Sneferu took over 200,000 heads of livestock during a raid into Nubia.

=== Cattle raiding in ancient Greek mythology ===
Cattle raiding played a major part in Ancient Greek mythology. Hermes, for example, raided Apollo's cattle when he was newly born. An early story of Oedipus from Hesiod's Works and Days had him die in a cattle raid and not blind without a kingdom like in the plays of Sophocles and Euripides. Heracles raided the cattle of Geryon; which in Plato's Gorgias Callicles used as an example to say the 'might makes right'. In the Odyssey, Odysseus' men chose to ignore a warning not to rob the cattle of the god Helios because of hunger and were cursed to die. Cattle raiding may have been part of initiation rites for ancient Greek youths. These examples point to a culture of cattle raiding in the pre-Classical Hellenic world.

Cattle raiding was a major theme in both the Iliad and the Odyssey. According to Jeremy McInerney, cattle raiding was an essential part of Mycenean and Minoan society represented in its visual culture and records. Cattle were a measure of wealth, glory, and status in these societies; they formed a key part of ritual sacrifice, gift exchange, feasting, and bride price.

=== Central Asia ===
In his childhood, the Turco-Mongol conqueror Timur and a small band of followers raided travelers for goods, especially animals such as sheep, horses, and cattle. Around 1363, it is believed that Timur tried to steal a sheep from a shepherd but was shot by two arrows, one in his right leg and another in his right hand, where he lost two fingers. Both injuries disabled him for life. Timur's injuries have given him the names of Timur the Lame and Tamerlane by Europeans.

=== Ireland and Britain ===
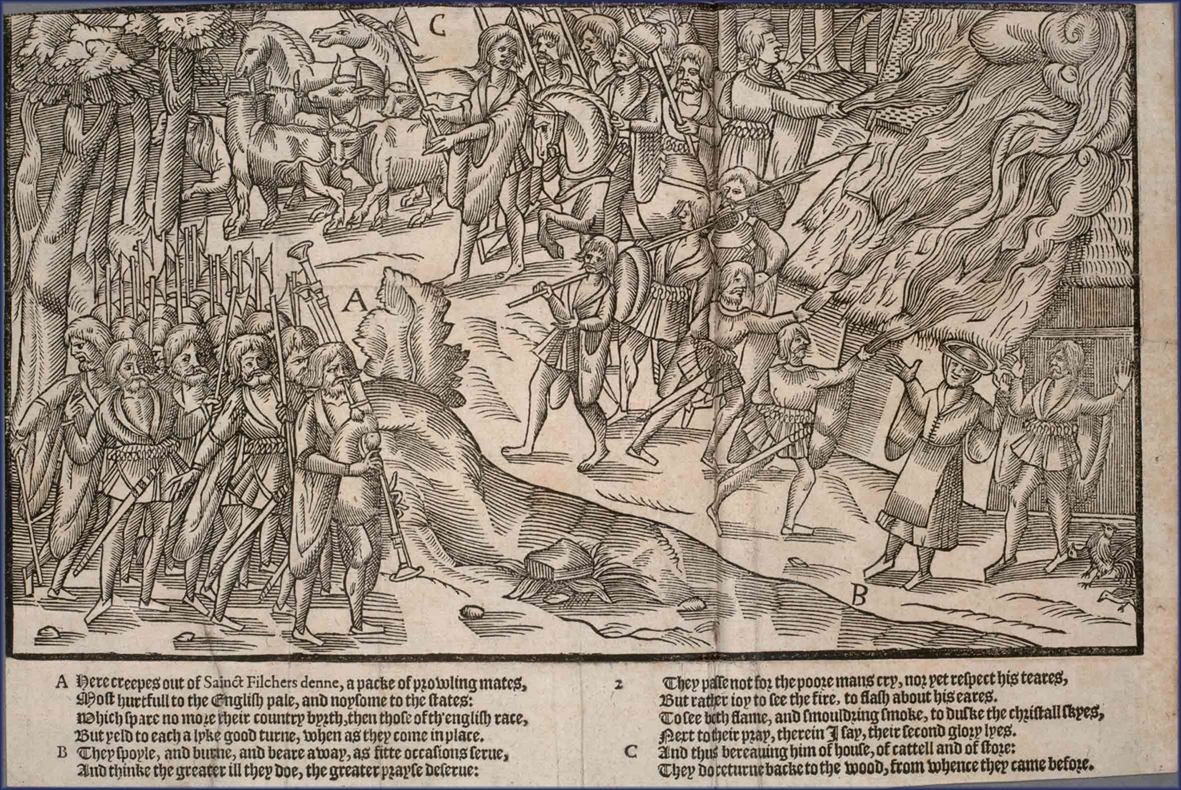
Depiction of cattle raid in Ireland c. 1580 in The Image of Irelande by John Derricke.

In Gaelic Ireland, cattle raiding, whether in retaliation for an insult under the code of conduct or to keep the whole clan fed during a difficult winter, was a common part of warfare between Irish clans, as is often depicted in stories from Irish mythology, such as the Táin Bó Cúailnge and the Táin Bó Flidhais. Cattle raiding and selling protection against theft continued by Irish clan chiefs and rapparees, particularly against the estates of Anglo-Irish landlords, well into the 18th century in Ireland.

Warfare between Scottish clans was often for very similar reasons and, during the 17th and 18th centuries, many Scottish clan chiefs would similarly operate an extralegal Watch over the cattle herds of the Lowland gentry in return for protection money, which Highland Chiefs similarly used to feed their tenants and clansmen. Any cattle that were stolen from herds under the Chiefs' Watch were either retrieved, or he paid for them in full.

Cattle-raiding by the Border reivers was a serious problem for many centuries on both sides of the Anglo-Scottish border.

=== American Old West ===
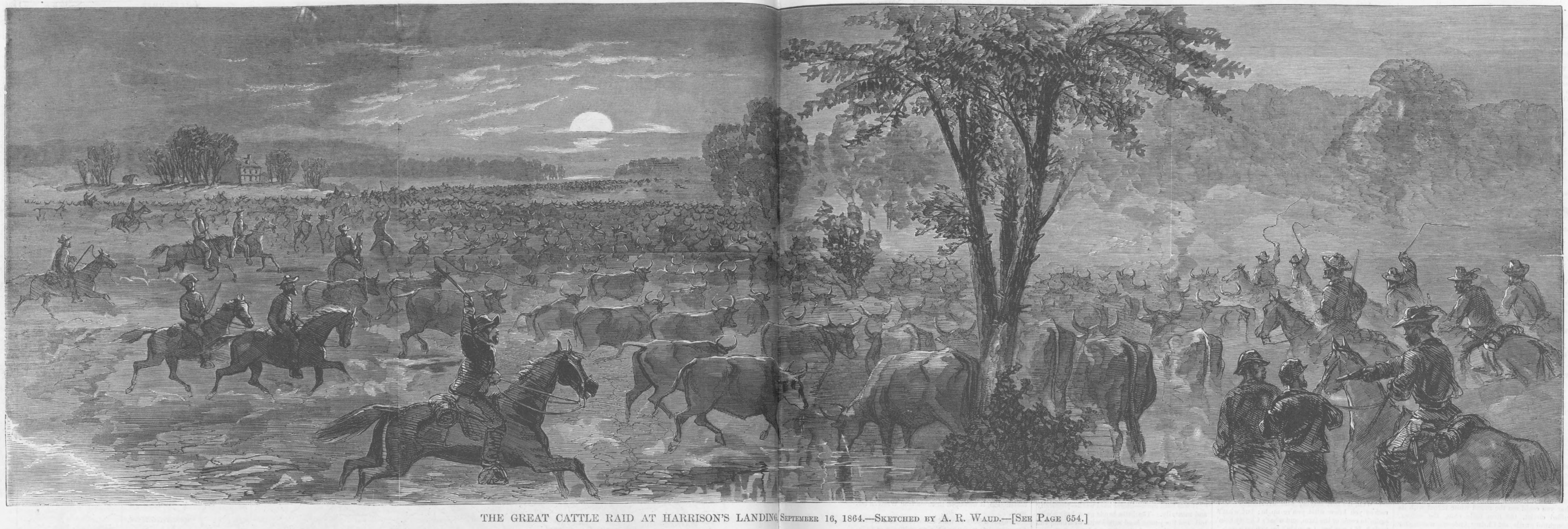
The Beefsteak Raid (1864) during the American Civil War.

In the American frontier, rustling was considered a serious offense and in some cases resulted in vigilantes hanging or shooting the thieves.

Mexican rustlers were a major issue during the American Civil War (1861–1865); the Mexican government was accused of supporting the habit. American rustlers also stole Mexican cattle from across the border. Failure to brand new calves facilitated theft.

Conflict over alleged rustling was a major issue in the Johnson County War of 1892 in Wyoming.

The transition from open range to fenced grazing gradually reduced the practice of rustling in North America. In the 20th century, so called "suburban rustling" became more common, with rustlers anesthetizing cattle and taking them directly to auction. This often takes place at night, posing problems for law enforcement, because on very large ranches it can take several days for the loss of cattle to be noticed and reported. Convictions are extremely rare.

=== Chile and Argentina ===
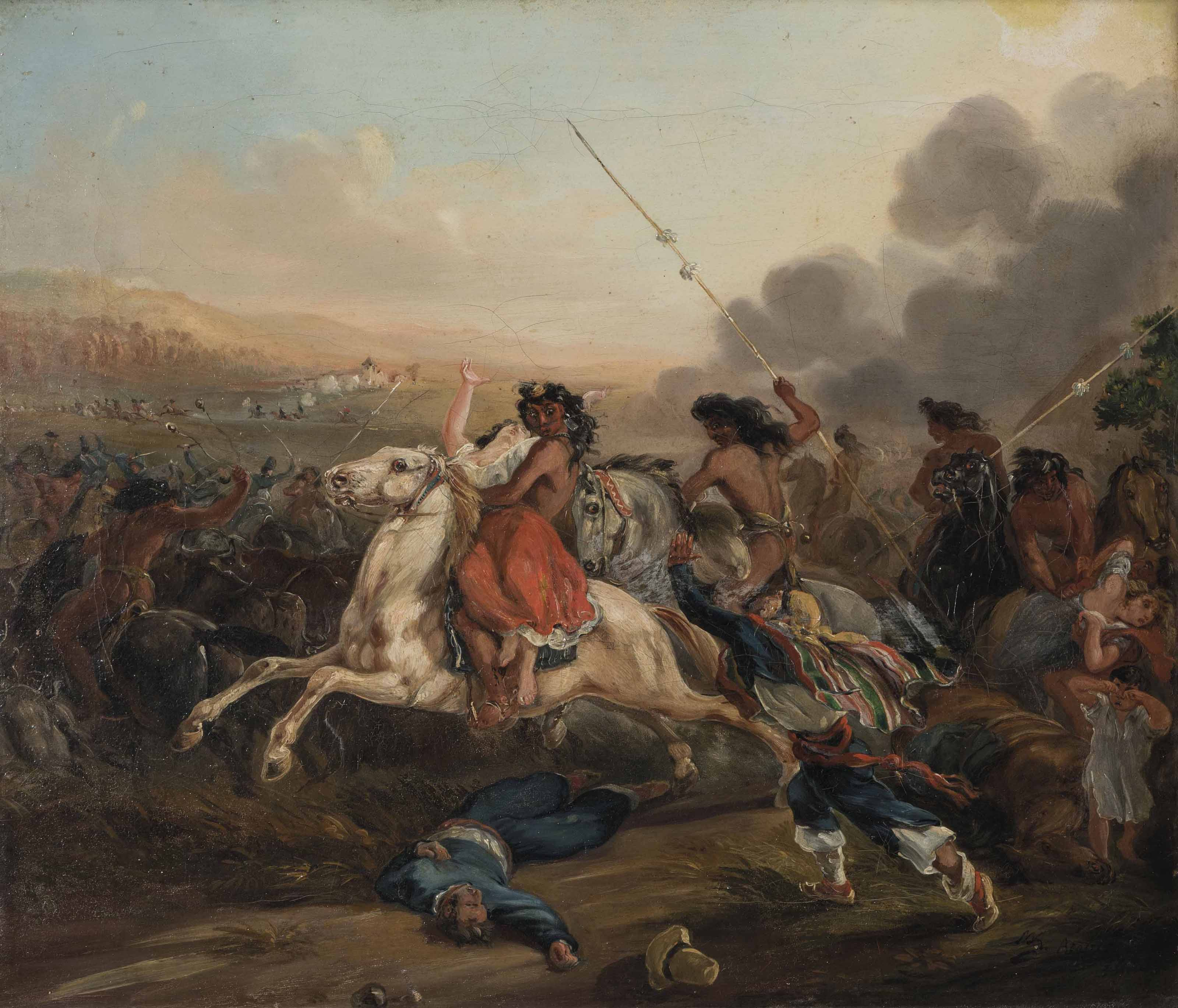
El Malón, Johann Moritz Rugendas (1802–1858)

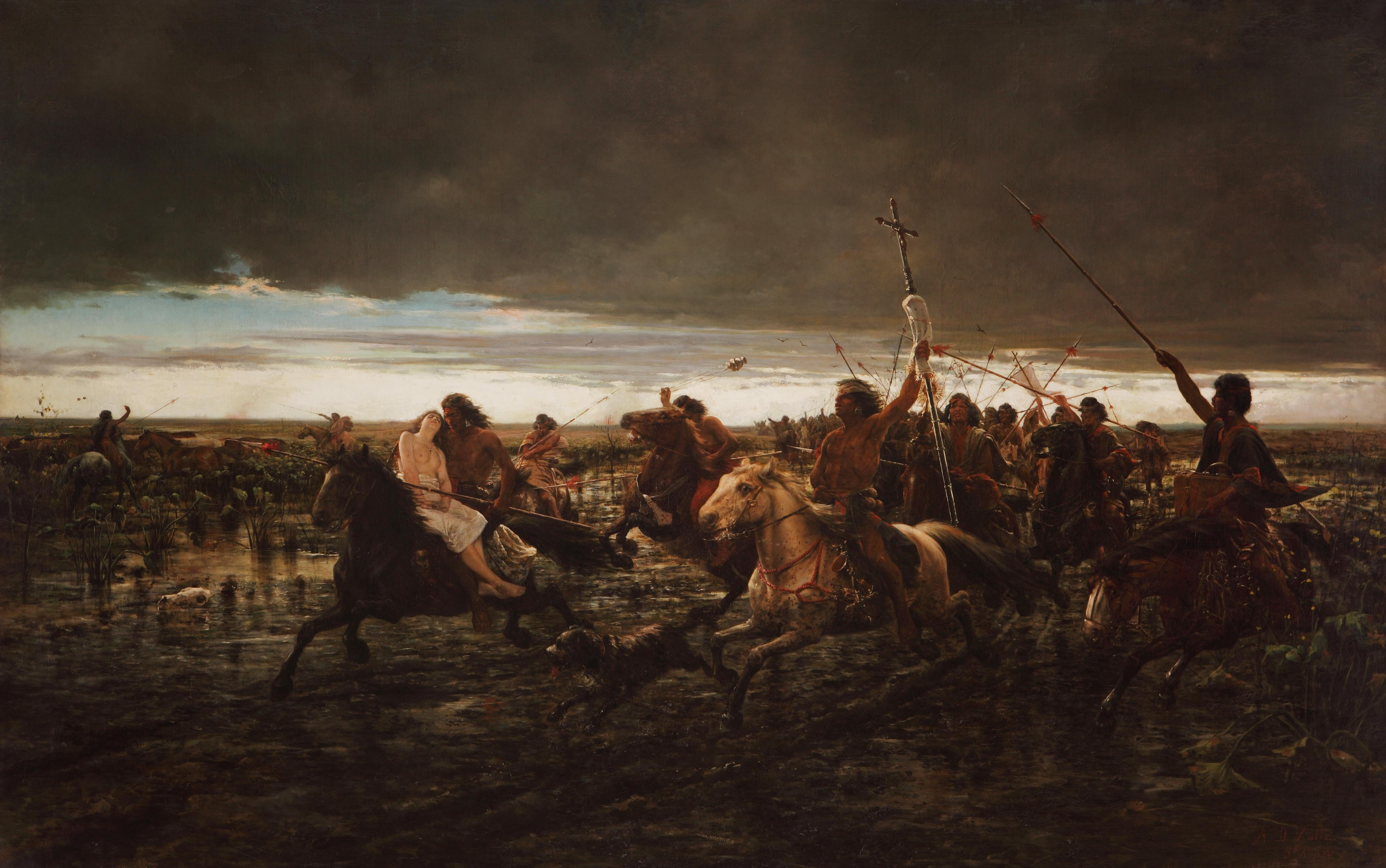
La vuelta del malón (The Return of the Raiders) by Ángel Della Valle (1892).

Cattle raiding became a major issue at the end of the 19th century in Argentina, where cattle stolen during malones were taken through Camino de los chilenos across the Andes to Chile, where they were exchanged for alcoholic beverages and firearms. Several indigenous groups and outlaws, such as the Boroano and Ranquel peoples, and the Pincheira brothers, ravaged the southern frontier of Argentina in search of cattle. To prevent the cattle raiding, the Argentine government built a system of trenches called Zanja de Alsina in the 1870s. Most cattle raids ended after the military campaigns of the Conquest of the Desert in the 1870s, and the following partition of Patagonia established by the Boundary Treaty of 1881 between Chile and Argentina.

In a letter to Chilean President Manuel Montt Mapuche chief Mañil denounced the plunder of graves in search of Mapuche silver, arson of Mapuche houses and other abuses against Mapuches that were happening in the newly created province. Mañil further accused intendant Villalón con Salbo of becoming rich by cattle theft.

The return of Chilean veterans from the War of the Pacific coincided with the Chilean Army's crushing of Mapuche resistance in the Occupation of Araucanía (1861–1883). This led to opportunities for bandits and veterans-turned-bandits to immigrate to the newly opened Araucanía territory, leading to sudden rise in violence and in a region that was recovering from Chilean-Mapuche warfare. Bandits that immigrated to Araucanía allied with displaced Mapuche and made cattle theft their chief business. Stolen cattle was sold in marketplaces through the region.

=== Southern Africa ===
In southern Africa, cattle were an essential part of the economies of its agropastoral societies, including Nguni and Sotho-Tswana speaking peoples. Cattle served as a store of wealth and were exchanged through dowries, tribal tributes, indemnities, and political alliances. Chiefs accumulated cattle through tributes, fines, forfeits, and raids, and redistributed them through loans for regular members to tend to, in exchange receiving some of the milk. Cattle raids were regularly conducted during warfare.

Raiding intensified during early nineteenth century amid environmental stress, changing trade networks, European settler encroachment, and state formation in a period known as the Mfecane or Difaqane, as smaller chiefdoms were incorporated into larger polities. Captured cattle helped chiefs supply followers and reward military service, centralizing their power, while the loss of herds made smaller tribes dependent on more powerful chiefs.

Mzilikazi, the founder of the Ndebele nation, raided widely on the highveld, incorporating some conquered Sotho-Tswana groups while displacing others. Moshoeshoe, the founder of the Basotho nation, raided nearby Thembu and Xhosa groups for cattle, and loaned them among his followers to consolidate his power.

== Contemporary cattle raiding (1990–present) ==
=== East Africa ===
The Turkana, Pokot, Tugen, Keiyo, Marakwet, and Samburu Nilotic populations in northwestern Kenya often raid each other for cattle. Violent cattle rustling has caused massive loss of lives such as the Monday 12 March 2001 raid among the Marakwet in Murkutwo Location, Elgeyo Marakwet County, suspected to have been caused by the Pokot.

=== South Sudan ===
Conflict over pastures and cattle raids has been happening between Dinka and Nuer as they battle for grazing their animals.

Cattle rustling is a major problem in rural areas of South Sudan. In the state of Jonglei, cattle raids in August 2011 left around 600 people dead. Once again in January 2012, ethnic clashes related to cattle theft killed between 2,000 and 3,000 people and displaced as many as 34,500 in the area around Pibor.

=== West Africa ===
Cattle rustling is common in Nigeria.

== See also ==
- Beefsteak Raid
- Border Reivers
- Captain Starlight
- Cattle raiding in Kenya
- Count Redmond O'Hanlon
- Horse theft
- Jack Sully
- Nomadic conflict
- Ritual warfare
- Rob Roy MacGregor
- Slave raiding
- Sudanese nomadic conflicts
- Alameda Slim
