= Araucanization of Patagonia =

Expansion of Mapuche culture and language in South America

The Araucanization of Patagonia (Spanish: Araucanización de la Patagonia) was the process of the expansion of Mapuche culture, influence, and its Mapudungun language from Araucanía across the Andes into the plains of Patagonia. Historians disagree over the time period during which the expansion took place, but estimate it occurred roughly between 1550 and 1850.

== Background ==
Amerindian peoples of the pampas, such as the Puelche, Pehuenche, and Tehuelche, have been forced by the Mapuches to adopt the Mapudungun language as their main language (both of their names are in Mapudungun). Together with Quechua, Aymara, Guarani, and Nahuatl, Mapudungun was among the few Amerindian languages that expanded in use on the continents after the beginning of European colonization. This area of Patagonia was generally isolated from European settlement until late in the 19th century.

== Migration and Argentine response ==
The Mapuche who migrated to Patagonia lived often as nomads. As European settlers established frontier settlements, the Mapuche raided them for cattle or looted their produce. They drove off the cattle stolen in the incursions (malones) and took them to Chile through the mountain passes to trade for goods, especially alcoholic beverages. The main trail for this trade was called Camino de los chilenos and ran a length of about 1,000 kilometres (600 mi) from Buenos Aires Province to the mountain passes of Neuquén Province.

The lonco Calfucurá crossed the Andes from Chile to the Pampas around 1830 to aid the indigenous people, after Juan Manuel de Rosas, the governor of Buenos Aires, started to fight the Boreanos tribe. However, other sources directly contradict this statement, saying that de Rosas contacted the leader in Chile for help fighting against the Boreanos tribe. In 1859, Calfucurá attacked Bahía Blanca in Argentina with 3,000 warriors. Many other bands of Mapuche also became involved in the internal conflicts of Argentina until the Conquest of the Desert. In the 1870s, to counter the cattle raids (and the native peoples on horseback), Argentina constructed a deep trench, called Zanja de Alsina, to prevent cattle from being driven west and establish a boundary to the raiding tribes in the pampas.

Argentine authorities were worried that strong connections between the Araucanized tribes and Chile would give Chile influence over the pampas. Both Argentina and Chile claimed Patagonia. The Argentine government feared that in case of war, the natives would side with the Chileans, who would be able to carry the war all the way to the vicinity of Buenos Aires.

== Conquest of the Desert ==
In 1872, Calfucurá and his 6,000 followers went across the pampas to attack the cities of General Alvear, Veinticinco de Mayo and Nueve de Julio, resulting in the deaths of 300 settlers and the loss of 200,000 head of cattle, which the Mapuche drove back to Chile. After this, Argentina organized its forces to launch what it called the Conquest of the Desert and attacked indigenous people for years. It is estimated that more than 5000 native peoples were killed or captured in that major assault, which was facilitated by the new Remington rifle arming the 6,000 Argentine soldiers (as stated by Gen. Ignacio Fotheringham) [Bodley p. 63, 72]. However, the losses to the Army were minimal, with only 13 soldiers killed; the lop-sided victory was taken as proof of European superiority and celebrated in art. Until December 2012, the 100 peso bill of Argentina had a picture honoring the Conquest of the Desert on one side.

== See also ==
- Araucanía
- Conquest of the Desert
- Kingdom of Araucania and Patagonia
- List of Mapudungun placenames
- Occupation of Araucanía
- War of Arauco
