= Boundary Treaty of 1881 between Chile and Argentina =

Territorial settlement

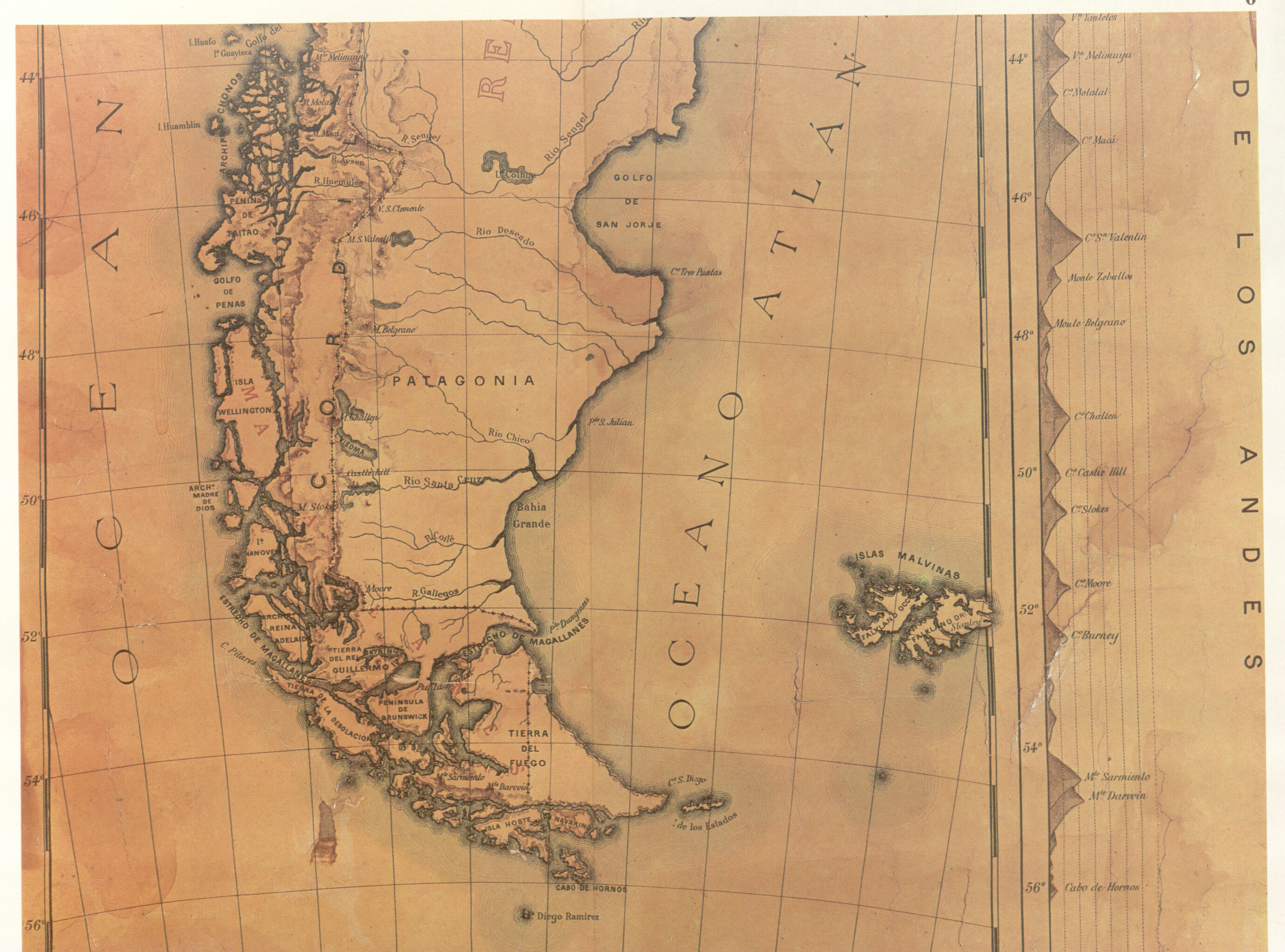
- A map from 1884.
- Type: Bilateral treaty
- Signed: 23 July 1881
- Location: Buenos Aires, Argentina
- Original signatories: Argentina; Chile

French map of 1862 shows Patagonia as Terra Nullius ("réclamée par la république Argentine") and Tierra del Fuego with the same color as the Falkland Islands. This map does not reflect actual de facto borders of Chile and Argentina.

The Boundary Treaty of 1881 (Spanish: Tratado de Límites de 1881) between Argentina and Chile was signed on 23 July 1881 in Buenos Aires by Bernardo de Irigoyen, for Argentina, and Francisco de Borja Echeverría, for Chile, with the aim of establishing a precise border between the two countries based on the uti possidetis juris principle. Despite dividing largely unexplored lands, the treaty laid the groundwork for nearly all of Chile's and Argentina's 5600 km current border.

== Background ==
Map of the East Patagonia, Tierra del Fuego and Strait of Magellan dispute. In blue and green are the boundaries claimed by Argentinian and Chilean historians respectably as uti possidetis iuris in Patagonia.

Argentina declared its independence from Spain in 1816 and Chile did so in 1818. Once the Spaniards had been expelled, relations between the two nations soured primarily due to a border dispute: both claimed to have inherited overlapping parts of Patagonia.

The Chilean constitution of 1833 established the Andes as its eastern boundary. That was challenged in 1853 by Miguel Luis Amunategui's book Titles of the Republic of Chile to Sovereignty and Dominion of the Extreme South of the American Continent in which he put forward that Chile had valid arguments to claim all of Patagonia. This started an academic debate with Argentine counterparts. These claims traced Chilean claims back to the conquest of Chile in the 16th century by Pedro de Valdivia, arguing that Pedro de Valdivia obtained rights from the Spanish crown to establish a captaincy limited by the Strait of Magellan to the south. Pedro de Valdivia subsequently founded several cities through southern Chile with the goal of reaching the Strait of Magellan. However, the remoteness of the region and the Mapuche in the War of Arauco limited further expansion to the south.

=== Chilean takeover of the Strait of Magellan ===
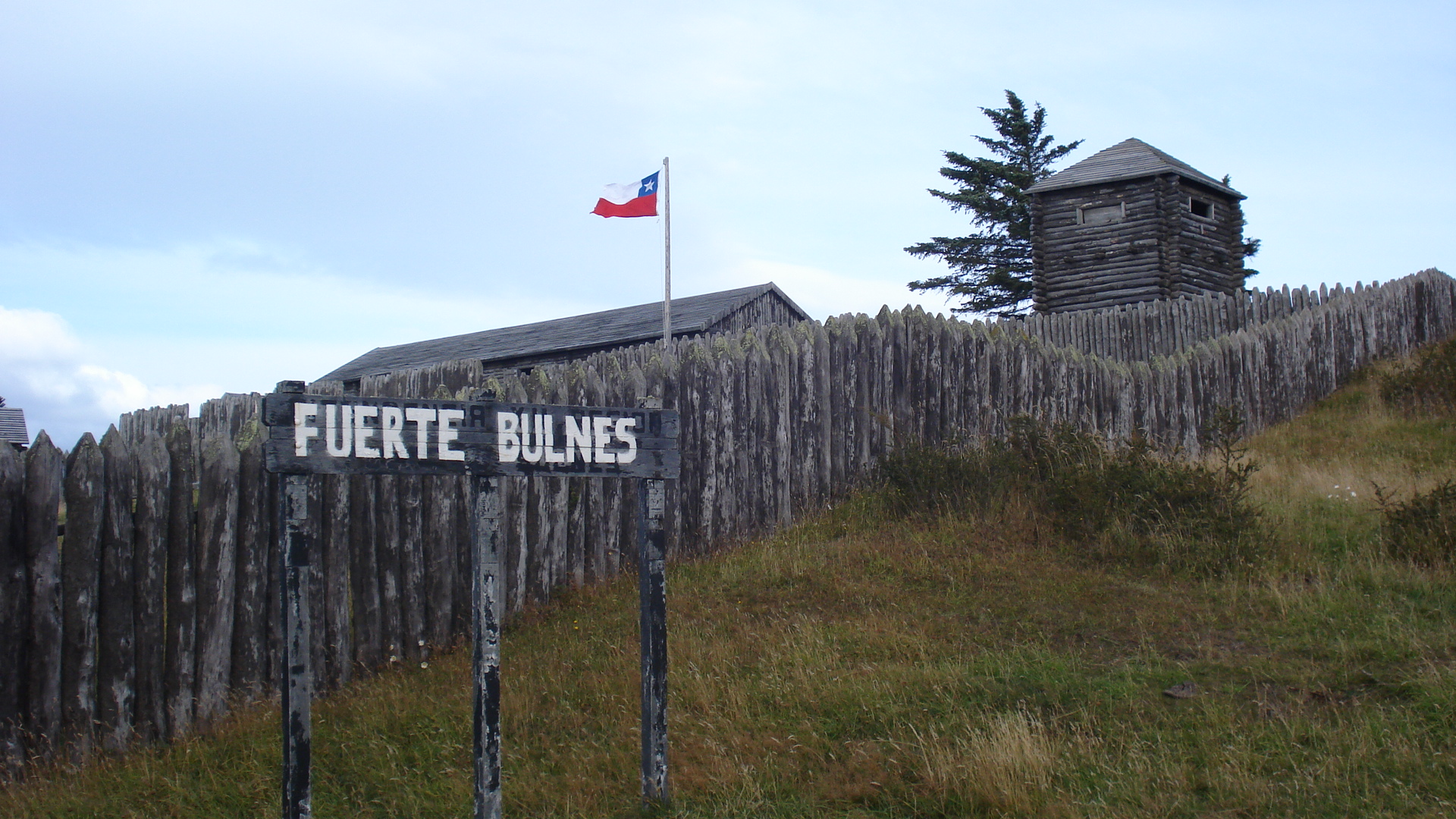
Fuerte Bulnes

The Republic of Chile founded Fuerte Bulnes in 1843, and later moved that settlement to the site of Punta Arenas in 1847, giving a strong impulse to steam navigation through the Strait of Magellan and probably averted the occupation of the strategically crucial strait by the European powers or the United States. As stated in a book about the Strait of Magellan:

An 1837 French expedition of Dumont D'Urville surveyed navigational conditions in the Strait of Magellan and recommended that a French colony be established at the strait to support future traffic along the route.

=== Treaty of 1856 ===
The Treaty of Peace, Friendship, Commerce and Navigation of 1856 between Chile and Argentina (Spanish: Tratado de paz, amistad, comercio y navegación entre la República de Chile y la Confederación Argentina) was the first boundary treaty between Argentina and Chile. Article 39 of the treaty proposed the use of direct diplomatic negotiations and arbitration to resolve disputes. It established that the boundaries should be based on the uti possidetis principle based on what each country possessed before the Chilean and Argentine wars of independence beginning in 1810. It also postponed the solution of the East Patagonia, Tierra del Fuego and Strait of Magellan Dispute into the future. Article 40 of this treaty established a 12-year limit on the effect of its articles about commerce and navigation. The Boundary treaty of 1881 between Chile and Argentina mentions this treaty to say that the later treaty is "in fulfillment" of Section 39 of this treaty.

The 1855/1856 treaty's Article 40 established a 12-year sunset for its commerce and navigation articles.

== Interests of Chile, Argentina, and the great powers ==
=== Chile ===
Chilean trade and culture were oriented towards Europe and therefore the complete control of the strait was a core Chilean interest. In contrast the rest of Patagonia was seen by influential Chilean politicians as a worthless desert. This view was shared by Diego Barros Arana and was inspired by Charles Darwin's description of the area as a useless moorland.

The possession of the Straits of Magellan in all its length is of such great importance for Chile, that in that possession she sees linked not only her progress and development, but also her very existence as an independent nation. – Adolfo Ibáñez

=== Argentina ===
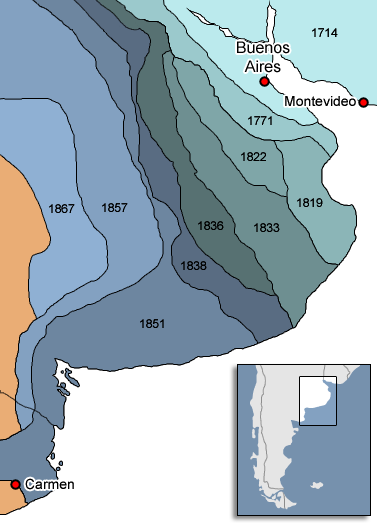
Map of the advance of the Argentina frontier until the establishment of zanja de Alsina

Mapuches and araucanized Indians had for a long time ranged the Argentine southern frontier in search for cattle that were later taken to Chile through the Camino de los chilenos. The cattle were sometimes traded in Chile for weapons and alcoholic beverages. These tribes had strong connections with Chile and therefore gave Chile influence over the pampas. Argentine authorities feared an eventual war with Chile over the region where the natives would side with the Chileans, and that the war would be therefore fought in the vicinities of Buenos Aires.

In the 1870s, Argentina built a more than 500-km long trench called Zanja de Alsina, which Argentina had undertaken during the Conquest of the Desert from 1876 to 1878 to defeat the araucanized Indians occupying northern Patagonia and which aspired to control the eastern third or, at a minimum, the eastern mouth of the strait.

=== Other countries ===
The United Kingdom and the United States did not directly intervene in the distribution of land and maritime areas, but the U.S. ambassadors in Santiago de Chile and Buenos Aires, Thomas A. Osborn and Thomas O. Osborn, did serve as mediators. The concern of the great powers was free navigation through the strait. The U.S. administration declared immediately before the negotiations leading to the treaty:

The Government of the United States will not tolerate exclusive claims by any nation whatsoever to the Straits of Magellan, and will hold responsible any Government that undertakes, no matter on what pretext, to lay or impost or check on United States commerce through the Straits.

Prior to the U.S. statement, in 1873, via a diplomatic letter to major shipping nations, Chile had already promised freedom of navigation through and neutralization in the strait.

The colonial powers, United Kingdom and France, viewed Patagonia and Tierra del Fuego as Terra nullius. Jules Verne described in The Survivors of the "Jonathan" his view of Tierra del Fuego:

The separated geographic location had as consequence that this part of the new world had not been incorporated to any civilized state up to the year 1881 even not by its nearest neighbour Chile and the Republic of Argentina, which were still disputing the pampas of Patagonia. The Magalhães archipelago belonged to nobody ...

Regarding the position of the USA towards the region, on 28 December 1831, the US Navy Captain Silas Duncan with the USS Lexington destroyed the Port Louis, Falkland Islands settlement in response to Argentine activities. The captain declared the islands to be free of government. The United Kingdom established effective control over the Falklands in 1833.

== Negotiation and agreement ==
In 1874 Chilean minister Guillermo Blest Gana and the Argentine Minister of Foreign Relations Carlos Tejedor agreed to put the question to arbitration. However, the new Argentine president Nicolás Avellaneda, boosted by internal popularity, cancelled the agreement in 1875. Attempts to clear up the dispute about Patagonia were unsuccessful until 1881, when Chile was fighting the War of the Pacific against both Bolivia and Peru. Chile had already defeated Bolivia's and Peru's regular armies and had large contingents in occupying Peru and fighting Andrés Avelino Cáceres' guerrillas. To avoid fighting Argentina as well, Chilean President Aníbal Pinto authorized his envoy, Diego Barros Arana, to hand over as much territory as was needed to avoid Argentina siding with Bolivia and Peru.

Yet the Chilean situation was not all that fragile. While Argentina had taken advantage of Chile's conflict to push for a favorable boundary in Patagonia, Chilean diplomacy only agreed to sign the treaty after the triumph at Lima showed Chile to be in a position of power. Thus, the Argentine plans to negotiate with a weakened and troubled Chile were partly forgone with Chile's display of military prowess in Peru.

== Treaty ==
The treaty defined the border in three articles.

It defined the border down to latitude 52°S as the line marked by the continental divide and the highest mountains of the Andes.

Article 1:
The boundary between Chile and the Argentine Republic is from north to south, as far as the 52nd parallel of latitude, the Cordillera de los Andes. The boundary-line shall run in that extent over the highest summits of the said Cordilleras which divide the waters, and shall pass between the sources (of streams) flowing down to either side.

Articles 2 and 3 recognise the area around the Strait of Magellan (South of the 52°S) as Chilean as well as the islands south of Beagle Channel. Isla Grande de Tierra del Fuego was divided in two parts.

Article 2: In the area of the Strait of Magellan, south of the parallel 52°S, the limit would go from Punta Dúngenes westward by the chain of hills to Monte Aymond from where a straight line is drawn to the intersection of parallel 52°S and meridian 70°W, and from there west along the 52° parallel until the last watershed divide point defined by article 1.

Article 3:
In Tierra del Fuego a line shall be drawn, which starting from the point called Cape Espíritu Santo, in parallel 52°40', shall be prolonged to the south along the meridian 68°34' west of Greenwich until it touches Beagle Channel. Tierra del Fuego, divided in this manner, shall be Chilean on the western side and Argentine on the eastern. As for the islands, to the Argentine Republic shall belong Staten Island, the small islands next to it, and the other islands there may be on the Atlantic to the east of Tierra del Fuego and of the eastern coast of Patagonia; and to Chile shall belong all the islands to the south of Beagle Channel up to Cape Horn, and those there may be to the west of Tierra del Fuego.

Furthermore, the treaty defines the status of the Strait of Magellan:

Article 5
The Straits of Magellan shall be neutralized for ever, and free navigation assured to the flags of all nations. In order to assure this freedom and neutrality, no fortifications or military defences shall be constructed on the coasts that might be contrary to this purpose.

Article 6 states that older boundary treaties became obsolete and both countries agreed to submit any future disputes to the decision of a friendly third country.

=== Maritime border ===
The law of the sea at the time of the 1881 treaty was different from the articles of the 1982 Law of the Sea, which meant that Chile and Argentina adhered to the accepted practice of a three-nautical-mile (5.6 km) territorial sea. Therefore, the treaty emphasized the delineation of land boundaries including islands but did not stipulate the offshore limits, which have since been expanded to 200 nautical miles (370 km).

== Further disputes ==
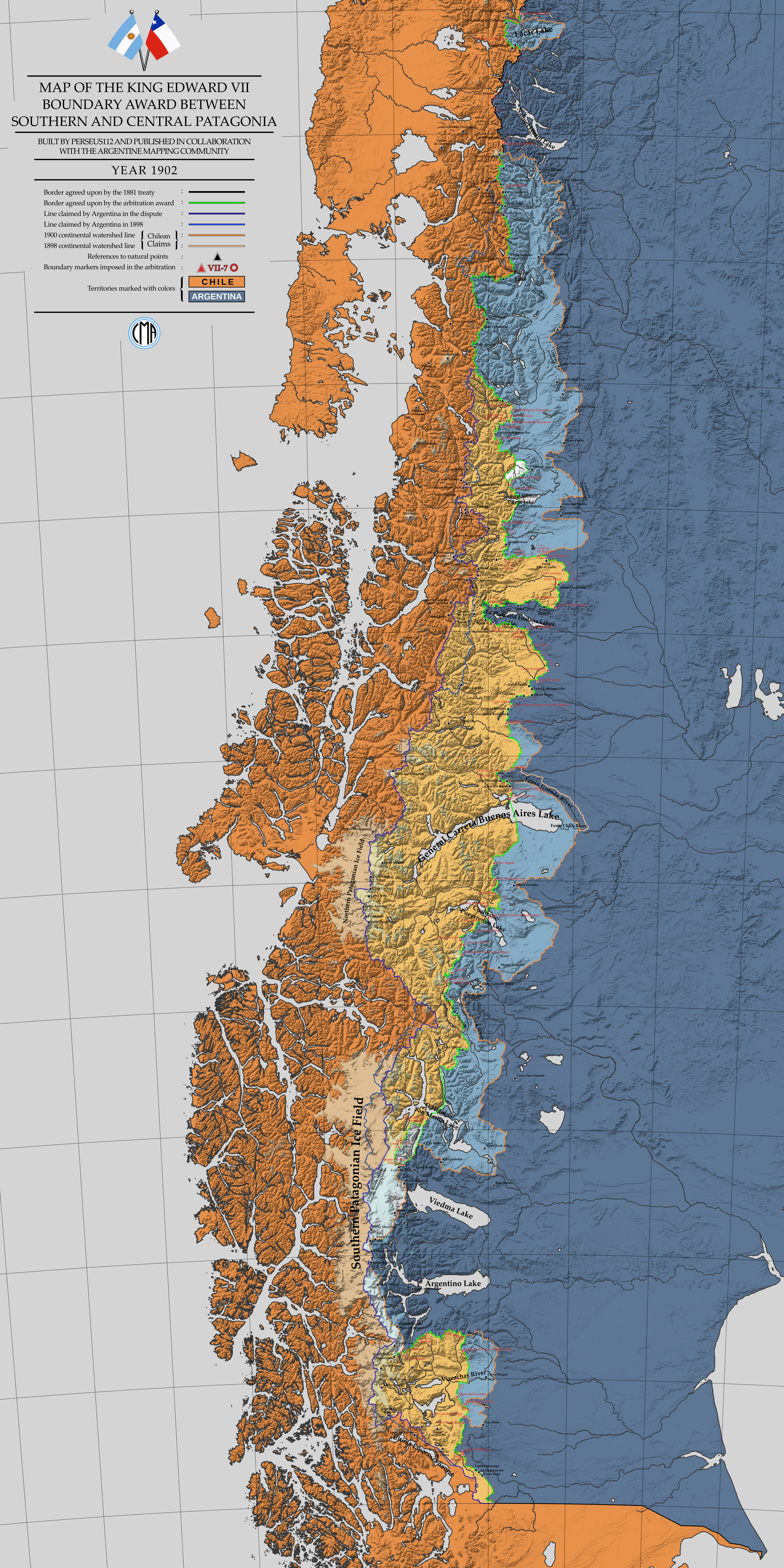
The 1902 Arbitral award of the Andes between Argentina and Chile

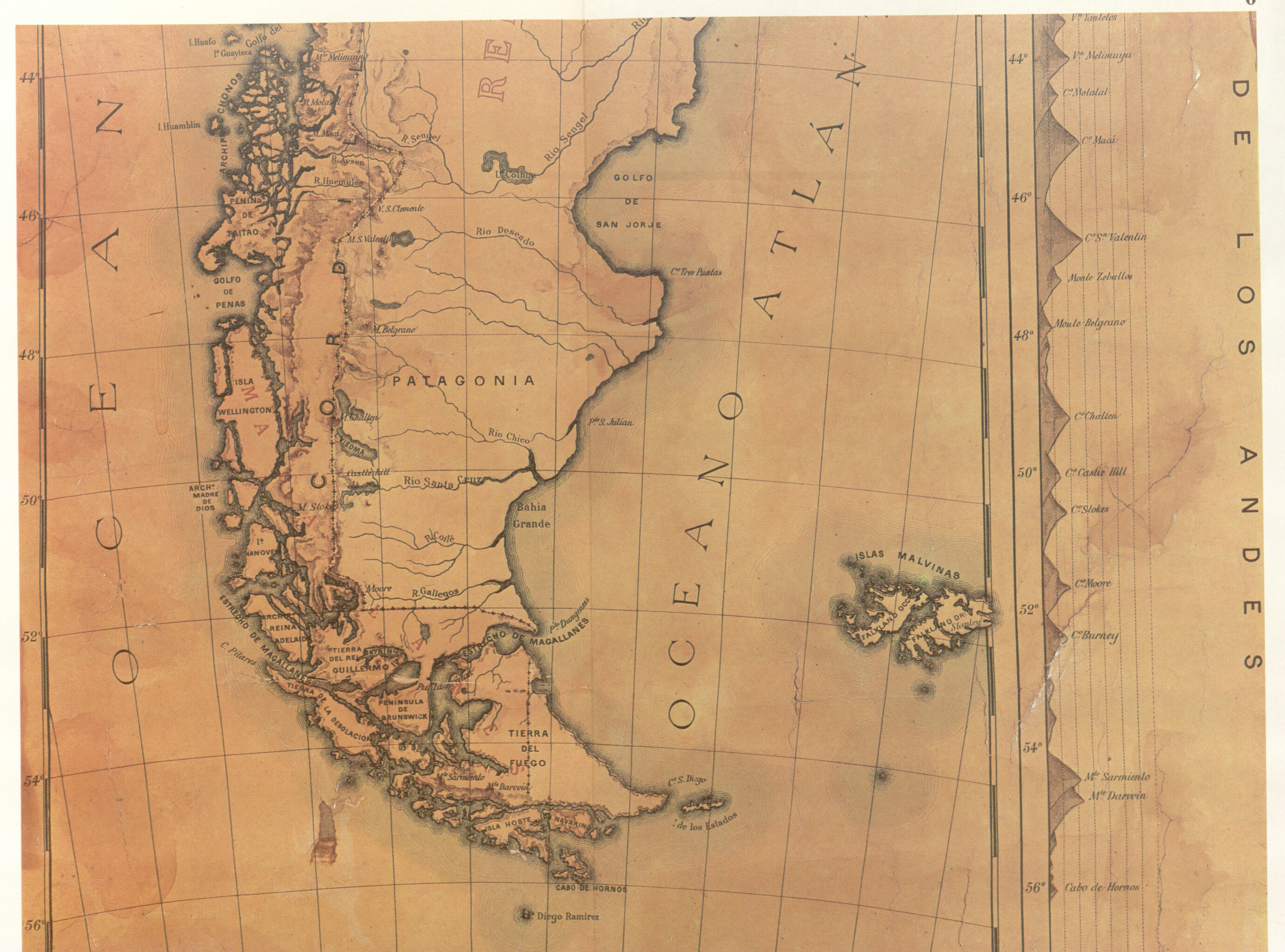
A map from 1884

According to the Argentine view of the treaty, called the Magellan/Atlantic transfer, the general agreement was that Argentina was an Atlantic country, and Chile was a Pacific one. Chile has never accepted that and the Chilean view was confirmed by the Court of Arbitration in the Beagle dispute:

It is on this basis, as well as on the actual attribution of Patagonian territory to Argentina effected by Article II of the Treaty, that the Court reaches the conclusion that it was the antithesis Patagonia/Magellan, rather than Magellan/Atlantic, which constituted the fundamental element of the Treaty settlement.

Some errors that would allow a Pacific coast for Argentina in Última Esperanza Sound and an Atlantic coast to Chile in San Sebastián Bay were later corrected, the border in Tierra del Fuego was moved from 68°34'00"W (as FitzRoy erroneously marked the "Cabo del Espiritu Santo") to 68°34'40"W (true longitude of the Cabo) giving 626 km^{2} to Argentina. Different interpretations of the borderline north of latitude 52°S led to the Arbitration of the British King Edward VII in 1902.

Border disputes continued as Patagonia was still an unexplored area. The concept of the continental divide was easy to apply in northern regions, but in Patagonia, drainage basins crossed the Andes, which led to disputes over whether the highest peaks would be the frontier, favoring Argentina, or the drainage basins, favoring Chile. Argentina argued that previous documents referring to the boundary always mentioned the Snowy Cordillera as the frontier and not the continental divide. Argentine explorer Francisco Perito Moreno suggested that many Patagonian lakes draining to the Pacific were part of the Atlantic basin but had been moraine-dammed during the quaternary glaciations, changing their outlets to the west. In 1902, war was again avoided when King Edward VII of Britain agreed to mediate between the two nations. He established the current border in the Patagonia region in part by dividing many disputed lakes into two equal parts; most of these lakes still have one name on each side of the frontier.

The dispute that arose in the northern Puna de Atacama was resolved with the Puna de Atacama Lawsuit of 1899, though its real cause was out of the scope of the 1881 boundary treaty and originated from transfers between Bolivia and Argentina of land occupied by Chile during the Pacific war.

Some problems of the treaty

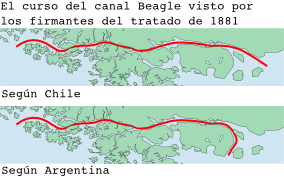
1904 Argentina changed its view of the Beagle Channel

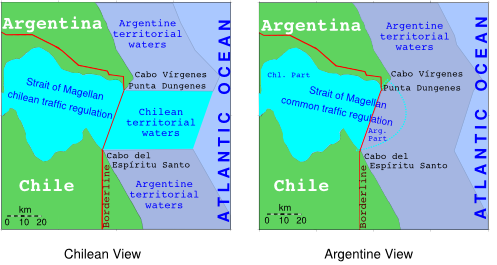
Two views of the east entrance of the Strait of Magellan

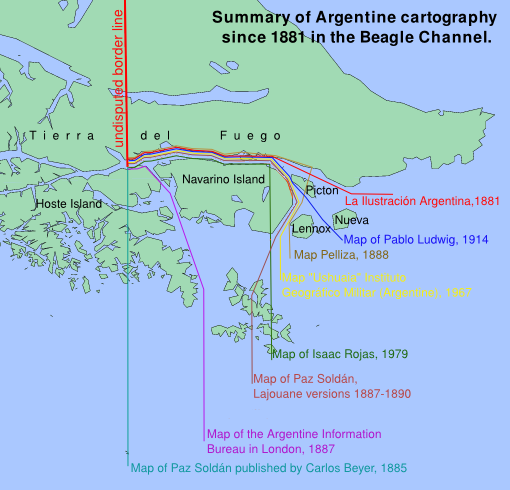
Eight different Argentine interpretations of the treaty at the Cape Horn

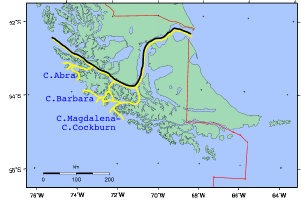
Chilean (black) and Argentine (yellow) views of the Strait of Magellan

== Additional protocols ==
To prevent relations from being aggravated and to complement the treaty a succession of protocols and declarations had to be signed:

- 1889 Zeballos-Matta Declaration (occupation of disputed areas confers no rights)
- 1893 Protocol (to resolve some of the pending issues)
- 1902 Pactos de Mayo May pacts (no Argentine intervention in the Pacific items of Chile, naval arms control and a framework for arbitration)

== Literature ==
The Survivors of the "Jonathan", also known as Magellania, is a novel written by Jules Verne in 1897 and published posthumously in 1909, after it had been rewritten by Verne's son Michel under the title Les naufragés du "Jonathan".

The novel tells the story of a mysterious man named Kaw-djer who lives on Nueva island, whose motto is "Neither God nor master". He refused any contact with western civilization, relying on himself in order to survive and also provides assistance to the indigenous peoples of Magellania. However, the 1881 Boundary Treaty will destroy his paradise of individualist anarchism because it will end the state of terra nullius in the region.

== Analysis ==
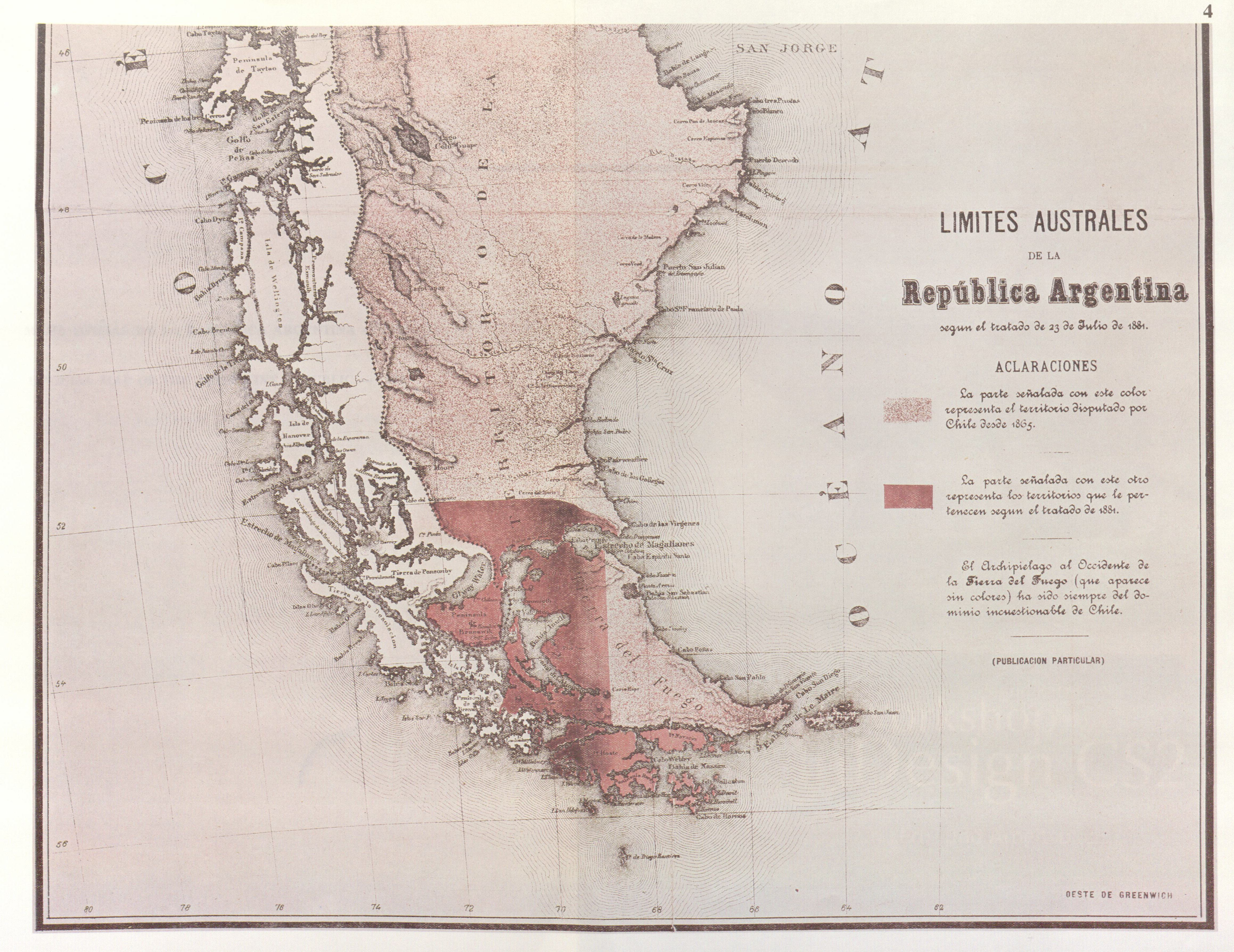
Partial reproduction of the first Argentine map showing the boundaries laid down in the Boundary Treaty of 23 July 1881.

Because each side was convinced of the legitimacy of its own claim, the pretensions of the other party were considered usurpatory, an ill-omened beginning that burdened the relations of both countries.

The treaty did resolve an immediate concern of each side, but subsequently it became evident that in the far south, about 42°S to 52°S, Article 1 of the treaty posed problems of interpretation and application.

Some Argentine political publicists argue that Articles 2 and 3 of the treaty were ambiguous. Nonetheless, the later Argentine interpretations were refused by the international tribunal, that Argentine maps of the first decade also applied the Chilean interpretation and the two papal proposals as well as the treaty of 1984 maintained the Chilean interpretation of the treaty, at least in so far as the land border line.

There could be other reasons for the Argentine difficulties over the interpretation. Michael Morris observes about the Argentine policy:

Rearguard Argentine efforts has been made to gain recognition for some kind of shared management regime for the Strait [of Magellan], in order to mitigate what was perceived as the striking diplomatic defeat for Argentina in the 1881 treaty granting Chile control over the strait.

The Southern Patagonian Ice Field is the last still pending issue to apply the 1881 Boundary Treaty.

== See also ==
- Tierra del Fuego gold rush
- Beagle Channel cartography since 1881
- Beagle conflict
- East Patagonia, Tierra del Fuego and Strait of Magellan dispute
- War of the Pacific

== Bibliography ==
- Michael A. Morris, "The Strait of Magellan", Martinus Nijhoff Publishers, ISBN 0-7923-0181-1, 237 pages.
