= Ernestina =

Ernestina may refer to:

== People ==
- Ernestina Cravello (1880–1942), Italian-American anarcha-feminist
- Clodoaldo de Oliveira, a Brazilian footballer
- Ernestina Edem Appiah, a Ghanaian social entrepreneur
- Ernestina Herrera de Noble (1925–2017), Argentine publisher and executive
- Ernestina A. López (1879–1965), Argentine educator and women's rights activist
- Ernestina "Titina" Silá (1943-1973) Bissau-Guinean revolutionary

== Places ==
- Ernestina, Rio Grande do Sul, a municipality in Brazil
- Santa Ernestina, a municipality in Brazil
- Ernestina, Queensland, a former rural locality in Queensland, Australia, now amalgamated into the locality of Longreach
- Ernestina, Buenos Aires, a town in Argentina

== Other ==
- Effie M. Morrissey, a schooner now known as Ernestina
