= Santiago Avendaño =

Argentine indigenous mediator (1834–1874)

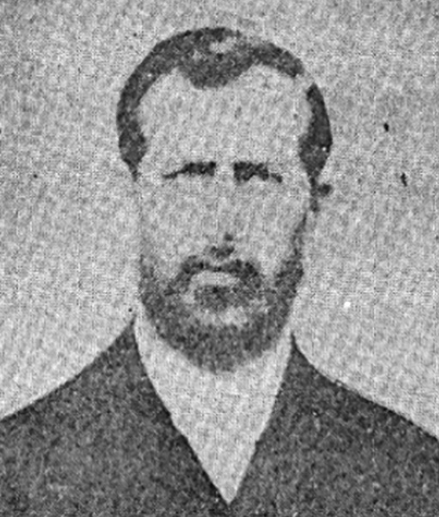
- Born: Santiago Avendaño; July 25, 1834; Argentina
- Died: November 25, 1874 (aged 40); Olavarría, Argentina
- Occupations: interpreter, intermediary
- Known for: Captive of the Ranquel people

Santiago Avendaño (July 25, 1834 – November 25, 1874) was an Argentine intermediary, interpreter, and secretary to Cacique Cipriano Catriel. Born to white parents, he was captured as a child by Ranquel people and lived among them for over seven years. After regaining his freedom, he spent his life as a mediator between indigenous groups and the Argentine government, a role that ultimately led to his violent death at the hands of indigenous warriors during a period of political upheaval.

== Early life and captivity ==
Santiago Avendaño was born on July 25, 1834, the youngest son of Domingo Avendaño and Felipa Lefebre. He had four older brothers—Juan José, Andrés, Pepe, and Fausto—who taught him to read at a very early age, as there were no schools near his home. This early education would later prove invaluable during his captivity.

On March 18, 1842, at the age of seven, Avendaño was taken captive by Ranquel people during a malón (indigenous raid) on a rural establishment in the southern frontier zone of Santa Fe Province. He remained in captivity until escaping on November 1, 1849.

From his writings, we also know that he was adopted by a Ranquel man named Caniú, whom he came to call "father" as he felt himself a member of his family. He was raised by one of Caniú's wives, Pichi Quintuy, as another son. He formed a friendship with his adoptive brother, who was more than twenty years old and was the son of Pichi Quintuy's first marriage to Caniú's deceased brother. It was a custom among them that, after the death of a man, a brother would take charge of the widow and children by marrying the former and adopting the latter.

During his seven years among the Ranquel, Avendaño's literacy and intelligence earned him special treatment. The indigenous people regarded him as a child prodigy, which secured him a favorable position in the toldos (tented settlements). This experience allowed him to develop skills as an intermediary and interpreter between whites and indigenous people—a role he would continue to exercise even after gaining his freedom.

== Second captivity ==
On May 27, 1850, barely six months after regaining his freedom, Avendaño was imprisoned again. A severe storm had led many young men to believe that mandatory military exercises scheduled for the following day had been suspended. However, authorities conducted a roll call of those absent, and all were imprisoned by order of Juan Manuel de Rosas. Avendaño—not yet 16 years old—was among those arrested. According to his manuscripts, this second captivity was far more cruel and unjust than his first. He remained imprisoned until June 6. By Rosas' orders, he was then immediately forcibly conscripted. He served until the dictator's fall in 1852, an unwilling eyewitness to the daily executions ordered by Rosas.

== Career as intermediary ==
Following his release, Avendaño served as an interpreter in the toldos of Calfucurá at Salinas Grandes (1853 and 1856), negotiating for peace. This experience gave him firsthand knowledge of the major indigenous groups of the nineteenth-century pampas and the political operations of their leaders.

Cipriano Catriel, who had fought alongside his father at the Battle of Caseros (February 3, 1852)—the battle that led to Rosas's resignation and exile—offered his friendship to Avendaño. Catriel appointed him as secretary during parlamentos (negotiations) and as interpreter with the government. The government likewise requested Avendaño's services as mediator with the Ranquel. He thus became friends with both sides, serving as emissary between two worlds.

Avendaño purchased land in Azul, where he cultivated crops and raised livestock. He married Genoveva Montenegro, sister of Juan Montenegro (who would later become Cipriano Catriel's biographer). The couple had seven children, though their three eldest died in the smallpox epidemic of 1867.

For many years, Avendaño served as Cipriano Catriel's personal secretary, working toward peaceful consensus. The relationship was strengthened through ritual kinship: Genoveva Montenegro served as godmother to one of Catriel's children, making Avendaño and Catriel compadres. Other compadres of Catriel included Colonel Francisco de Elía and General Ignacio Rivas. Such godparent relationships became common practice in "contact zones" to unite Christians and Indians in new generations and strengthen bonds between elders.

== The Battle of San Carlos (1872) and growing resentment ==
A critical event that sealed both Catriel's and Avendaño's fates occurred during the Battle of San Carlos de Bolívar in March 1872. General Rivas and Colonel Juan Carlos Boer fought Calfucurá with the support of Cipriano Catriel and 800 of his warriors. Calfucurá had expected that at the decisive moment, Catriel's people would defect to his side. However, anticipating this, Catriel gave the order that line soldiers be placed behind his own warriors to shoot any who attempted to flee or desert. Avendaño, as Catriel's secretary and friend, was responsible for translating and delivering this request to General Rivas, as Rivas himself recorded in his official report. This strategy secured victory over Calfucurá but earned Catriel the deep resentment of his own people. From that point forward, many indigenous warriors viewed Catriel and Avendaño as one and the same—a perception that would have deadly consequences two years later.

== Death ==
On September 24, 1874, a revolution led by Bartolomé Mitre broke out against President-elect Nicolás Avellaneda. Cipriano Catriel, two thousand lancers, and Avendaño joined the rebellion under General Rivas. However, most of the indigenous warriors revolted against the cacique. Led by Catriel's own brother, Juan José Catriel, they switched sides to join Colonel Hilario Lagos.

Cornered, Cipriano Catriel and Avendaño surrendered to Colonel Lagos and were taken prisoner. They were then handed over to the rebel Ranquel to be executed according to indigenous custom.

Jorge Reyes, a young junior officer who witnessed the events, testified:

"… sería como las ocho de la mañana cuando se presentaron los indios, [...] habrían pedido al Coronel don Julio Campos, la entrega de los presos, para castigarlos de acuerdo a sus leyes, [...] dos grupos [a caballo y armados a lanza] echaron pie a tierra y mataron a lanza a Catriel y a su secretario, degollándolos inmediatamente; esto fue tan rápido que no dio lugar a ninguna intervención de las fuerzas que en ese momento se encontraban formadas haciendo relevos de las guardias. El que mandaba las fuerzas de los indios era Juan José Catriel, quien degolló a su hermano…"
"It would have been about eight in the morning when the indigenous people appeared, [...] they must have asked Colonel Don Julio Campos for the prisoners, to punish them according to their laws. [...] two groups [on horseback and armed with lances] dismounted and killed Catriel and his secretary with lances, immediately beheading them; this was so fast that there was no time for any intervention by the forces that were at that moment formed up doing guard relief. The one commanding the indigenous forces was Juan José Catriel, who beheaded his brother..."

It is probable that Catriel's tribe had sufficient motives to rebel against their cacique, who was known for his authoritarianism and excessive personal ambitions. During periods of peace, he lived in the frontier town of Azul, "slept in a bed with sheets, wore an Army uniform, used a carriage, and had a bank account in the local town"—behavior poorly regarded among his people. Avendaño, as his friend and faithful advisor, was implicated in the general resentment.

Nevertheless, Avendaño's death was a tragedy: a man who dedicated his life to mediating and promoting peace between Ranquel and Christians was betrayed and murdered by both sides.
