= Pedernales =

Pedernales may refer to:

Geography

- Salar de Pedernales, Chile
- Pedernales Province, Dominican Republic
  - Pedernales, Dominican Republic, its capital
- Pedernales Canton, Manabí Province, Ecuador
  - Pedernales, Ecuador, its capital
- Pedernales, Vizcaya, Vizcaya, Spain
- Pedernales River, Texas, United States
- Pedernales Falls State Park, Texas, United States
- Pedernales (Cabo Rojo), a barrio in Cabo Rojo, Puerto Rico
- Pedernales, Delta Amacuro (Delta Amacuro State), Venezuela
- Pedernales, Buenos Aires, Argentina

Transport

- SS Pedernales, a tanker ship attacked by the German submarine U-156 in 1942, during World War II
