= Veinticinco de Mayo Partido =

25 de Mayo Partido de Veinticinco de Mayo
- Partido
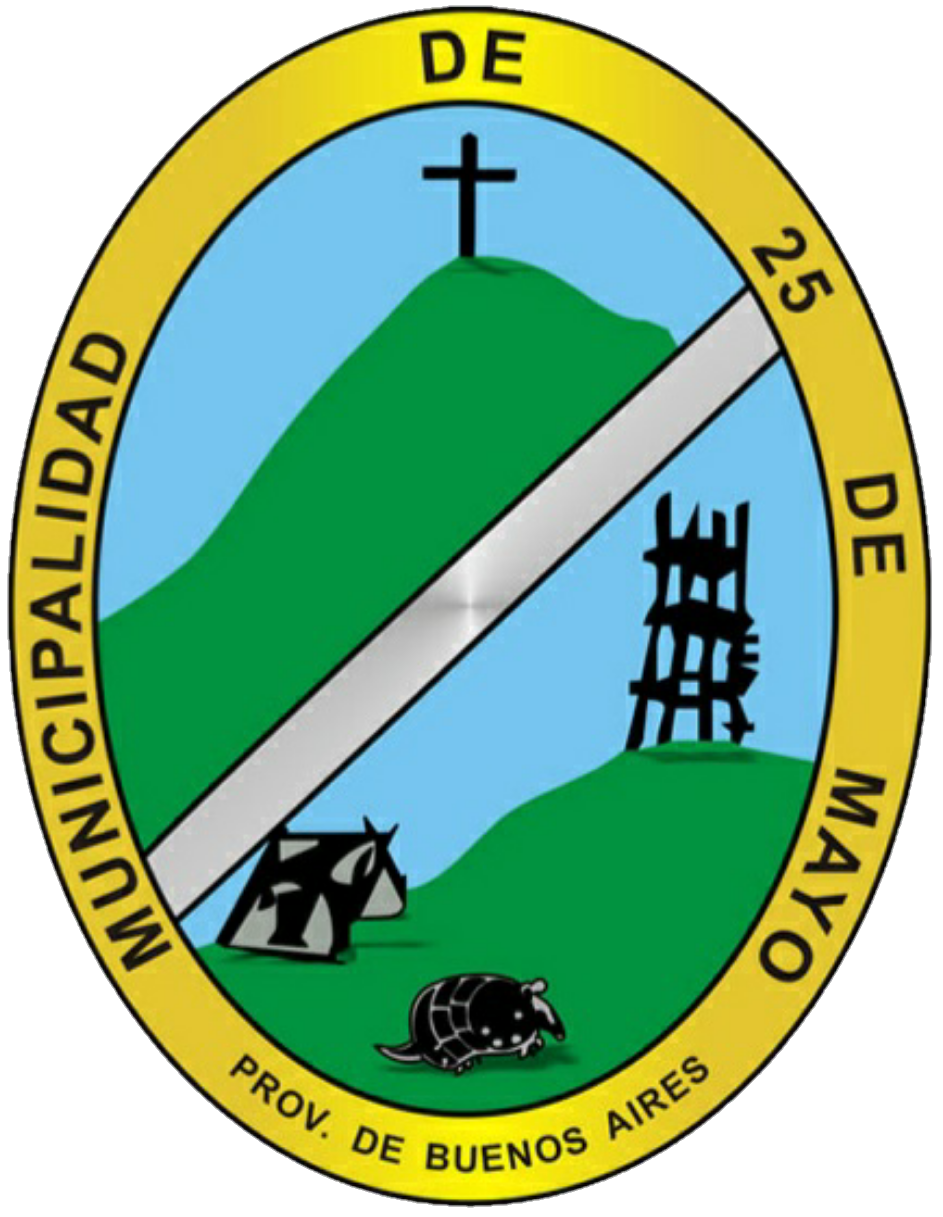
- Coat of arms

- location of Veinticinco de Mayo Partido in Buenos Aires Province
- Coordinates: 35°25′S 60°10′W
- Country: Argentina
- Province: Buenos Aires
- Established: November 8, 1836
- Founder: Coronel Juan Isidro Quesada
- Seat: Veinticinco de Mayo

Government
  - Intendant: Ramiro Egüen (Acción Ciudadana 25 de Mayo)

Area
  - Total: 4,769 km^{2} (1,841 sq mi)

Population
  - Total: 34,877
  - Density: 7.313/km^{2} (18.94/sq mi)
- Demonym: venticinqueño
- Postal Code: B6660
- IFAM: BUE130
- Area Code: 02345
- Patron saint: Na. Sra. del Rosario
- Website: www.25demayo.gob.ar

Veinticinco de Mayo Partido (25 May) is a partido in the centre-north of Buenos Aires Province in Argentina.

The provincial subdivision has a population of about 35,000 inhabitants in an area of 4,769 km^{2} (1,841 sq mi), and its capital city is Veinticinco de Mayo, which is around 228 km (142 mi) from Buenos Aires.

== Settlements ==
- Veinticinco de Mayo
- Norberto de La Riestra
- Pedernales
- Del Valle
- Gobernador Ugarte
- Valdés
- San Enrique
- Agustín Mosconi
- Ernestina
- Lucas Monteverde
- Antonio M. Islas
- Huetel
- Santiago Garbarini
- Ortiz de Rosas
- Martín Berraondo
- Anderson
- Araujo
- Mamaguita
- Pueblitos
- Blas Durañona
