= Valdés, Buenos Aires =

Valdés
- Town
- Location within Buenos Aires Province
- Coordinates: 35°39′S 60°29′W
- Country: Argentina
- Province: Buenos Aires
- Partidos: Veinticinco de Mayo
- Established: March 7, 1905
- Elevation: 69 m (226 ft)

Population (2001 Census)
  - Total: 519
- Time zone: UTC−3 (ART)
- CPA Base: B 6667
- Climate: Dfc

Valdés is a town located in the Veinticinco de Mayo Partido in the province of Buenos Aires, Argentina.

== History ==
Valdés is considered to have been founded on March 7, 1905, by a rural doctor who owned the land that would make up the town. The founder of the town had previously built a sawmill that employed multiple locals. The town consists of 32 blocks in a grid pattern.

== Population ==
According to INDEC, which collects population data for the country, the town had a population of 519 people as of the 2001 census.
