= Camino de los chilenos =

Camino de los chilenos (Spanish: Road of the Chileans) or Rastrillada de los chilenos were a group of routes in Patagonia used by Mapuches and related araucanized tribes to head cattle stolen during malones from Argentina to Chile across the Andes. Camino de los chilenos ran a length of about 1000 km from the Buenos Aires Province to the mountain passes of Neuquén Province. The cattle were traded in Chile for weapons, food and alcoholic beverages. This trade has been pointed out as one of the most important causes of the war that affected the southern provinces of Argentina during large parts of the 19th century. Therefore, the demand for cattle by Chilean merchants was fueling the conflict in Argentina. To counter the cattle raids a trench called Zanja de Alsina was built by Argentina in the pampas in the 1870s. The use of this trade route effectively ended with the Conquest of the Desert (1876–1878) carried out by the Argentine Army.

== Sources ==
- Richard O. Perry, "Argentina and Chile: The Struggle for Patagonia 1843-1881", The Americas, Vol. 36, No. 3 (Jan., 1980), pp. 347–363, published by Academy of American Franciscan History
