= Norberto de La Riestra =

- Town
- Location within Buenos Aires Province
- Coordinates: 35°16′S 59°46′W
- Country: Argentina
- Province: Buenos Aires
- Partidos: Veinticinco de Mayo
- Established: June 9, 1897
- Elevation: 42 m (138 ft)

Population (2001 Census)
  - Total: 4,020
- Time zone: UTC−3 (ART)
- CPA Base: B 6663
- Climate: Dfc

Norberto de La Riestra is a town located in the Veinticinco de Mayo Partido in the province of Buenos Aires, Argentina.

== History ==
The town was founded on June 9, 1897, when a man named John Vela sold part of his land for the construction of a railway station that would serve what would become the town. Train services were operated by the Ferrocarril del Sur and the Ferrocarril del Oeste. The town itself was platted in 1901.

== Population ==
According to INDEC, which collects population data for the country, the town had a population of 4,020 people as of the 2001 census.
