= Francisco de Borja Echeverría =

Francisco José de Borja Echeverría (Santiago 1848- Santiago 1904) was a Chilean Conservative Party deputy and diplomat. He finished his secondary education at Instituto Nacional. In 1871 he graduated as lawyer working both as lawyer and teacher. From 1876 to 1879 he worked as deputy for Ovalle.

He was appointed Consul General in Argentina for the time of the Boundary treaty of 1881 between Chile and Argentina. From its founding in 1882 to 1884 he directed the Chilean agency for colonization and immigration with its headquarters in Paris.

The period of 1885 to 1888, he served again as deputy this time for La Victoria.

He was a commissioner of the Chilean exhibition at the Saint Louis Worlds Fair of 1904.
