= Conrado Villegas =

Argentine general

Conrado Excelso Villegas
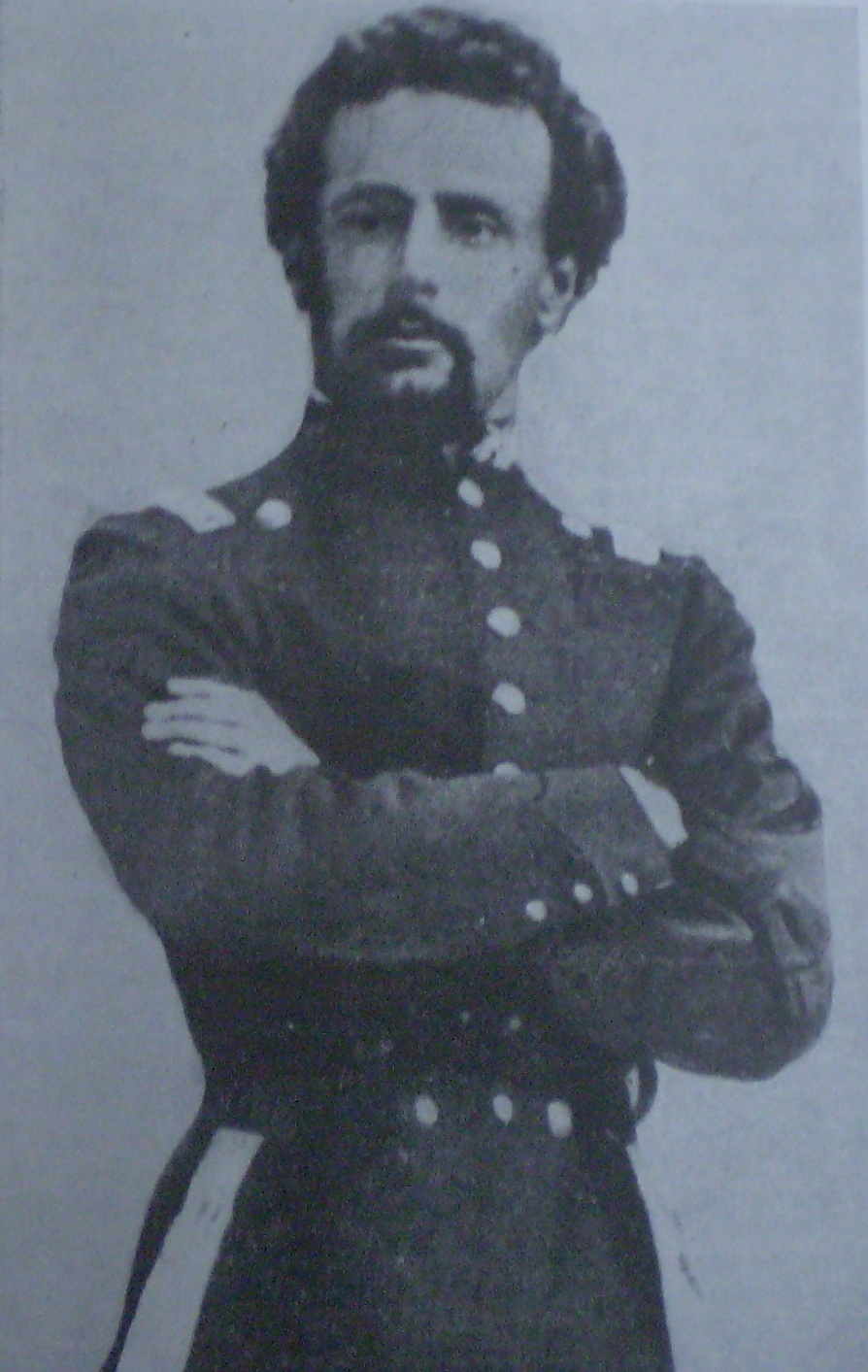
- Conrado Villegas
- Born: February 3, 1841; Tala, Uruguay
- Died: April 26, 1884 (aged 43); Paris, France

Conrado Villegas (February 3, 1841 – April 26, 1884) was an Argentine general in the 1880s during the presidency of Julio Argentino Roca. He is famous for his campaigns in Neuquén and Río Negro during the Conquest of the Desert to subdue the Indigenous population in the south of Argentina. The town of General Villegas, in the northwest of Buenos Aires Province bears his name.
