= Gobernador Ugarte =

- Town
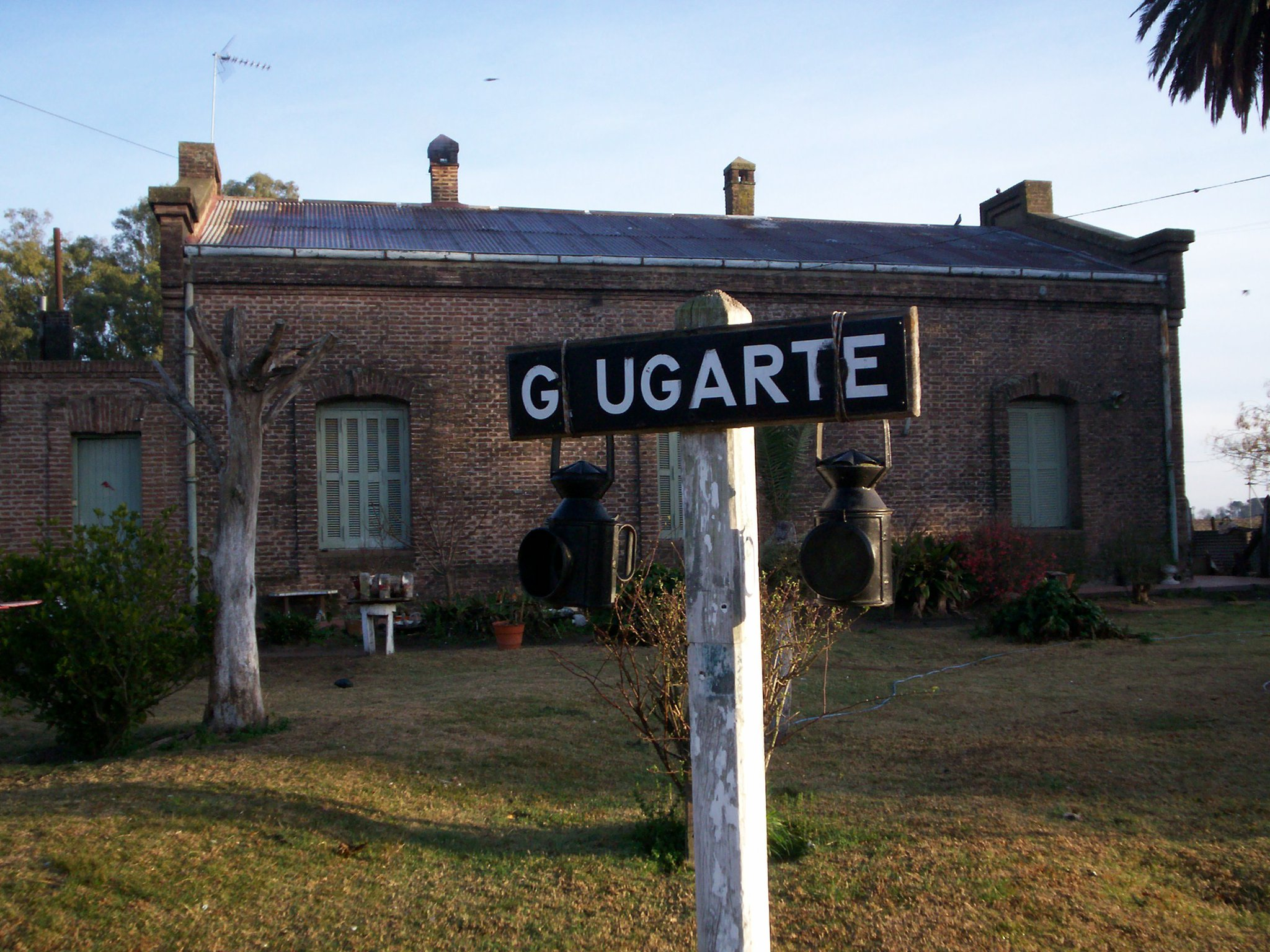
- Rail station

- Location within Buenos Aires Province
- Coordinates: 35°09′52″S 60°04′42″W
- Country: Argentina
- Province: Buenos Aires
- Partidos: Veinticinco de Mayo
- Established: May 31, 1908
- Elevation: 41 m (135 ft)

Population (2001 Census)
  - Total: 561
- Time zone: UTC−3 (ART)
- CPA Base: B 6621
- Climate: Dfc

Gobernador Ugarte is a town located in the Veinticinco de Mayo Partido in the province of Buenos Aires, Argentina.

== History ==
A railway station was established in what would become the town in 1906, attracting settlers. The town was established on May 31, 1908. Ugarte was named after a prominent Buenos Aires governor. A school was built in the town in 1916. In 1950, the building housing the town's municipal delegation was inaugurated.

== Population ==
According to INDEC, which collects population data for the country, the town had a population of 561 people as of the 2001 census.
