= Calfucurá =

19th-century Mapuche leader

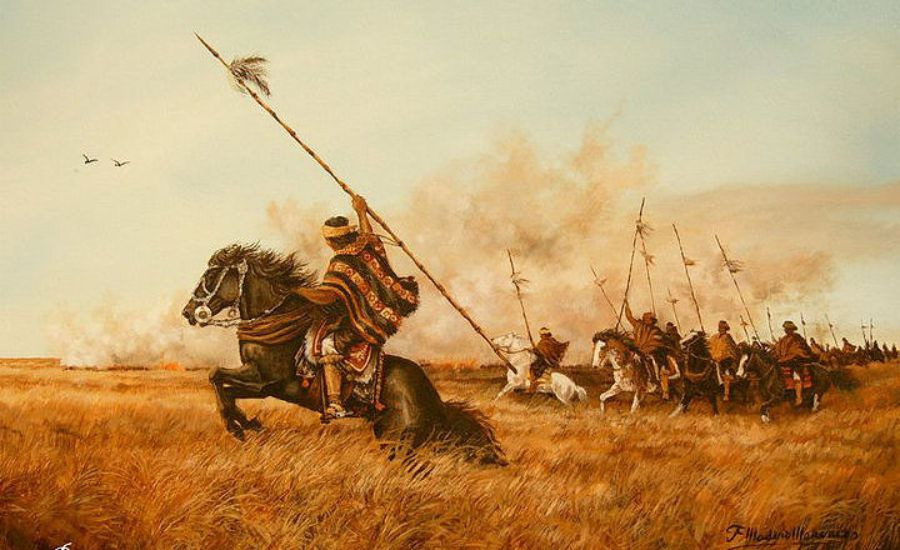
- Born: c. 1778; Llaima, Araucania
- Died: June 4, 1873 (aged 94-95); Salinas Grandes, La Pampa, Argentina
- Title: Lonco
- Successor: Manuel Namuncurá

Calfucurá (from Mapudungun Kallfükura, 'blue stone'; from kallfü, 'blue', and kura, 'stone') also known as Juan Calfucurá or Cufulcurá (b. late 1770s; d. 1873), was a leading Mapuche lonco and military figure in Patagonia in the 19th century. He crossed the Andes from Araucania to the Pampas around 1830 after a call from the governor of Buenos Aires, Juan Manuel de Rosas, to fight the Boroanos tribe. Calfucurá succeeded in ending the military power of the Boroanos when he massacred a large part of them in 1834 during a meeting for trade.

After the defeat of the Boroanos, Calfucurá settled in the Salinas Grandes area along with several other indigenous groups. He built a network of power that extended into the Araucanía Region as well as the southern frontier region of the Argentine Pampas, based on the strategic redistribution of goods, the development of kinship ties, and commercial relations. At the same time, he entered into diplomatic relations with both the State of Buenos Aires and the Argentine Confederation.

In 1859 he attacked Bahía Blanca in Argentina with 3,000 warriors.

The decision of planning and executing the Conquest of the Desert was probably triggered by the 1872 assault of Calfucurá and his 6,000 followers on the cities of General Alvear, Veinticinco de Mayo and Nueve de Julio, where 300 criollos were killed, and 200,000 heads of cattle taken.

== The Blue Stone ==
The name Calfucurá means 'blue stone' in the Mapuche language. Juan Calfucurá was given this name because of a blue stone he found as a boy. He kept and venerated the stone for the rest of his life. Juan Calfucurá's grandson Alfredo Namuncurá (meaning 'foot of stone') is attributed this statement about the stone:

"The most precious thing that we still keep as a family in our tribe is the celebrated Blue Stone found by my grandfather Calfucurá on the shores of a lake in Chile in his youth. This encounter was at the root of his name, Calfucurá, which means blue stone. He always carried it with him, believing that it held the destiny and the future of himself and his entire tribe. This Blue Stone was inherited by my deceased father [ Manuel Namuncurá ], and as long as we kept it with veneration and respect, we were lucky and prosperous. I inherited it after the death of my brother Julián, when I took command of the tribe. Now we keep it in a chest with [my father] the colonel's two swords."

The Blue Stone is the source of many legends. Some believe it was given to Juan Calfucurá by a spirit, and that the stone made him invincible. It's said that his enemies feared it.
