= Pedernales, Buenos Aires =

Pedernales
- Town
- Location within Buenos Aires Province
- Coordinates: 35°15′S 59°39′W
- Country: Argentina
- Province: Buenos Aires
- Partidos: Veinticinco de Mayo
- Elevation: 34 m (112 ft)

Population (2001 Census)
  - Total: 1,369
- Time zone: UTC−3 (ART)
- CPA Base: B 6665
- Climate: Dfc

Pedernales is a town located in the Veinticinco de Mayo Partido in the province of Buenos Aires, Argentina.

== Geography ==
Pedernales is located 176 km (109 mi) from the city of Buenos Aires.

== History ==
The town was named after a lagoon discovered by an expedition led by Félix de Azara, a Spanish general. The town grew rapidly following the arrival of passenger rail service. During this time, Pedernales would begin to overtake the population and importance of the nearby village of Ernestina. Passenger rail service would end in the 1990s, and in 2016, cargo service also ended and the station fell into disuse.

== Population ==
According to INDEC, which collects population data for the country, the town had a population of 1,369 people as of the 2001 census.
