= Ernestina, Buenos Aires =

Ernestina
- Town
- Location within Buenos Aires Province
- Coordinates: 35°16′S 59°34′W
- Country: Argentina
- Province: Buenos Aires
- Partidos: Veinticinco de Mayo
- Established: 1896
- Elevation: 29 m (95 ft)

Population (2001 Census)
  - Total: 222
- Time zone: UTC−3 (ART)
- CPA Base: B 6665
- Climate: Dfc

Ernestina is a town located in the northeastern edge of the Veinticinco de Mayo Partido in the province of Buenos Aires, Argentina. The town has suffered a massive loss in population since peaking in the 1920s, and is now considered to be mostly abandoned.

== Geography ==
Ernestina is located 177 km (110 mi) from the city of Buenos Aires. The town sits along the Salado River, and as a result is occasionally prone to flooding.

== History ==
The land now making up Ernestina was acquired from the native population by a pair of English immigrant brothers in 1852. Initially, the area was used for farming until one of the brothers decided to establish a town in the region, presumably as a condition for settling in the region. The other brother is believed to have gone on to found the town of Pedernales, around 7 km (4.3 mi) to the west. Rail service to Ernestina began in 1896, which is considered the date of the town's founding. The town was named after the wife of Ernestina's founder. Around this time, a grouping of palm trees imported from the Canary Islands were planted in the central town square.

In 1912, a church was constructed in Ernestina. In 1938, a 200-seat theater was completed in the town. The theater has since been abandoned.

In 1925, Edward VIII, at the time prince of the United Kingdom, passed through the town on his way to an estate nearby, with some claiming he stopped to visit the town before continuing to the villa he would stay at. However, whether he actually stopped or spent any significant time in Ernestina is debated.

The town peaked in both status and population in the 1920s during the high point of the railroad. Later, Ernestina would begin to be overshadowed economically by the nearby town of Pedernales. Nowadays, the town has largely been described as abandoned, with only a fraction of the town's original population remaining, most having left primarily to larger cities in search of better economic opportunities.

== Economy ==
During the town's peak, it was a center for the theater and tailoring industries. In more recent years, following Ernestina's decline, the economy of the town has mostly been centered around tourism.

== Population ==
At its peak, Ernestina had a population of around 1,800 residents, a number which fell sharply after the end of rail service. According to INDEC, which collects population data for the country, the town had a population of 222 people as of the 2001 census, representing a nearly 90% decline from its original peak.
