= Veinticinco de Mayo, Buenos Aires =

Town in Buenos Aires Province, Argentina

Veinticinco de Mayo
- Town
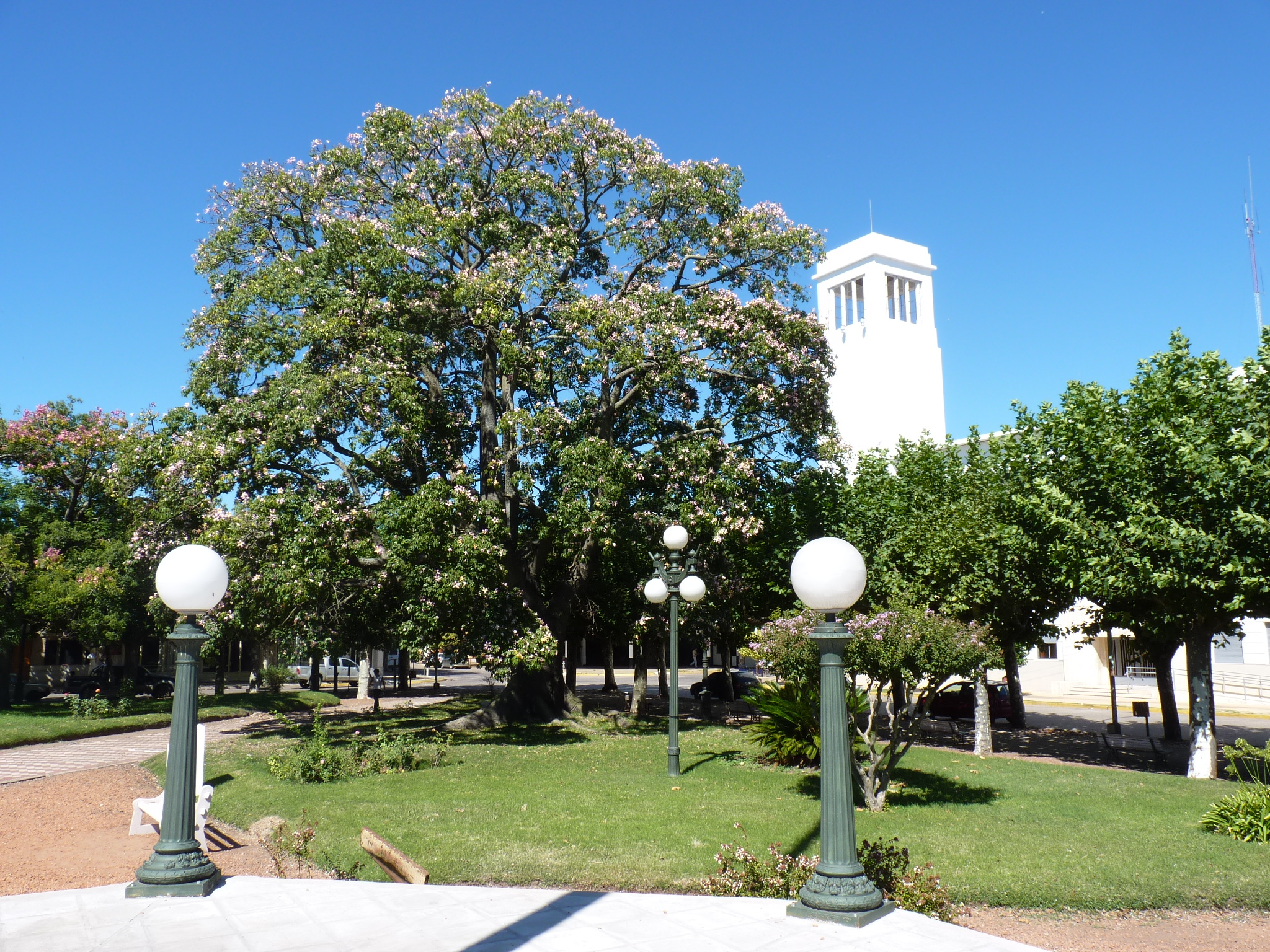

- Location in Argentina
- Coordinates: 35°25′S 60°10′W
- Country: Argentina
- Province: Buenos Aires
- Partido: Veinticinco de Mayo
- Founded: November 8, 1836
- Elevation: 58 m (190 ft)

Population (2010 census [INDEC])
  - Total: 23,408
- CPA Base: B 6660
- Area code: +54 2345

Veinticinco de Mayo (or 25 de Mayo) (in English: 25 May) is a town situated in the centre of Buenos Aires Province in Argentina and has a population of 22,581 (2001). Founded on 8 November 1836, it is the capital city of the partido of the same name. The city takes its name from 25 May 1810, the day on which Buenos Aires began the process leading to a formal declaration of independence by forming its own junta (assembly) and inviting the other provinces to join it. The city is 220 km from Buenos Aires, and 240 km from La Plata, the provincial capital.

Plaza Mitre in the centre of the city is one of the most attractive and well looked after squares in the region. In recent years, the town has greatly benefited from the boom in agricultural production.
