= Malón =

Raids by Mapuche warriors

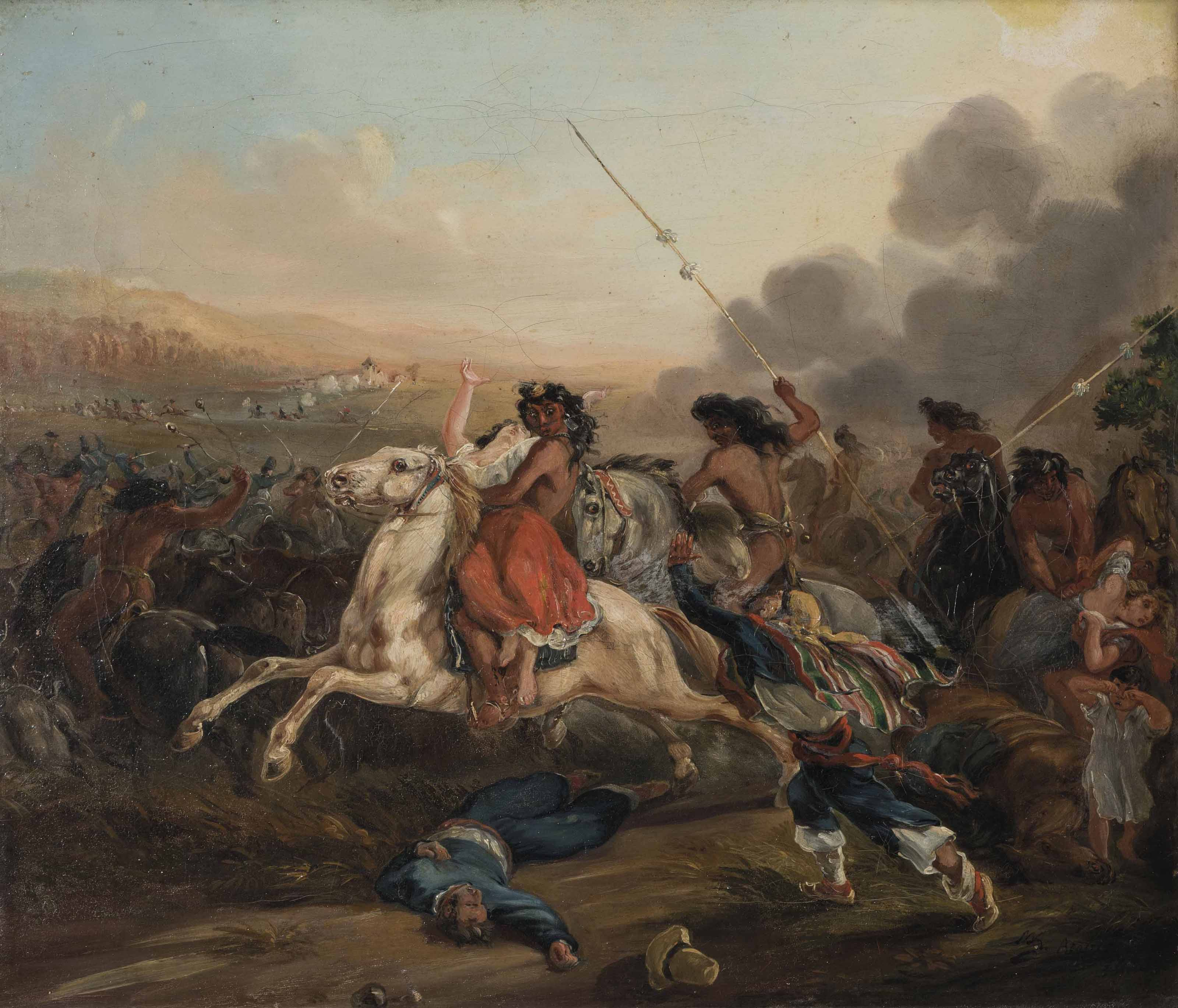
El malón (1834) by Johann Moritz Rugendas

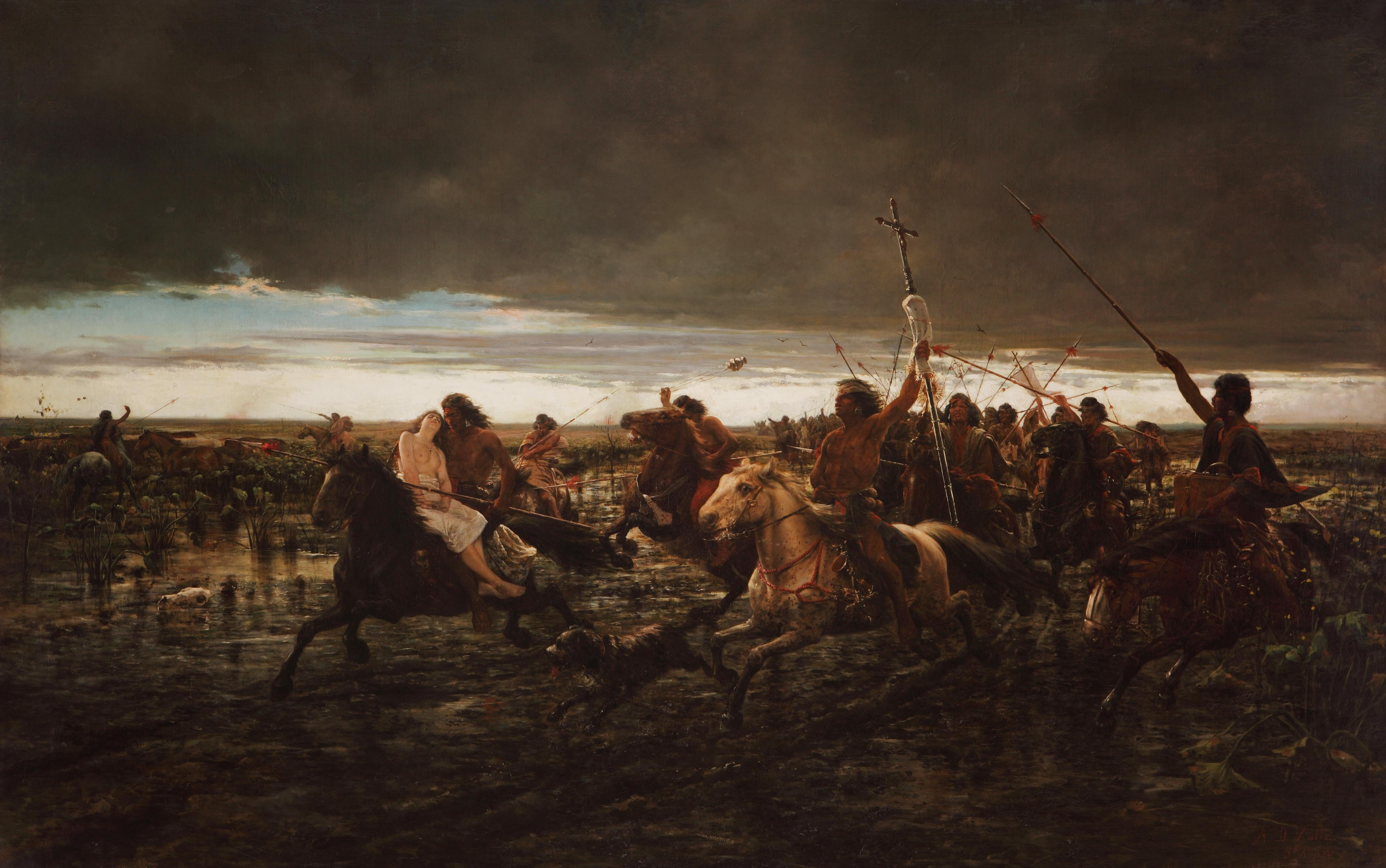
La vuelta del malón (1892) by Ángel Della Valle

Malón (from the Mapudungun maleu, to inflict damage to the enemy) is the name given to plunder raids carried out by Mapuche warriors, who rode horses into Spanish, Chilean and Argentine territories from the 17th to the 19th centuries, as well as to their attacks on rival Mapuche factions. Historian Juan Ignacio Molina said the Mapuche considered the malón to be a means of obtaining justice:

The injured family often assumes the right of pursuing the aggressor or his relations, and of punishing them. From this abuse are derived the denominations and distinctions, so much used in their jurisprudence, of genguerin, genguman, genla, &c. denoting the principal connections of the aggressor, of the injured, or the deceased, who are supposed to be authorized, by the laws of nature, to support by force the rights of their relatives. When those who are at enmity have a considerable number of adherents, they mutually make incursions upon each other's possessions, where they destroy or burn all that they cannot carry off. These private quarrels, called malones, resemble much the feuds of the ancient Germans, and are very dreadful when the Ulmenes are concerned, in which case they become real civil wars. But it must be acknowledged that they are generally unaccompanied with the effusion of blood, and are confined to pillage alone. This people, notwithstanding their propensity to violence, rarely employ arms in their private quarrels, but decide them with the fist or with the club.

Leaders such as Lientur used the malón against European colonists: it consisted of a fast surprise attack by a number of mounted Mapuche warriors against the white (huinca) populations, ranches, settlements and fortifications in Chile and Argentina, with the aim of obtaining horses, cattle, provisions, and captives, often young women. The rapid attack without formal order did not give the targets time to organise any defence, and it left behind a devastated population unable to retaliate or pursue.

In Chile, the Spaniards responded with a system of fortifications known as La Frontera, garrisoned by a standing army that patrolled the border along the Biobío River. In Argentina, where the Mapuche in the 19th century ravaged the southern frontier, the government responded by building wooden outposts and occasionally fortresses, e.g. Fortaleza Protectora Argentina, as well as the Zanja de Alsina. This trench covered hundreds of kilometres across the Pampas to make incursions more difficult, as well as prevent the raiders from driving large numbers of cattle back across the frontier. Ultimately, the Argentine government invaded and conquered the Mapuche in their territory in the Conquest of the Desert of the late 1870s. Many Mapuche were killed and thousands more taken prisoner.

== Sources ==
- Juan Ignatius Molina, "The Geographical, Natural, and Civil History of Chili", Longman, Hurst, Rees, and Orme, London, 1809
- Commandante Manuel Prado (1863-1932): La guerra al Malón (The war against the Malón), 1907
  - New edition: Prado, Manuel (2010) La guerra al Malón, Editorial Claridad SA, Buenos Aires, ISBN 978-950-620-206-4
