= Zanja de Alsina =

Argentine defense system

Zanja de Alsina (Spanish pronunciation: [ˈsaŋxa ðe alˈsina], Alsina's trench) were a system of trenches and wooden watchtowers (mangrullos) built in the central and southern parts of Buenos Aires Province to defend the territories of the federal government against indigenous Mapuche malones.

The 3-meter (9.8 ft)-wide trench was reinforced with 80 small strongholds and garrisons, called fortines. The defensive line was named after Adolfo Alsina, Argentine Minister of War under President Nicolás Avellaneda who planned the building of the trench in the 1870s. The trench's purpose was denounced when it became clear that it was unable to stop large-scale incursions between 1876 and 1877.
