= List of country subdivision flags in South America =

Flags of country subdivisions in South America

This page lists the country subdivision flags in South America. It is a part of the Lists of country subdivision flags, which is split into continents due to its size.

== Argentina ==
Argentina is divided into twenty-three federal states called provinces and one called the autonomous city of Buenos Aires, which is the federal capital of the republic as decided by the Argentine Congress. Each has its own official flag.

=== Provinces ===
Flag	Administrative division	Adopted	Description
	Buenos Aires City	1995	The center of the flag of Buenos Aires has a coat of arms created by Spaniard Juan de Garay on October 20, 1580.
	Buenos Aires	1997	See Flag of Buenos Aires Province
	Catamarca	2011	See Flag of Catamarca
	Chaco	2007	A previous design from 1995 by a graphical artist was never adopted as it was deemed a painting and not a symbol.
	Chubut	2004	
	Córdoba	2014	A vertical tricolor of red, white and blue with the Society of Jesus sun in the center of the white stripe.
	Corrientes	1986	The flag traces its heritage to a simpler design created on December 24, 1821, by a Constituent Congress.
	Entre Ríos	1987	It was hoisted for the first time on March 1, 1815. Similar to the Artigas flag.
	Formosa	1991	
	Jujuy	1994	It features the same design as the Bandera Nacional de Nuestra Libertad Civil (Spanish for "National Flag of Our Civil Freedom"), a flag used by Argentine military leader Manuel Belgrano.
	La Pampa	1993	A horizontal triband of blue (top and bottom) and white defaced with the Coat of arms of La Pampa Province at its center.
	La Rioja	1986	
	Mendoza	1992	Known as the flag of the Andes, it was used by Argentine patriot José de San Martín during his military campaigns in Chile and Peru.
	Misiones	1992	A triband, officially adopted on February 12, 1992. The red is a symbol "for the blood spilled to sustain our freedom and independence", the blue, "of our decision for the Republic", and the white, "of our distinction and greatness" according to José Gervasio Artigas.
	Neuquén	1989	
	Río Negro	2009	Probably based on the flag of the Kingdom of Araucanía and Patagonia.
	Salta	1997	See Flag of Salta.
	San Juan	2018	Known as the "Civic Flag", it was first adopted by the IV Division of the Army of the Andes, formed by San Juan natives during the Argentine war for Independence. It is also known as the "Cabot Flag" as the IV Division was led by Lieutenant General Juan Manuel Cabot. It is the only flag of an Argentine province whose reverse differs from the obverse.
	San Luis	1988	The flag displays the provincial coat of arms centered on a white field.
	Santa Cruz	2000	
	Santa Fe	1986	Used unofficially since August 3, 1822, it is a vertical tricolor of red, white and blue with the provincial coat of arms in the center.
	Santiago del Estero	1985	
	Tierra del Fuego	1999	A diagonal bicolor of sky blue and orange with an albatross in the center and the Southern Cross in the fly. See Flag of Tierra del Fuego
	Tucumán	2010	A horizontal triband of white (top and bottom) and blue.

== Bolivia ==
Bolivia is a unitary state consisting of nine departments. Each has its own official flag.

=== Departments ===
Flag	Administrative division	Adopted	Description
	Beni	1851	A green field with a circle of eight five-pointed yellow stars in the centre.
	Chuquisaca	1851	A red saltire resembling two crossed, roughly-pruned (knotted) branches on a white field with a crown in the centre.
	Cochabamba	1851	A cyan field.
	La Paz	1851	A horizontal bicolour of red and green.
	Oruro	1851	A red field.
	Pando	1851	A horizontal bicolour of white and green.
	Potosí	1851	A field quartered in red and white.
	Santa Cruz	1851	A horizontal bicolour triband of green, white and green.
	Tarija	1851	A horizontal bicolour of red and white.

== Brazil ==
=== States ===
Flag	Administrative division	Adopted	Description
	Acre	1995	Rectangle divided by a diagonal line from the bottom left (hoist-side) to the upper right. The top left is yellow with a red star in the corner, and the bottom right is green. See Flag of Acre
	Alagoas	1963	A vertical tricolour of red, white, and blue, with the coat of arms of Alagoas in the centre. See Flag of Alagoas
	Amapá	1988	A horizontal tricolour of blue, green with black-edged white lines, and yellow, with a green triangle based on the hoist-side, bearing a stylized outline of the Fortaleza de São José de Macapá in black and white. The green triangle continues as a horizontal stripe to the fly end. See Flag of Amapá
	Amazonas	1982	Three horizontal stripes of equal length in white, red, and white. A blue canton over the white stripe on the hoist-side, with twenty-five five-pointed silver stars, in four rows of eight, four, four, and eight, respectively, equidistant from each other in proportion to the interior of the rectangle. In the center is a star larger than the others. See Flag of Amazonas
	Bahia	1960	Four alternating horizontal stripes of equal length in white and red; in the upper hoist-side canton, a white triangle on a blue field. See Flag of Bahia
	Ceará	1922	A green field with a large yellow rhombus in the center bearing a white disk, which contains the coat of arms of the state of Ceará. See Flag of Ceará
	Espírito Santo	1947	A horizontal tricolor of light blue, white, and pink; charged with "TRABALHA E CONFIA" (Portuguese for "Work and Trust"), centered on the white stripe. See Flag of Espírito Santo
	Goiás	1919	Eight stripes: four green stripes and four yellow stripes. A blue rectangle on the upper left hoist with five white stars, four on each side and one smaller in the centre. See Flag of Goiás
	Maranhão	1889	Nine stripes in a horizontal direction, interspersed, four white, three red and two black, with a blue canton occupying a third of the length of the flag and half of its width, in the top left with a white star in the centre. See Flag of Maranhão
	Mato Grosso	1890	A blue banner with a white rhombus in its centre which contains a green sphere and yellow star. See Flag of Mato Grosso
	Mato Grosso do Sul	1979	A white diagonal band radiating from the lower hoist-side corner to the top-center. The upper triangle is green and the lower triangle is blue with a yellow five-pointed star in the bottom-right corner. See Flag of Mato Grosso do Sul
	Minas Gerais	1963	A red triangle on a white background, surrounded by the Latin expression "Libertas quæ sera tamen" - motto of the Inconfidência Mineira, which means "Liberty, even if delayed". See Flag of Minas Gerais
	Pará	1890	In the field of sips (red) a silver band (white), carried in the centre of a blau star (blue). See Flag of Pará
	Paraíba	1965	Rectangular flag striped vertically in black and red, with black occupying a third of the flag on the side of the junk, and with the inscription "NEGO" in white, with a twentieth of the width of the flag in the centre of the red stripe.
	Paraná	1892	It is composed of a green quadrilateral, crossed from the upper left angle to the lower right by a large white stripe, bearing a blue circle with the five stars of the Southern Cross (Crux) in lower course. The Cross is depicted with south at the top, as it appears in the night sky. The circle is crossed, below the "Star of Magellan" (Estrela de Magalhães), by a thin stripe that suggests a horizon, featuring the word "PARANÁ" in green, lightened by the only visible star of that constellation. The sphere is surrounded by a branch of Paraná Pine tree — on the right, and by a branch of Yerba mate on the left. See Flag of Paraná
	Pernambuco	1917	A bicolour pennant, blue and white, with the colors broken horizontally into two unequal sections, with blue in the upper and larger rectangle, the rainbow composed of three colors, red, yellow and green, with a star in above and below the sun, inside the semicircle, both in yellow, and, in the lower and smaller white rectangle, a red cross. See Flag of Pernambuco
	Piauí	1922	Divided in thirteen interspersed green and yellow stripes with the same length. In the upper right corner there is a dark blue canton with the length equal to five stripes with a white star in the middle. Below the star, it is written with white letters: "13 DE MARÇO DE 1823" (March 13, 1823). See Flag of Piauí
	Rio de Janeiro	1965	Field quartered in white and sky blue, in the center with the State coat of arms occupying 5/7 of the height.
	Rio Grande do Norte	1957	A horizontal bicolour of green and white with a ratio of 2:3. In the center it is charged with the coat of arms of Rio Grande do Norte. See Flag of Rio Grande do Norte
	Rio Grande do Sul	1966	Two triangles in the colors green (top left) and yellow (bottom left), which are separated by a wide red diagonal band, containing the coat of arms of Rio Grande do Sul. See Flag of Rio Grande do Sul
	Rondônia	1981	A blue field occupies its upper half with a central white star with five equidistant points in the middle of the banner. A green field is formed from the lower edges of the banner to the center of the lower points of the star. Two yellow fields are formed to the right and to the left of the star. See Flag of Rondônia
	Roraima	1996	Divided into three diagonal bands from left to right, and from bottom to top. The colors of the bands are, respectively: turquoise blue, white and flag green. Near the bottom of the flag is a narrow red band. In the centre of the flag, resting on the red band, there is a gold star with dimensions that go beyond that of the central white band. See Flag of Roraima
	Santa Catarina	1953	Three horizontal bands in the color combination red-white-red; In the center of the flag is a green diamond containing the coat of arms of Santa Catarina. See Flag of Santa Catarina
	São Paulo	1946	13 stripes of alternating black and white, with a red canton on the upper left corner. Inside the canton, a yellow star in each corner and a white circle in the middle with a blue map of Brazil. See Flag of São Paulo
	Sergipe	1952	Rectangle divided into four alternating green and yellow stripes, the upper one being green. In the canton (top left), a blue square whose side is half the height of the flag, loaded with five white five-pointed stars, arranged in a quincunx, with the one in the center twice the dimensions of the others. See Flag of Sergipe
	Tocantins	1989	A white diagonal band charged with a gold sun radiating from the lower hoist-side corner. The upper triangle is blue and the lower triangle is yellow. See Flag of Tocantins
	Federal District	1969	A white flag representing peace, with the green stands for the vegetation of the region and Cross of Brasília.

== Chile ==
=== Regions ===
Flag	Administrative division	Adopted	Description
	Arica and Parinacota	2008	A white field with the regional coat of arms in the centre. Below the coat, it is written with black letters: "ARICA Y PARINACOTA; GOBIERNO REGIONAL" (Arica y Parinacota; Regional Government).
	Atacama	1996	A blue field with a five-pointed yellow star in the centre. See Flag of Atacama
	Antofagasta	????	A blue field with the regional Intendant seal in the centre.
	Aysén	2013	A white field with the regional coat of arms in the centre.
	Biobío	????	A white field with the regional coat of arms in the centre. Below the coat, it is written in arched black letters: "REGIÓN DEL BIO-BÍO" (Region of Bio-Bío).
	Coquimbo	2013	A white field with two blue stripes: one on the canton with four white circles resembling the Southern Cross, and another one curved down the flag. A white star cuts both stripes. On the top right, three green hills with a sunset on the background.
	La Araucanía	????	A white field with the regional coat of arms in the centre. Below the coat, it is written in black letters: "REGIÓN DE LA ARAUCANÍA" (Region of the Araucanía).
	Los Lagos	2013	A horizontal bicolour of green and blue with four five-pointed white stars resembling the shape of the Southern Cross in the canton. See Flag of Los Lagos
	Los Ríos	2008	A white field with three wavy stripes of yellow, green and blue in the centre, interrupted in the middle by a circle of twelve five-pointed yellow stars. See Flag of Los Ríos Region
	Magallanes and Antártica Chilena Region	1997	A blue field with a white-edged yellow stripe highlighting six peaks in the bottom. On the blue field, there are five five-pointed white stars resembling the shape of the Southern Cross. See Flag of Magallanes
	Maule	2002	A white field with the regional coat of arms in the centre.
	Ñuble	2018	A white field with the regional coat of arms in the centre.
	O'Higgins	????	A white field with the regional government logo in the centre. Below the coat, it is written with black letters: "REGIÓN DEL LIBERTADOR BERNARDO O'HIGGINS" (Region of the Liberator Bernado O'Higgins).
	Santiago Metropolitan Region	2013	A dark grey field with the regional coat of arms in the center.
	Tarapacá	2008	A white field with the regional coat of arms in the centre.
	Valparaíso	????	A blue field with the regional coat of arms in the centre. Below the coat, it is written with yellow letter: "REGIÓN VALPARAÍSO" (Valparaíso Region).

== Colombia ==
=== Departments ===
Flag	Administrative division	Adopted	Description
	Amazonas	1974	Rectangular defaced black-fimbriated horizontal triband tricolour of unequal sizes in green, yellow (mustard), and white, charged with an indigenous warrior charging a bow and arrow, a pouncing jaguar, and a five-pointed star all in black. See Flag of Amazonas
	Antioquia	1962	A horizontal bicolour of white and green. See Flag of Antioquia
	Arauca	1979	A horizontal bicolour of red and green.
	Atlántico	1989	A horizontal bicolour triband of white, red and white.
	Bogotá	1952	A horizontal bicolour of yellow and red with the Bogotan coat of arms in the centre. See Flag of Bogotá
	Bolívar	1886	A horizontal triband of yellow, green and red. See Flag of Bolívar
	Boyacá	1968	A horizontal tricolour of green (first and fifth stripes), white (second and fourth stripes) and red (central stripe) with five arched Oak leaves in white centered on the red band. See Flag of Boyacá
	Caldas	????	A vertical bicolour of yellow and green.
	Caquetá	1974	Four horizontal stripes of green with the upper left corner bearing a circle of fifteen five-pointed yellow stars surrounding a single star in the centre over a white canvas.
	Casanare	????	Divided diagonally from the upper-fly corner to the lower-hoist corner. The upper-hoist triangle is red and the lower-fly triangle, green. At the centre of the flag is an eight pointed sun in yellow. See Flag of Casanare
	Cauca	????	A horizontal bicolour triband of green, yellow and green.
	Cesar	????	A horizontal bicolour triband of green, white and green. See Flag of Cesar
	Chocó	????	A horizontal tricolour of green, yellow and blue in a 2:1:1 ratio.
	Córdoba	1951	A horizontal tricolour of blue, white and green.
	Cundinamarca	1813	A horizontal tricolour of cyan, yellow and red with the department's coat of arms in the centre.
	Guainía	????	A horizontal tricolour of yellow, blue and green.
	Guaviare	????	A horizontal tricolour of green, white and blue with the department's coat of arms in the centre.
	Huila	1952	A horizontal tricolour of white, green and yellow.
	La Guajira	1966	A horizontal bicolour of green and white. See Flag of La Guajira
	Magdalena	1886	Six horizontal stripes alternating between red and blue, defaced at the centre by thirty white stars forming the shape of a star. See Flag of Magdalena
	Meta	1970	Seventeen horizontal stripes alternating between green and white.
	Nariño	????	A horizontal bicolour of yellow and green.
	Norte de Santander	1978	A horizontal bicolour of red and black with four five-pointed yellow stars forming a rhombus. See Flag of Norte de Santander
	Putumayo	????	A horizontal tricolour of green, white and black. See Flag of Putumayo
	Quindío	????	A vertical tricolour of green, yellow and purple. See Flag of Quindío
	Risaralda	1969	A green field with fourteen arched five-pointed white stars.
	San Andrés y Providencia	1818	A cyan field with a white saltire that extends to the corners of the flag.
	Santander	1972	A horizontal bicolour triband of green and black fimbriated in yellow with a red stripe in the hoist-side that has eight five-pointed white stars. See Flag of Santander
	Sucre	1974	A horizontal bicolour of green and white with the department's coat of arms in the centre.
	Tolima	????	A horizontal bicolour of dark red and yellow.
	Valle del Cauca	1811	A horizontal bicolour of cyan and white surrounded by a silver border. See Flag of Valle del Cauca
	Vaupés	1984	A horizontal bicolour of white and green with a dark green leaf in the centre.
	Vichada	????	A horizontal bicolour of yellow and green.

== Ecuador ==
=== Provinces ===
Flag	Province	Adopted	Description
	Azuay	????	A horizontal bicolour of red and yellow.
	Bolívar	????	A horizontal bicolour of red and green.
	Cañar	????	A horizontal tricolour of blue, yellow and red.
	Carchi	????	A horizontal tricolour of green, yellow and red.
	Chimborazo	????	A horizontal bicolour of red and blue with the provincial coat of arms in the centre.
	Cotopaxi	????	A horizontal bicolour of red and blue.
	El Oro	????	A vertical bicolour triband of green, yellow and green in a 1:2:1 ratio.
	Esmeraldas	????	A horizontal bicolour of white and green.
	Galápagos	????	A horizontal tricolour of green, white and blue.
	Guayas	????	Five alternating horizontal stripes of cyan and white with three linear five-pointed white stars in the centre.
	Imbabura	????	A horizontal tricolour of red, white and green with a blue triangle based at the hoist-side.
	Loja	????	A blue-fimbriated horizontal bicolour of red and yellow with a circle of sixteen five-pointed white stars in the centre.
	Los Ríos	????	A horizontal bicolour triband of green, white and green.
	Manabí	????	Five alternating horizontal stripes of green and white with a red triangle based at the hoist and twenty-two arched five-pointed red stars on the centre-right.
	Morona-Santiago	????	A horizontal bicolour of yellow and green.
	Napo	????	Four horizontal bands of yellow, white, blue and red in a 3:1:1:1 ratio.
	Orellana	????	A horizontal tricolour of white, green and yellow with a vertical black stripe containing four five-pointed white stars at the hoist-side.
	Pastaza	????	A bicolour quadrisection of green and yellow.
	Pichincha	????	A vertical bicolour of yellow and red.
	Santo Domingo de los Tsáchilas	????	A bicolour quadrisection of green and red with a white saltire including two thin black lines near its edges and a yellow and white sun with sixteen rays alternating straight and wavy charged with a multicolored colibri at the centre.
	Santa Elena	????	A vertical tricolour of green, blue and cyan.
	Sucumbíos	????	A horizontal tricolour of green, white and yellow.
	Tungurahua	????	A horizontal bicolour triband of red, green and red.
	Zamora-Chinchipe	????	A horizontal tricolour of white, green and yellow.

== Guyana ==
=== Regions ===
Flag	Date	Use	Description
	????	Flag of Barima-Waini	
	????	Flag of Cuyuni-Mazaruni	
	????	Flag of Demerara-Mahaica	
	????	Flag of East Berbice-Corentyne	
	????	Flag of Essequibo Islands-West Demerara	
	????	Flag of Mahaica-Berbice	
	????	Flag of Pomeroon-Supenaam	
	????	Flag of Potaro-Siparuni	
	????	Flag of Upper Demerara-Berbice	
	????	Flag of Upper Takutu-Upper Essequibo	

== Paraguay ==
=== Departments ===
Flag	Date	Use	Description
	??? – Today	Flag of Asunción	A horizontal tricolor of red (upwards), White and red with the department's arms in the center.
	??? – Today	Flag of Alto Paraguay	A horizontal tricolor of red, White and blue with the motto “forcé, life, prosperity” in the center.
	??? – Today	Flag of Alto Paraná	A vertical tricolor of green, White and Brown.
	??? – Today	Flag of Amambay	A red field with the white-edged green Nordic cross that extends to the edges; the vertical part of the cross is shifted to the hoist side.
	??? – Today	Flag of Boquerón	A horizontal tricolor of blue, White and green.
	??? – Today	Flag of Caaguazú	A horizontal tricolor of red, White and blue with 5 green stars in the center.
	??? – Today	Flag of Caazapá	A horizontal bicolor of green and red with a white square ended on the upper hoist-side corner of the green band.
	??? – Today	Flag of Canindeyú	a green with 3 bands of blue, White and red downwards.
	??? – Today	Flag of Central	a White field with a red stripe and 19 blue stars.
	??? – Today	Flag of Concepción	a diagonal bicolor of blue and White and a red stripe between.
	??? – Today	Flag of Cordillera	Two equal horizontal bands of white (top) and green with a red-edged blue isosceles triangle based on the hoist side, a golden 12-pointed star inside the triangle and the department's arms in the center.
	??? – Today	Flag of Guairá	a horizontal bicolor of cyan and purple.
	??? – Today	Flag of Itapúa	a horizontal tricolor of green, White and red with the department's arms in the center.
	??? – Today	Flag of Misiones	a horizontal tricolor of yellow, White and green separated by two narrow stripes of red and blue and the department's arms in the center.
	??? – Today	Flag of Ñeembucú	a horizontal tricolor of White, mint and blue.
	??? – Today	Flag of Paraguarí	A white cross with the department's arms in the center that divides the flag into four rectangles, red and green at the top and green and red at the bottom.
	??? – Today	Flag of Presidente Hayes	a horizontal tricolor of green (upwards), White and green.
	??? – Today	Flag of San Pedro	a vertical tricolor of blue, White and green with the department's arms in the center.

== Peru ==
=== Departments ===
Amazonas

Ancash

Apurímac

Arequipa

Ayacucho

Cajamarca

Callao

Cuzco

Huancavelica

Huánuco

Junín

La Libertad

Lambayeque

Lima

Lima Province

Loreto

Madre de Dios

Moquegua

Pasco

Piura

Puno

San Martín

Tacna

Tumbes

Ucayali

=== Provinces ===
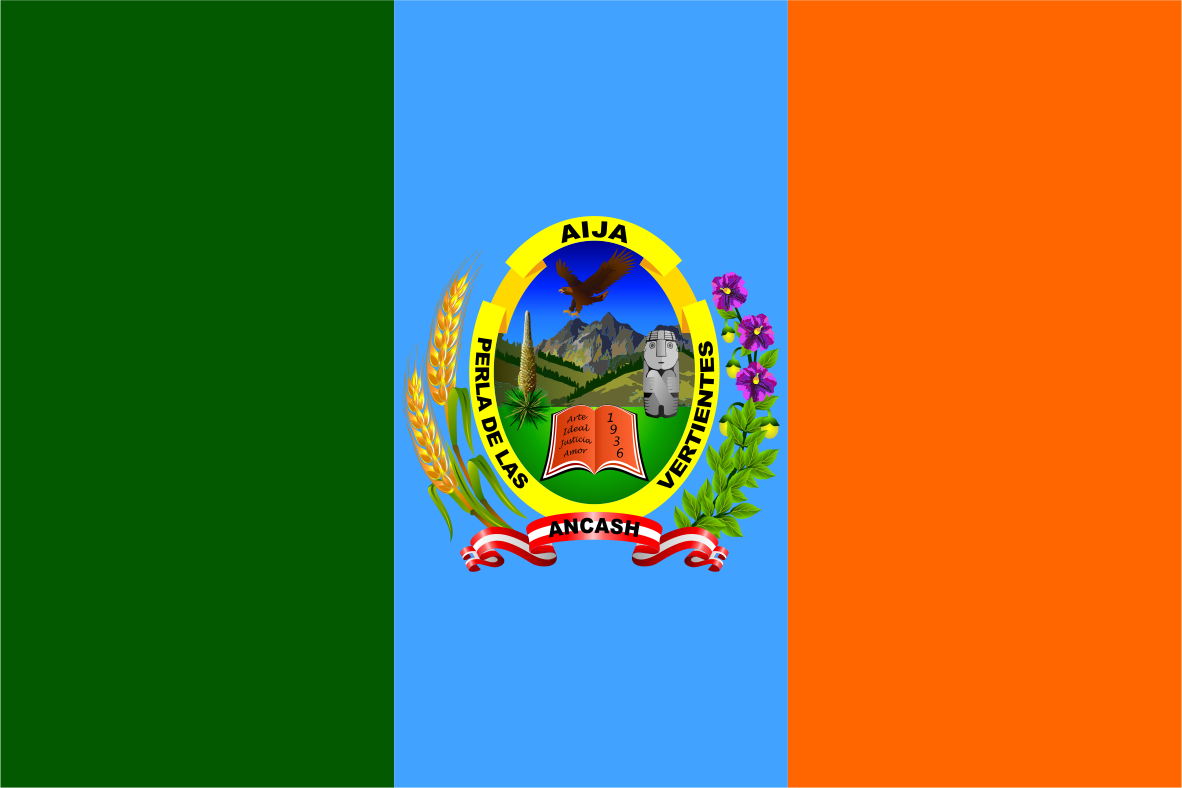
Aija

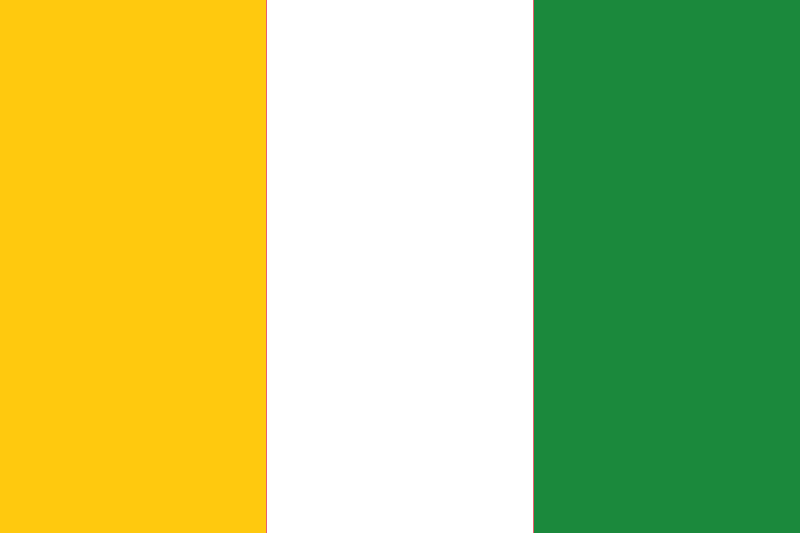
Alto Amazonas

Andahuaylas

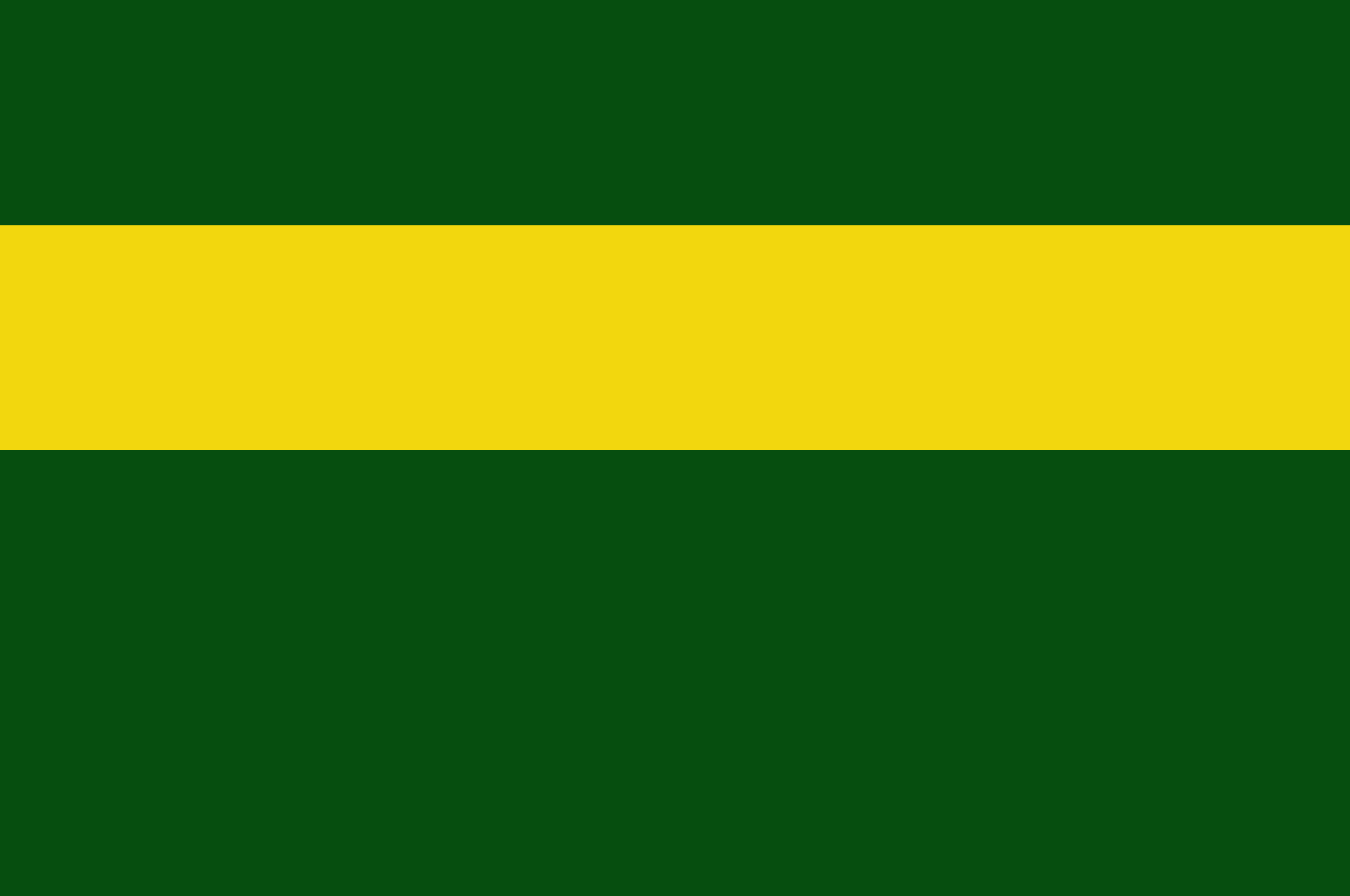
Anta

Arequipa

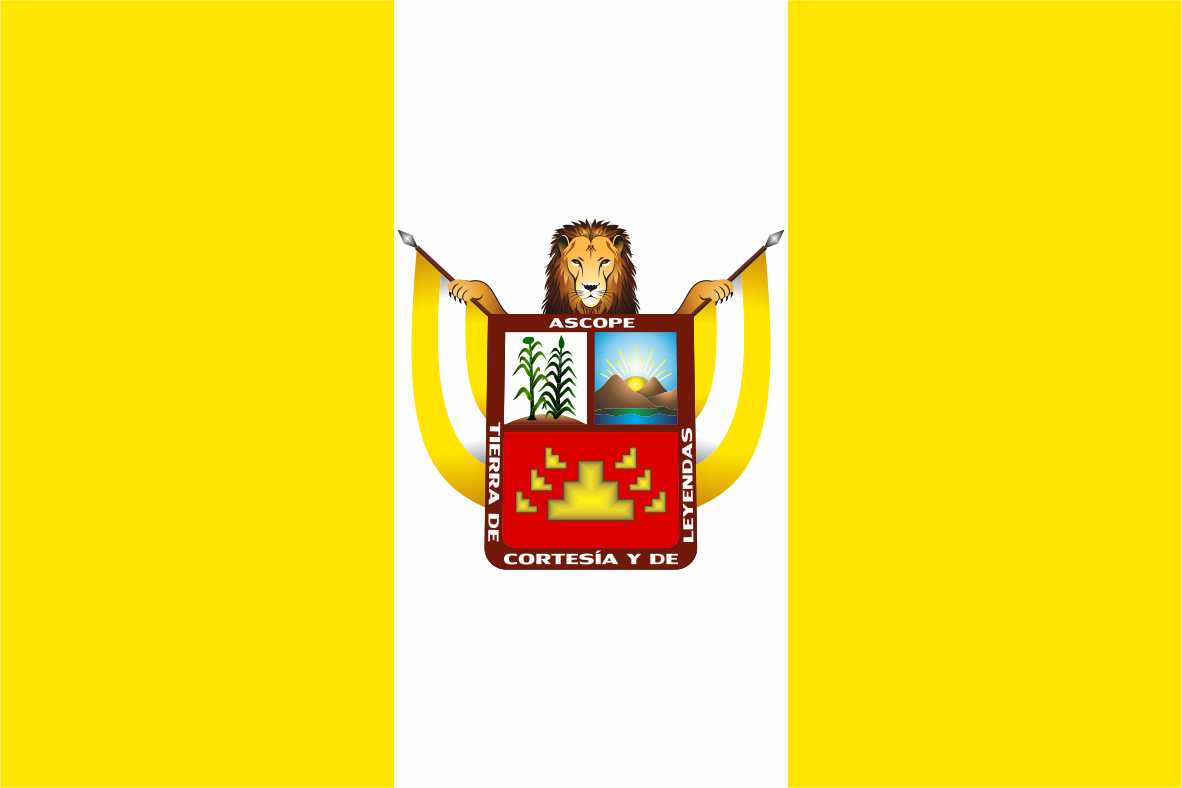
Ascope

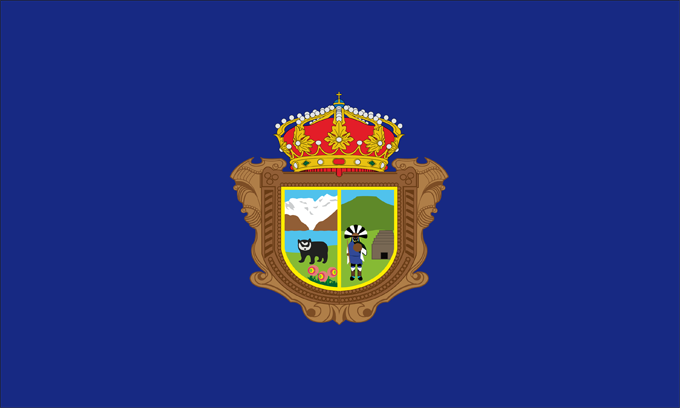
Asunción

Ayabaca

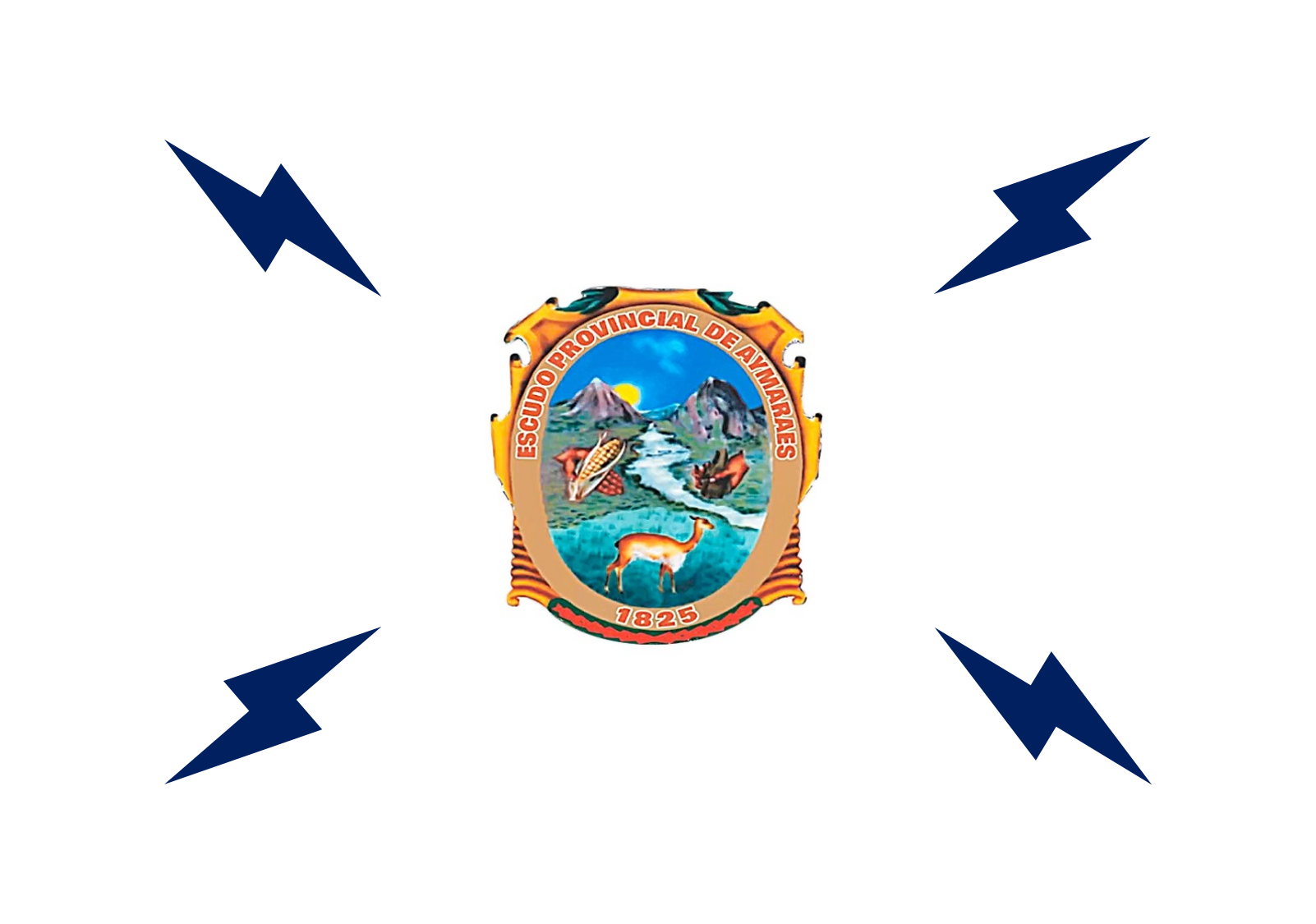
Aymaraes

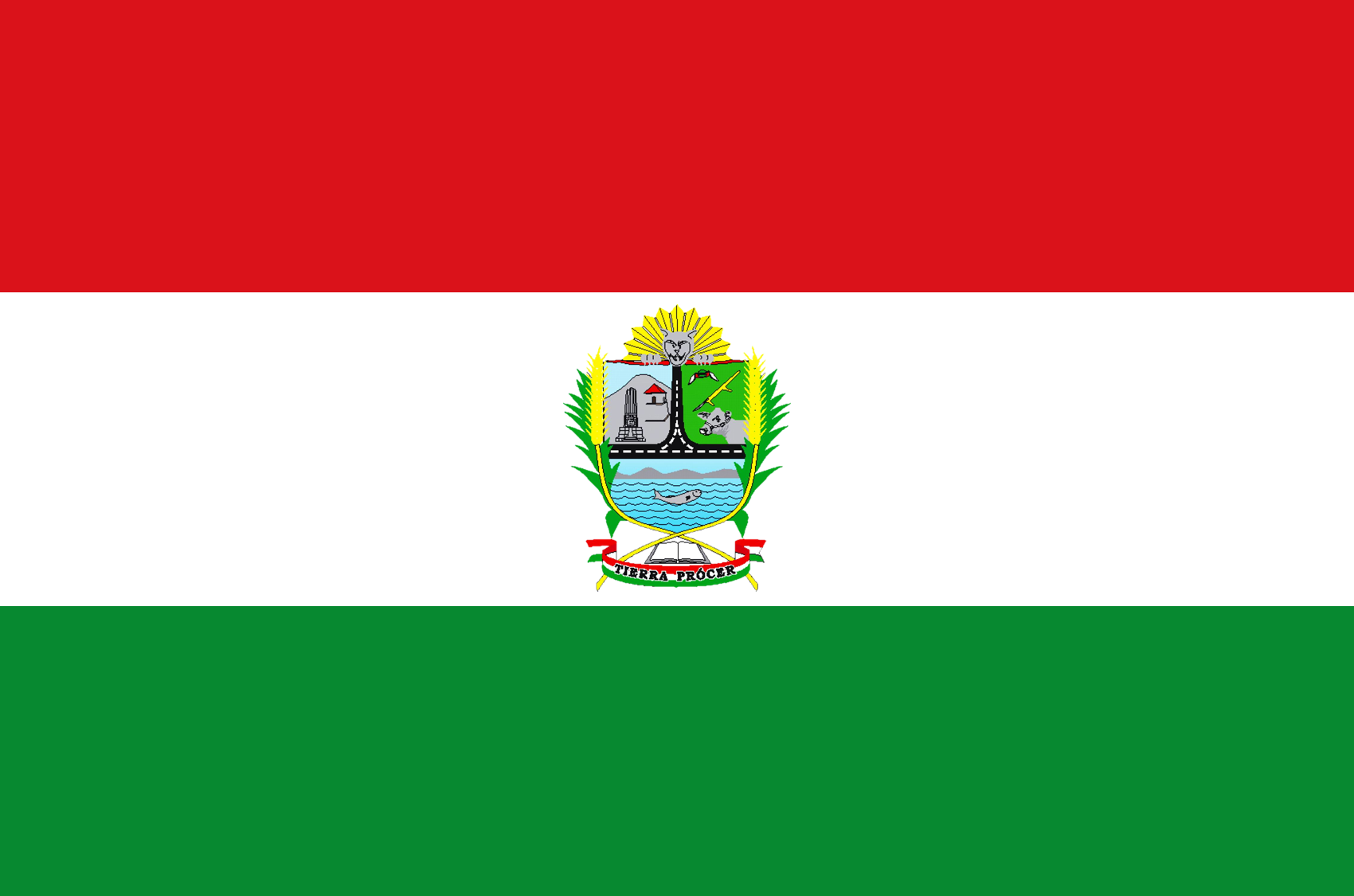
Azángaro

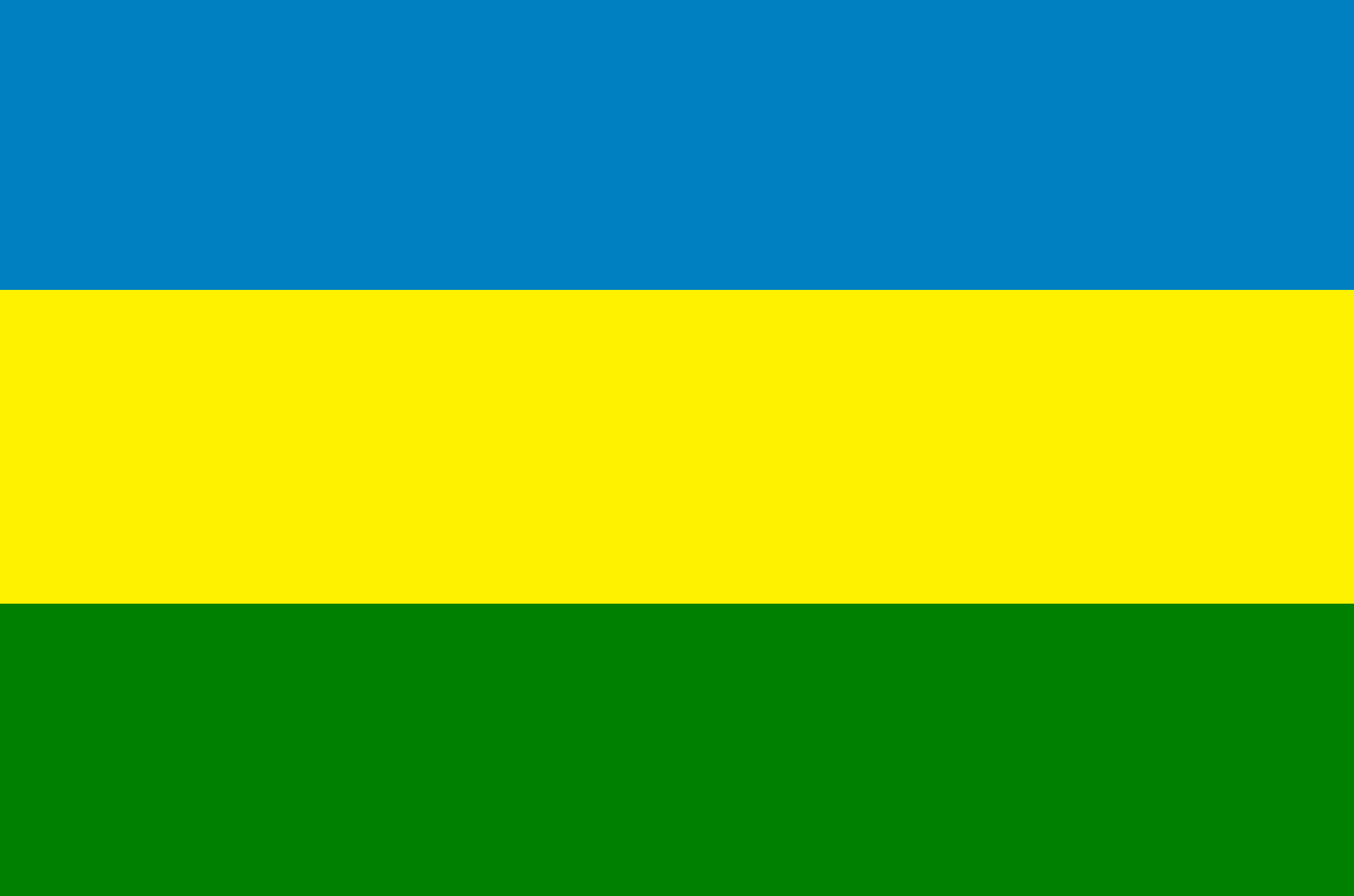
Bagua

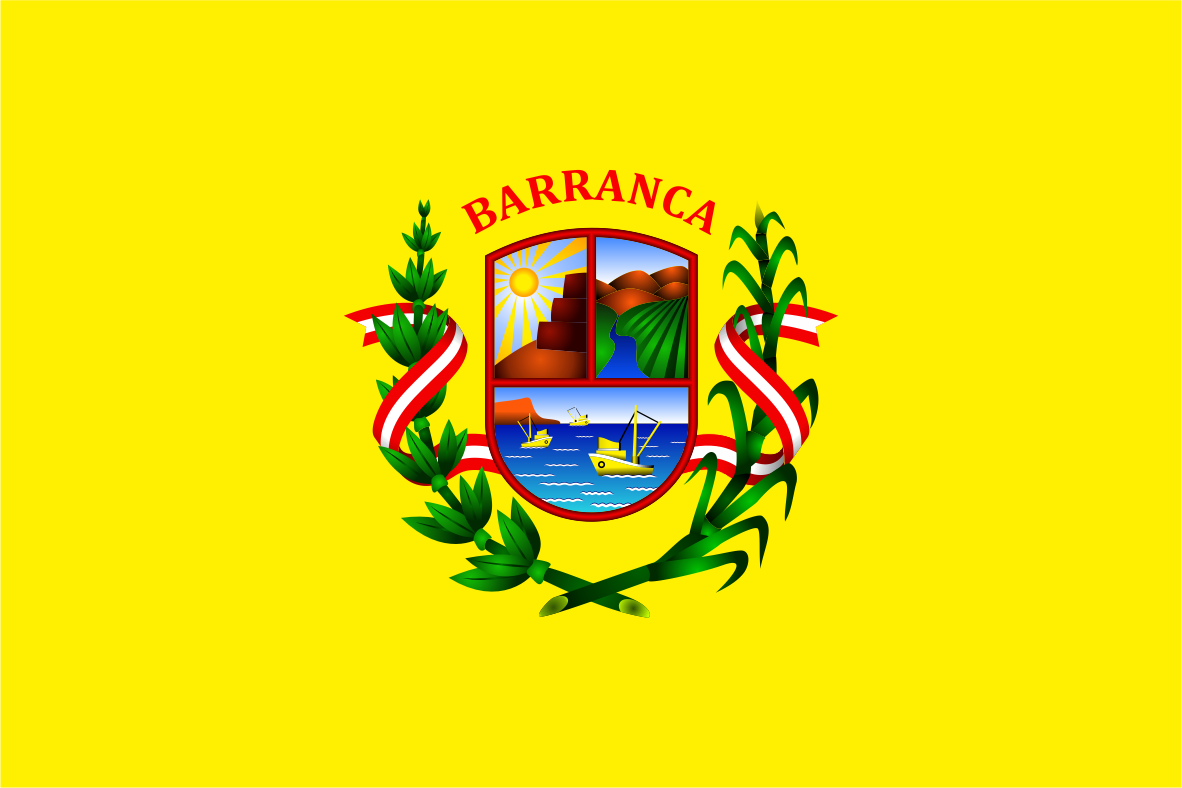
Barranca

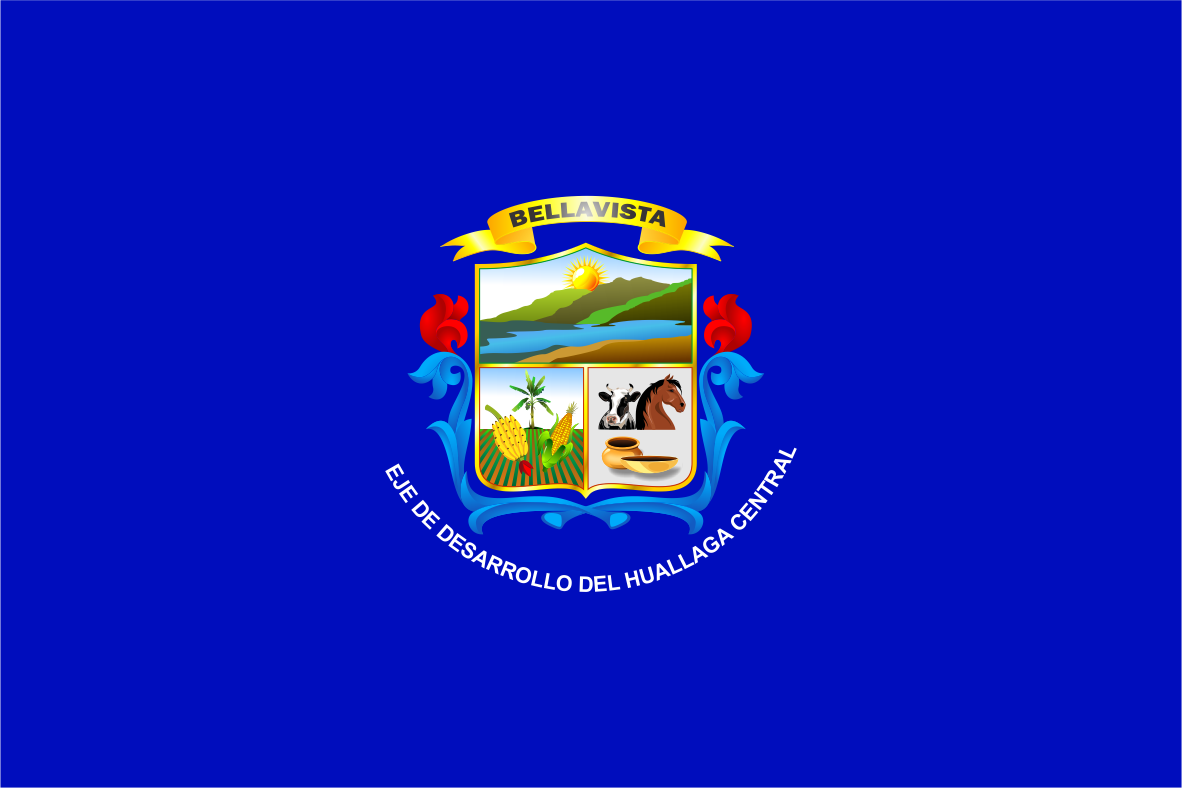
Bellavista

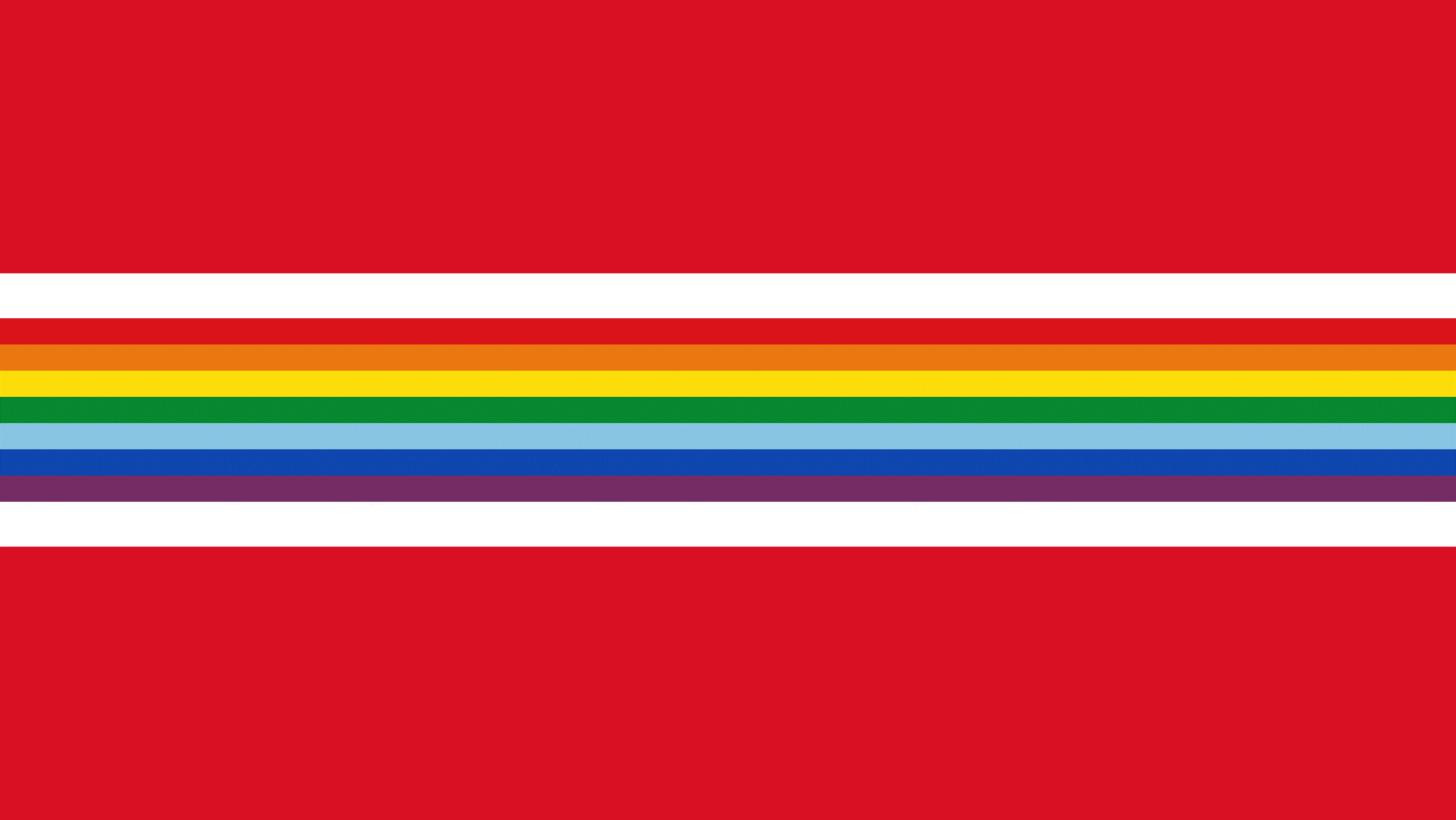
Canas

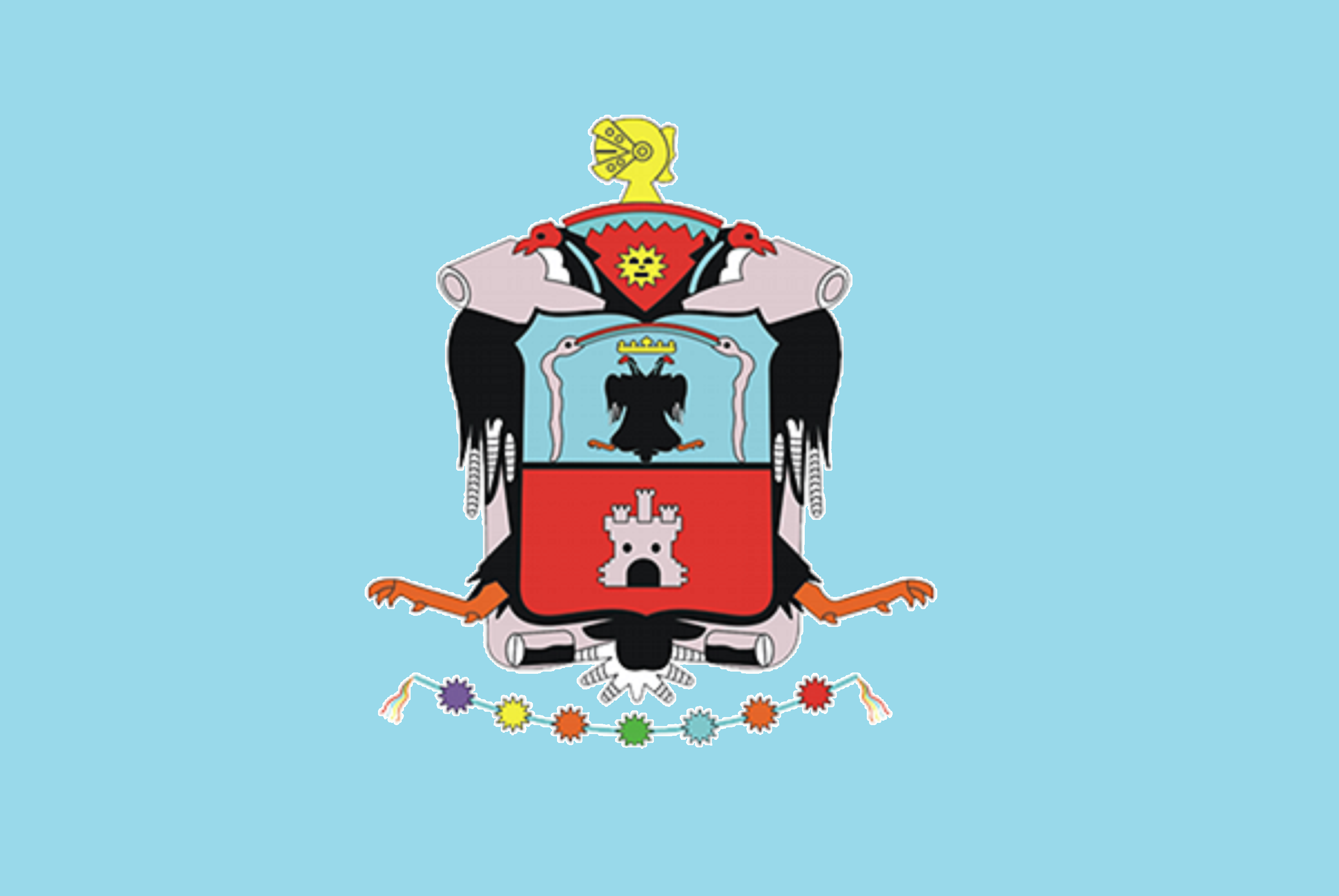
Canchis Province

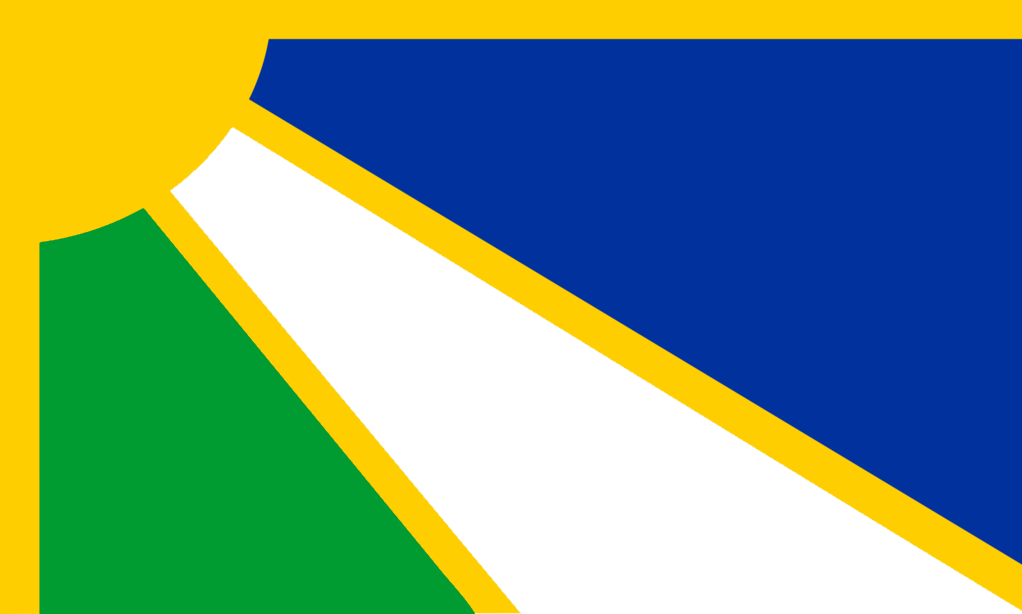
Bolívar

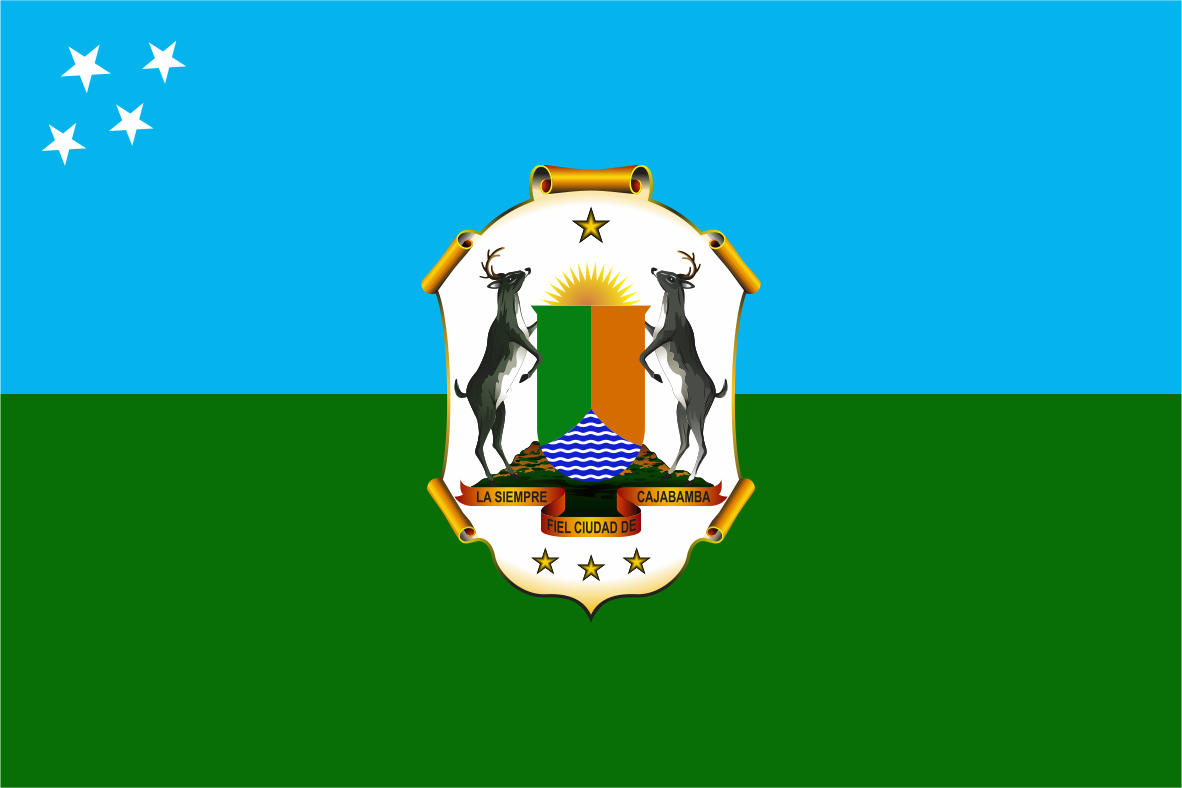
Cajabamba

Cajamarca

Callao

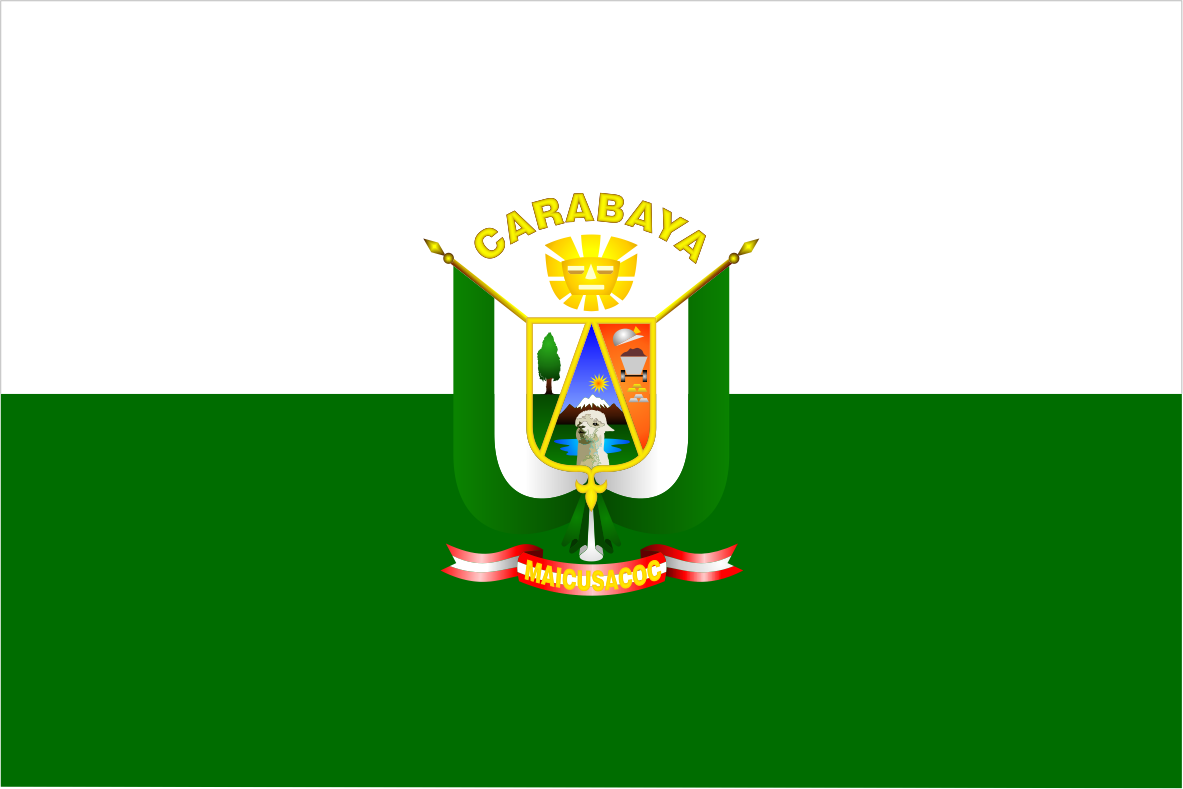
Carabaya

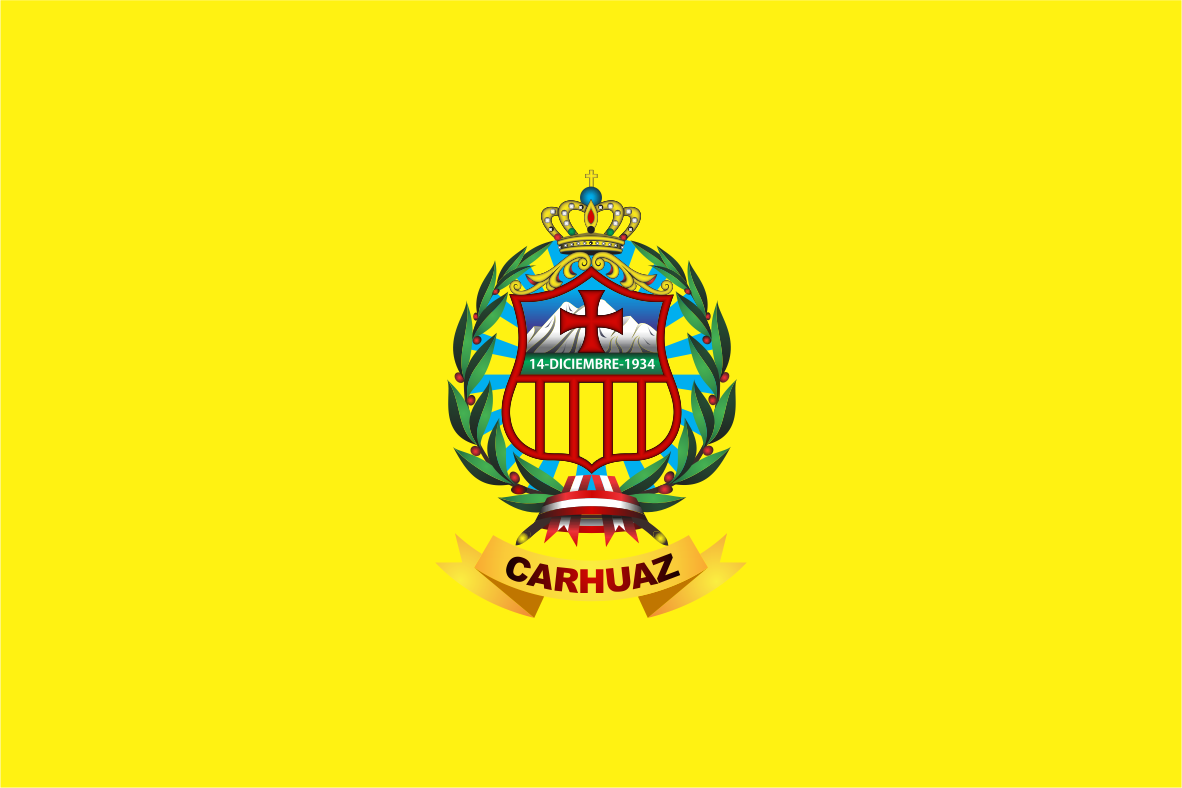
Carhuaz

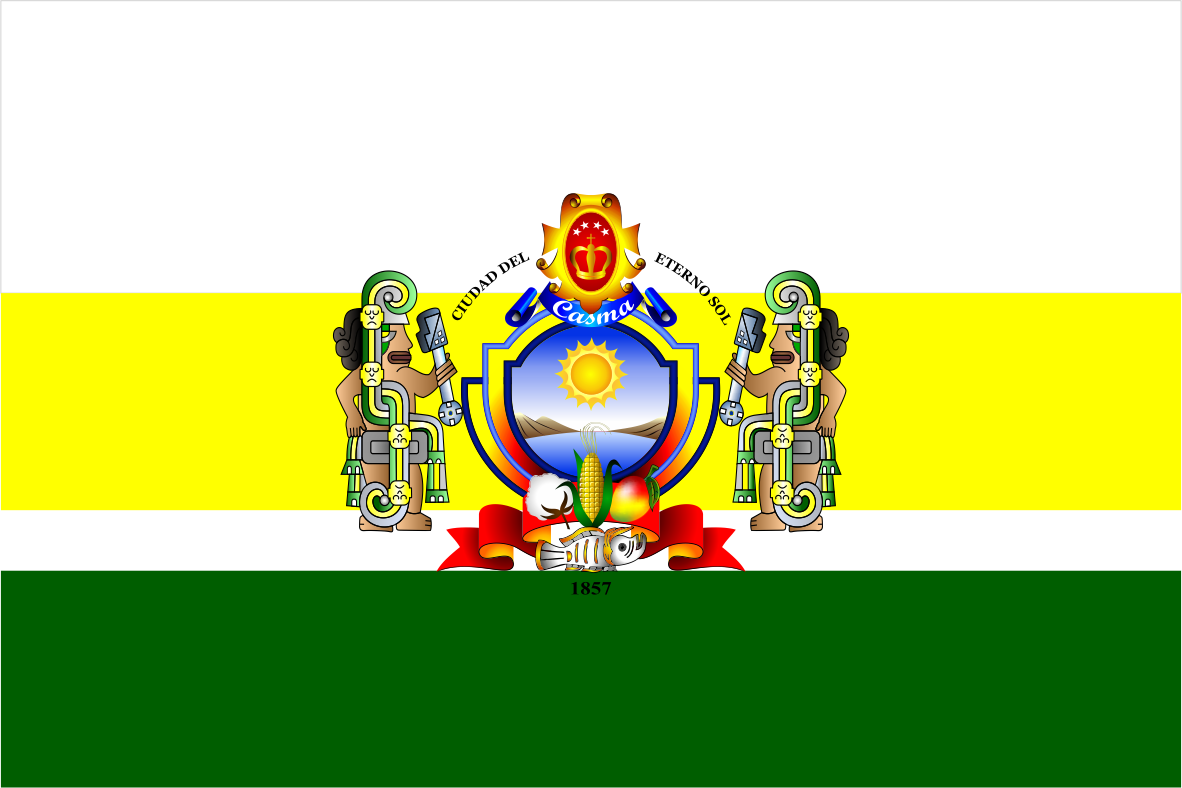
Casma

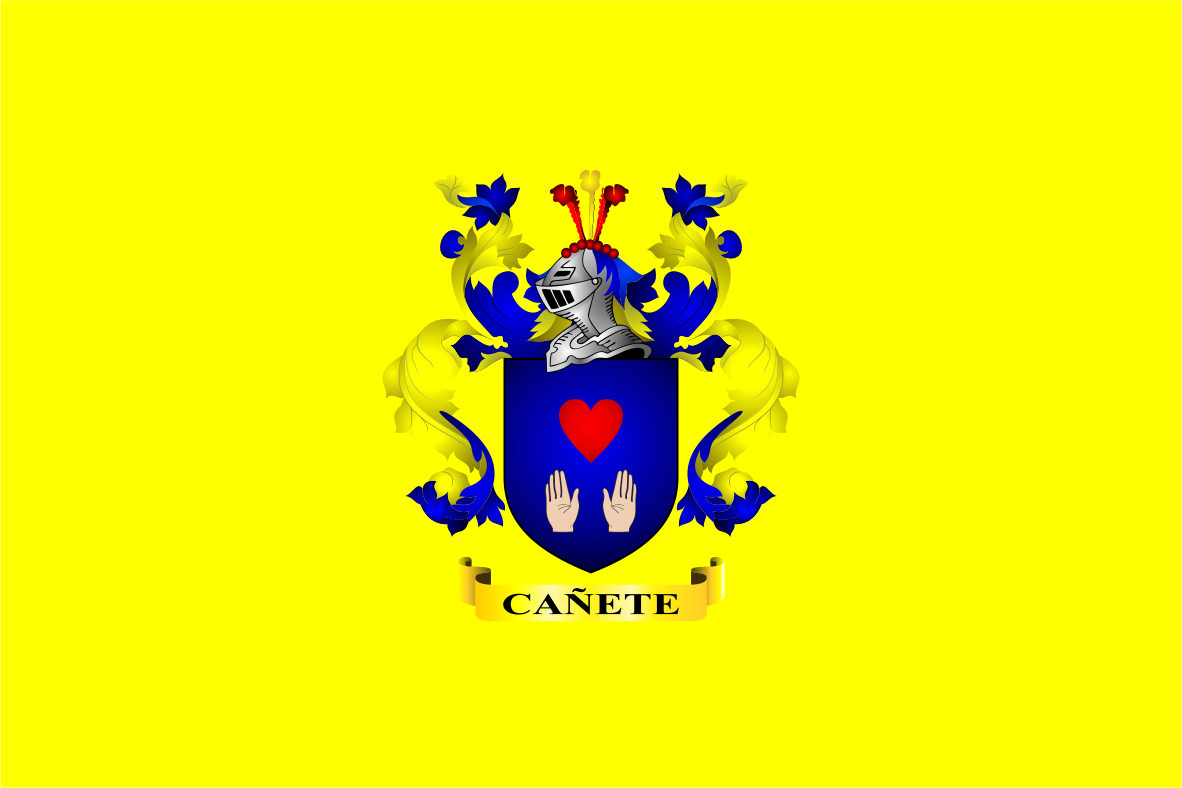
Cañete

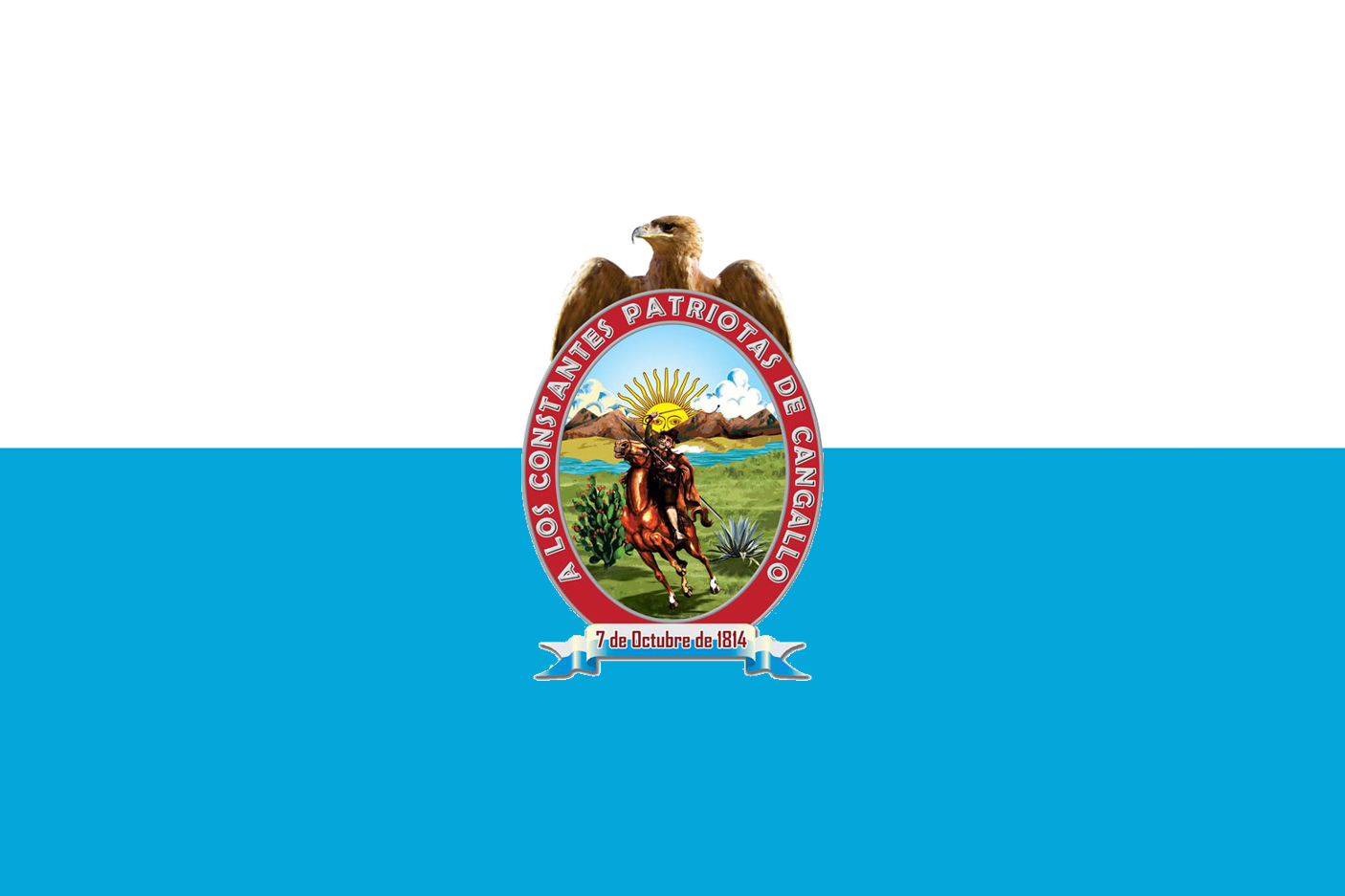
Cangallo

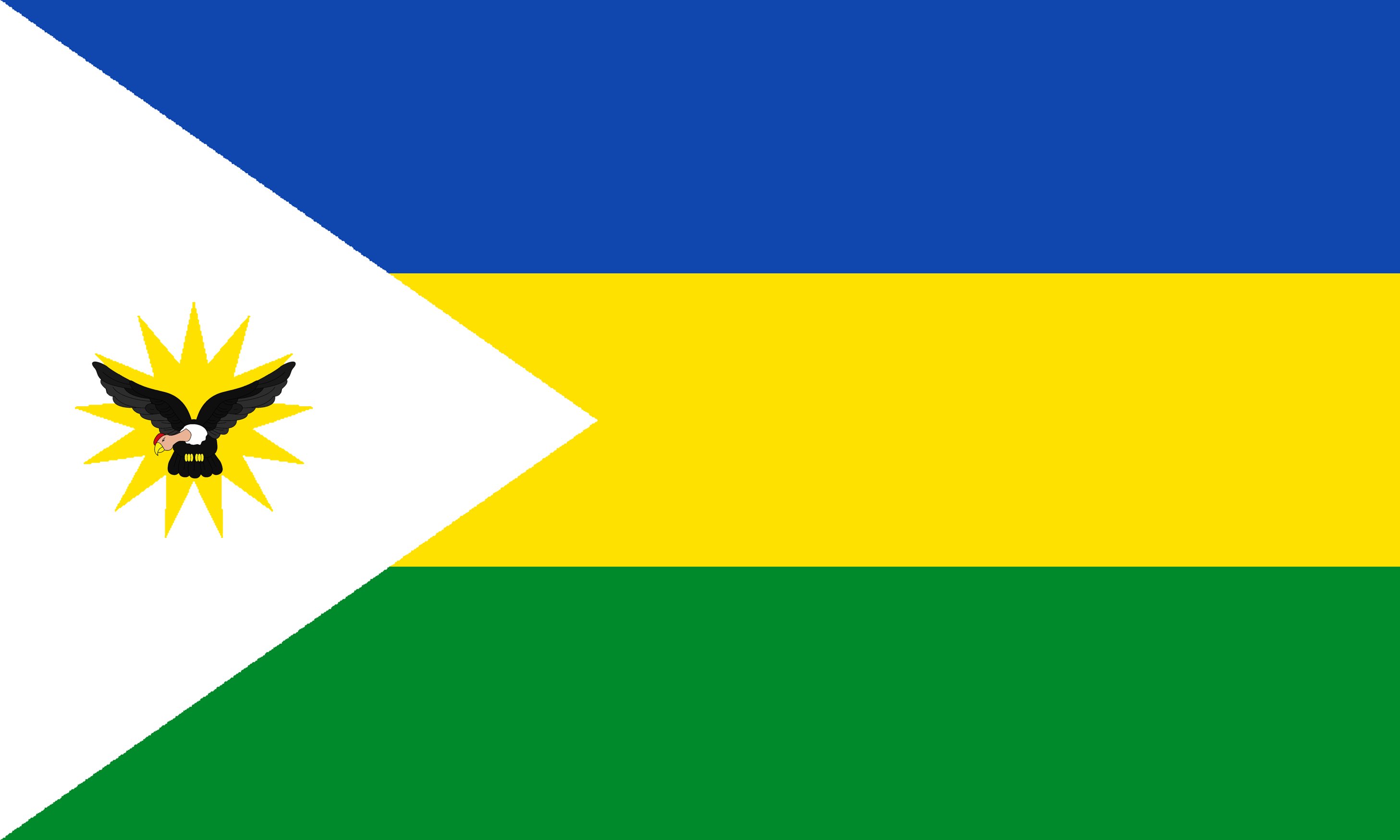
Candarave

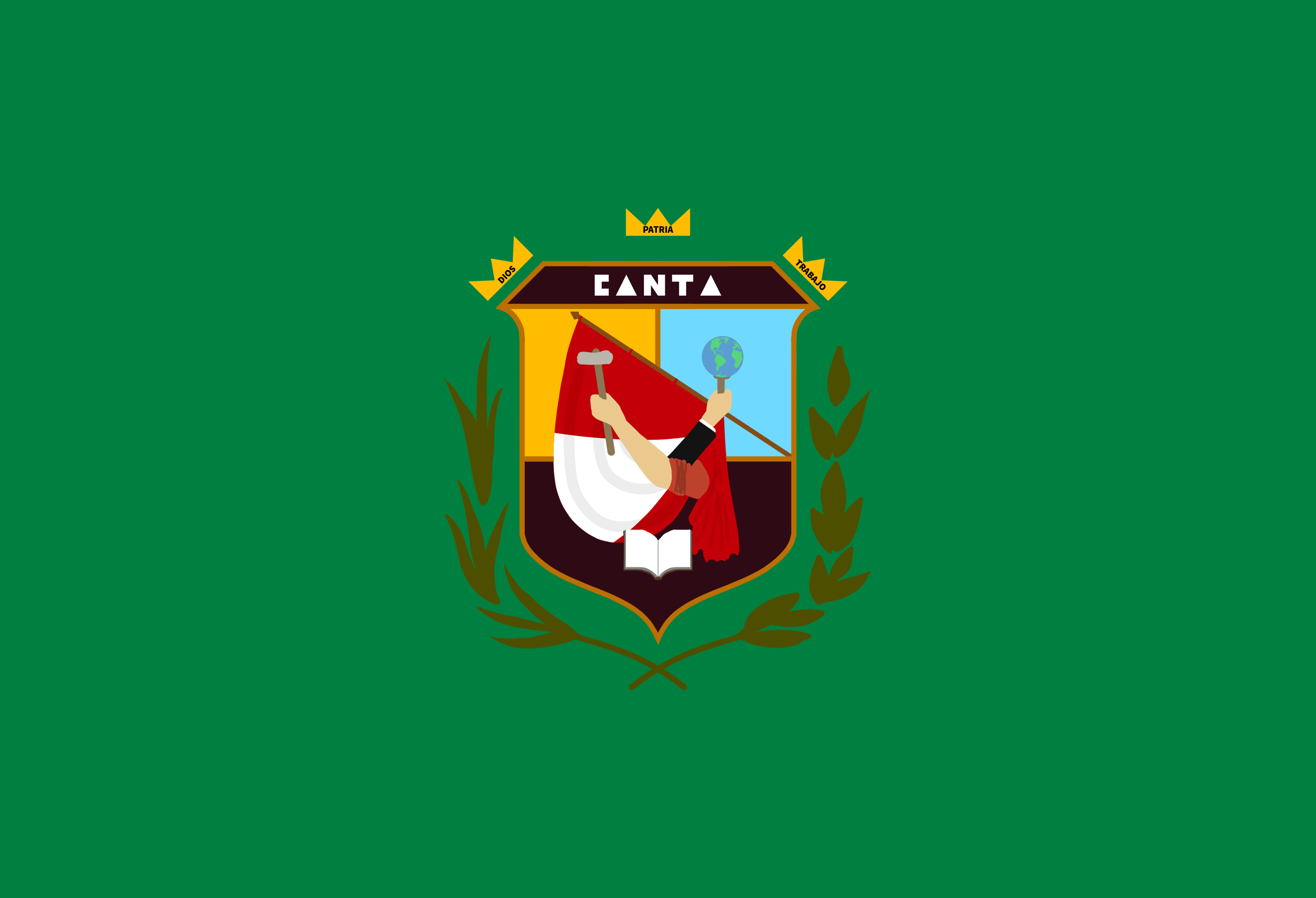
Canta

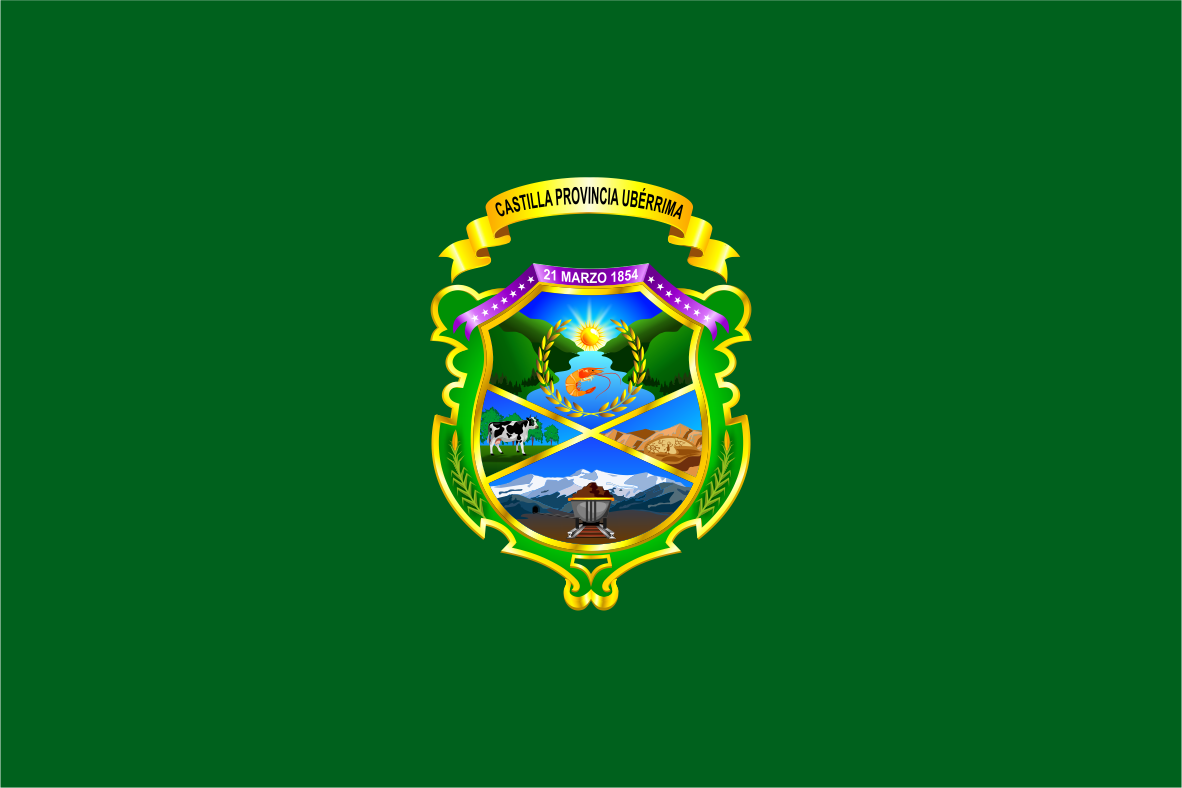
Castilla

Carlos Fermín Fitzcarrald

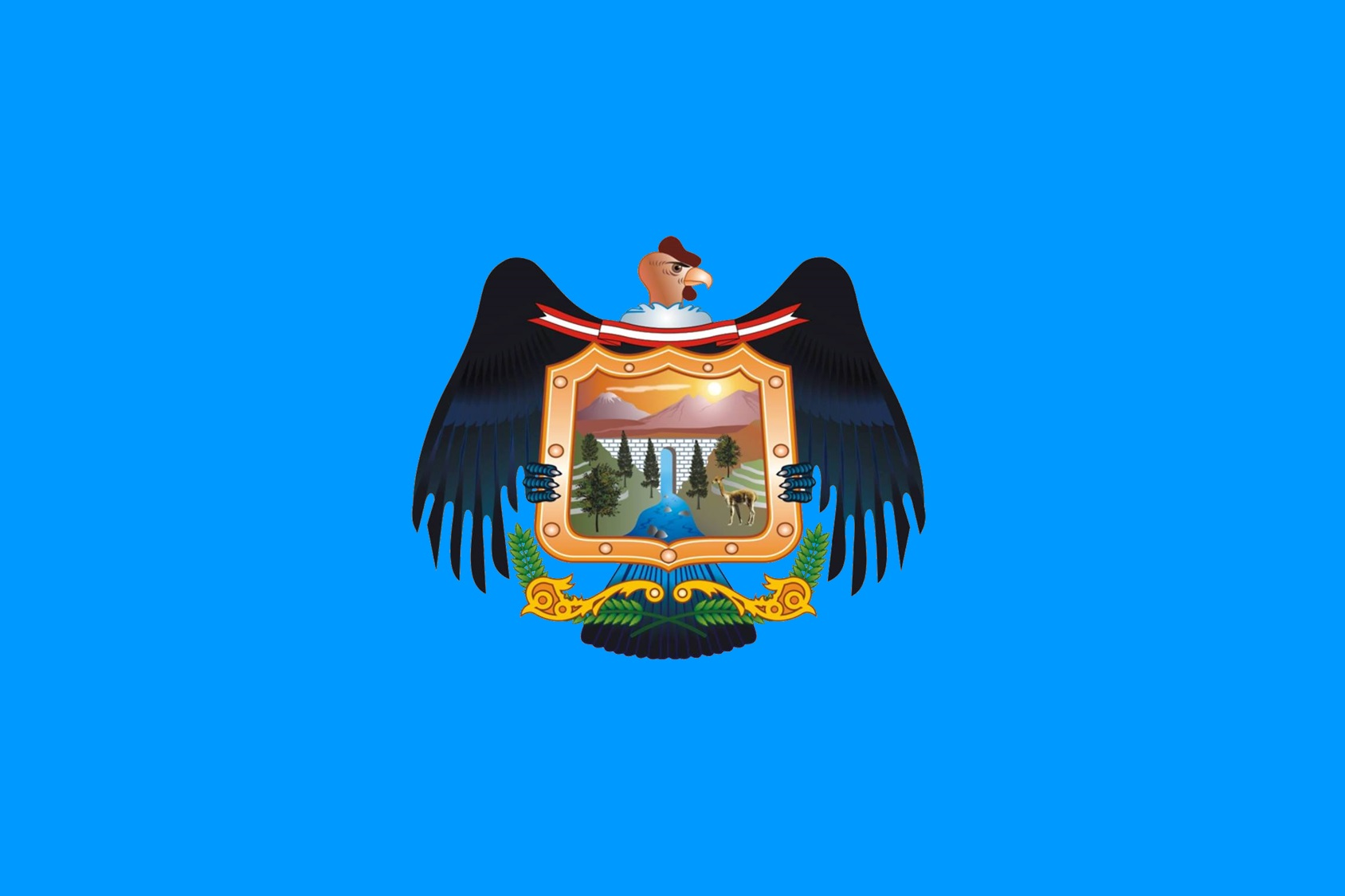
Caylloma

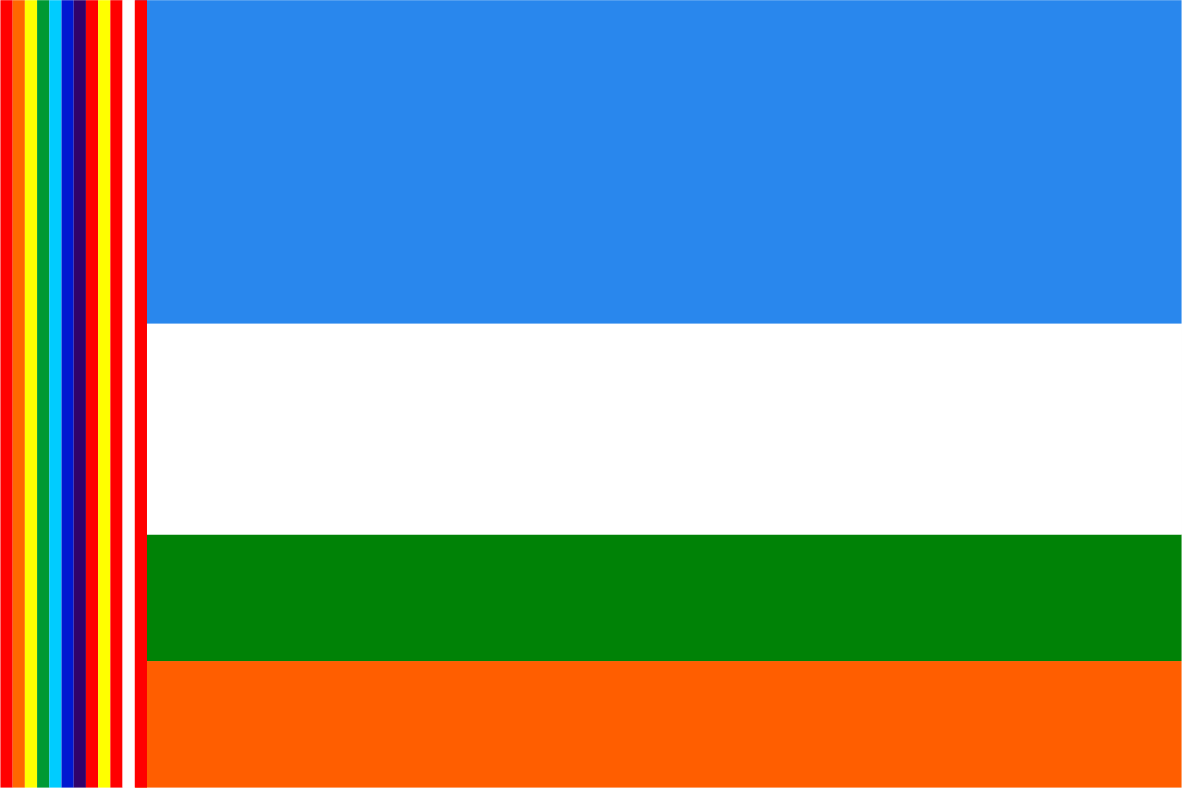
Celendín

Chanchamayo

Chachapoyas

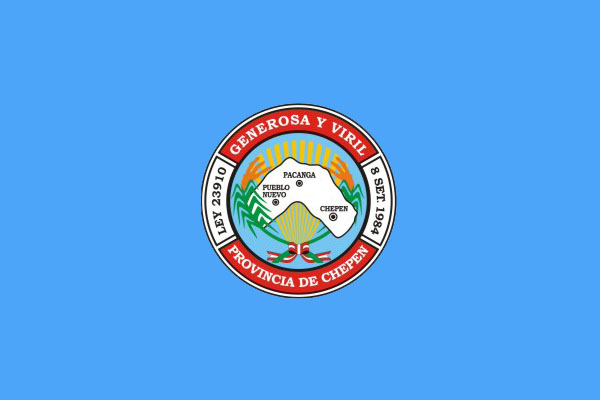
Chepén

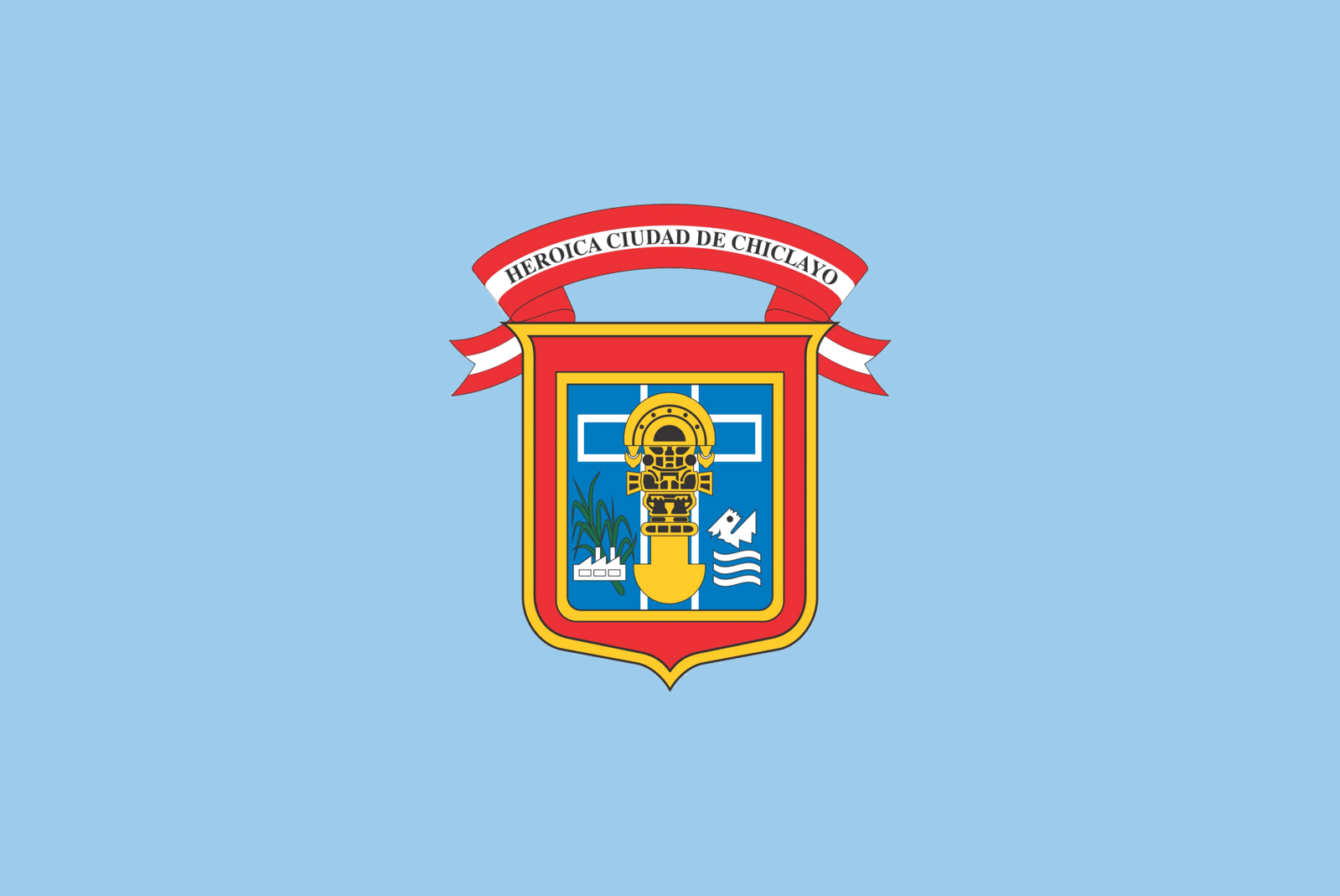
Chiclayo

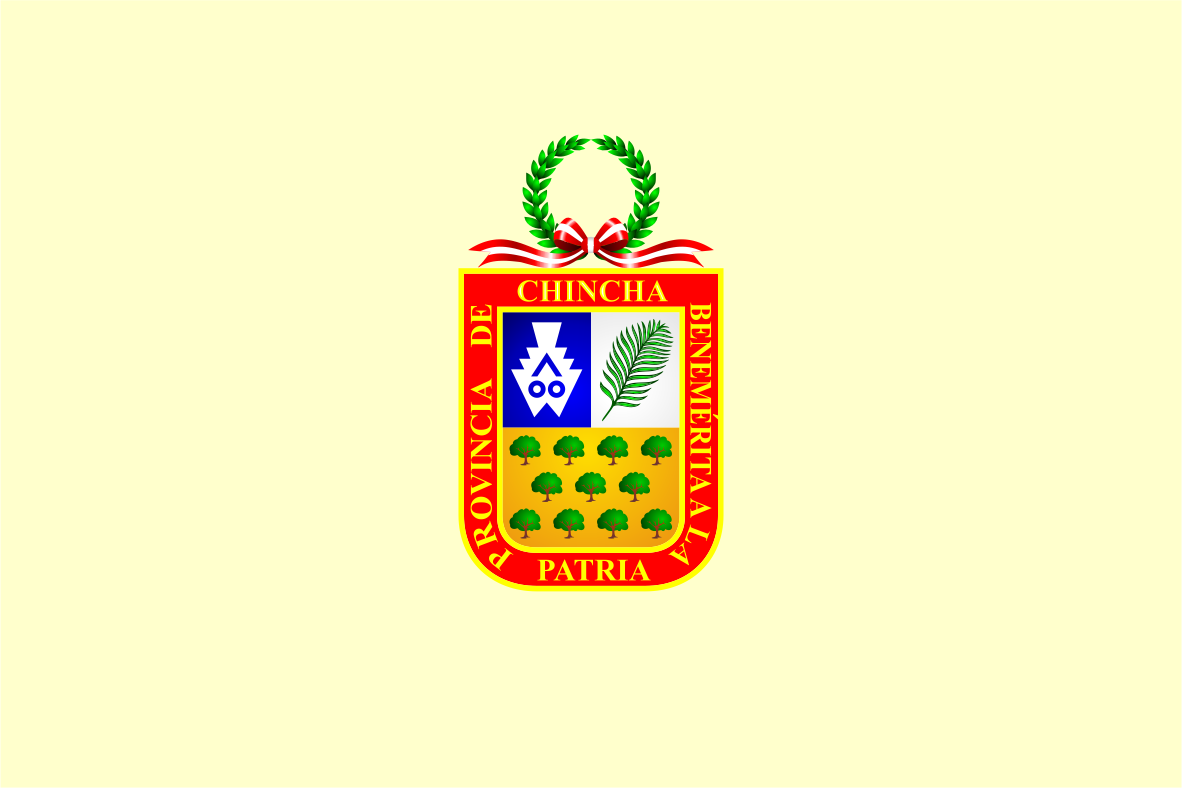
Chincha

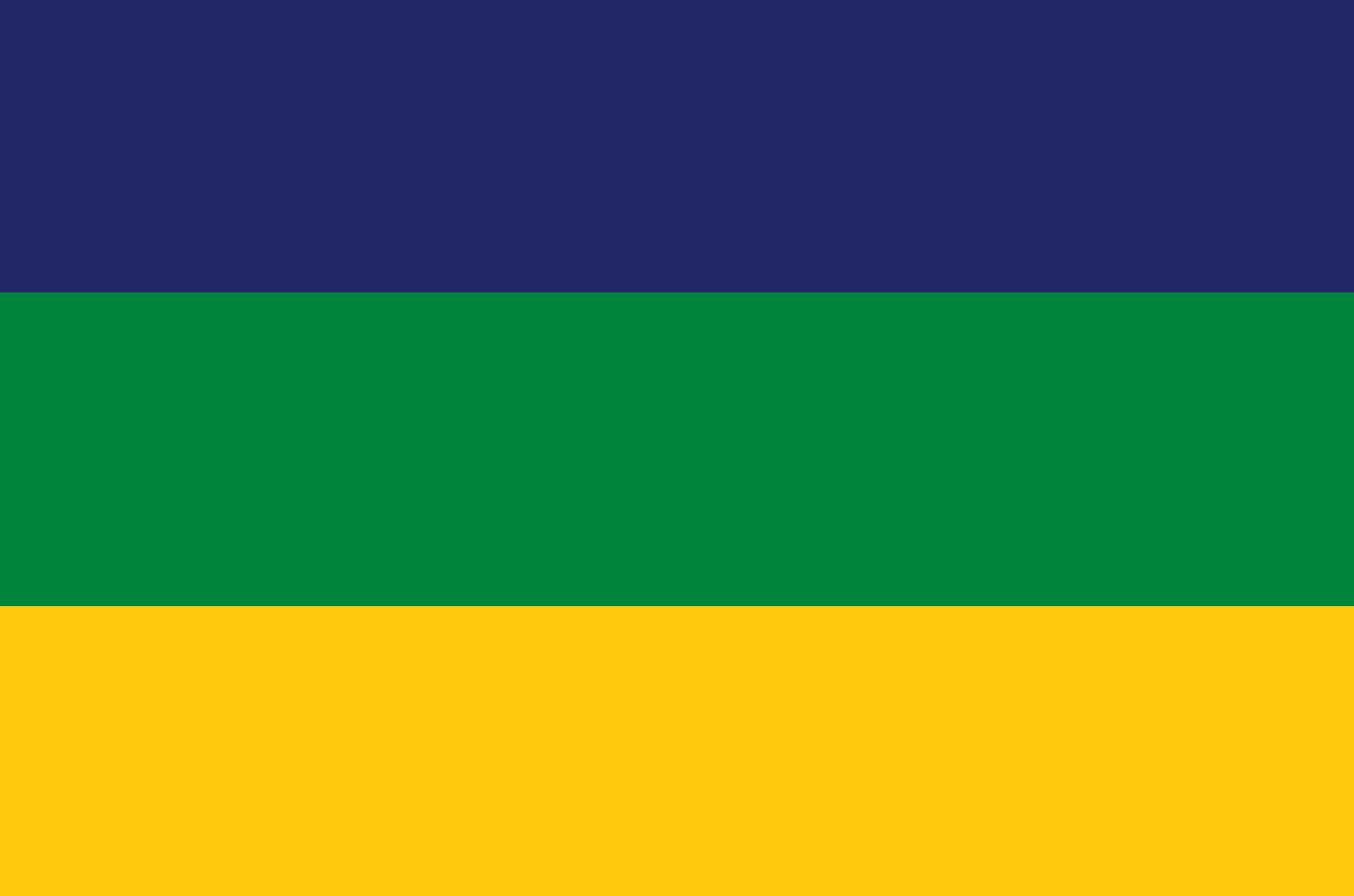
Chincheros

Condorcanqui

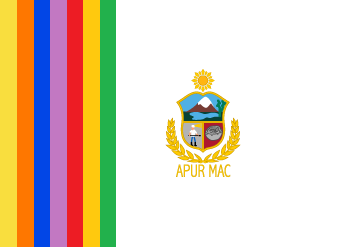
Cotabambas

Cusco

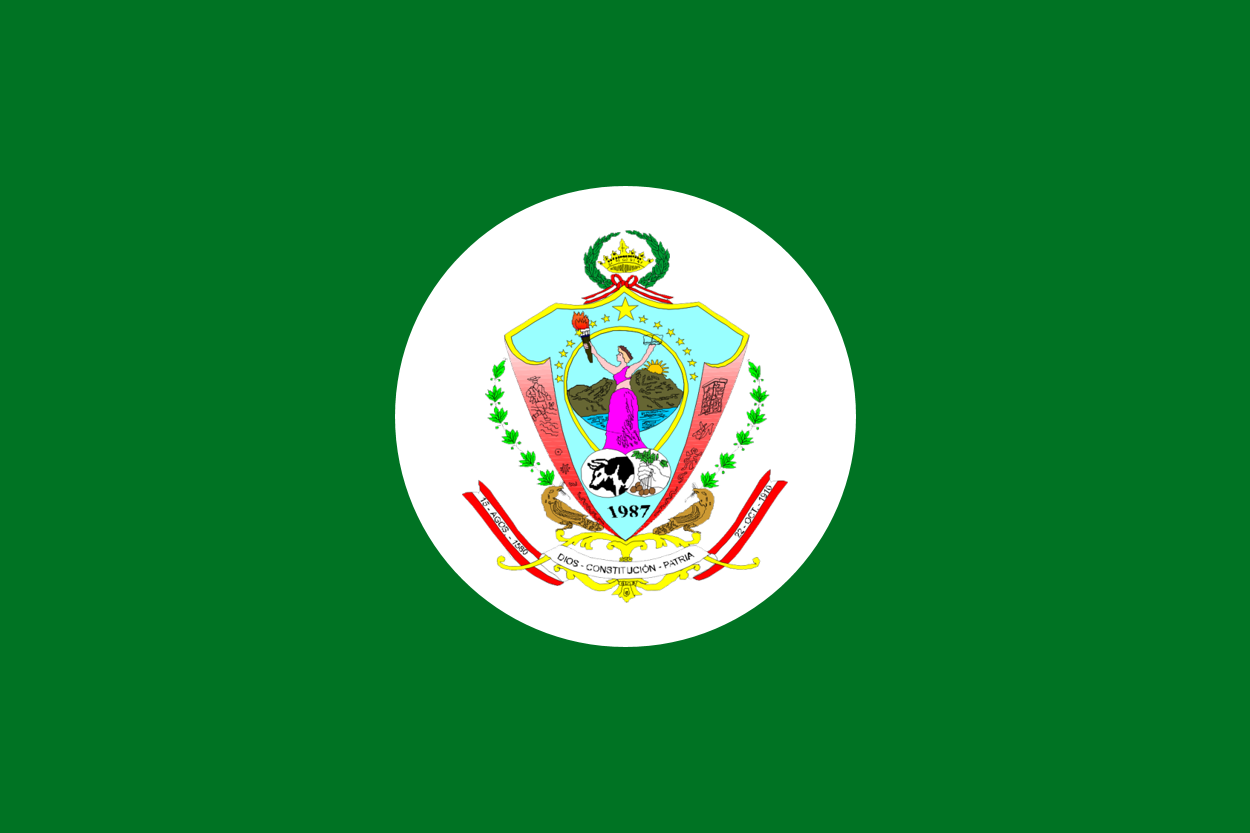
Cutervo

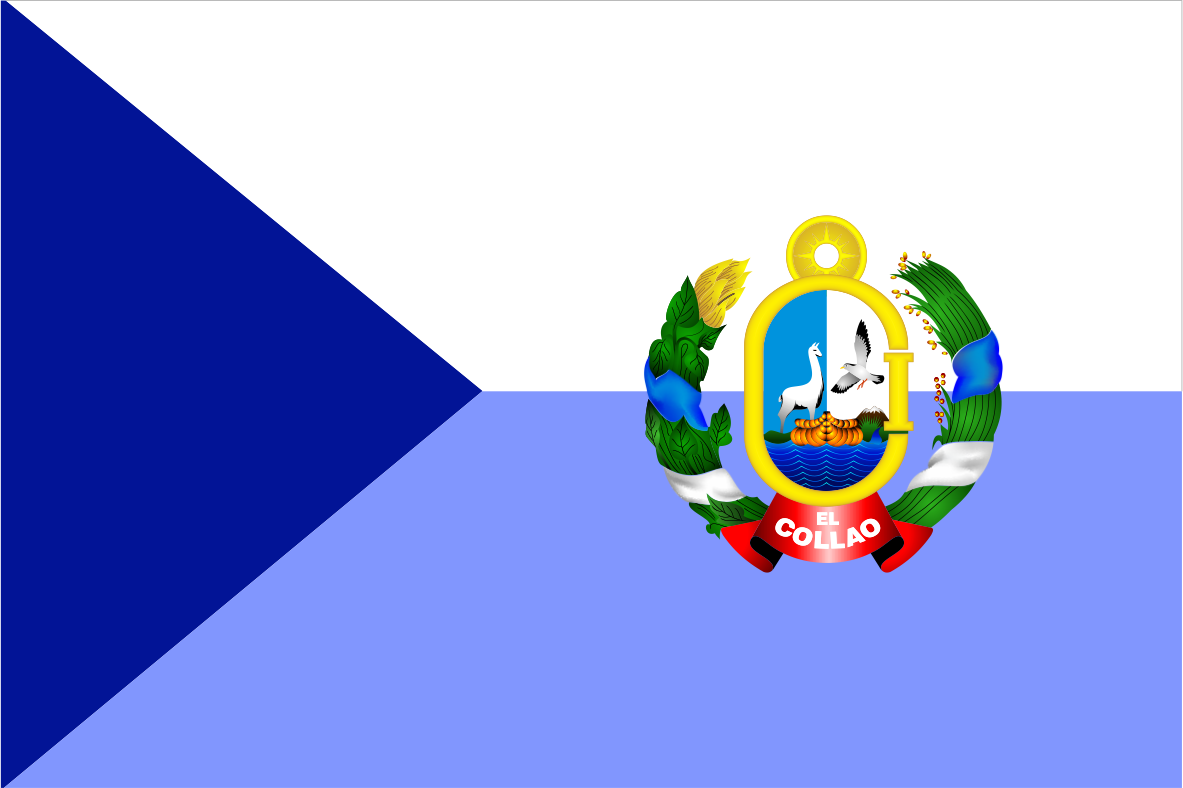
El Collao

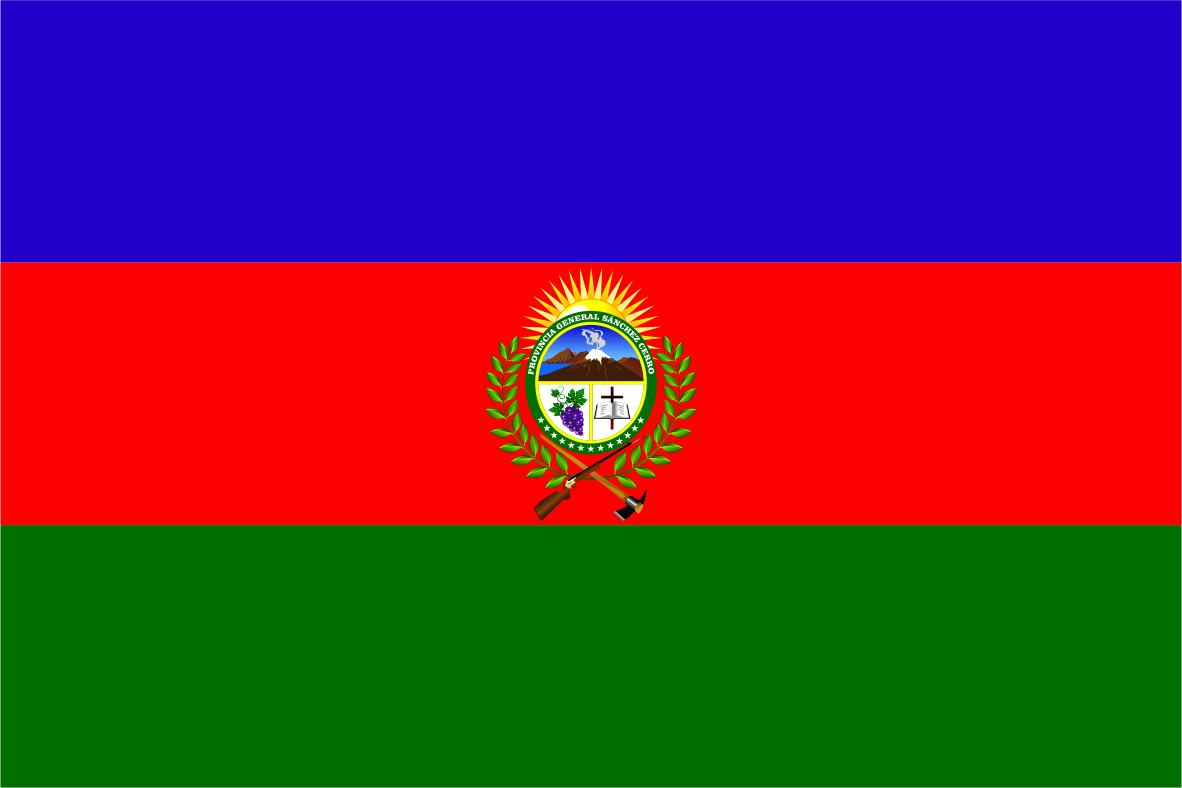
General Sánchez Cerro

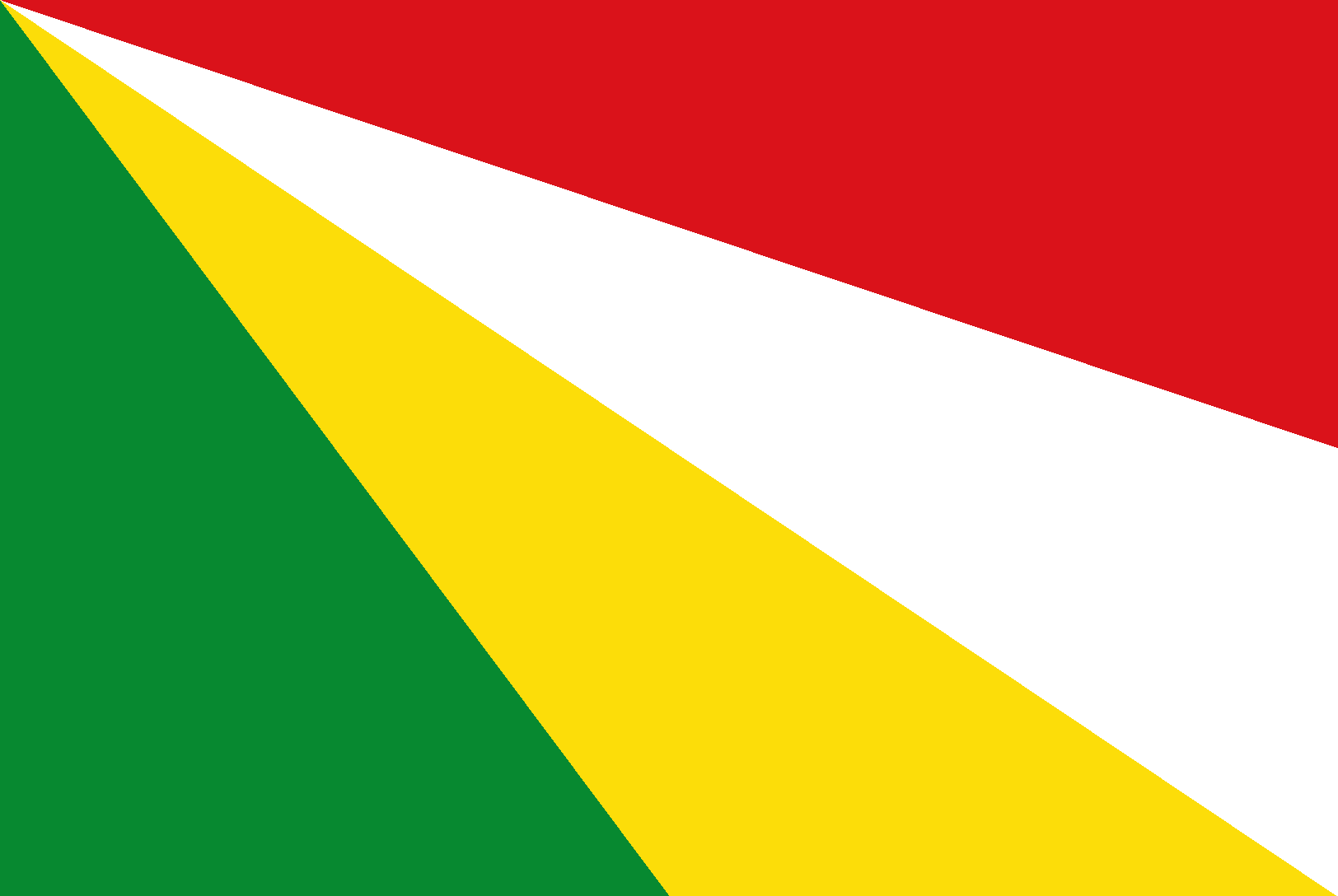
Grau

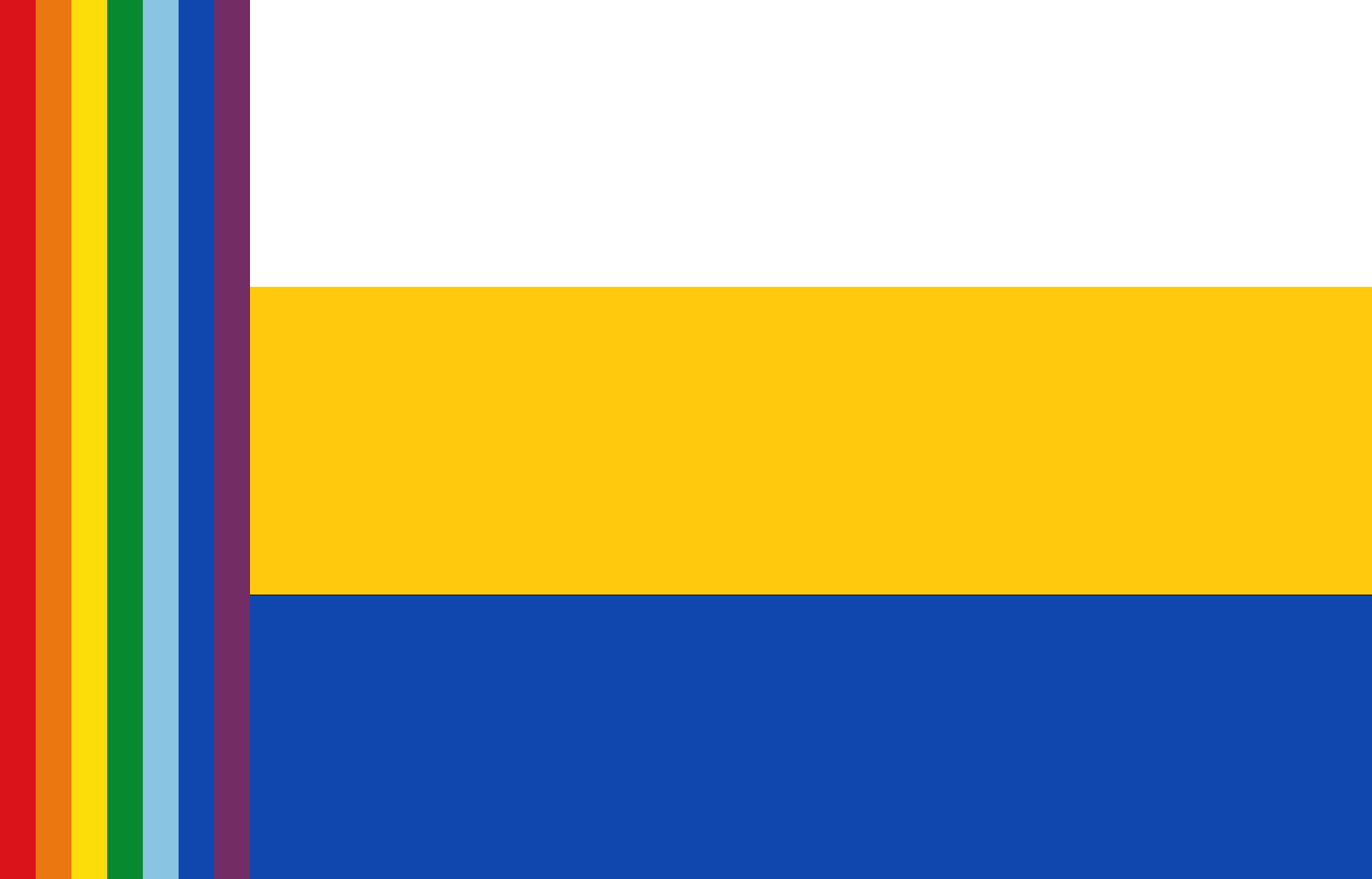
Espinar

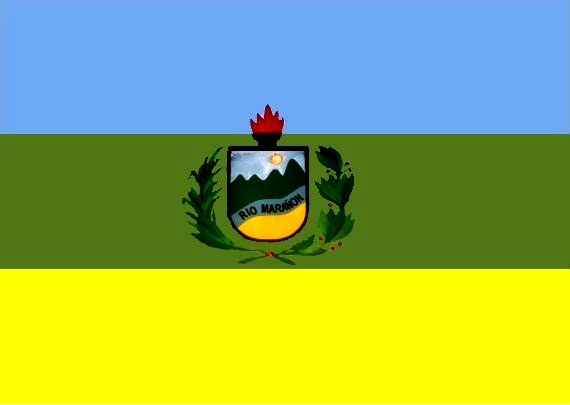
Huacaybamba

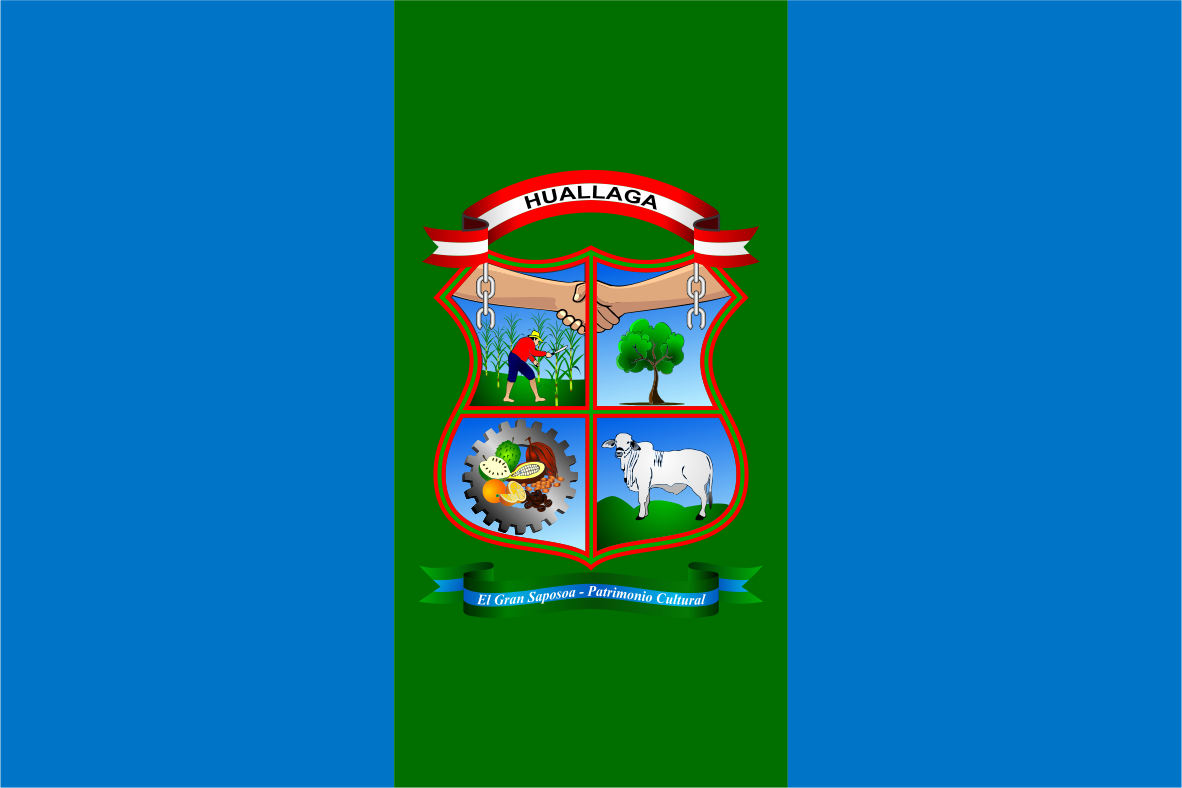
Huallaga

Huamanga

Huanta

Huancavelica

Huancayo

Huánuco

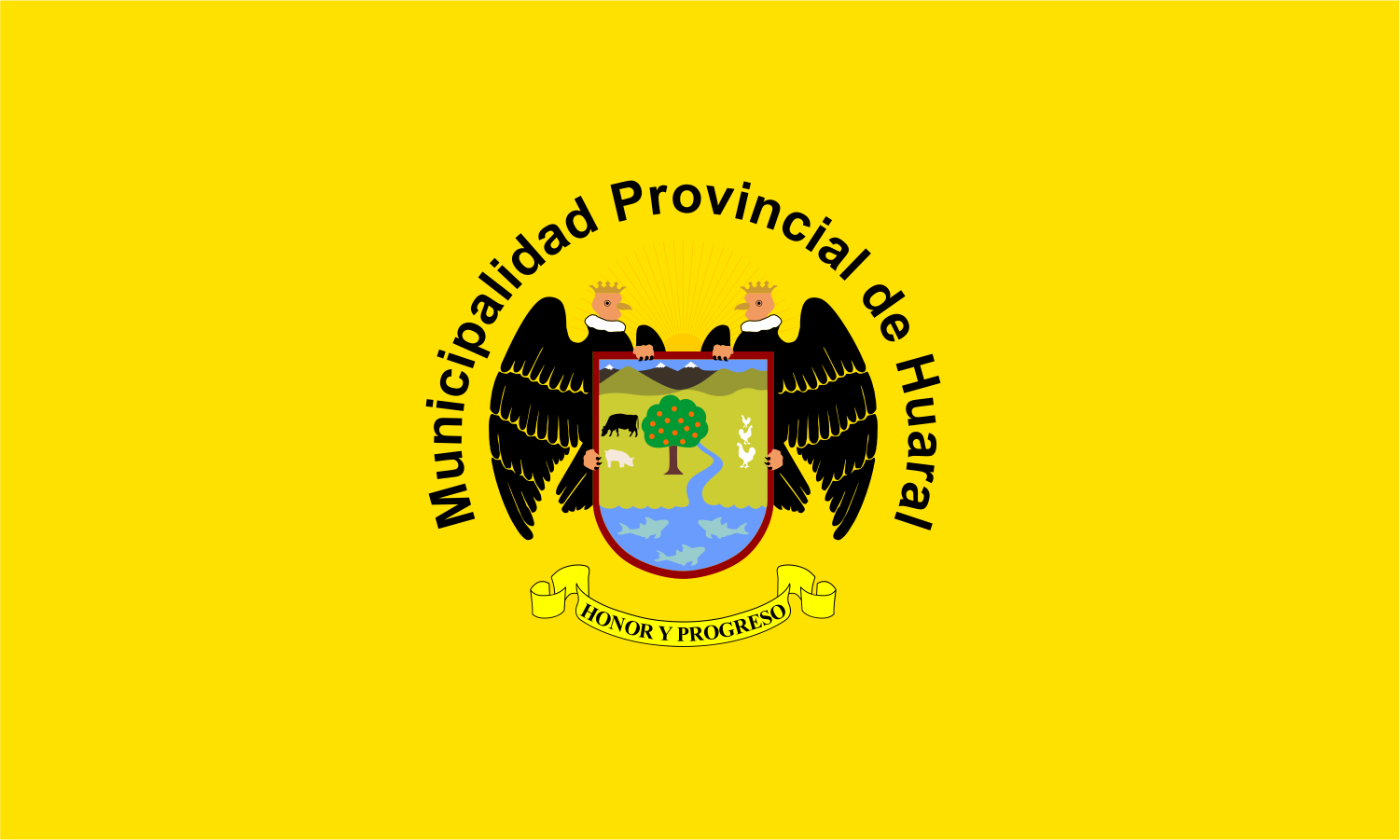
Huaral

Huaraz

Huari

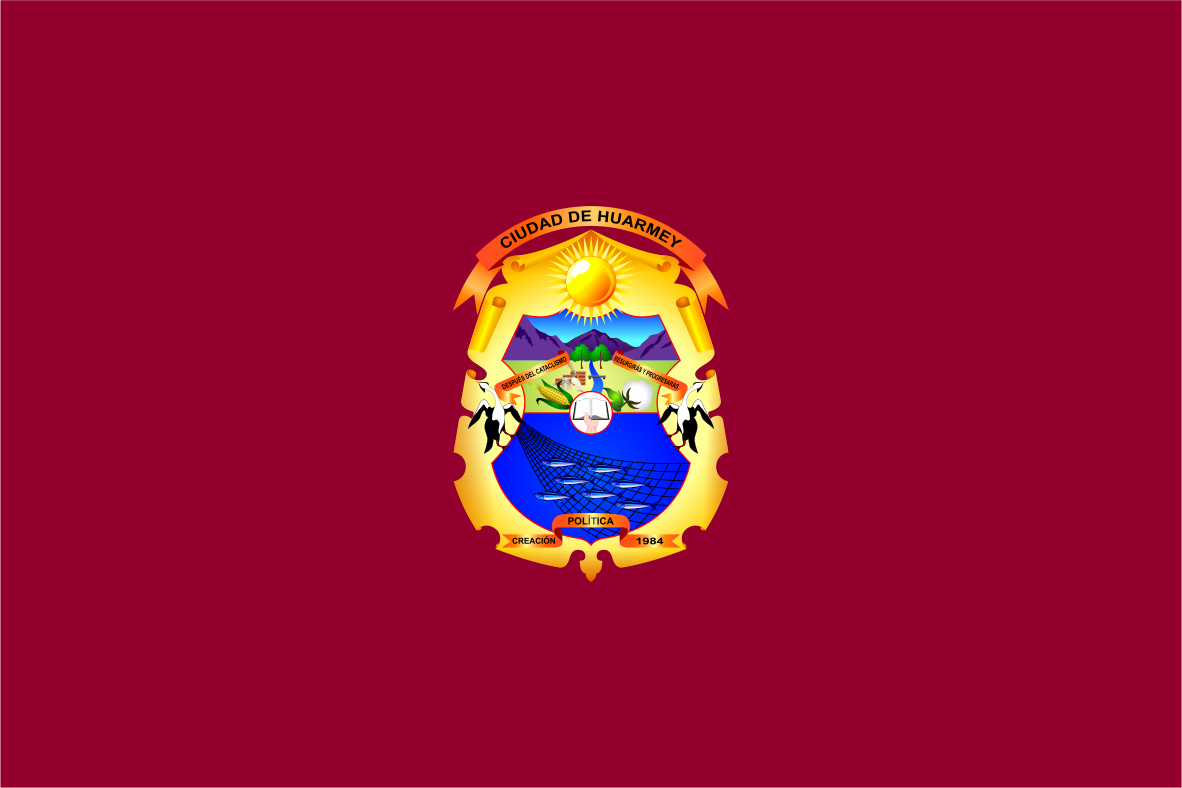
Huarmey

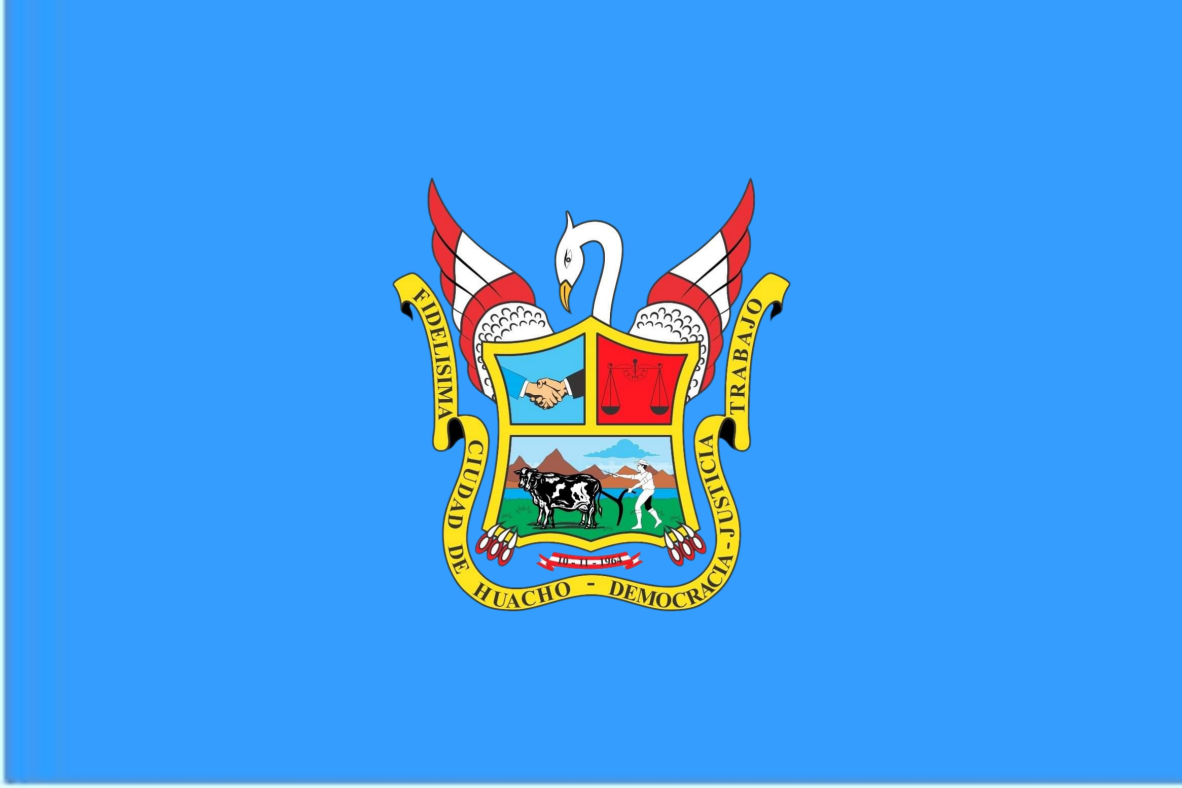
Huaura

Huaylas

Ica

Ilo

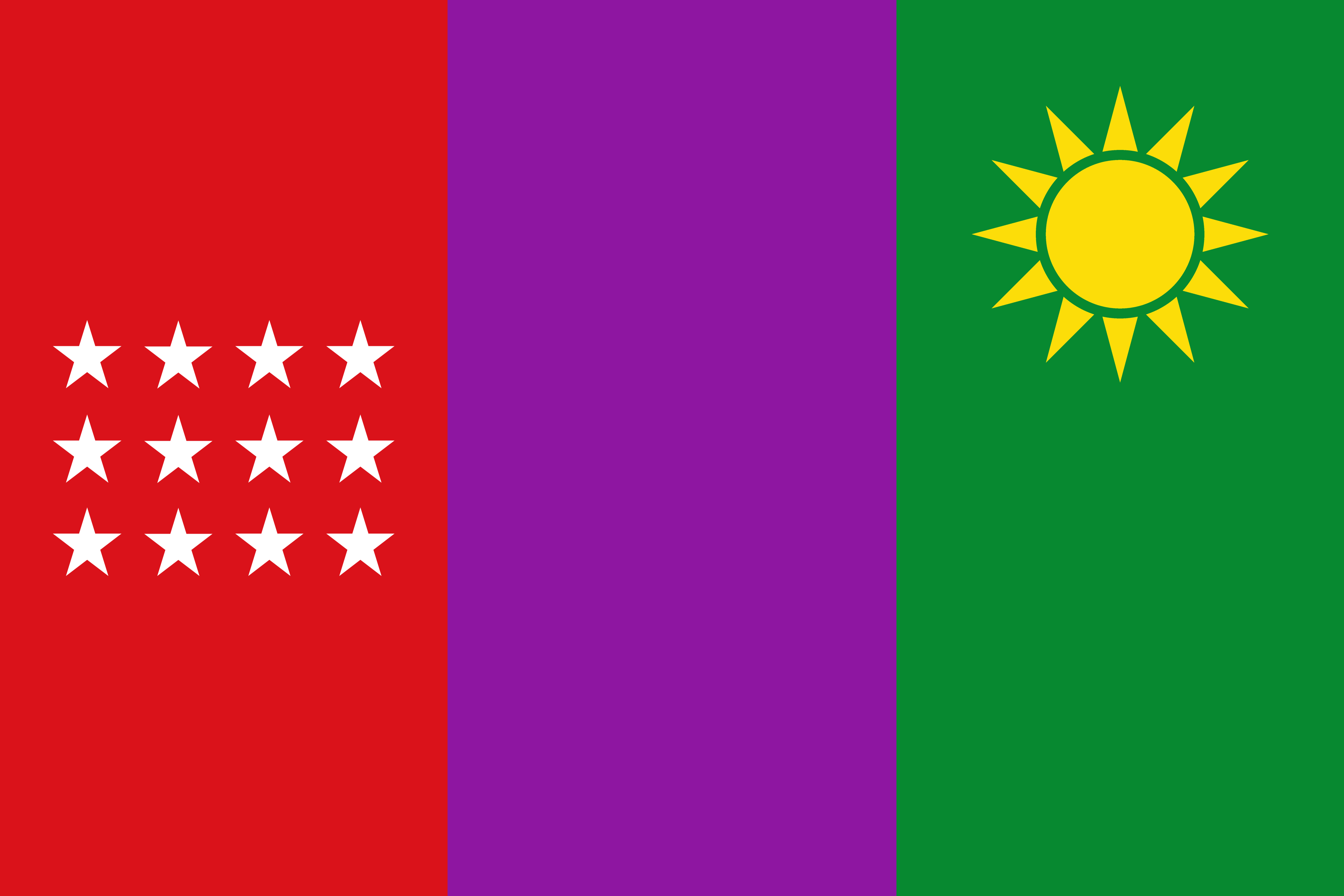
Jaén

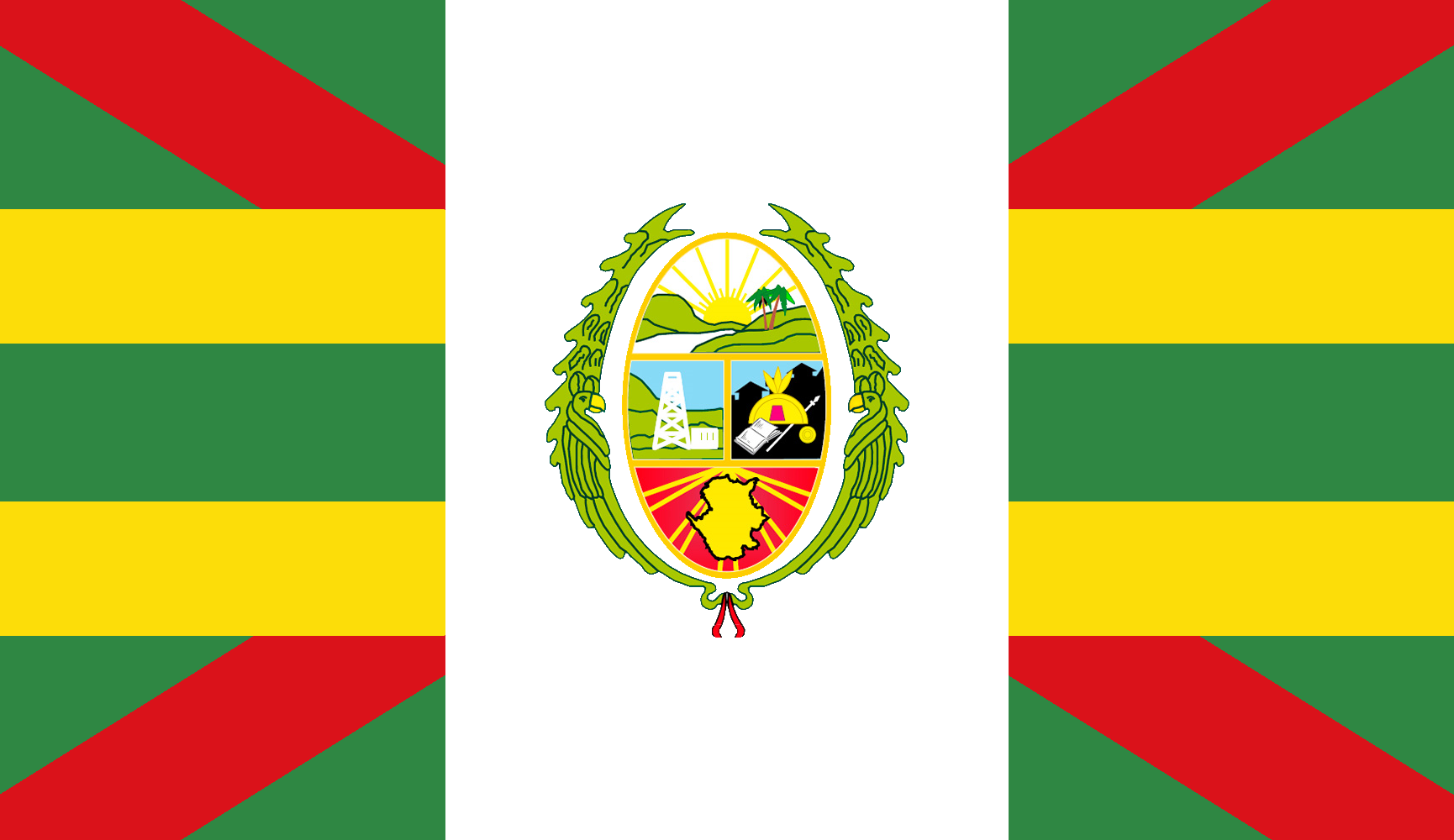
La Convención

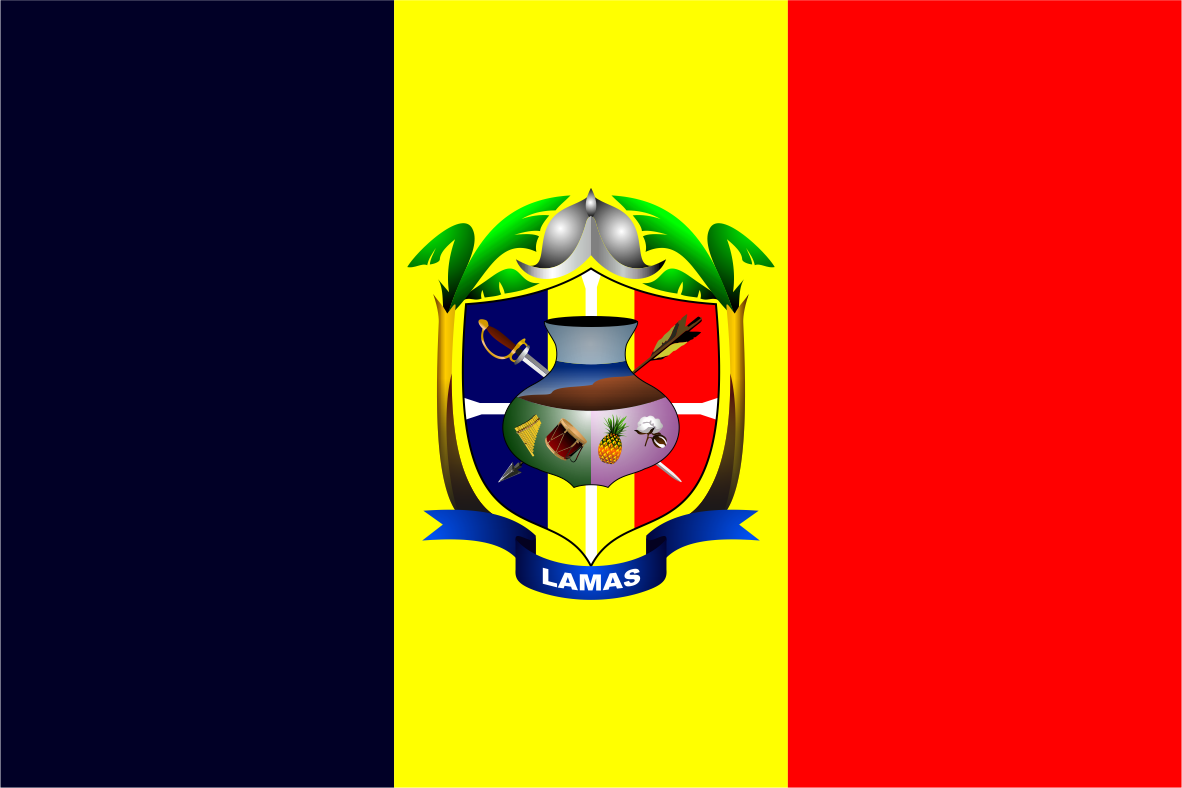
Lamas

Lauricocha

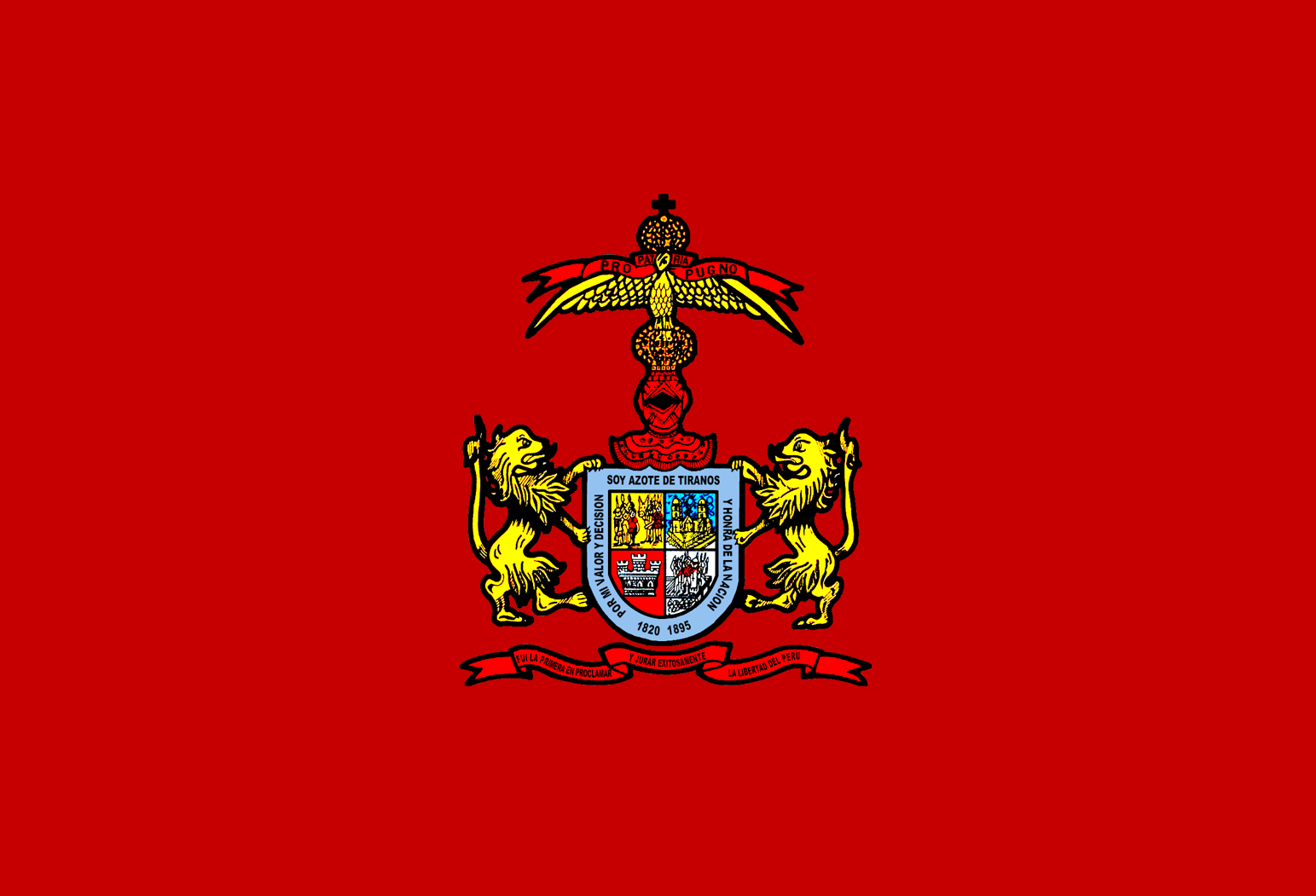
Lambayeque

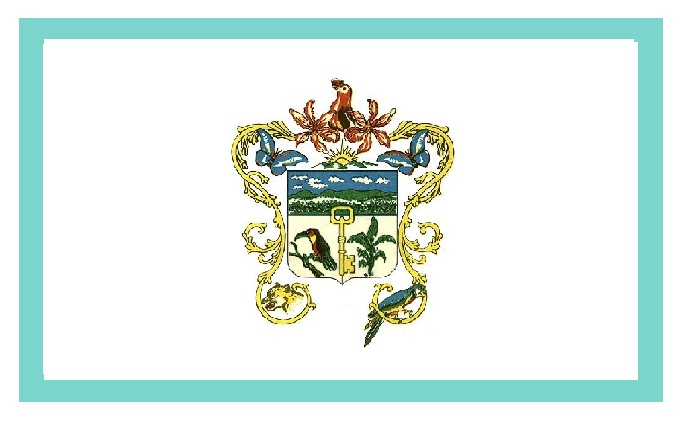
Leoncio Prado

Lima

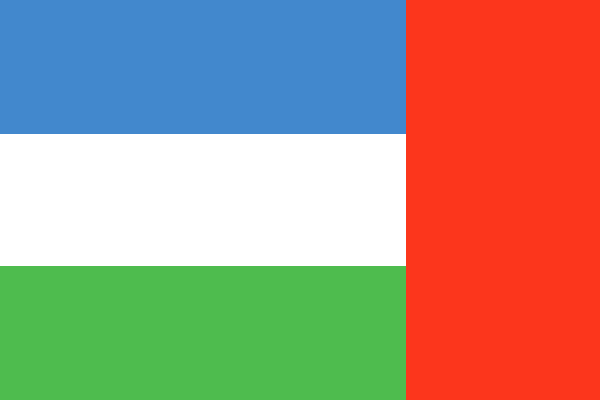
Luya

Mariscal Nieto

Morropón

Moyobamba

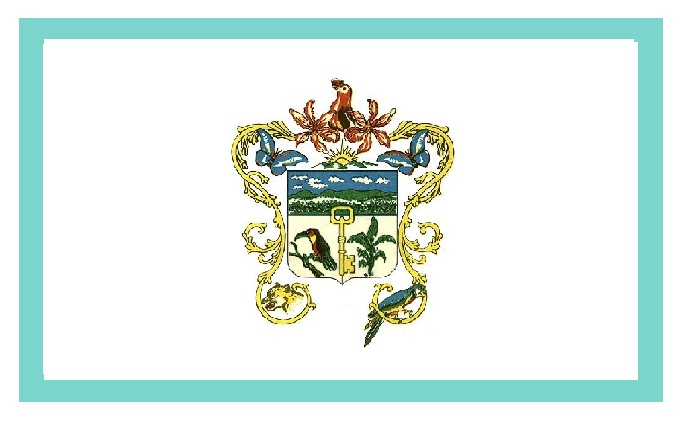
Moyobamba

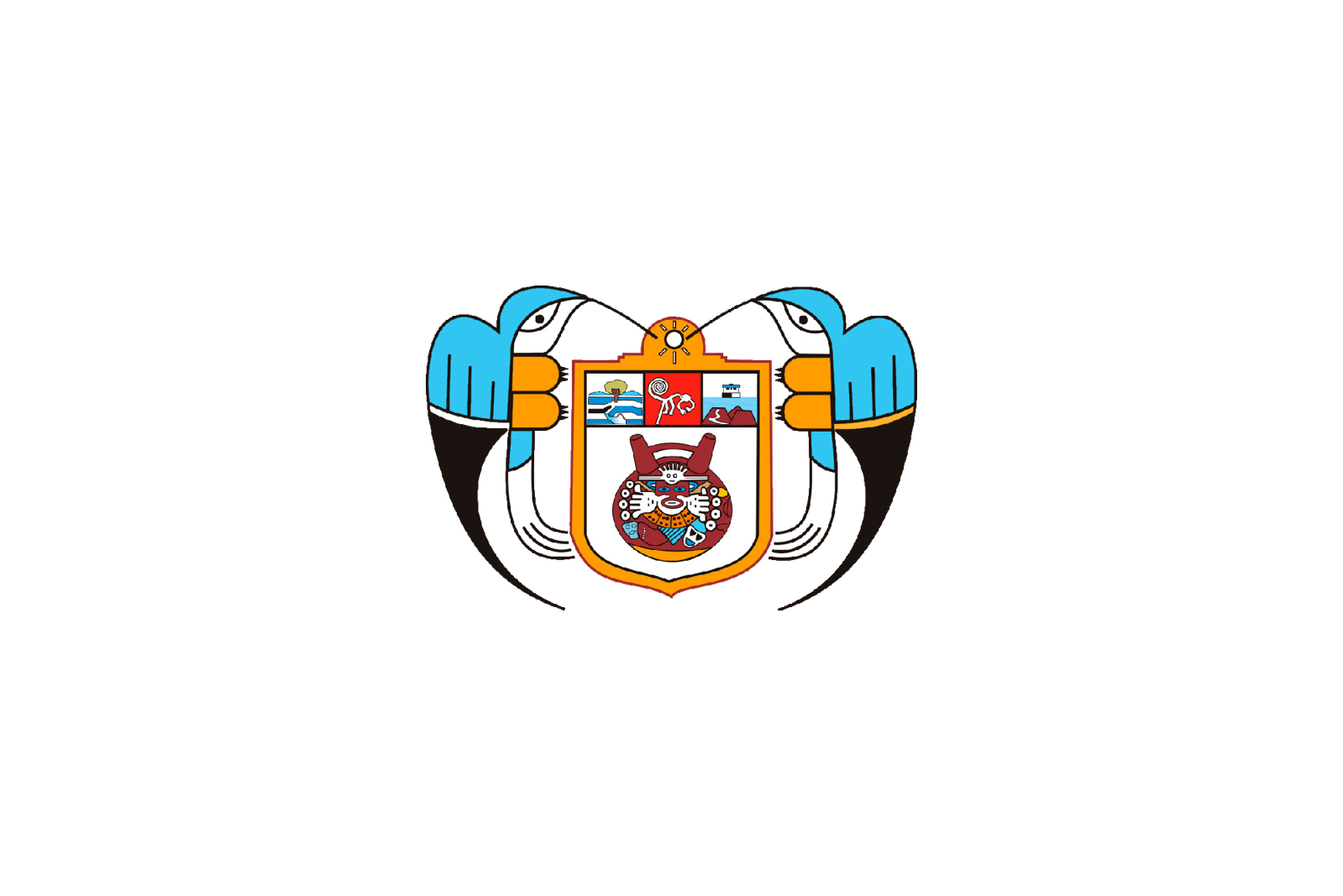
Nazca

Oxapampa

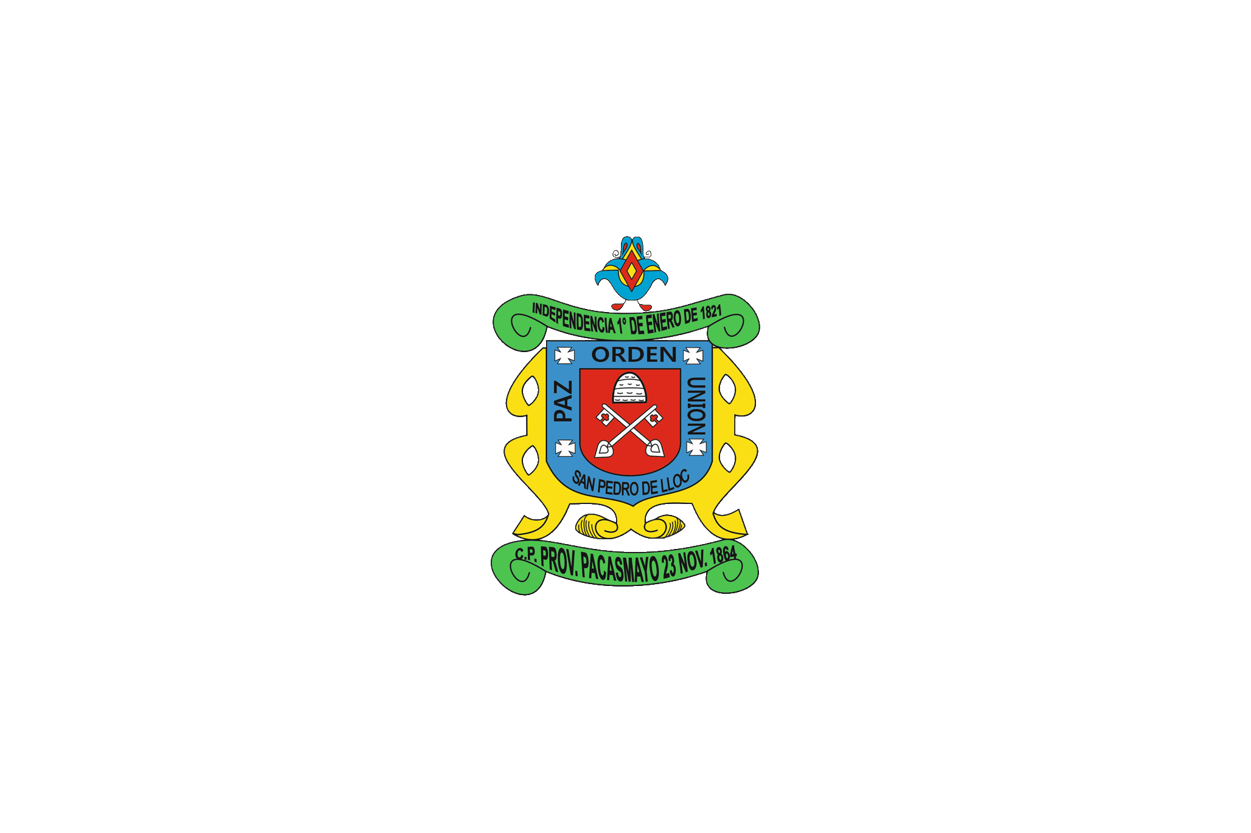
Pacasmayo

Paita

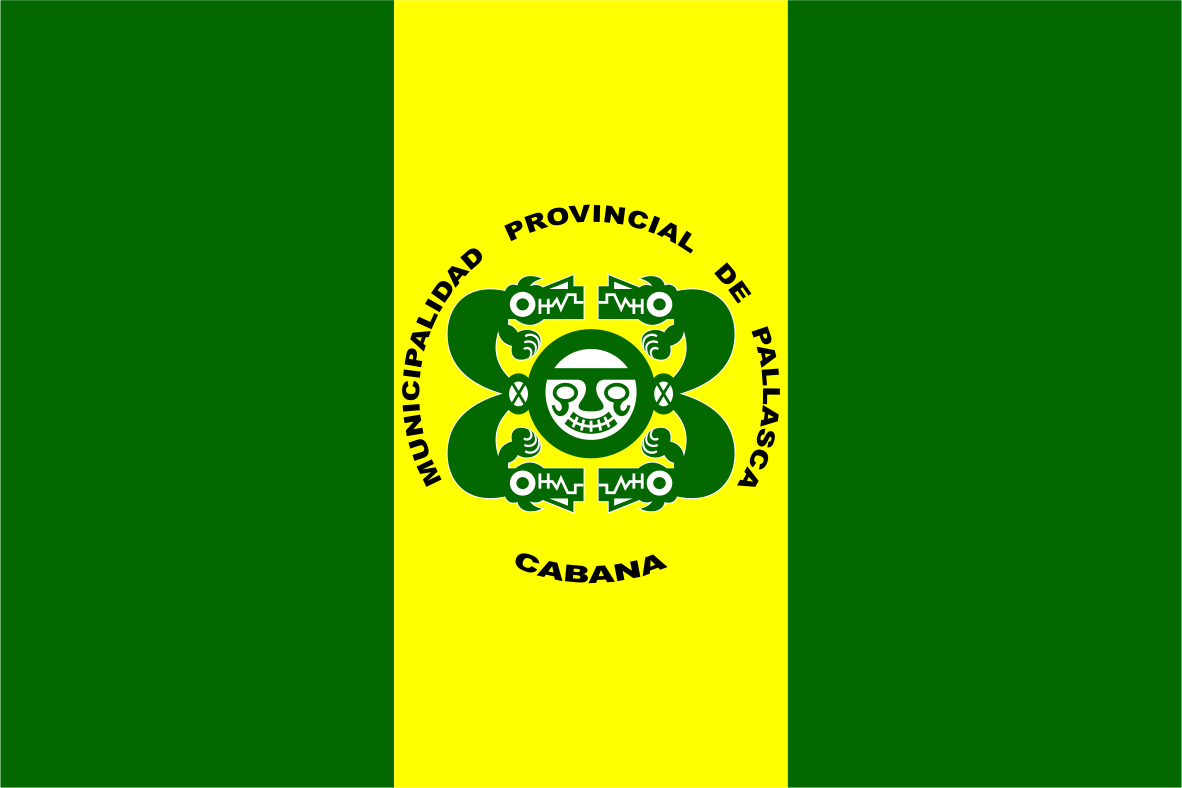
Pallasca

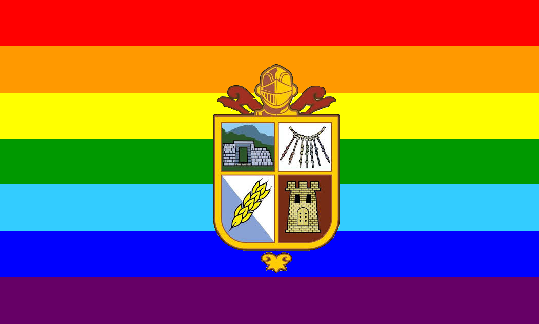
Paruro

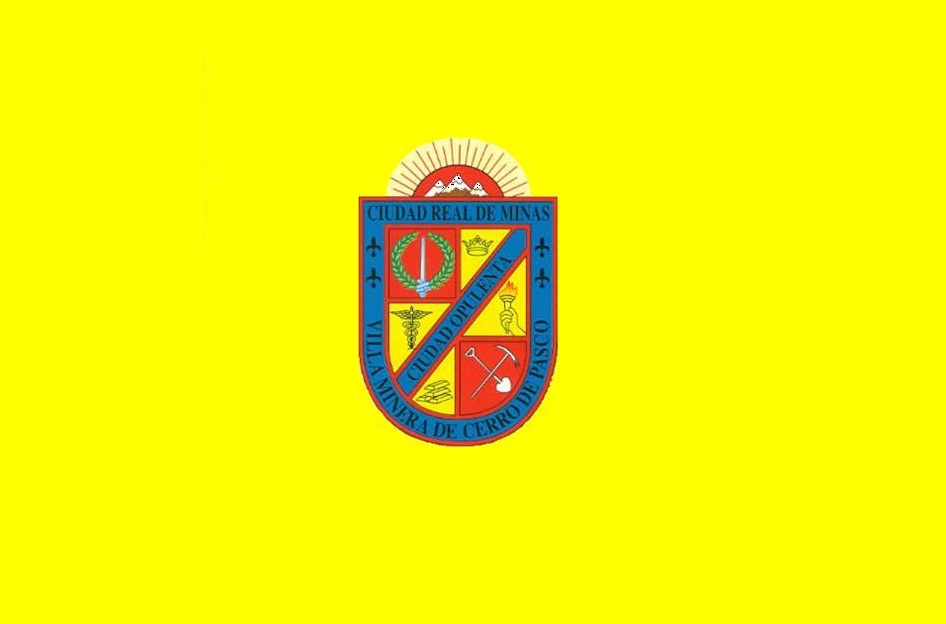
Pasco

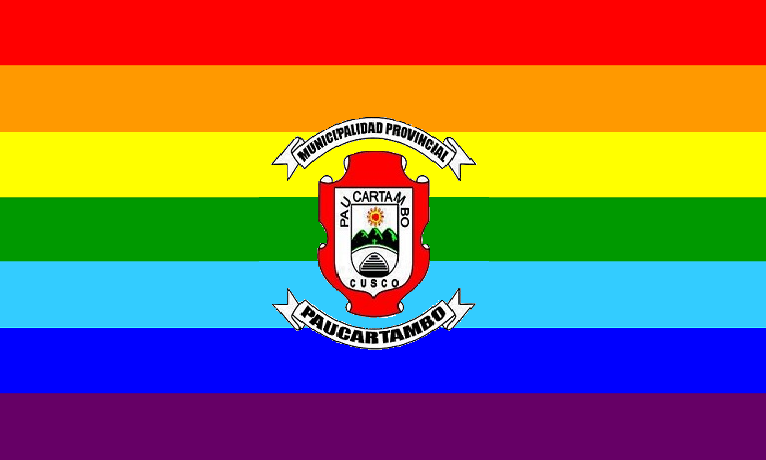
Paucartambo

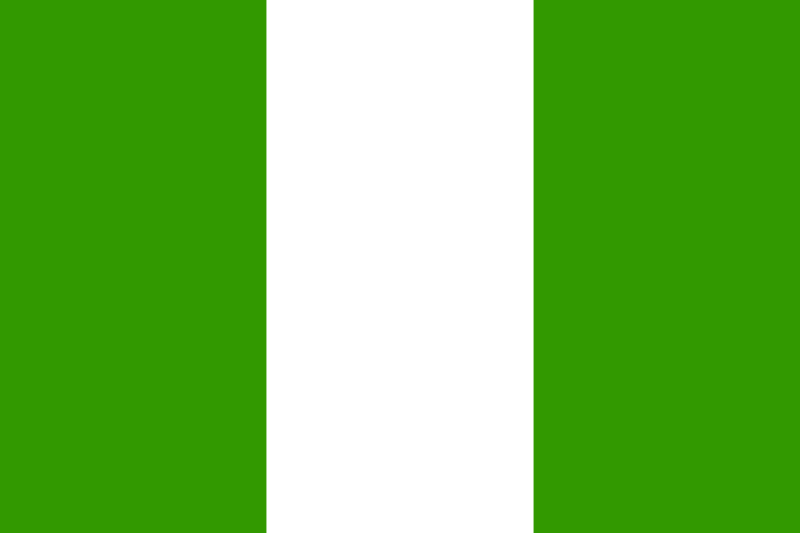
Picota

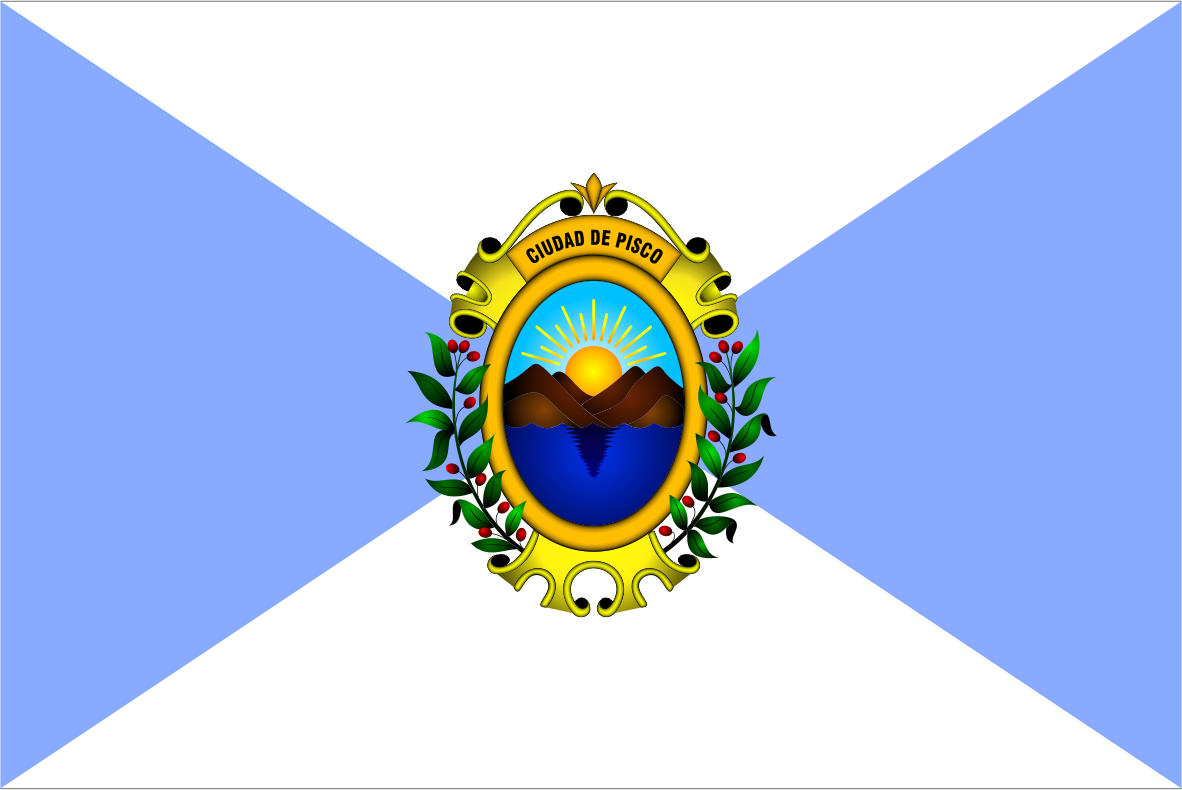
Pisco

Paita

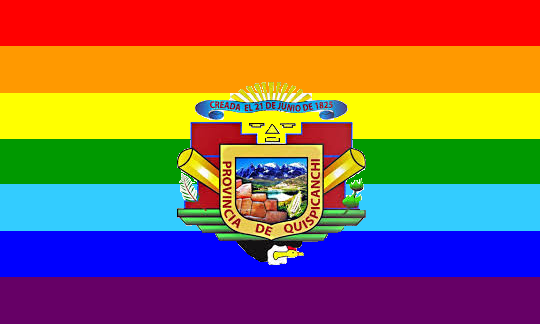
Quispicanchi

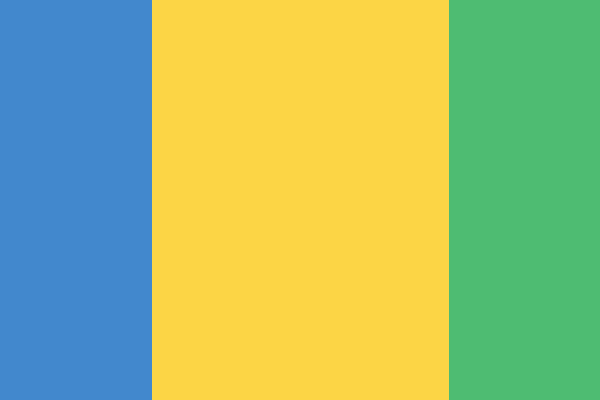
Rodríguez de Mendoza

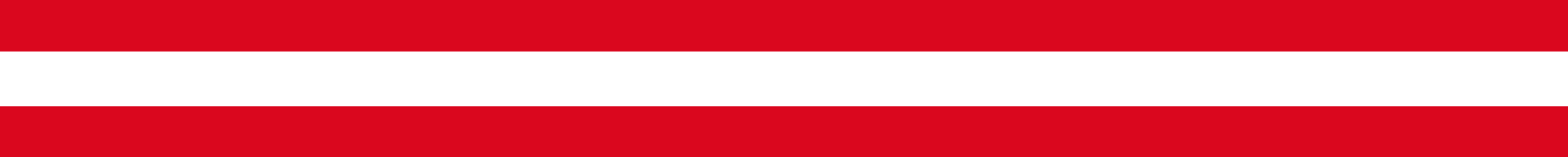
Sánchez Carrión

San Ignacio

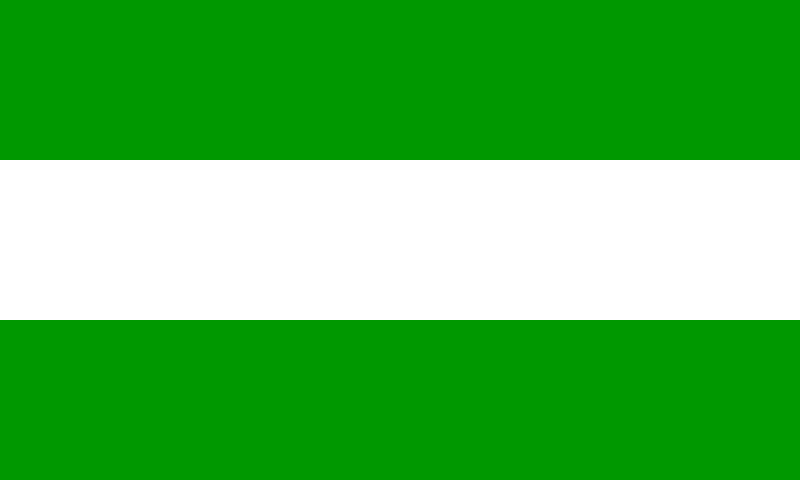
San Martín

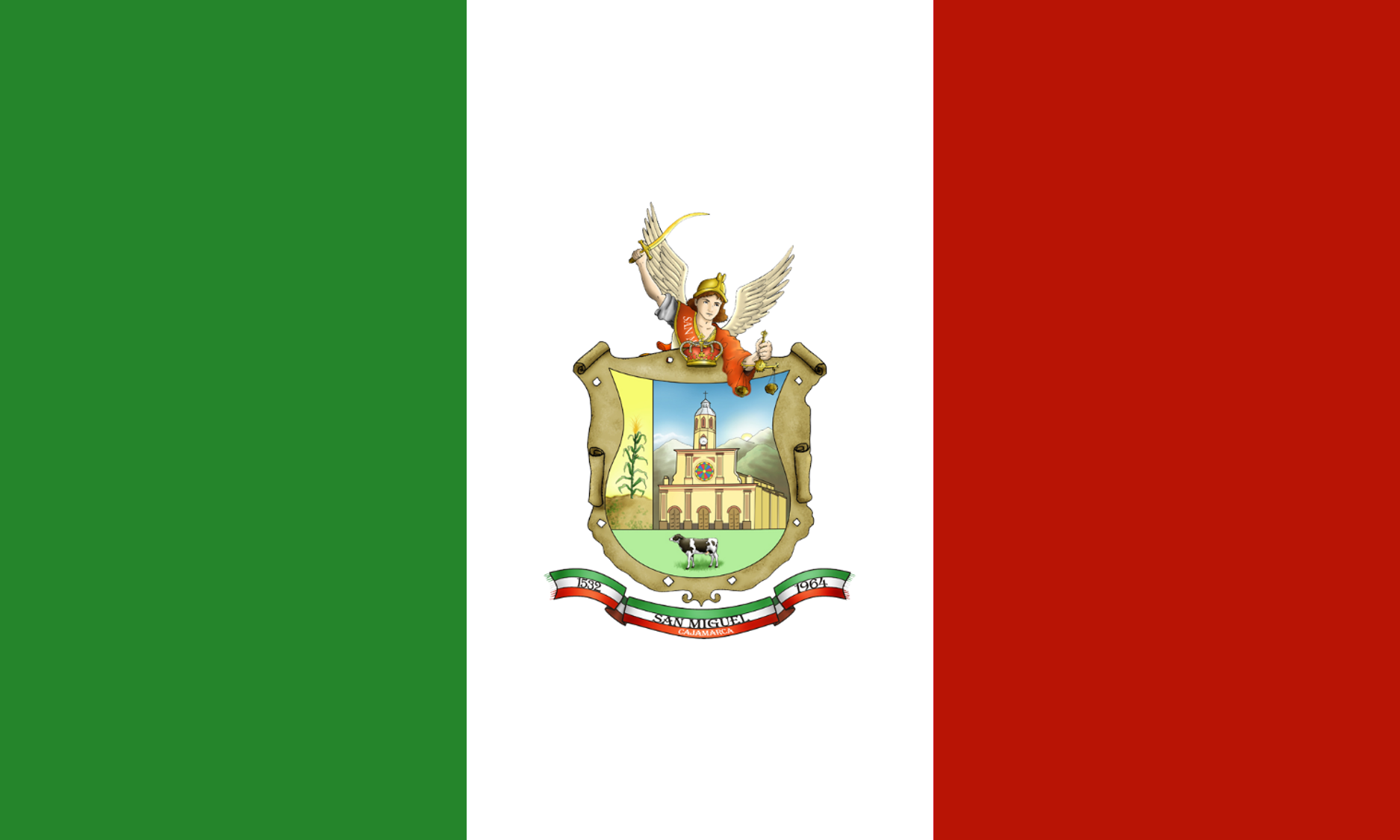
San Miguel

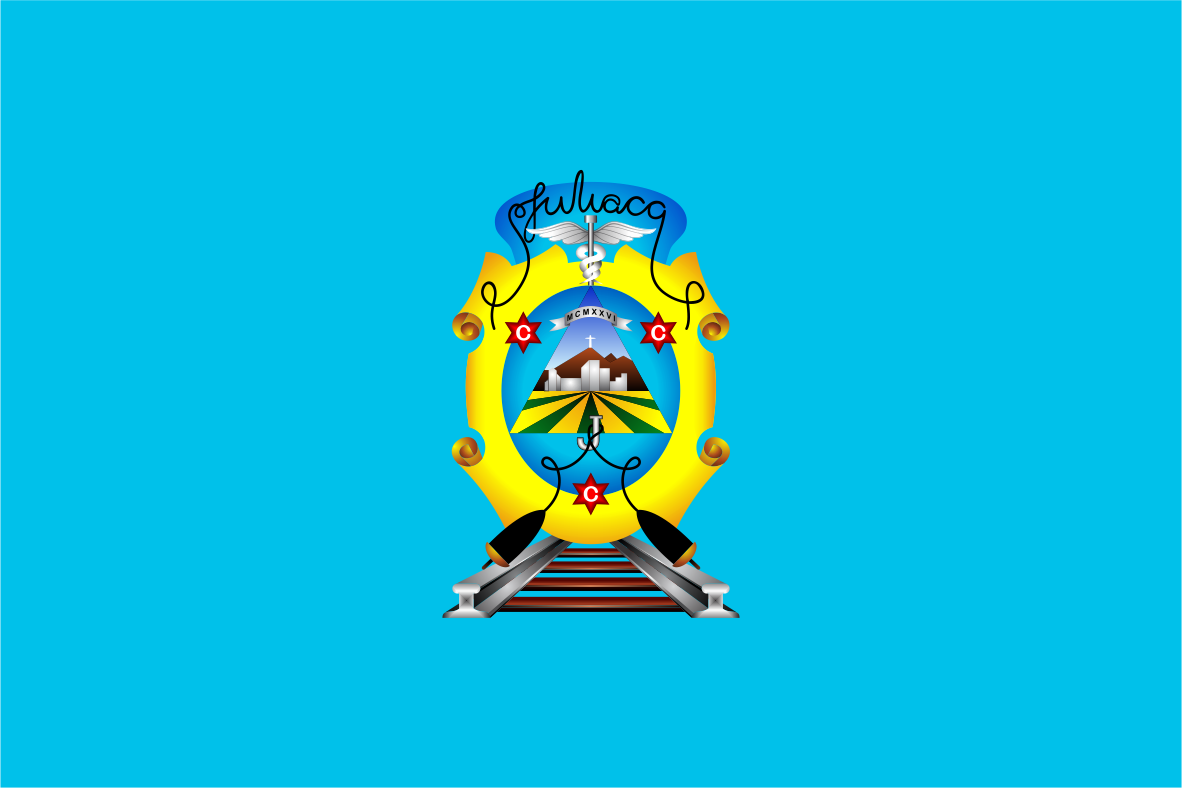
San Román

Santa

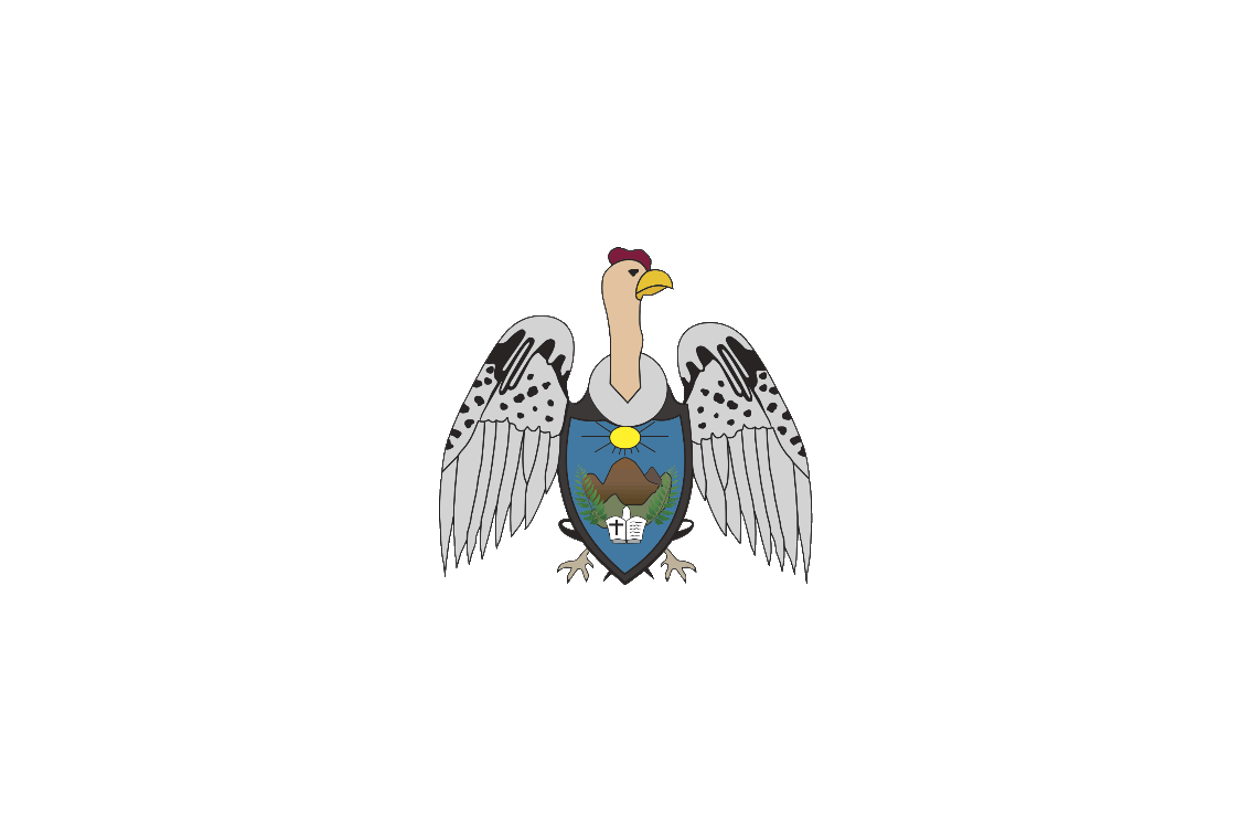
Santiago de Chuco

Sechura

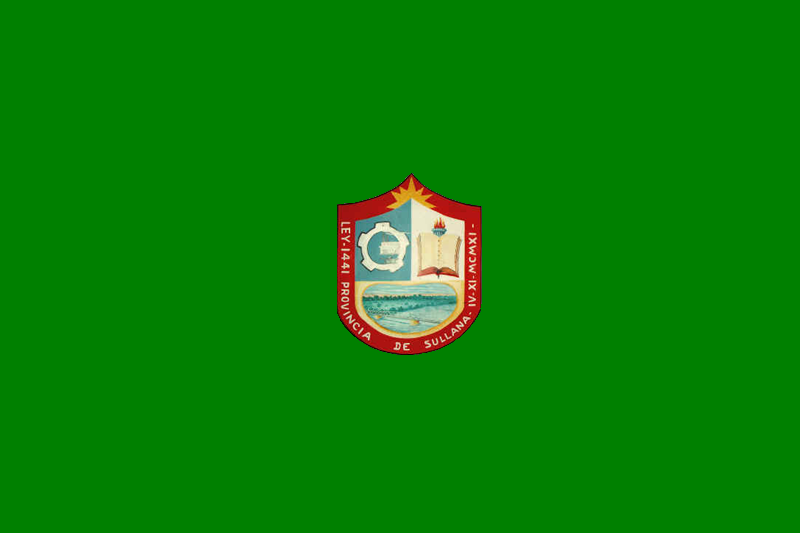
Sullana

Tarma

Trujillo

Tumbes

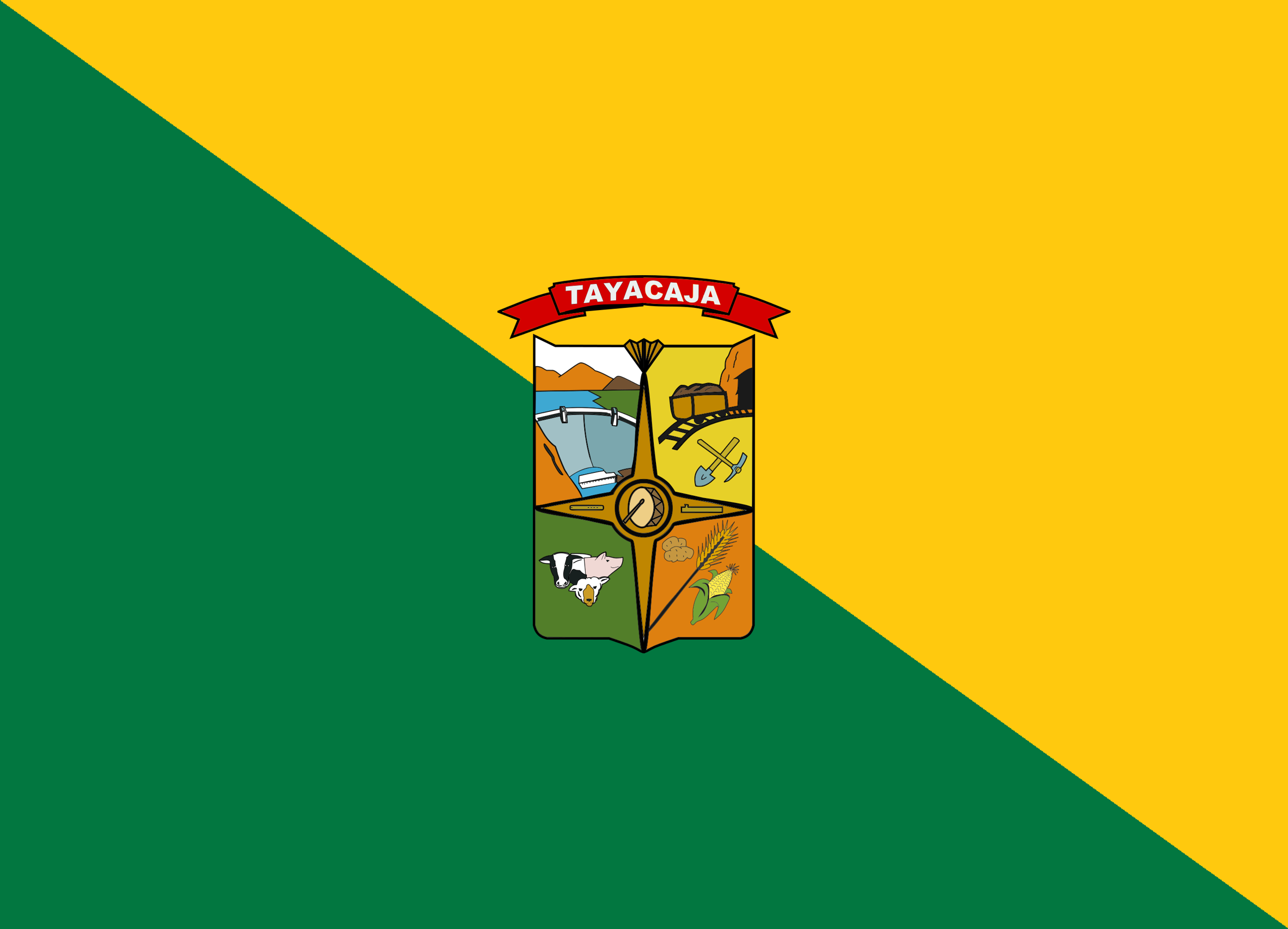
Tayacaja

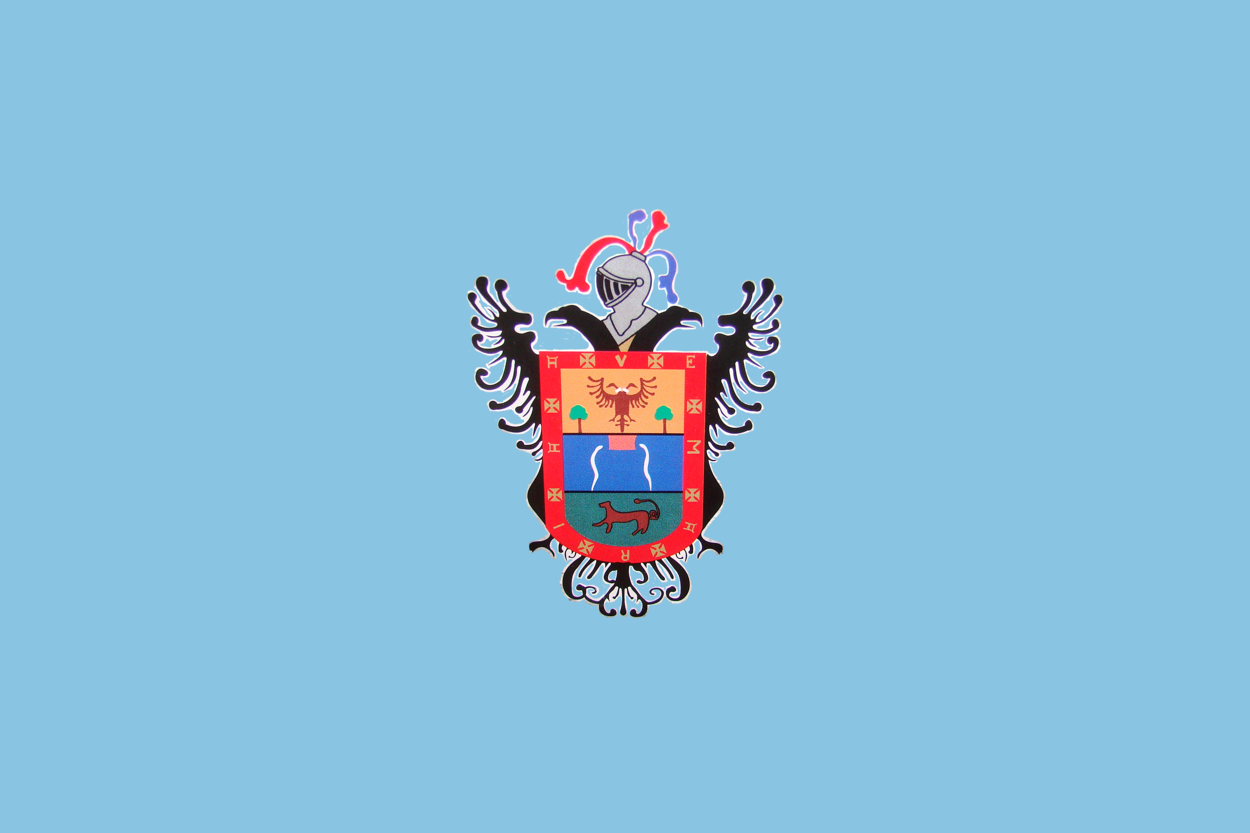
Urubamba

Utcubamba

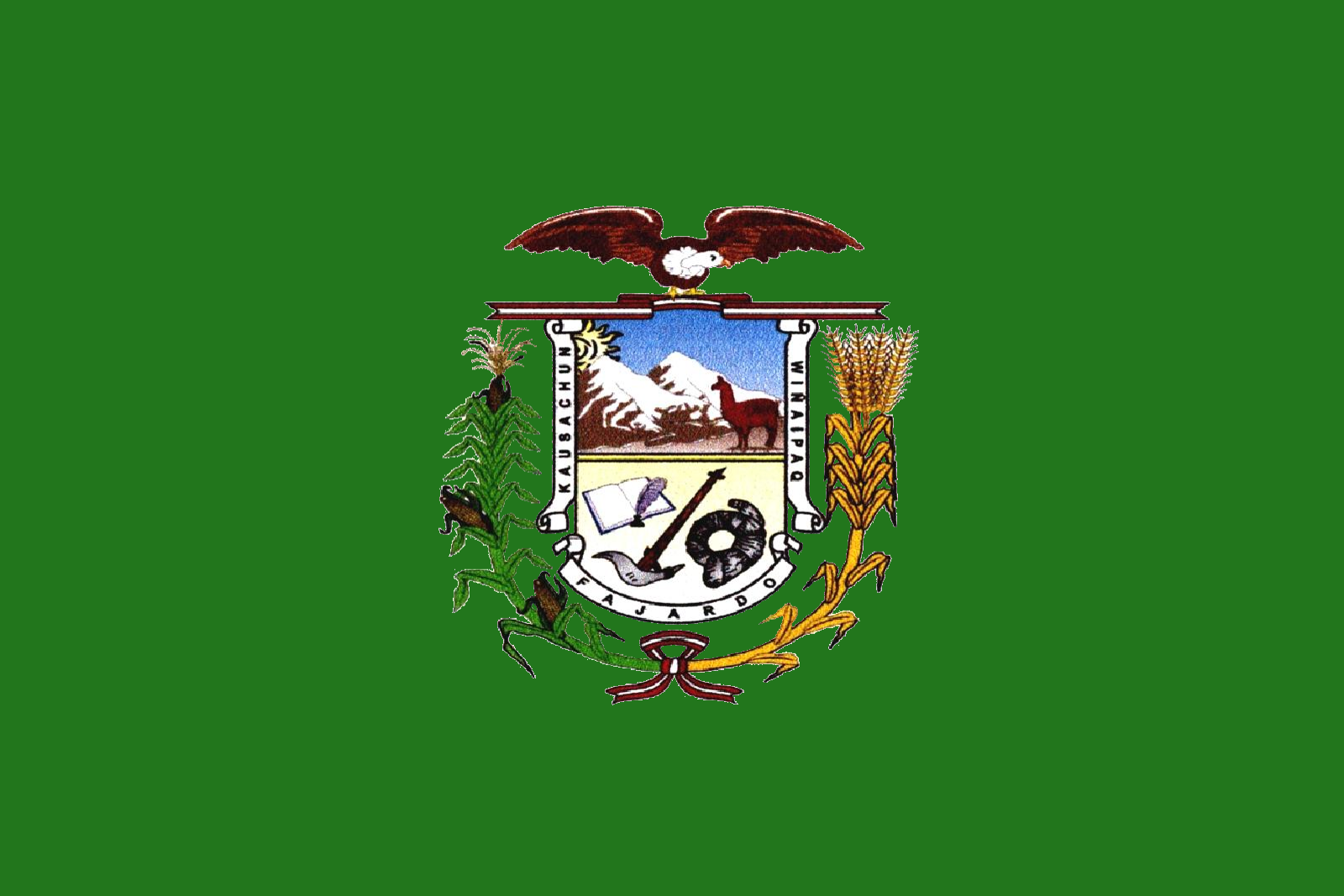
Victor Fajardo

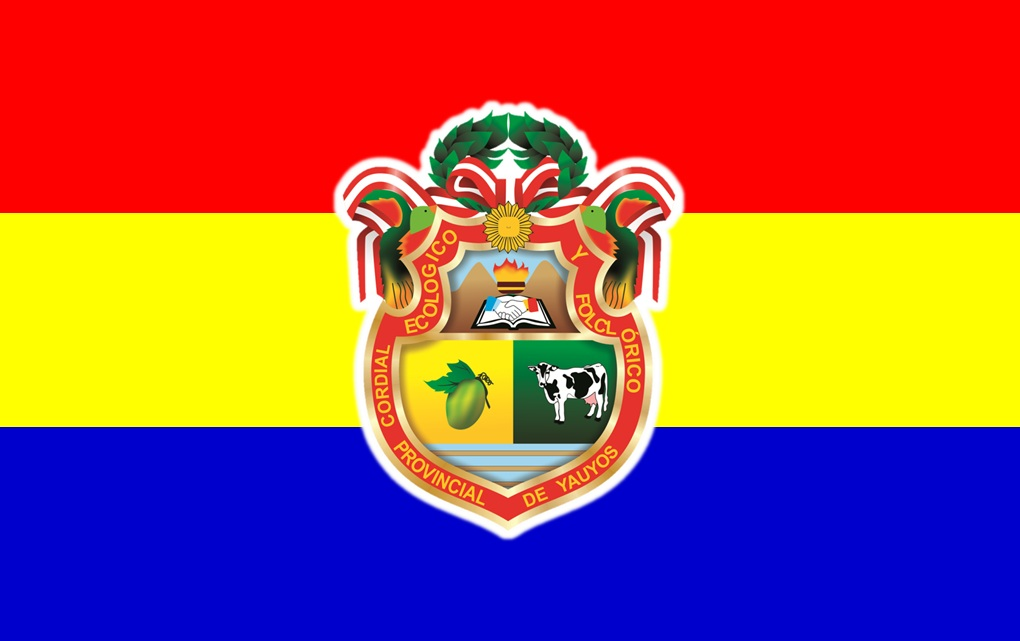
Yauyos

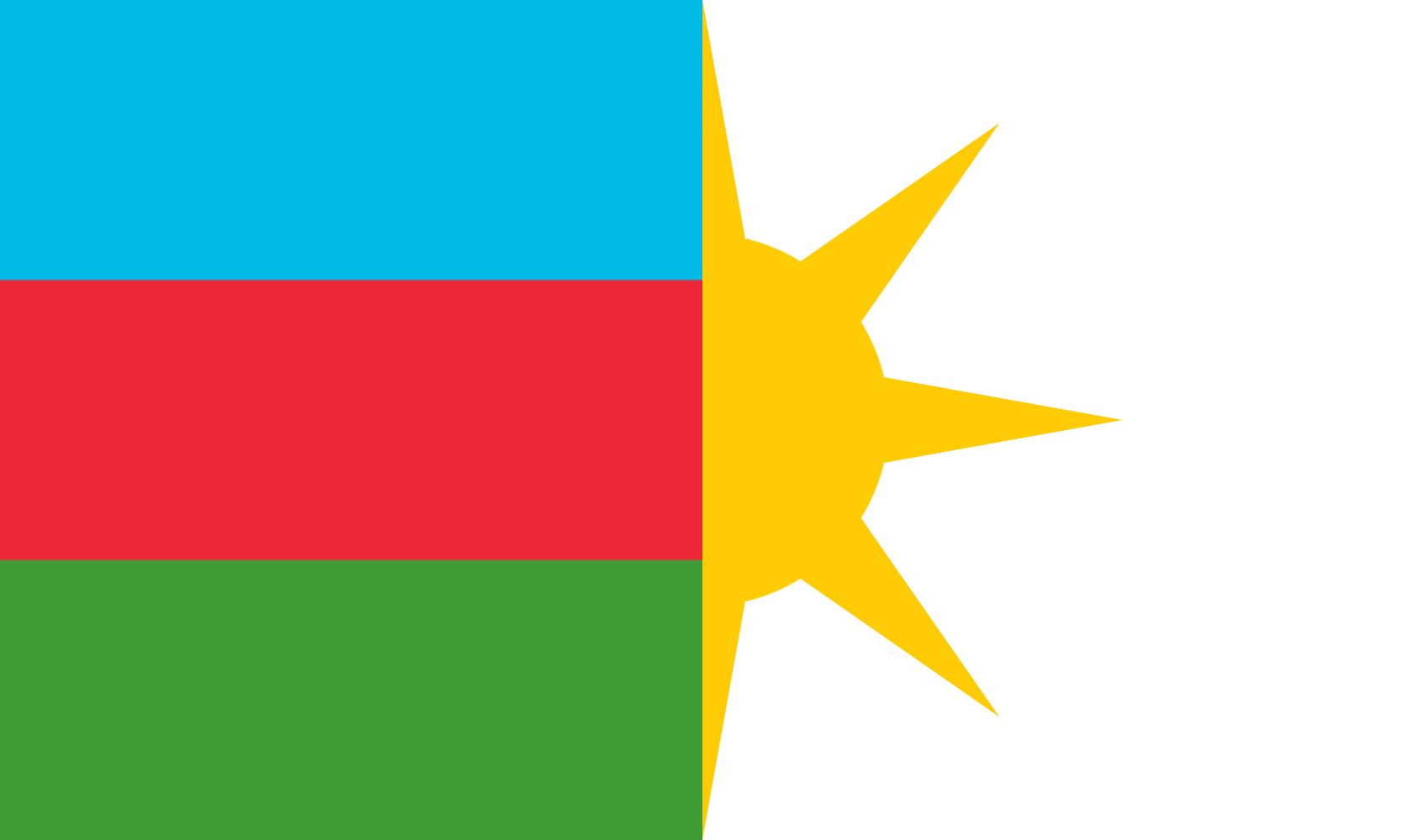
Zarumilla

== Uruguay ==
=== Departments ===
Flag	Date	Use	Description
	?-Present	Flag of The Artigas Department	
	?-Present	Flag of The Canelones Department	
	?-Present	Flag of The Colonia Department	
	?-Present	Flag of The Durazno Department	
	?-Present	Flag of The Cerro Largo Department	
	?-Present	Flag of The Río Negro Department	
	?-Present	Flag of The Lavalleja Department	
	?-Present	Flag of The Paysandú Department	
	?-Present	Flag of The Rocha Department	
	?-Present	Flag of The Salto Department	
	?-Present	Flag of The San José Department	
	?-Present	Flag of The Soriano Department	
	?-Present	Flag of The Treinta y Tres Department	

== Venezuela ==
=== States ===
Flag	Date	Use	Description
	2002–present	Amazonas	Horizontal tricolor of blue, green and red with a brown outline of the state (bordered in yellow) in the center. The map is charged with seven stars spread unevenly inside the map, showing the location of the state's seven municipalities, alongside an outline of Cerro Autana and a Yanomami's face. Ratio 2:3.
	1999–present	Anzoátegui	Main article: Flag of Anzoátegui Horizontal tricolor of light blue, yellow and green with a black border outlining the state in the center and the state's coat of arms on the hoist side of the blue band. Ratio 2:3.
	1996–present	Apure	Horizontal triband of yellow, blue and green; with a white triangle based at the hoist side charged with the state's coat of arms and seven white stars on the blue band. Ratio 2:3.
	1993–present	Aragua	Bicolor diagonal quartered of red and yellow with the state's coat of arms in the center. Ratio 2:3.
	1997–present	Barinas	Horizontal tricolor of light blue, white and green, with a red square in the center of the white band, charged with a yellow rising sun, a road of the same color and a green palm tree. Ratio 2:3.
	2000–present	Bolívar	Main article: Flag of Bolívar State Yellow field with a green circle in the center, superposed by three horizontal blue stripes. The state's coat of arms is on the upper hoist side of the yellow field and the central blue stripe is charged with eight white stars. Ratio 110:168.
	2022–present	Capital District (Caracas)	Three triangles of red, blue and red, with a white star in the center. The base of the blue triangle contains in green the shape of Waraira Repano (Cerro El Ávila). Ratio 2:3.
	1995–present	Carabobo	Horizontal triband of red, blue and red again, in which the upper red band takes three fifths of the flag. The red band is charged with a yellow sun based on the fly side of the blue band. The sun is charged with the Arc of Carabobo. The upper side of the blue band is bordered by a green line. Ratio 2:3.
	1997–present	Cojedes	Horizontal triband of orange, black and blue in which the orange band takes four sixths of the flag; with a blue circle charged with a yellow sun on the hoist side of the orange band. Ratio 2:3.
	2004–present	Delta Amacuro	Horizontal triband of light blue, green and blue; with a white, yellow, brown and black-edged blue triangle based on the hoist, charged with a green outline of the state. The proportion of the bands is 3:2:3; and the sky blue band is charged with an arc of four white stars. Ratio 2:3.
	2006–present	Falcón	Blue field with a yellow rising sun on the upper hoist side and a white moon on the lower fly side; charged with a red chief bearing the words "Muera la Tiranía Viva la Libertad" ("Death to Tyranny and long live Freedom"). Based on Francisco de Miranda's naval flag. Ratio 2:3.
	Unknown. First spotted in 2004	Federal Dependencies (Probably unofficial)	Horizontal tricolor of green, white and blue, with a red fish in the center of the white band. Ratio 2:3.
	1995–present	Guárico	Four horizontal bands of blue, white, yellow and green, with the state's coat of arms on the hoist side of the blue band; charged with a half-blue, half-green outline of the map bearing a cow's head sided by an ear of rice and an ear of sorghum, and an image of the Morros de San Juan. The map is surrounded by fourteen golden stars (seven on each side). Ratio 2:3.
	2000–present	Lara	Two horizontal bands of red and green, the red twice the size of the green. The red band is charged with a setting sun with thirteen yellow-edged white rays based on the green band. Ratio 2:3.
	1996–present	Mérida	Three triangles of green, white and light blue, with a red star in the center. The white central triangle is based on the bottom of the flag, dividing the green and light blue triangles. Ratio 2:3.
	2006–present	Miranda	Horizontal tricolor of black, red and yellow, with an arc of six white stars in the center of the red band and a yellow sun on the hoist side of the black band, charged with two cocoa branches and the words "Libertad o Muerte" ("Liberty or Death"). Based on Francisco de Miranda's military flag. Ratio 2:3.
	2003–present	Monagas	Light blue field superposed by three horizontal bands of blue, green and black, with a yellow sun based on the middle of the green band. The light blue field is charged with a stylized black outline of Juana Ramírez under an arc of thirteen white stars Ratio 2:3.
	1998–present	Nueva Esparta	Horizontal tricolor of yellow, green and blue, in which the yellow band takes half of the flag; the green band is charged with three white stars and the yellow band is charged with a white semi-circle based on the fly side of the green band. Ratio 2:3.
	1996–present	Portuguesa	Two horizontal bands of blue and green separated by a narrow white stripe; the blue band is slightly larger than the green and has a white-edged sun on its upper hoist side. Ratio 2:3.
	2002–present	Sucre	Diagonal bisection of white and sky blue, with the state's coat of arms on the upper hoist side and fifteen white stars on the lower fly side. Ratio 2:3.
	1997–present	Táchira	Horizontal tricolor of yellow, black and red, with two coffee branches under an arc of four white stars. Ratio 2:3.
	1994–present	Trujillo	Two horizontal bands of red and white with a green triangle based on the hoist, charged with a white star bearing a pigeon. Ratio 2:3.
	1999–present	La Guaira (formerly known as Vargas)	Two horizontal bands of white and blue with proportions of 3:1 on the hoist side; the white field charged with a red-edged yellow sun and the blue with four white stars. To the fly side, four vertical bands of yellow, red, white and blue. Based on the flag of José María España and Manuel Gual. Ratio 2:3.
	1995–present	Yaracuy	A white diagonal band radiating from the lower hoist-side corner. The upper triangle is red, and the lower triangle is blue. On the center of the flag, a yellow sun with a circle showing a green field with brown mountains in the horizon, and a light blue sky with three white clouds. Ratio 2:3.
	1991–present	Zulia	Two horizontal bands of blue and black, with a yellow sun in the center charged with a white thunder bolt. Ratio 2:3.
