= List of sovereign states by freshwater withdrawal =

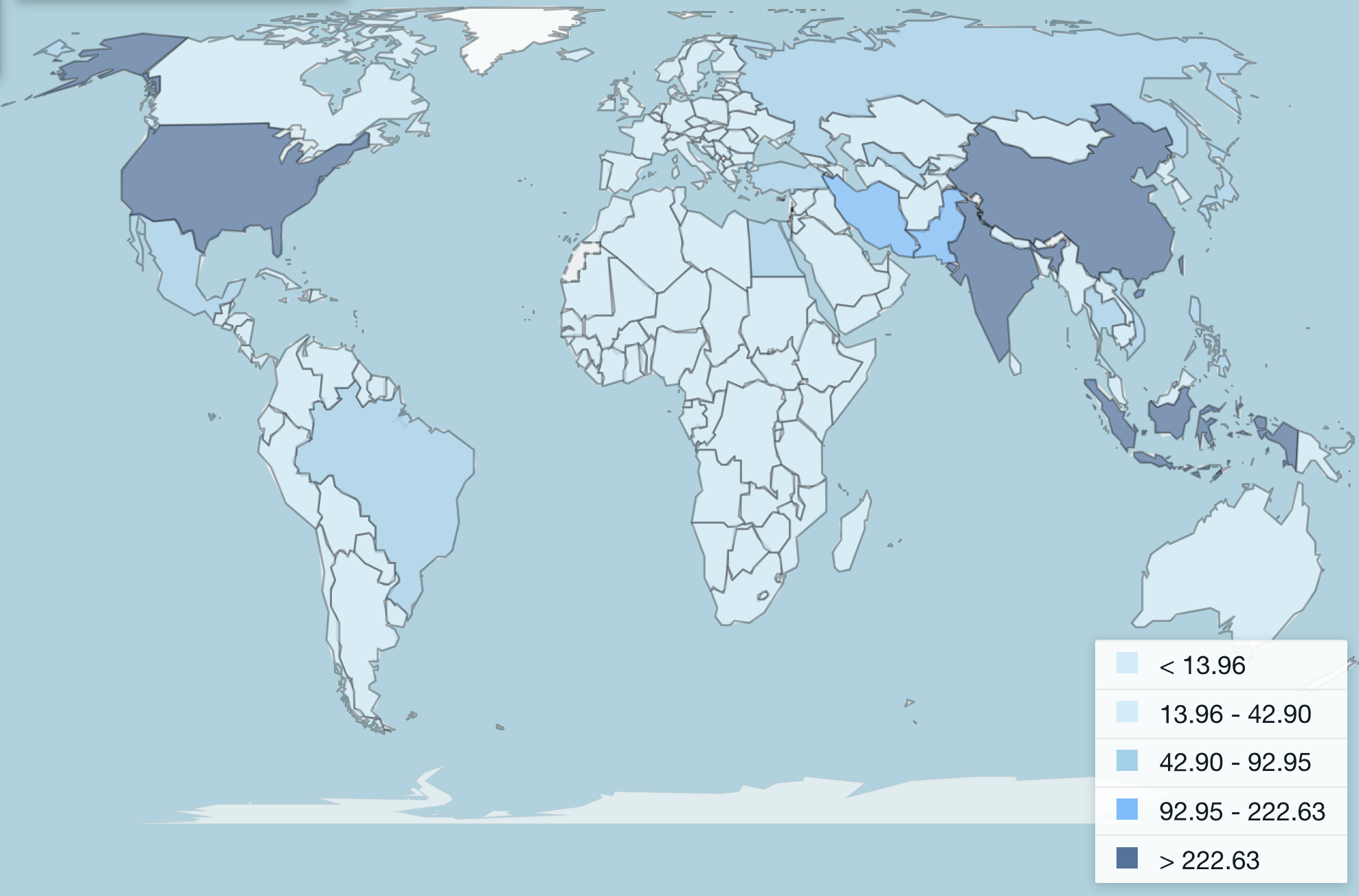
Global map of countries by total annual freshwater withdrawals (billion cubic meters) in 2020, according to World Bank

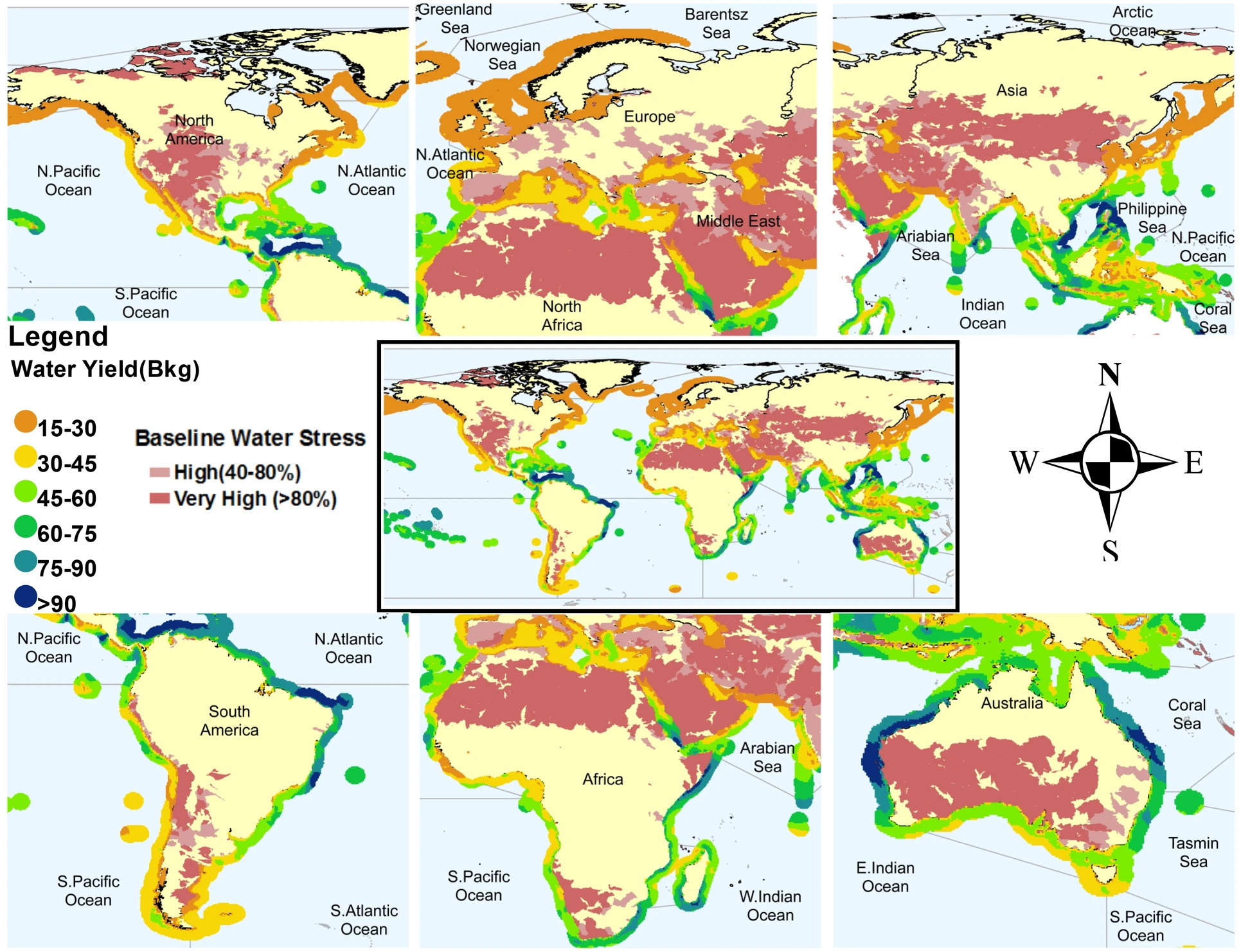
Spatial variability of water yield along the delineated near-offshore region of 200 km across the world

This is the list of countries by freshwater withdrawal for the year 2020, based on the latest data available in January 2024, by World Bank and Food and Agriculture Organization (AQUASTAT data). The list includes sovereign states and self-governing dependent territories based upon the ISO standard ISO 3166-1.

According to World Bank, ″annual freshwater withdrawals refer to total water withdrawals, not counting evaporation losses from storage basins. Withdrawals also include water from desalination plants in countries where they are a significant source. Withdrawals can exceed 100 percent of total renewable resources where extraction from nonrenewable aquifers or desalination plants is considerable or where there is significant water reuse. Withdrawals for agriculture and industry are total withdrawals for irrigation and livestock production and for direct industrial use (including withdrawals for cooling thermoelectric plants). Withdrawals for domestic uses include drinking water, municipal use or supply, and use for public services, commercial establishments, and homes.″

The level of water stress (freshwater withdrawal as a proportion of available freshwater resources) is the ratio between total freshwater withdrawn by all major sectors and total renewable freshwater resources, after taking into account environmental water requirements. Main sectors, as defined by ISIC standards, include agriculture; forestry and fishing; manufacturing; electricity industry; and services. This indicator is also known as water withdrawal intensity.

According to Food and Agriculture Organization, ″total freshwater withdrawal is the sum of surface water withdrawal and groundwater withdrawal″.

[Total freshwater withdrawal (surface water + groundwater)] = [Total water withdrawal] - [Desalinated water produced] - [Treated wastewater reused] - [Reused agricultural drainage water]

== List of countries by freshwater withdrawal ==
The following table provides information on annual freshwater withdrawal based on data published by World Bank and Food and Agriculture Organization. Sorting is alphabetical by country code, according to ISO 3166-1 alpha-3.

Country/Territory/Region/Group	Annual freshwater withdrawals					Per capita withdrawal	Withdrawal intensity
Country/Territory/Region/Group	Total		Domestic	Industry	Agriculture	Per capita withdrawal	Withdrawal intensity
Country/Territory/Region/Group	(mil. m^{3})	(%)	(%)	(%)	(%)	(m^{3}/inhab/year)	(%)
Afghanistan	20282.0	43.02%	1.00%	0.83%	98.17%	523.34	54.76%
Angola	705.7	0.48%	45.27%	33.95%	20.78%	21.47	1.87%
Albania	786.0	2.92%	28.63%	2.04%	69.34%	273.13	4.72%
United Arab Emirates	2381.0	1587.33%	52.76%	0.74%	46.50%	124.03	1 587.33%
Argentina	37690.0	12.91%	15.48%	10.59%	73.93%	835.92	10.46%
Armenia	2830.0	41.26%	23.08%	6.57%	70.34%	954.70	57.09%
Antigua and Barbuda	4.4	8.46%	62.61%	21.74%	15.65%	117.43	8.46%
Australia	8640.0	1.76%	16.64%	21.04%	62.32%	539.02	3.47%
Austria	3490.0	6.35%	20.62%	77.17%	2.21%	387.74	9.64%
Azerbaijan	12590.0	155.14%	3.16%	4.51%	92.33%	1240.63	55.60%
Burundi	280.1	2.78%	15.39%	5.36%	79.26%	23.56	10.19%
Belgium	4199.0	34.99%	17.33%	81.39%	1.27%	367.86	51.58%
Benin	130.0	1.26%	61.97%	12.82%	25.21%	19.30	0.98%
Burkina Faso	818.0	6.54%	45.92%	2.65%	51.43%	39.13	7.82%
Bangladesh	35870.0	34.16%	10.04%	2.15%	87.82%	217.80	5.72%
Bulgaria	5076.0	24.17%	16.51%	68.54%	14.95%	730.67	37.52%
Bahrain	155.1	3877.50%	63.44%	3.25%	33.31%	255.29	133.71%
Bosnia and Herzegovina	301.3	0.85%					2.00%
Belarus	1328.0	3.91%	41.31%	31.00%	27.61%	140.64	4.38%
Belize	101.0	0.66%	11.29%	20.99%	67.72%	254.01	1.26%
Bolivia	2088.0	0.69%	6.51%	1.53%	91.95%	178.87	1.18%
Brazil	67190.0	1.19%	24.00%	14.15%	61.64%	316.15	1.48%
Barbados	70.0	87.50%	24.69%	7.65%	67.65%	281.86	87.50%
Brunei	92.0	1.08%	164.67%		5.76%	210.30	3.47%
Bhutan	337.9	0.43%	5.03%	0.89%	94.08%	438.05	1.41%
Botswana	220.4	9.18%	49.54%	13.50%	36.96%	93.73	2.31%
Central African Republic	72.5	0.05%	82.90%	16.55%	0.55%	15.01	0.34%
Canada	36253.0	1.27%	13.43%	75.92%	10.65%	41	3.73%
Switzerland	1704.0	4.22%	54.59%	36.36%	9.06%	204.26	6.50%
Chile	35368.0	4.00%	3.99%	5.13%	90.89%	1693.33	8.98%
China	568480.0	20.21%	20.13%	17.73%	62.14%	395.09	41.52%
Ivory Coast	1162.0	1.51%	27.54%	20.83%	51.64%	299.37	5.09%
Cameroon	1088.4	0.40%	22.68%	9.61%	67.71%	130.63	1.56%
DR Congo	683.6	0.08%	68.01%	21.47%	10.52%	7.63	0.23%
Congo	46.0	0.02%	69.47%	26.17%	4.36%	16.62	0.03%
Colombia	29115.7	1.36%	12.79%	1.23%	85.99%	572.21	4.36%
Comoros	10.0	0.83%	48.00%	5.00%	47.00%	11.50	0.83%
Cape Verde	25.3	8.43%	5.93%	1.48%	92.59%	959.96	8.43%
Costa Rica	3136.1	2.78%	26.41%	7.42%	66.17%	615.63	5.35%
Cuba	6958.0	18.25%	24.43%	10.63%	64.94%	227.77	23.94%
Cyprus	275.0	35.26%	37.45%	6.18%	62.55%	127.56	37.59%
Czech Republic	1366.0	10.39%	46.05%	51.10%	2.86%	44.05	20.77%
Germany	24443.0	22.84%	36.51%	62.08%	1.40%	339.95	33.50%
Djibouti	19.0	6.33%	84.21%	0.00%	15.79%	19.23	6.33%
Dominica	20.0	10.00%	95.00%	0.00%	5.00%	277.83	10.00%
Denmark	976.4	16.27%	40.98%	5.02%	54.01%	168.58	26.40%
Dominican Republic	7137.0	30.37%	9.42%	7.27%	83.31%	836.83	39.55%
Algeria	9802.0	87.15%	34.41%	1.83%	63.76%	238.58	137.92%
Ecuador	9915.8	2.24%	13.04%	5.54%	81.43%	562.15	6.78%
Egypt	77500.0	7750.00%	13.87%	6.97%	79.16%	757.32	141.17%
Eritrea	582.0	20.79%	5.33%	0.17%	94.50%	164.11	11.18%
Spain	29020.0	26.10%	15.71%	18.95%	65.33%	620.69	43.25%
Estonia	853.0	6.71%	7.38%	92.05%	0.57%	642.99	9.23%
Ethiopia	10548.1	8.65%	7.68%	0.48%	91.84%	91.75	32.26%
Finland	3000.0	2.80%	14.29%	57.14%	28.57%	631.69	7.11%
Fiji	84.9	0.30%	29.80%	11.31%	58.89%	94.71	0.30%
France	26272.1	13.14%	20.21%	67.68%	12.12%	402.49	23.00%
Gabon	139.1	0.08%	60.89%	10.14%	28.97%	62.50	0.50%
United Kingdom	8419.0	5.81%	73.95%	12.00%	14.05%	86.78	14.35%
Georgia	1653.7	2.84%	36.66%	20.54%	42.80%	414.55	5.39%
Ghana	1448.6	4.78%	20.46%	6.49%	73.06%	47.13	6.31%
Guinea	890.0	0.39%	25.84%	6.74%	67.42%	67.77	1.37%
Gambia	101.6	3.39%	40.55%	20.87%	38.58%	42.04	2.21%
Guinea-Bissau	175.0	1.09%	17.95%	6.26%	75.79%	96.54	1.50%
Equatorial Guinea	19.8	0.08%	79.80%	15.15%	5.05%	14.11	0.18%
Greece	10122.0	17.45%	16.67%	3.24%	80.09%	971.12	20.48%
Grenada	14.1	7.05%	85.11%	0.00%	14.89%	125.31	7.05%
Guatemala	3324.1	3.04%	25.12%	18.14%	56.74%	185.54	5.74%
Guyana	1444.7	0.60%	4.24%	1.41%	94.34%	1836.75	3.30%
Honduras	1607.0	1.77%	19.60%	7.09%	73.30%	162.25	4.62%
Croatia	665.0	1.76%	37.10%	56.71%	6.18%	614.39	1.48%
Haiti	1450.0	11.15%	13.10%	3.52%	83.38%	127.16	13.38%
Hungary	4672.6	77.88%	14.11%	74.13%	11.76%	482.14	8.07%
Indonesia	222635.0	11.03%	10.69%	4.10%	85.21%	813.95	29.70%
India	647500.0	44.78%	7.36%	2.23%	90.41%	551.45	66.49%
Ireland	1540.8	3.14%	63.96%	33.58%	2.46%	312.04	21.64%
Iran	92950.0	72.33%	6.65%	1.18%	92.18%	1110.81	81.29%
Iraq	56614.0	160.84%	12.19%	9.70%	78.12%	1407.67	79.51%
Iceland	290.0	0.17%	28.75%	71.15%	0.11%	815.55	0.39%
Israel	1276.0	170.13%	43.48%	4.56%	51.96%	265.70	110.09%
Italy	33645.0	18.44%	27.12%	22.72%	50.16%	560.52	29.65%
Jamaica	1350.0	12.47%	10.34%	81.24%	8.42%	457.25	12.47%
Jordan	941.8	138.10%	45.02%	3.34%	51.65%	108.29	104.31%
Japan	78400.0	18.23%	18.88%	13.14%	67.98%	619.88	36.05%
Kazakhstan	24585.0	38.21%	18.82%	18.49%	62.69%	1308.22	34.10%
Kenya	4032.0	19.48%	12.28%	7.51%	80.21%	74.98	33.24%
Kyrgyzstan	7707.0	15.75%	2.92%	4.39%	92.69%	1174.09	50.04%
Cambodia	2184.0	1.81%	4.49%	1.51%	94.00%	48.56	1.04%
Saint Kitts and Nevis	12.2	50.83%	98.72%	0.00%	1.28%	293.24	50.83%
South Korea	29197.0	45.02%	24.64%	16.43%	58.93%	528.23	85.22%
Kuwait	770.1		35.86%	1.86%	62.27%	292.70	3 850.50%
Laos	7350.0	3.86%	1.77%	2.31%	95.92%	1010.23	4.79%
Lebanon	1812.0	37.75%	13.04%	48.91%	38.04%	269.58	58.79%
Liberia	145.9	0.07%	54.97%	36.60%	8.43%	28.85	0.26%
Libya	5720.0	817.14%	12.01%	4.80%	83.19%	848.46	817.14%
Saint Lucia	42.9	14.30%	29.14%	0.00%	70.86%	233.63	14.30%
Sri Lanka	12946.0	24.52%	6.22%	6.42%	87.36%	604.58	90.79%
Lesotho	43.8	0.84%	45.66%	45.66%	8.68%	20.45	2.57%
Lithuania	254.4	1.65%	53.81%	23.73%	22.46%	93.45	1.83%
Luxembourg	47.8	4.78%	100.00%	0.00%	0.00%	75.88	3.96%
Latvia	181.2	1.07%	48.93%	20.53%	30.53%	96.07	1.07%
Morocco	10573.0	36.46%	10.19%	2.03%	87.78%	282.60	50.75%
Monaco	5.0		100.00%	0.00%	0.00%	127.41	
Moldova	846.0	52.22%	20.00%	72.88%	6.88%	198.32	12.56%
Madagascar	13457.5	3.99%	2.91%	1.19%	95.89%	489.58	11.26%
Maldives	4.7	15.67%	94.92%	5.08%	0.00%	10.91	15.67%
Mexico	89548.0	21.89%	14.70%	9.55%	75.74%	694.53	44.82%
North Macedonia	1599.2	29.61%	65.10%	5.27%	29.63%	225.17	38.70%
Mali	5186.0	8.64%	2.06%	0.08%	97.86%	256.09	8.00%
Malta	41.3	81.86%	60.34%	1.58%	38.08%	143.31	81.86%
Myanmar	33231.0	3.31%	9.95%	1.49%	88.56%	613.70	5.80%
Montenegro	160.9		59.91%	39.03%	1.06%	256.18	
Mongolia	462.4	1.33%	9.80%	35.94%	54.26%	141.05	3.40%
Mozambique	1473.0	1.47%	25.25%	1.70%	73.05%	47.13	1.75%
Mauritania	1348.2	337.05%	7.07%	2.36%	90.58%	290.39	13.25%
Mauritius	607.0	22.06%	48.36%	1.48%	50.16%	478.07	22.06%
Malawi	1356.8	8.41%	10.55%	3.52%	85.94%	70.93	17.50%
Malaysia	6707.0	1.16%	24.45%	29.90%	45.65%	169.56	3.44%
Namibia	281.9	4.58%	25.35%	4.86%	69.79%	113.35	0.86%
Niger	2583.3	73.81%	7.48%	1.50%	91.02%	106.72	11.02%
Nigeria	12472.0	5.64%	40.08%	15.75%	44.17%	60.52	9.67%
Nicaragua	1273.0	0.81%	14.91%	0.05%	85.04%	192.41	2.22%
Netherlands	8306.0	75.51%	24.74%	71.56%	3.70%	484.74	16.80%
Norway	2691.1	0.70%	28.81%	39.80%	31.39%	496.42	2.05%
Nepal	9497.1	4.79%	1.55%	0.31%	98.14%	325.95	8.31%
New Zealand	9875.0	3.02%	10.20%	24.21%	65.59%	1013.98	8.05%
Oman	1634.0	116.71%	6.79%	12.43%	80.78%	375	116.71%
Pakistan	189590.0	344.71%	5.26%	0.76%	93.98%	830.50	116.31%
Panama	1211.4	0.89%	62.66%	0.51%	36.83%	280.76	0.90%
Peru	38550.0	2.35%	5.81%	9.11%	85.08%	1169.18	7.18%
Philippines	85867.1	17.93%	9.50%	11.51%	79.00%	783.59	26.25%
Papua New Guinea	392.1	0.05%	57.00%	42.74%	0.26%	43.82	0.13%
Poland	8667.0	16.17%	21.22%	63.70%	15.08%	243.41	30.00%
Puerto Rico	875.0	12.32%	24.31%	72.22%	3.47%	1144.59	19.54%
North Korea	8657.8	12.92%	10.43%	13.23%	76.35%	335.85	27.74%
Portugal	6129.5	16.13%	14.41%	29.83%	55.76%	601.46	12.32%
Paraguay	2413.0	2.06%	15.00%	6.38%	78.62%	338.31	1.84%
Palestine	352.4	43.40%	44.09%	7.78%	48.13%	87.90	50.26%
Qatar	250.0	446.43%	59.49%	4.41%	36.44%	306.67	431.03%
Romania	6416.0	15.14%	16.91%	60.85%	22.24%	333.51	6.01%
Russia	64820.0	1.50%	26.46%	44.79%	28.76%	444.17	4.12%
Rwanda	610.0	6.42%	38.33%	1.67%	60.00%	46.32	20.20%
Saudi Arabia	23380.0	974.17%	13.05%	5.39%	81.56%	746.60	974.17%
Sudan	26935.0	673.38%	3.53%	0.28%	96.19%	614.26	118.66%
Senegal	3061.6	11.87%	8.64%	0.05%	91.31%	180.43	16.28%
Singapore	498.7	83.12%	45.00%	51.00%	4.00%	112.81	83.12%
Sierra Leone	212.2	0.13%	52.31%	26.15%	21.54%	26.60	0.50%
El Salvador	389.1	2.49%	22.38%	10.06%	67.56%	326.54	2.43%
Somalia	3298.0	54.97%	0.45%	0.06%	99.48%	207.51	24.53%
Serbia	5324.5	63.33%	12.72%	74.87%	12.41%	609.39	6.00%
South Sudan	658.0	2.53%	29.33%	34.19%	36.47%	58.78	4.23%
São Tomé and Príncipe	40.9	1.88%	35.94%	1.47%	62.59%	186.62	1.88%
Suriname	615.9	0.62%	8.00%	22.00%	70.00%	1049.89	3.95%
Slovakia	555.0	4.40%	52.81%	41.87%	5.32%	101.66	2.39%
Slovenia	1003.0	5.37%	16.93%	82.77%	0.30%	482.94	6.78%
Sweden	2483.0	1.45%	28.14%	51.01%	4.11%	245.96	3.58%
Eswatini	1068.0	40.45%	3.87%	1.94%	94.19%	920.56	77.56%
Seychelles	11.3		65.69%	27.74%	6.57%	139.30	
Syria	13964.4	195.80%	8.80%	3.67%	87.53%	957.70	124.36%
Chad	879.6	5.86%	11.79%	11.79%	76.42%	53.55	4.29%
Togo	223.0	1.94%	63.09%	2.83%	34.08%	273.81	3.39%
Thailand	57307.0	25.53%	4.78%	4.85%	90.37%	888.93	23.01%
Tajikistan	10602.0	16.71%	9.21%	16.26%	74.53%	1037.99	69.94%
Turkmenistan	26245.0	1867.97%	1.73%	3.07%	61.42%	2740.93	135.21%
Timor-Leste	1172.0	14.27%	8.45%	0.17%	91.38%	26.94	28.27%
Trinidad and Tobago	336.2	8.76%	62.00%	33.64%	4.36%	303.54	20.33%
Tunisia	3864.0	92.11%	22.73%	1.73%	75.54%	292.49	98.11%
Turkey	61533.6	27.11%	11.10%	1.66%	87.24%	737.58	45.71%
Tanzania	5184.0	6.17%	10.17%	0.48%	89.35%	821	12.96%
Uganda	637.0	1.63%	51.49%	7.85%	40.66%	225.68	5.83%
Ukraine	9459.0	17.17%	28.06%	40.93%	30.99%	503.65	12.26%
Uruguay	3660.0	3.97%	11.20%	2.19%	86.61%	1053.62	9.79%
United States	444396.1	15.77%	13.14%	47.20%	39.66%	1342.26	28.16%
Uzbekistan	58904.0	360.49%	4.09%	3.62%	92.29%	1759.83	168.92%
Saint Vincent and the Grenadines	7.9	7.90%	99.98%	0.02%	0.00%	76.64	7.90%
Venezuela	22621.1	2.81%	22.64%	3.51%	73.85%	795.69	7.54%
Vietnam	81862.0	22.78%	1.47%	3.75%	94.78%	842.73	18.13%
Yemen	3565.0	169.76%	7.43%	1.82%	90.74%	119.53	169.76%
South Africa	20310.0	45.33%	16.21%	21.31%	62.48%	323.54	65.03%
Zambia	1572.0	1.96%	18.45%	8.27%	73.28%	85.51	2.84%
Zimbabwe	3771.4	30.76%	17.21%	2.16%	80.64%	253.74	35.41%
(United Nations) WORLD	3895525.3	9.11%	13.08%	15.37%	71.31%		
Caribbean small states	4019.3	1.08%	13.77%	34.66%	51.56%		
Pacific island small states			29.80%	11.31%	58.89%		
Least developed countries: UN classification	198860.4	4.38%	7.61%	1.74%	90.65%		
Low & middle income (WB)	3002424.4	9.46%	11.92%	8.46%	79.31%		
Low-income	110611.0	4.15%	7.19%	2.51%	90.30%		
Middle-income (WB)	2882577.0	9.90%	12.13%	8.70%	78.85%		
Lower middle income (WB)	1656886.0	18.35%	8.30%	3.62%	88.08%		
Upper middle income (WB)	1225691.0	6.10%	17.31%	15.58%	66.38%		
High-income	870479.7	8.53%	16.83%	39.49%	43.64%		
European Union	183700.1	13.51%	23.26%	45.33%	31.20%		
OECD (Organisation for Economic Cooperation and Development)	1011069.3	7.93%	16.09%	34.32%	49.55%		
