= Coat of arms of Colombia =

- Armiger: Republic of Colombia
- Adopted: 1924
- Crest: Andean condor proper with wings inverted displayed, facing dexter with an olive branch on bill, a ribbon in base
- Shield: Tierced per fess Azure, Argent and Azure, in centre chief a Pomegranate between in sinister chief a Cornucopia overflowing with coins and in dexter chief a cornucopia overflowing with fruits and vegetables proper, in center point a Phrygian cap Gules held on a Lance proper, in base the Isthmus of Panama Vert fesswise between two Ships Sable, sailed Argent.
- Supporters: Flags of Colombia
- Motto: Libertad y Orden "Liberty and Order"

The coat of arms of Colombia contains a shield with numerous symbols. Perched on top of the shield is an Andean condor, symbolizing freedom, holding an olive crown. The national motto, "Libertad y Orden" (Spanish for Liberty and Order), is written in black on a golden scroll, waving in between the condor and the shield. The condor is looking to its right with its wings extended.

== Description ==
The national flag is draped on each side of the shield. The shield is broken into three portions. In the lowermost portion is a depiction of two ships, indicating the maritime history of Colombia — mainly to the Isthmus of Panama — which was part of Colombia until 1903. Nowadays, it represents the two oceans that border the country (Atlantic and Pacific). The sails symbolize the Colombian commerce with the rest of the world and the rising economy. In the middle section, over a field of silver (argent), the Phrygian cap is presented, it being a traditional symbol of liberty and freedom. The topmost section contains a pomegranate over an azure field, as a symbol of the Viceroyalty of New Granada (the colonial name of Colombia back in the 18th century), in the middle flanked by two cornucopias: the left one with golden and silver coins and the right one with tropical fruits, representing the mineral and agricultural wealth of Colombian soil.

The coat of arms of the Republic was designed by Francisco de Paula Santander, and was adopted via Act 3 of 9 May 1834, with later non-essential modifications according to Ordinance 861 of 1924.

== Gallery ==
National coat of arms

Heraldic coat of arms of Colombia

Regulated coat of arms of Colombia

Common coat of arms in use

Historical coats of arms

Arms of the Viceroyalty of New Granada (1717–1819)

Arms of the United Provinces of New Granada (1814) (provisional)

Arms of the United Provinces of New Granada (1814–1816)

Arms of Gran Colombia (1819)

Arms of Gran Colombia (1820)

Arms of Gran Colombia (1821–1830)

Arms of Gran Colombia (proposal)

Arms of the State of New Granada (1830–1834)

Arms of the Republic of New Granada (1833) (proposal)

Arms of the Republic of New Granada (1834–1858)

Arms of the Republic of New Granada (1854) (provisional)

Arms of the Republic of New Granada (1854) (provisional)

Arms of the Granadine Confederation (1858–1861)

Arms of the United States of Colombia (1861–1886)

Arms of the Republic of Colombia (1886–1924)

Arms of the Republic of Colombia (1924–present)

Other versions

== See also ==
- Flag of Colombia
- National Anthem of Colombia

== Bibliography ==
- Ortega Ricaurte, Enrique (1954). Heráldica Nacional (in Spanish). Banco de la República, Bogotá. OCLC 253691402.
- García, Júlio Cesar (2000). Himnos y Símbolos de Nuestra Colombia (in Spanish). Camer Editores, Bogotá. ISBN 958-33-1489-7.
- Castrillón M., Aurelio (1961). Historial de las Banderas y Escudos Nacionales (in Spanish). Revista de las Fuerzas Armadas de Colombia, Bogotá. OCLC 39268995.
- Instituto Geográfico Agustín Codazzi - Ministerio de Hacienda y Crédito Público (1989). Atlas Básico de Colombia (in Spanish). División de Difusión Geográfica, Bogotá. No exist ISBN.
