= National flag =

Flag of a country or nation

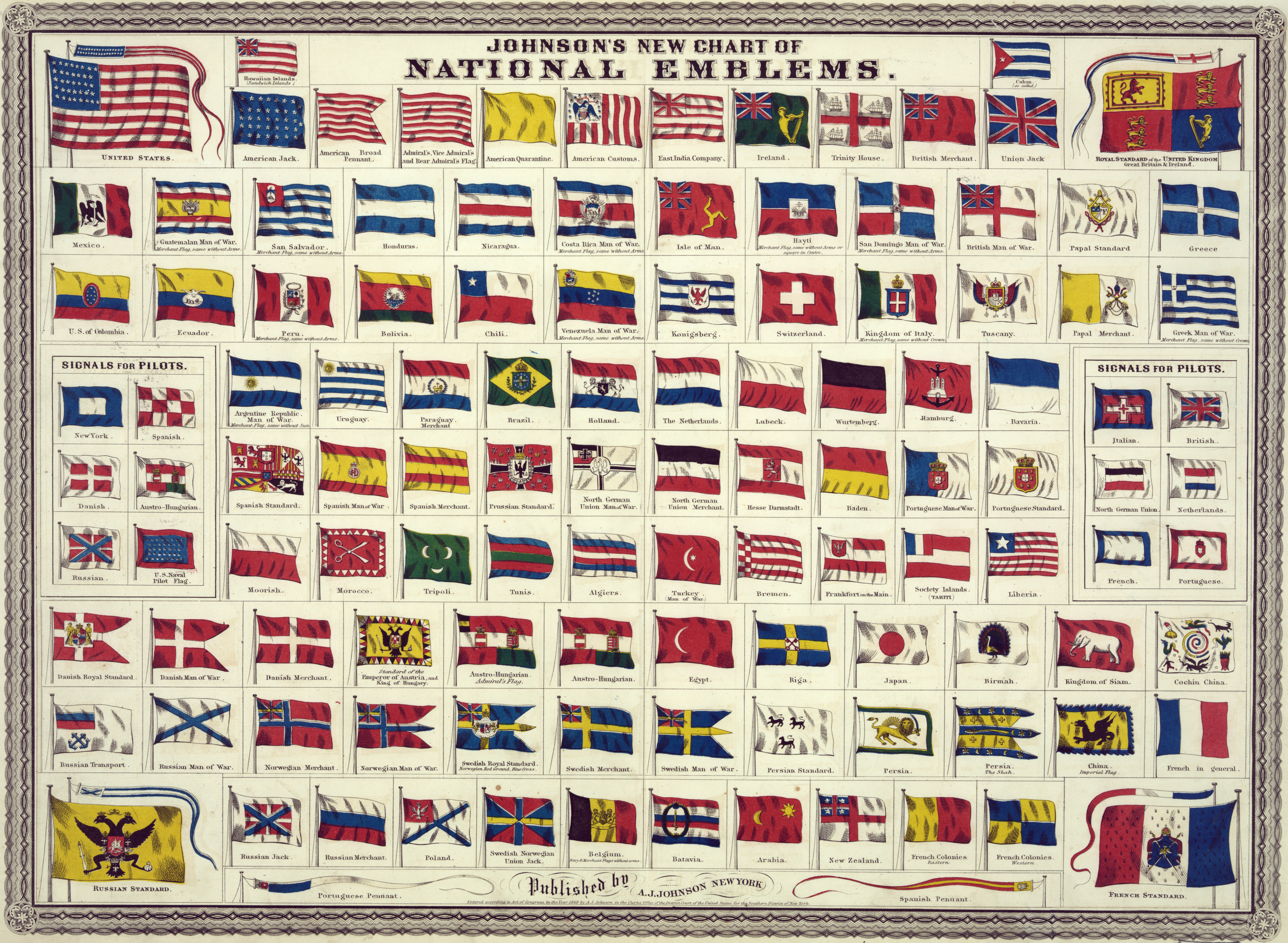
Johnson's new chart of national emblems, published c. 1868. The large flags shown in the corners are the 37-star flag of the United States (flown 1867–1890), upper left; the Royal Standard of the United Kingdom, upper, right; the Russian Imperial Standard, lower left; and the French tricolore with inset Imperial Eagle, lower right. Various other flags flown by ships are shown. The Flag of Cuba is labelled "Cuban (so called)". The Chinese dragon on the Flag of China was drawn mistakenly as a welsh dragon.

A national flag is a flag that represents and symbolizes a given nation. It is flown by the government of that nation, but can also be flown by its citizens. A national flag is typically designed with specific meanings for its colors and symbols, which may also be used separately from the flag as a symbol of the nation. The design of a national flag is sometimes altered after the occurrence of important historical events.

== History ==
Historically, flags originated as military standards, used as field signs. Throughout history, various examples of such proto-flags exist: the white cloth banners of the Zhou dynasty's armies in the 11th century BC, the vexillum standards flown by the armies of the Roman Empire, the Black Standard famously carried by Muhammad which later became the flag of the Abbasid Caliphate, and the various "Raven banners" flown by Viking chieftains. Angelino Dulcert published a series of comprehensive Portolan charts in the 14th century AD, which famously showcased the flags of several polities depicted – although these are not uniformly "national flags", as some were likely the personal standards of the respective nation's rulers.

The practice of flying flags indicating the country of origin outside of the context of warfare became common with the maritime flag. During the 13th century, the republics of Genoa and Venice both used maritime flags; William Gordon Perrin wrote that the republic of Genoa was "one of the earliest states to adopt a national flag".

The current design of the flag of the Netherlands originates as a variant of the late 16th century orange-white-blue Prinsenvlag ("Prince's Flag"), that was used in the Dutch War of Independence (1568–1648), evolving in the early 17th century as the red-white-blue Statenvlag ("States Flag"), the naval flag of the States-General of the Dutch Republic, making the Dutch flag perhaps the oldest tricolour flag in continuous use, although standardisation of the exact colours is of a much later date.

During the Age of Sail in the early 17th century, the Union Jack finds its origins, when James VI of Scotland inherited the English and Irish thrones (as James I). On 12 April 1606, the new flag representing this regal union between England and Scotland was specified in a royal decree, according to which the flag of England (a red cross on a white background, known as St George's Cross), and the flag of Scotland (a white saltire on a blue background, known as the Saltire or St Andrew's Cross), would be joined, forming the flag of Great Britain and first Union Flag - but then without the red Cross of St. Patrick. It continued in use until 1 January 1801, the effective date of the legislative union of Great Britain and Ireland, when the Cross of St. Patrick (a red diagonal cross on white) was incorporated into the flag, giving the Union Jack its current design.

With the emergence of nationalist sentiment from the late 18th century national flags began to be displayed in civilian contexts as well. Notable early examples include the US flag, which was first adopted as a naval ensign in 1777 but began to be displayed as a generic symbol of the United States after the American Revolution, and the French Tricolor, which became a symbol of the Republic in the 1790s.

Most countries of Europe standardised and codified the designs of their maritime flags as national flags, in the course of the 19th and early 20th centuries. The specifications of the flag of Denmark, based on a flag that was in continuous use since the 14th-century, were codified in 1748, as a rectangular flag with certain proportions, replacing the variant with a split (swallow-tail). The flag of Switzerland was introduced in 1889, also based on medieval war flags.

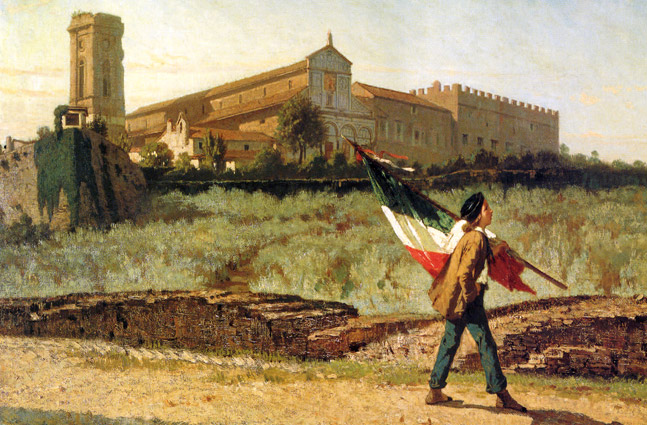
The first Italian flag brought to Florence by Francesco Saverio Altamura (1859)

In Europe, the red-white-blue tricolour design of the flag of the Kingdom of the Netherlands became popular, since it was associated with a republican form of government through that country's long war of independence against the Spanish Crown. That association was greatly reinforced after the French Revolution (1789), when France used the same colours, but with vertical instead of horizontal stripes. Other countries in Europe (like Ireland, Italy, Romania and Estonia) and in South and Central America selected tricolours of their own to express their adherence to the principles of liberty, equality, and fraternity as embodied in the French flag, although some adopted a monarchical form of government with a constitution instead of a republican government.

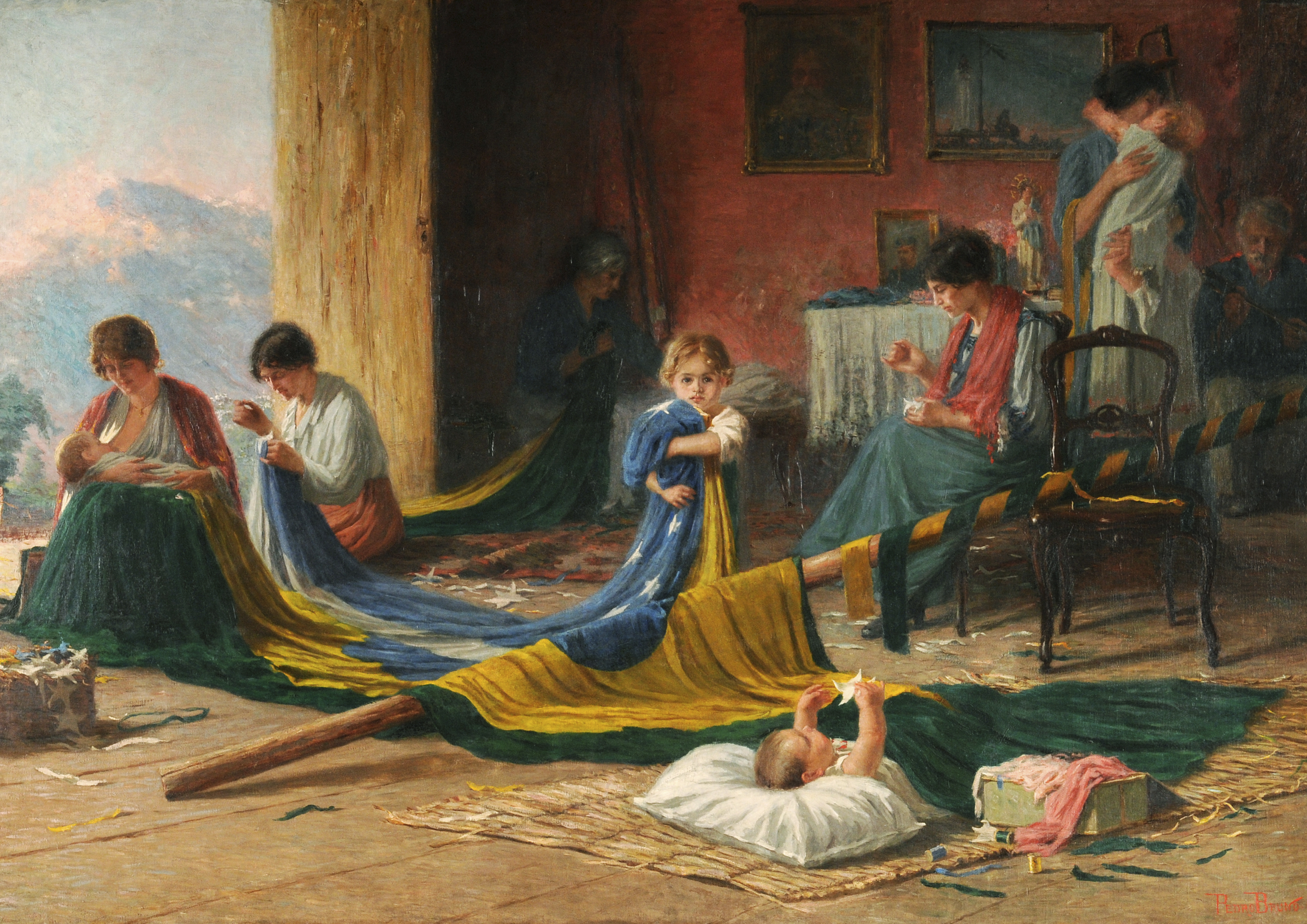
A 1919 painting by Pedro Bruno depicting a family embroidering the Brazilian flag

The Ottoman flag (now the flag of Turkey) was adopted in 1844. Other non-European powers followed the trend in the late 19th century, the flag of Great Qing being introduced in 1862, that of Japan being introduced in 1870. Also in the 19th century, most countries of South America introduced a flag as they became independent (Peru in 1820, Bolivia in 1851, Colombia in 1860, Brazil in 1822, etc.)

== Process of adoption ==
The national flag is often mentioned or described in a country's constitution, but its detailed description may be delegated to a flag law passed by the legislature, or even secondary legislation or in monarchies a decree.

Thus, the national flag is mentioned briefly in the Basic Law for the Federal Republic of Germany of 1949 "the federal flag is black-red-gold" (art. 22.2 Die Bundesflagge ist schwarz-rot-gold), but its proportions were regulated in a document passed by the government in the following year. The Flag of the United States is not defined in the constitution but rather in a separate Flag Resolution passed in 1777.

Minor design changes of national flags are often passed on a legislative or executive level, while substantial changes have constitutional character. The design of the flag of Serbia omitting the communist star of the flag of Yugoslavia was a decision made in the 1992 Serbian constitutional referendum, but the adoption of a coat of arms within the flag was based on a government "recommendation" in 2003, adopted legislatively in 2009 and again subject to a minor design change in 2010. The flag of the United States underwent numerous changes because the number of stars represents the number of states, proactively defined in a Flag Act of 1818 to the effect that "on the admission of every new state into the Union, one star be added to the union of the flag"; it was changed most recently in 1960 with the accession of Hawaii.

In 1946, Italy removed the arms of Savoy from its flag following the abolition of the monarchy in a constitutional referendum.
In 2024, Syria replaced the Ba'ath-era flag with a 2:3 version of the modified independence flag, also known as the revolution flag, following the overthrow of the Assad regime during the Syrian civil war.

A change in national flag is often due to a change of regime, especially following a civil war or revolution. In such cases, the military origins of the national flag and its connection to political ideology (form of government, monarchy vs. republic vs. theocracy, etc.) remains visible. In such cases national flags acquire the status of a political symbol.

The flag of Germany, for instance, was a tricolour of black-white-red under the German Empire, inherited from the North German Confederation (1866). The Weimar Republic that followed adopted a black-red-gold tricolour. Nazi Germany went back to black-white-red in 1933 before replacing it with a modified version of the Nazi party flag in 1935, and black-red-gold was reinstituted by the two successor states, West Germany and East Germany, with East Germany's flag being defaced with Communist symbols, following World War II. Following the reunification of Germany, the East German flag was retired from official use in favor of the plain West German tricolour. Subsequently, the East German flag became a symbol of Ostalgie, while the imperial tricolour became a symbol of the German far-right. Similarly, the flags of Libya and Syria introduced with the nations' independence were abandoned following the 1969 Libyan revolution and the 1963 Syrian coup d'état, respectively. They were used again by anti-government forces during civil wars in the midst of the Arab Spring before being reinstated as the national flags following said forces' victories in 2011 and 2024, respectively.

== Usage ==
The Flag of Cyprus uses its own map for its flag

There are three distinct types of national flag for use on land, and three for use at sea, though many countries use identical designs for several (and sometimes all) of these types of flag.

=== On land ===
On land, there is a distinction between civil flags (FIAV symbol), state flags, and war or military flags. Civil flags may be flown by anyone regardless of whether they are linked to government, whereas state flags are those used officially by government agencies. War flags (also called military flags) are used by military organizations such as Armies, Marine Corps, or Air Forces.

In practice, many countries (such as the United States and the United Kingdom) have identical flags for these three purposes; national flag is sometimes used as a vexillological term to refer to such a three-purpose flag. In a number of countries, however, and notably those in Latin America, there is a distinction between civil and state flags. In most cases, the civil flag is a simplified version of the state flag, with the difference often being the presence of a coat of arms on the state flag that is absent from the civil flag.

Very few countries use a war flag that differs from the state flag. Taiwan, Japan, and China are notable examples of this. Swallow-tailed flags are used as war flags and naval ensigns in Nordic countries and charged versions as presidential or royal standards. The Philippines does not have a distinctive war flag in this usual sense, but the flag of the Philippines is legally unique in that it is flown with the red stripe on top when the country is in a state of war, rather than the conventional blue.

Civil flag of Austria

State flag of Austria

Flag of Taiwan

=== At sea ===
The flag that indicates nationality on a ship is called an ensign. As with the national flags, there are three varieties: the civil ensign, flown by private vessels; state ensigns (also called government ensigns;), flown by government ships; and war ensigns (also called naval ensigns;), flown by naval vessels. The ensign is flown from an ensign-staff at the stern of the ship, or from a gaff when underway. Both these positions are superior to any other on the ship, even though the masthead is higher. In the absence of a gaff the ensign may be flown from the yardarm. (See Maritime flags.) National flags may also be flown by aircraft and the land vehicles of important officials. In the case of aircraft, those flags are usually painted on, and those are usually to be painted on in the position as if they were blowing in the wind.

In some countries, such as the United States and Canada (except for the Royal Canadian Navy's Ensign), the national ensign is identical to the national flag, while in others, such as the United Kingdom, India, Italy, Japan and Thailand, there are specific ensigns for maritime use. Most countries do not have a separate state ensign, although the United Kingdom is a rare exception, in having a Red Ensign for civil use, a White Ensign as its naval ensign, and a Blue Ensign for government non-military vessels. Italian naval ensign bears the arms of the Italian Navy: a shield, surmounted by a turreted and rostrum crown, which brings together in four parts the arms of four ancient maritime republics (Republic of Venice, Republic of Genoa, Republic of Pisa and Republic of Amalfi).

The naval ensign of the United Kingdom

The Indian Naval Ensign, also referred to as the Indian White Ensign, or Nishaan, is the naval ensign of the Indian Navy

The naval ensign of Italy

Naval ensign of the Imperial Japanese Navy and the Japan Maritime Self-Defense Force

Royal Navy Thai Flag Naval ensign Emblem White Elephant

=== Protocol ===
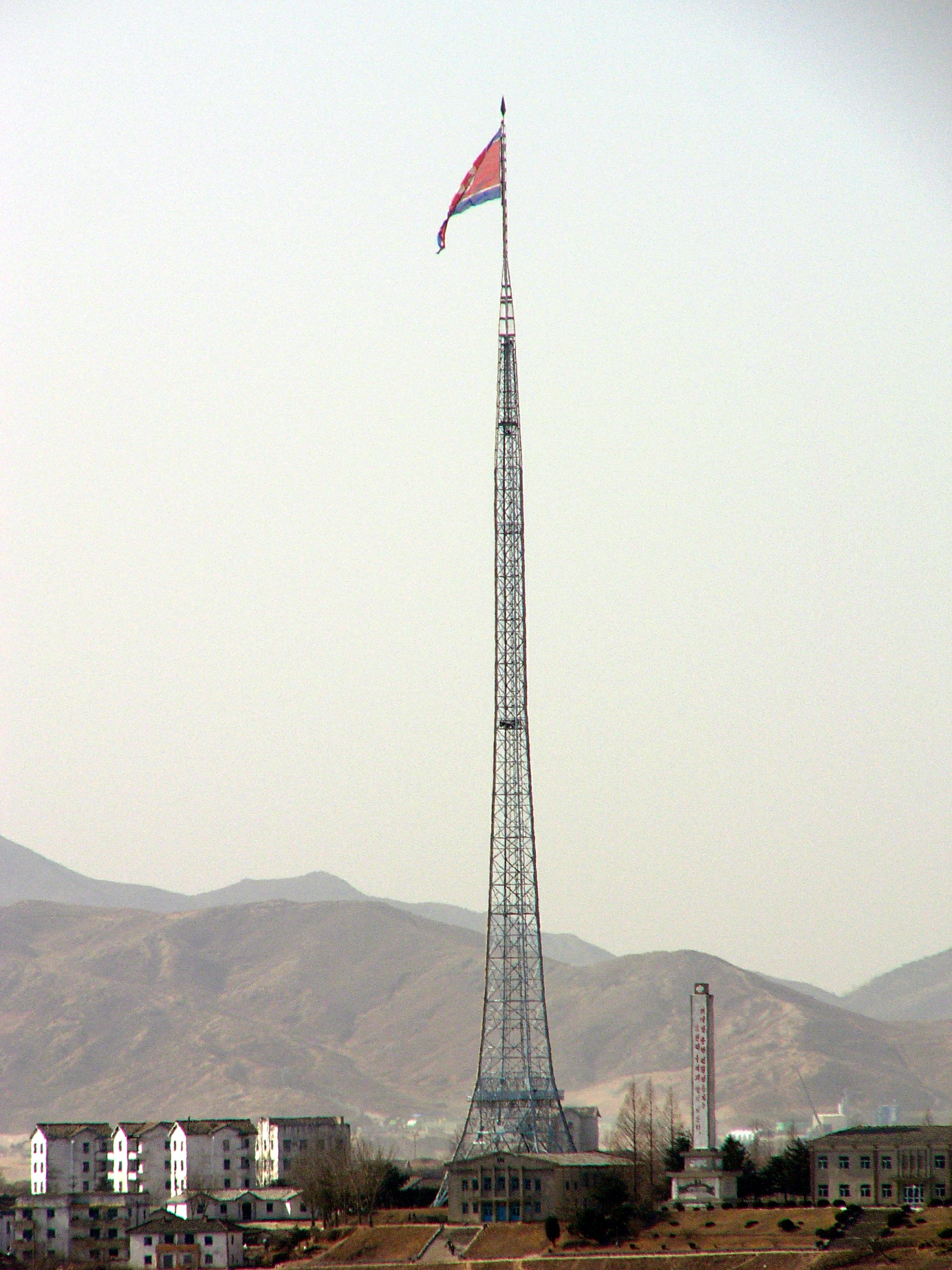
The world's sixth tallest flagpole flying a 270 kg (595 lb) Flag of North Korea. It is 160 m (525 ft) in height, over Kijŏng-dong ("Peace village") near Panmunjom, the border of North Korea and South Korea.

There is a great deal of protocol involved in the proper display of national flags. A general rule is that the national flag should be flown in the position of honour, and not in an inferior position to any other flag (although some countries make an exception for royal standards). The following rules are typical of the conventions when flags are flown on land:

- When a national flag is displayed together with any other flags, it must be hoisted first and lowered last.
- When a national flag is displayed together with the national flags of other countries, all the flags should be of approximately equal size and must be flown at an equal height, although the national flag of the host country should be flown in the position of honour (in the centre of an odd number of flagpoles or at the far right — left from an observer's point of view — of an even number of flagpoles).
- The flags of Saudi Arabia, Iraq, Iran, and Afghanistan are often wrapped from left to right (which appears right to left from an observer's point of view) because they contain Arabic text that must be displayed correctly.
- When a national flag is displayed together with flags other than national flags, it should be flown on a separate flagpole, either higher or in the position of honour.
- When a national flag is displayed together with any other flags on the same flagpole, it must be at the top, though separate flagpoles are preferable.
- When a national flag is displayed together with any other flag on crossed flagpoles, the national flag must be on the observer's left and its flagpole must be in front of the flagpole of the other flag.
- When a national flag is displayed together with another flag or flags in procession, the national flag must be on the marching right. If there is a row of flags, it should be in the position of honour.
- When a national flag, with some exceptions, is flown upside down it indicates distress. This however is merely tradition. It is not a recognised distress signal according to the International regulations for preventing collisions at sea. Further, a nation's flag is commonly flown inverted as a sign of protest or contempt against the country concerned. As of now, only the flag of the Philippines recognises the distress symbolism of the reverse flag.

=== Hanging a flag vertically ===
Most flags are hung vertically by rotating the flag pole. However, some countries have specific protocols for this purpose or even have special flags for vertical hanging; usually rotating some elements of the flag — such as the coat of arms — so that they are seen in an upright position.

Examples of countries that have special protocol for vertical hanging are: Canada, Czech Republic, Greece, Israel, the Philippines, South Africa, and the United States (reverse always showing); and the United Kingdom (obverse always showing).

Examples of countries that have special designs for vertical hanging are: Austria, Cambodia (coat of arms must be rotated 90° and blue strips are narrowed), Dominica (coat of arms must be rotated and reverse always showing), Germany, Hungary, Liechtenstein (crown must be rotated 90°), Mexico, Montenegro (coat of arms must be rotated 90° to normal position), Nepal, Slovakia (coat of arms must be rotated 90° to normal position), and Saudi Arabia (shahada must be rotated 90°). A vertical banner is used instead of the horizontal flag for Malaysia.

Vertical variation of the flag of Cambodia.

Vertical variation of the flag of Dominica.

Vertical variation of the flag of Germany.

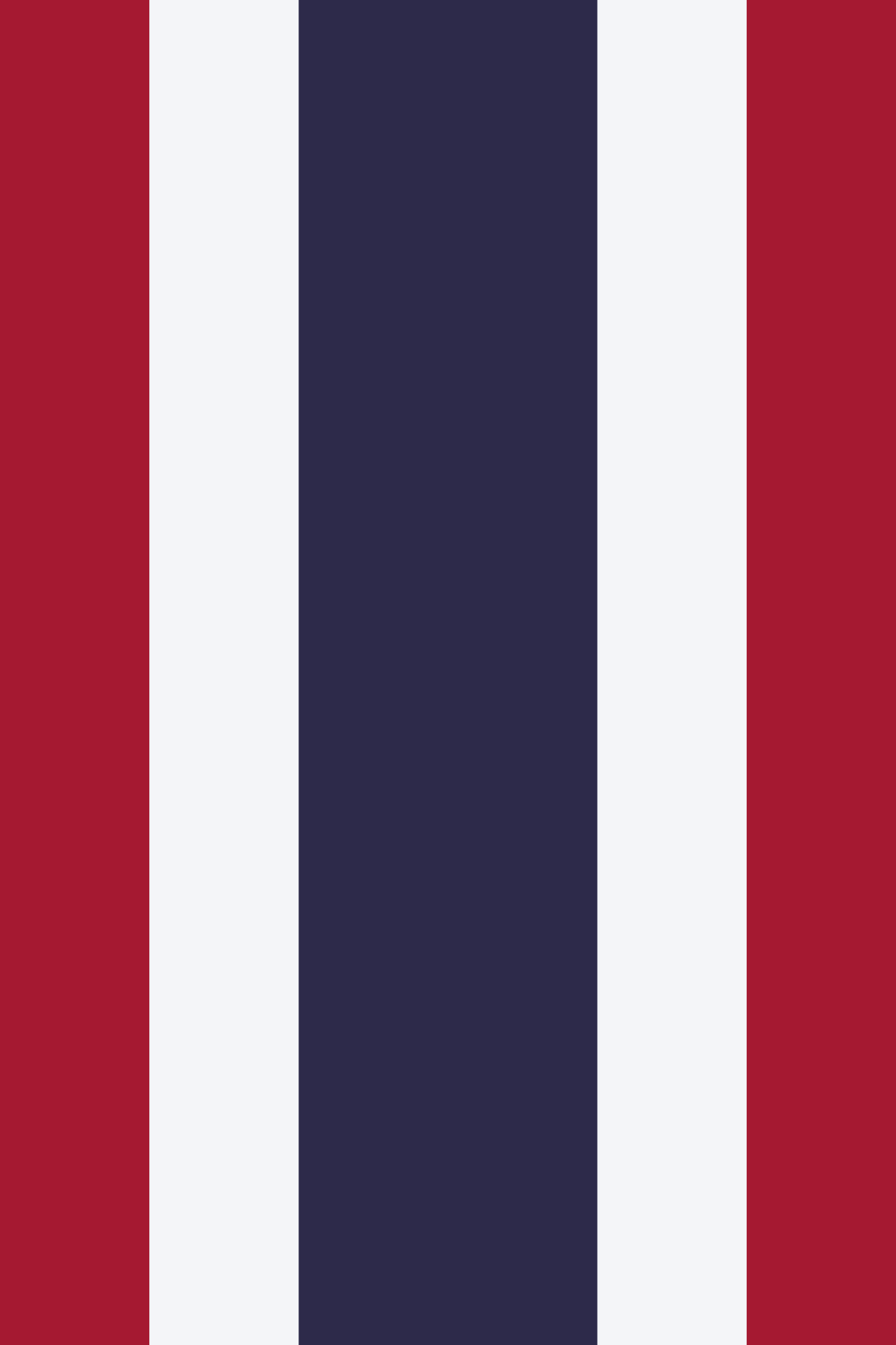
Vertical variation of the flag of Thailand.

Vertical variation of the flag of Hungary.

Vertical variation of the flag of Italy.

Vertical variation of the flag of Liechtenstein.

Vertical variation of the flag of Montenegro.

Vertical variation of the flag of Nepal.

Vertical variation of the flag of Slovakia.

Vertical variation of the flag of Saudi Arabia.

Vertical banner variation of the flag of Malaysia.

== Design ==
The flag of Nepal is the only national flag which is not a quadrilateral.

The art and practice of designing flags is known as vexillography. The design of national flags has seen a number of customs become apparent.

Most national flags are rectangular, or have a rectangular common variant, with the most notable exception being the flag of Nepal. The ratios of height to width vary among national flags, but none is taller than it is wide, again except for the flag of Nepal. The flags of Switzerland and the Vatican City are the only national flags which are exact squares.

The obverse and reverse of all national flags are either identical or mirrored, except for the flag of Paraguay and the partially recognized Sahrawi Arab Democratic Republic. See Flags whose reverse differs from the obverse for a list of exceptions including non-national flags.

As of 2011 all national flags consist of at least two different colours. In many cases, the different colours are presented in either horizontal or vertical bands. It is particularly common for colours to be presented in bands of three.

The Cambodian flag features a depiction of Angkor Wat in the center, a temple historically associated with both Hinduism and Buddhism.

It is common for many flags to feature national symbols, such as coats of arms. National patterns are present in some flags. Variations in design within a national flag can be common in the flag's upper left quarter, or canton. A third of the world's 196 countries currently have national flags that include religious symbols. This has led to controversy in some secular states in regard to the separation of church and state, when the national symbol is officially sanctioned by a government.

=== Colours ===
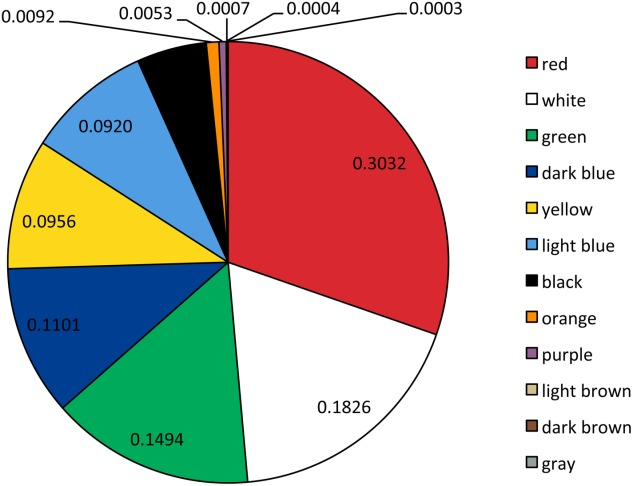
Distribution of colours in national flags

The most common colours in national flags are red, white, green, dark blue, yellow, light blue, and black. The only national flag not to include the colors red, white, or blue is Jamaica's. The occurrence of each colour in all the flags is listed in detail in the table below. The table shows that the colours light brown, dark brown and grey are only present in very small quantities. To be more precise these colours are currently only present in some of the symbols found within a few flags, such as in the case of the Spanish flag.

Colour	Percentage of Flags	Count of flags
red	76.14%	150
white	71.57%	141
blue	51.78%	102
yellow/gold	45.18%	89
green	44.67%	88
black	30.46%	60
orange	4.57%	9
brown	4.06%	8
gray	3.05%	6
purple	1.52%	3

=== Similarities ===
Blue, yellow and red striped flags
Flags from top left to bottom right:
Chad, Romania, Andorra and Moldova

Although the national flag is meant to be a unique symbol representing a nation, many countries have highly similar flags. Examples include the flags of Monaco and Indonesia, which differ only slightly in proportion and the tint of red; the flags of the Netherlands and Luxembourg, which differ in proportion as well as in the tint of blue used; the flags of Romania and Chad, which differ only in the tint of blue, and the flags of Cuba and Puerto Rico, which differ only in proportion, placement and tint of colors.

Flag of Cuba with 1:2 proportion

Flag of Puerto Rico with 2:3 proportion

The flags of Ireland and Ivory Coast and the flags of Mali and Guinea are (aside from shade or ratio differences) vertically mirrored versions from each other. This means that the reverse of one flag matches the obverse of the other. Unlike horizontally mirrored flags (like Poland and Indonesia) the direction in which these flags fly is crucial to identify them.

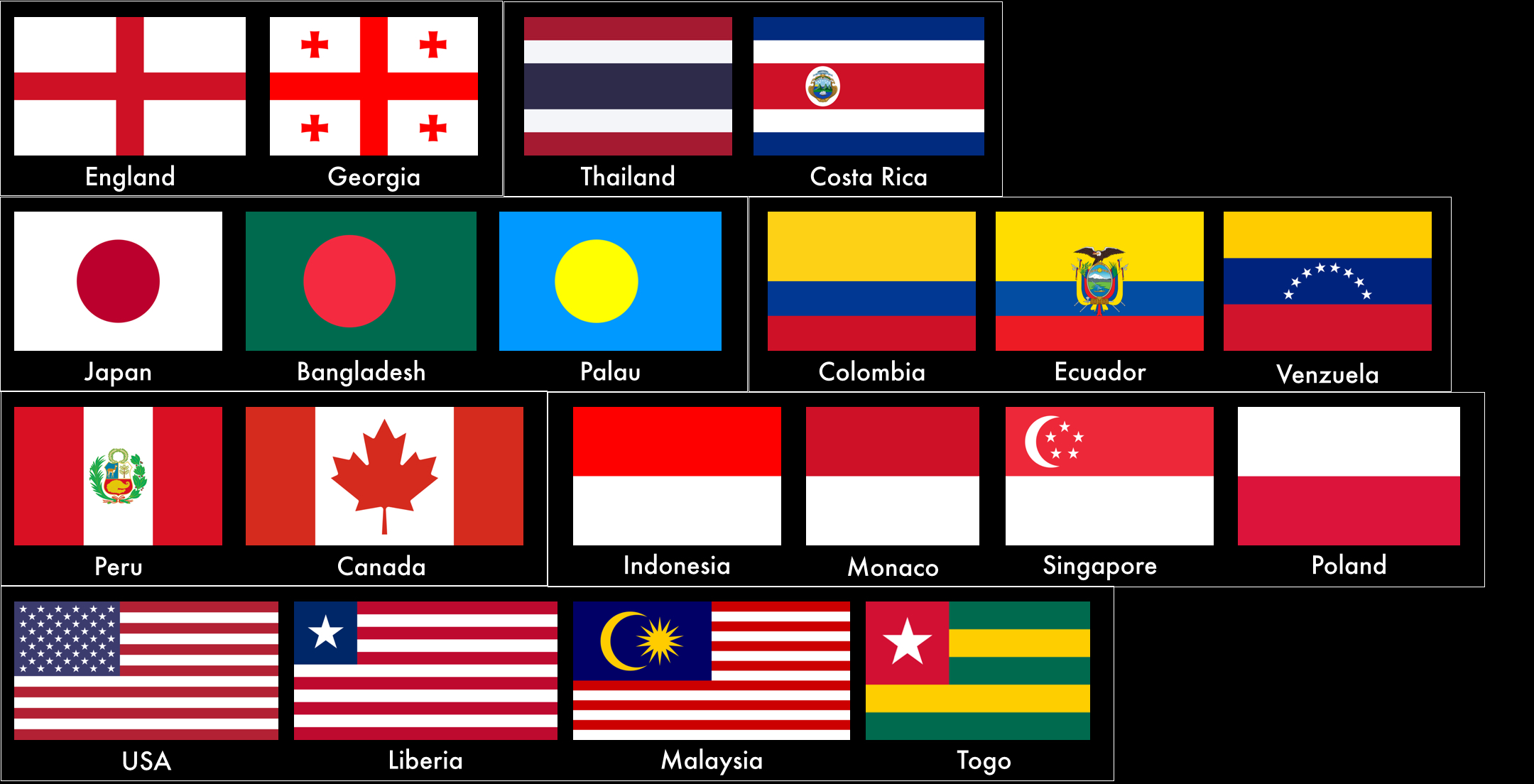
Image showing many similar flags

There are three colour combinations that are used on several flags in certain regions. Blue, white, and red is a common combination in Slavic countries such as the Czech Republic, Slovakia, Russia, Serbia, Slovenia, and Croatia as well as among Western nations including Australia, France, Iceland, the Netherlands, New Zealand, Norway, the United Kingdom, and the United States. Many African nations use the Pan-African colours of red, yellow, and green, including Cameroon, Ethiopia, Ghana, Guinea, Mali and Senegal. Flags containing red, white, and black (a subset of the Pan-Arab colours) can be found particularly among the Arab nations such as Egypt, Iraq, Sudan and Yemen.

Comparison of similarities of the Italian and Mexican flags

Due to the common arrangement of the same colours, at first sight, it seems that the only difference between the Italian and the Mexican flag is only the coat of arms of Mexico present in the latter; in reality the Italian tricolour uses lighter shades of green and red, and has different proportions than the Mexican flag—those of the Italian flag are equal to 2:3, while the proportions of the Mexican flag are 4:7. The similarity between the two flags posed a serious problem in maritime transport, given that originally the Mexican mercantile flag was devoid of arms and therefore was consequently identical to the Italian Republican tricolour of 1946; to obviate the inconvenience, at the request of the International Maritime Organization, both Italy and Mexico adopted naval flags with different crests.

Many other similarities may be found among current national flags, particularly if inversions of colour schemes are considered, e.g., compare the flag of Senegal to that of Cameroon and Indonesia to Poland and Monaco. Also the flag of Italy and the flag of Hungary use the same colours, although the order and direction differ (the Italian flag is vertical green-white-red and the Hungarian flag is horizontal red-white-green). The same goes for the flag of France and the flag of the Netherlands (the French flag is vertical blue-white-red and the Dutch flag is horizontal red-white-blue).

==== Flag families ====
While some similarities are coincidental, others are part of a flag family, flags rooted in shared histories. For example, the flags of Colombia, of Ecuador, and of Venezuela all use variants of the flag of Gran Colombia, the country they composed upon their independence from Spain, created by the Venezuelan independence hero Francisco de Miranda; and the flags of Kuwait, of Jordan, and of Palestine are all highly similar variants of the flag of the Arab revolt of 1916–1918. The flags of Romania and Moldova are virtually the same, because of the common history and heritage. Moldova adopted the Romanian flag during the declaration of independence from the USSR in 1991 (and was used in various demonstrations and revolts by the population) and later the Moldovan coat of arms (which is part of the Romanian coat of arms) was placed in the centre of the flag. All Nordic countries, with the exception of Greenland, use the Nordic Cross design (Iceland, Denmark, Norway, Sweden, Finland, in addition to the autonomous regions of the Faroe Islands and Åland), a horizontal cross shifted to the left on a single-coloured background. The United States and United Kingdom both have red, white, and blue. This similarity is due to the fact that the first 13 states of the U.S. were formerly colonies of the United Kingdom. Some similarities to the United States flag with the red and white stripes are noted as well such as the flag of Malaysia and the flag of Liberia, the latter of which was an American resettlement colony. Also, several former colonies of the United Kingdom, such as Australia, Fiji and New Zealand include the Union Jack in the top left corner.

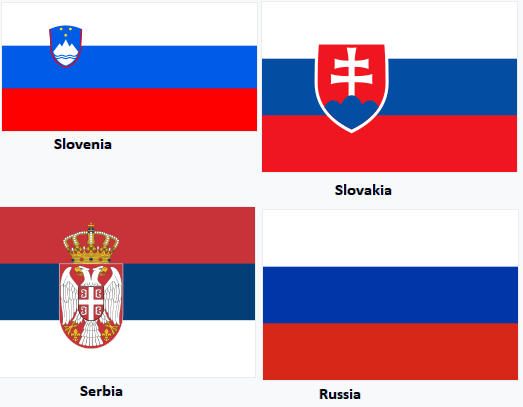
Slavic countries flag family.

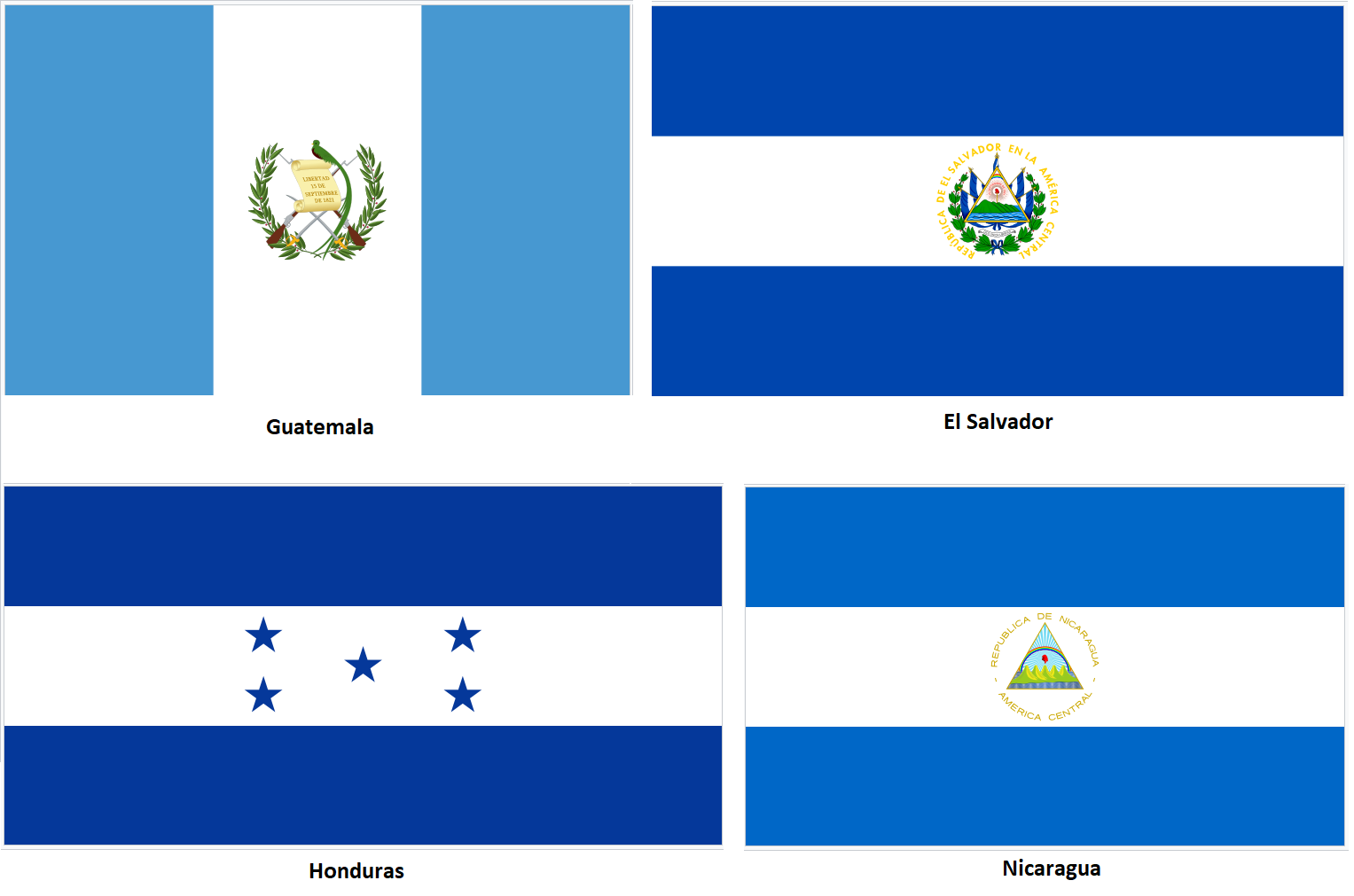
Former Federal Republic of Central America countries flags family.

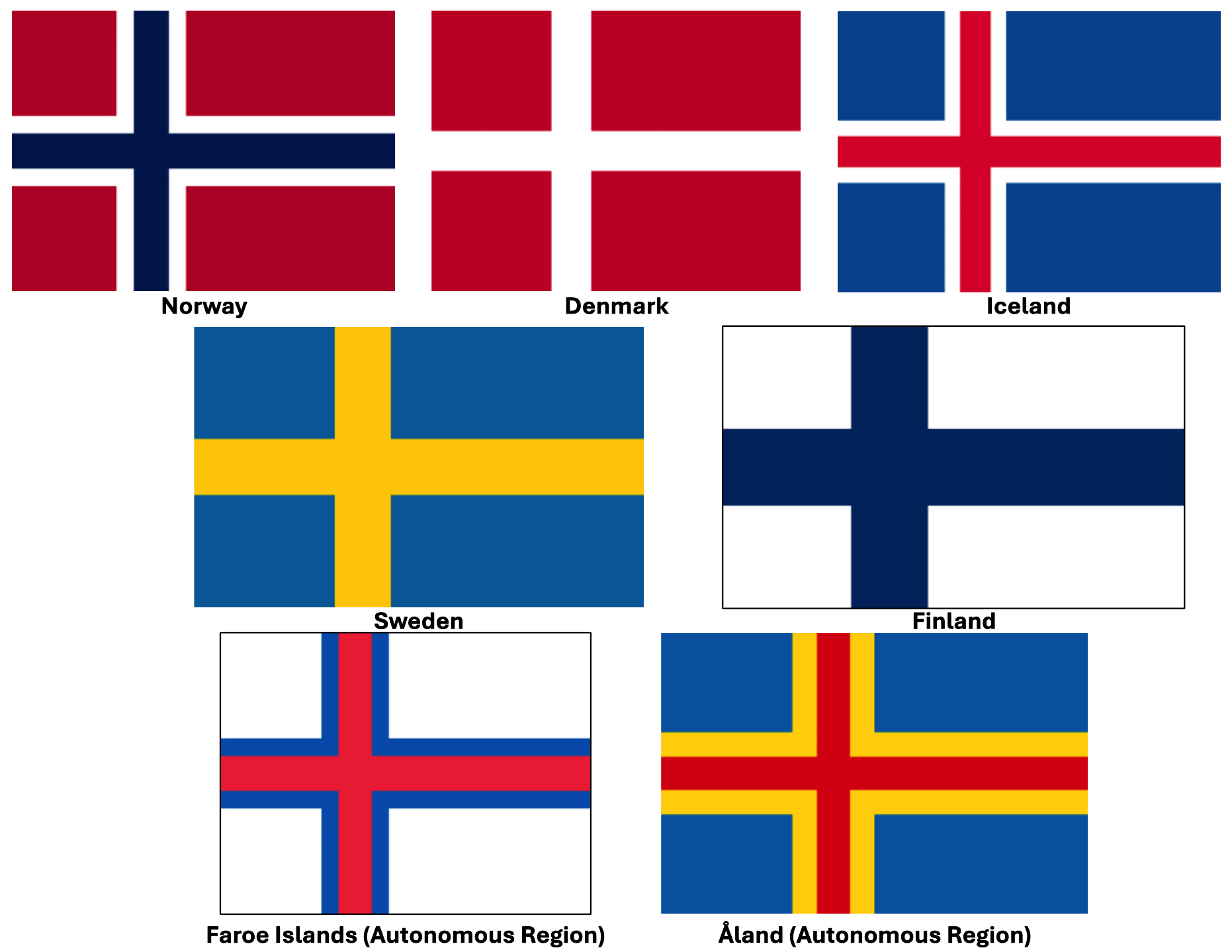
Nordic countries flag family. (Åland and the Faroe Islands are autonomous regions)

== See also ==
Lists of flags

- Lists of flags
- List of national flags of sovereign states
- Gallery of flags of dependent territories
- List of flags by colour combination
- Gallery pages of flags of country subdivisions

Other

- City flag
- Civil flag
- Ethnic flag
- Flag Day
- Flag desecration
- Flag families
- Flags of the World
- Flag protocol
- Glossary of vexillology
- Maritime flag
- National coat of arms
- National emblem
- National seal
- National symbol
- State flag
- Vexillology
- Glossary of vexillology
- Vexillological symbol

== Bibliography ==
- Bellocchi, Ugo (2008). Bandiera madre – I tre colori della vita (in Italian). Scripta Maneant. ISBN 978-88-95847-01-6.
- Busico, Augusta (2005). Il tricolore: il simbolo la storia (in Italian). Presidenza del Consiglio dei Ministri, Dipartimento per l'informazione e l'editoria. SBN IT\ICCU\UBO\2771748.
- Maiorino, Tarquinio; Marchetti Tricamo, Giuseppe; Zagami, Andrea (2002). Il tricolore degli italiani. Storia avventurosa della nostra bandiera (in Italian). Arnoldo Mondadori Editore. ISBN 978-88-04-50946-2.
- Tarozzi, Fiorenza; Vecchio, Giorgio (1999). Gli italiani e il tricolore (in Italian). Il Mulino. ISBN 88-15-07163-6.
- Villa, Claudio (2010). I simboli della Repubblica: la bandiera tricolore, il canto degli italiani, l'emblema (in Italian). Comune di Vanzago. SBN IT\ICCU\LO1\1355389.
