= Flag of Gran Colombia =

One of the official symbols of Gran Colombia

- National flag of Gran Colombia
- Use: National flag and state ensign
- Proportion: 2:3
- Adopted: 1821
- Relinquished: 1830
- Design: A horizontal tricolour of yellow, blue and red with the Emblem of Gran Colombia in the center of the flag with an olive branch surrounding the emblem.
- Designed by: Francisco de Miranda
- Civil flag of Gran Colombia
- Use: Civil flag and ensign
- Proportion: 2:3
- Adopted: 1806 (original design); 1821 (civil use)
- Relinquished: 1830
- Design: A horizontal tricolour of yellow, blue and red.
- Designed by: Francisco de Miranda

The flag of Gran Colombia was the national flag of the Republic of Colombia (1819-1831), the south American state formed through the political union of New Granada and Venezuela, later incorporating the territories of present-day Ecuador.

The Fundamental Law of 12 July 1821 subsequently prescribed the continued use of the flags of New Granada and Venezuela alongside the coat of arms of New Granada, pending the adoption of definitive national emblems.

In October 1821, the Congress of Cúcuta established new national arms. The yellow, blue and red tricolour remained associated with the Republic of Colombia throughout its existence.

Following the separation of Venezuela and Ecuador in 1830 and the reorganization of New Granada in 1831, the three successor states retained the tricolour tradition, subsequently modifying their respective flags. The present-day flags of Colombia, Ecuador and Venezuela therefore share a historical origin in the independence movement and the political experience of the former Republic of Colombia.

== Colours and symbolism ==
According to the current interpretation, the colours signify:

- Yellow: Represents Hispanic America.
- Blue: Represents the Atlantic and Pacific Oceans.
- Red: Represents bloody Spain.

== Flags ==
Provicional flag of Gran Colombia in Venezuela, 1819–1820. Stripe ratios 2:1:1

Provicional Flag of Gran Colombia 1820–1821 in New Granada. Stripe ratios 2:1:1

Approved Flag of Gran Colombia 1821–1830. Stripe ratios 1:1:1

Proposed fourth Flag of Gran Colombia 1822.

=== Provicional flag in Venezuela ===
First flag of Gran Colombia, 1819–1820. Stripe ratios 2:1:1

The first provicional flag was adopted in late 1819. Originally used without arms, the first design of the state flag was based on the Venezuelan flag of 1811. Some variations have the coat of arms in the centre of the flag. This flag was in use officially in Venezuela until 10 January 1820.

=== Provicional flag in New Granada ===
Second Flag of Gran Colombia 1820–1821. Stripe ratios 2:1:1

On 10 January 1820, the Department of Cundinamarca, one of the three official departments of the republic, adopted arms of its own alleging that the arms of the republic were only used in Venezuela. On 12 July 1821, the national congress decreed that the arms of Cundinamarca must be used on the common flag as part of the national coat of arms until new arms could be decreed. Thus, the departmental flag of Cundinamarca was converted into the national flag of Gran Colombia and was officially used in the department of Venezuela. Some variations have the coat of arms in the centre of the flag. It would be the national flag until late 1821.

=== Official Flag Approved by Congress ===
Third Flag of Gran Colombia 1821–1830. Stripe ratios 1:1:1

An official flag was adopted in late 1821, with a different coat of arms. Some variations have the writing "Republica de Colombia" around the coat of arms, and others have the coat of arms encircled. This flag served as the national flag until the country's dissolution in 1830.

=== Proposed fourth flag ===
Proposed fourth Flag of Gran Colombia 1822.

On 11 July 1822, Guayaquil was incorporated and Gran Colombia reached its largest size. New arms were adopted, and the coat of arms was taken off the flag, and replaced with stars. It had three stars, but was upped to six, then nine, then finally twelve. Some variants had no stars, however. The color of the blue stripe was also changed to the dark blue seen on the flags of its successors. Some variants have no star.

== Later countries ==
=== After Dissolution ===
Flags of Gran Colombia's successor states after dissolution

Republic of New Granada

State of Venezuela

State of Ecuador

British Guiana

After the Dissolution of Gran Colombia three of the nations flags remained a yellow-blue-red tricolor, except for British Guiana which took on the Union Jack. The flag of Republic of New Granada is a vertical red-blue-yellow tricolor flag. The flag of State of Venezuela was a horizontal yellow-blue-red tricolor with the coat of arms of Venezuela in the middle of the flag. The flag of Ecuador was a basic yellow-blue-red horizontal tricolor flag with no emblems.

=== Modern Countries ===
Current flags of Gran Colombia's successor states

Colombia

Ecuador

Venezuela

Guyana (Note: Guyana was part of Gran Colombia region which is modern day Venezuela.)

Panama (Note: Panama was formerly part of Gran Colombia and Colombia.)

The Colombian flag is similar to the first Grand Colombian flag, without the coat of arms. The Ecuadorian flag is similar to the Colombian flag, only with the lighter shade of yellow, blue and red, and a centered coat of arms. The Venezuelan flag resembles the Ecuadorian and Colombian flags, but with equal tricolor bands and 8 stars forming an arch.
