= Flag of Ecuador =

Republic of Ecuador
- La Tricolor ('The Tricolor')
- Use: State and war flag, state and naval ensign
- Proportion: 2:3
- Adopted: 26 September 1860 (standardized November 2009)
- Design: A horizontal tricolor of yellow (double width), blue and red with the National Coat of Arms superimposed at the center and El Sol De Mayo (symbolizing independence from Spain).
- Presidential Standard
- Use: Presidential Standard
- Design: Same design as the National Flag with the 1:1 proportion.
- Use: Civil flag and ensign
- Proportion: 2:3
- Design: A horizontal tricolor of yellow (double width), blue and red (like the flag of Colombia).

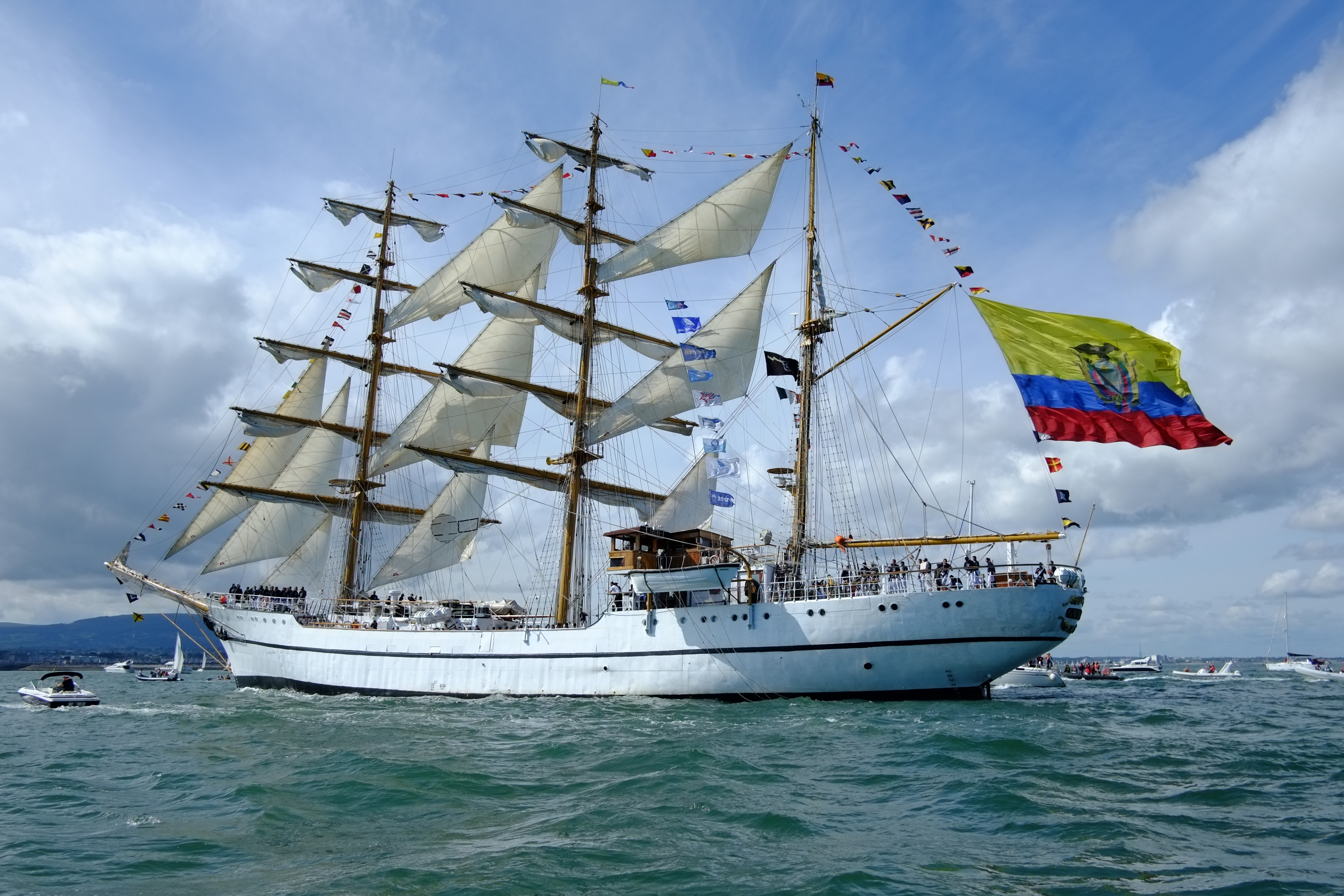
Ecuador flag on the sailing ship BAE Guayas

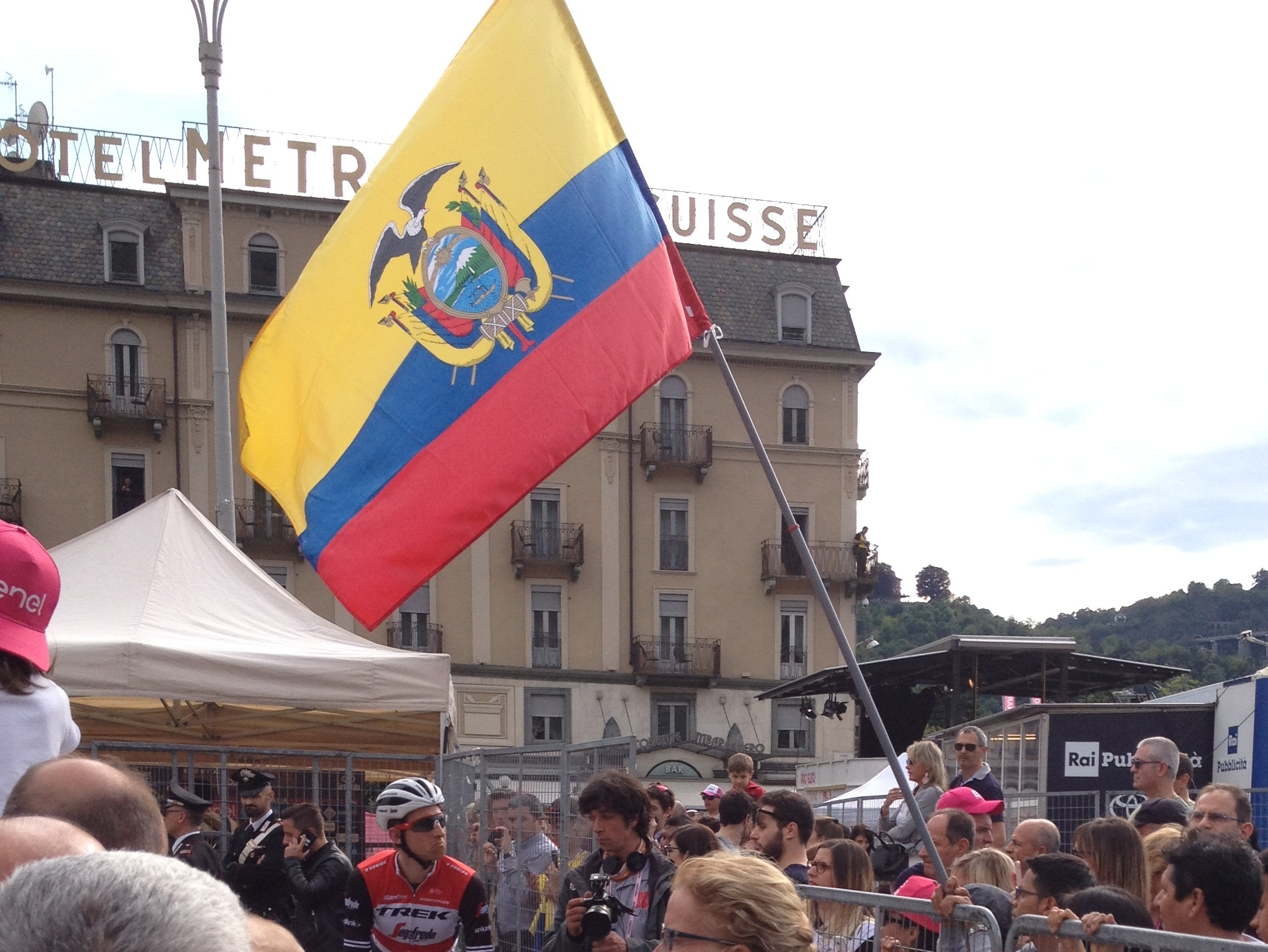
Ecuador flag at the Giro d'Italia

The national flag of Ecuador, which consists of horizontal bands of the Pan-Colombian colors of yellow (double width), blue and red, was first adopted by law in 1835 and later on 26 September 1860. The design of the current flag was finalized in 1900 with the addition of the coat of arms in the center of the flag. Before using the yellow, blue and red tricolor, Ecuador's former flag had three light blue stripes and two white stripes with three white stars for each province of the country. The design of the flag is very similar to those of Colombia and Venezuela, which are also former constituent territories of Gran Colombia. All three are based on a proposal by Venezuelan General Francisco de Miranda, which was adopted by Venezuela in 1811 and later Gran Colombia with some modifications. A variant of the flag that does not contain the coat of arms is used by the merchant marine; this flag matches Colombia's in every aspect, but Colombia uses a different design when the merchant marine ships are at sail.

== Design ==
Construction sheet

The Ecuadorian National Secretariat of Communication (Secretaría Nacional de Comunicación) issued regulations describing the applications and proportions of the national flag, coat of arms, and other national symbols in November 2009.

The national flag has a length of 2.20 meters and a width of 1.47 m, a ratio of 2 to 3. The field is split into three horizontal colored bands, a yellow band of one-half the flag's width, a blue band of one-quarter the width, and a red band of one-quarter the width. All three bands extend the full length of the flag. The flag is charged with the Ecuadorian coat of arms scaled to one-half the width of the flag and centered in the field. The coat of arms itself is constructed in a rectangle with proportions 12:10. The national standard has the same design as the national flag, but is square, with length 0.9 m and width 0.9 m. When used by military units and organizations, lettering can encircle the coat of arms with a diameter of 55 centimeters. The lettering must be 4 cm in height, 3 cm in width, gold-colored Roman font, embroidered with gold thread. The only other regulated size is a table flag (banderola) where the flag is 200 mm wide and 300 mm long. When manufacturing the national flag, sellers to the public must include the name of their company, along with the year of manufacture, by placing a 20 × 10 mm tag on the reverse side of the flag on the sleeve.

=== Coat of arms ===
Coat of arms

In the background of the oval shield is the mountain Chimborazo, while the river originating from its base represents the Guayas. Chimborazo is also the highest mountain in Ecuador and is part of the Andes Range. The steamboat on the river is named Guayas as well. The ship was built in Guayaquil and was the first seaworthy steamship built in both Ecuador and in all of South America. It was first put into service on 9 October 1841. The ship has the features of a Caduceus representing trade and economy. This kind of mast has two wings surrounding a pole with two snakes encircling it. On top a golden sun surrounded by the Zodiac astrological signs for Aries, Taurus, Gemini and Cancer representing the months March to July to symbolize the duration of the March Revolution of 1845 that ousted General Juan José Flores.

The condor on top of the shield stretches his wings to symbolize power, greatness and strength of Ecuador. The condor also represents the idea that it will always be ready to attack any enemy. The shield is flanked by four national flags. The laurel on the left represents the victories of the republic. The palm leaf on the right side is a symbol of the martyrs of the fight for independence and liberty. The Fasces below the shield represents the republican dignity. The final design of the coat of arms was completed in 1900.

In the 1989 specifications issued to the Ecuadorian Military, the coat of arms has only eight colors that are used on the flag. The eight colors are yellow, blue, red (all from the national flag), sky blue, green, grey, silver and gold. There is also a nine-piece instruction on how to draw the coat of arms, followed by a full-color drawing and a black-and-white drawing of the arms. No size specifications have been laid out for the coat of arms except for when it is used on the national flag.

=== Symbolism ===
Miranda ascribed the colours he chose for his flag to Johann Wolfgang von Goethe's theory of primary colours. In a letter written to Count Semyon Romanovich Vorontsov in 1792, Miranda described a late-night conversation which he had with Goethe at a party in Weimar, Germany during the winter of 1785. Fascinated with Miranda's account of his exploits in the American Revolutionary War and his travels throughout the Americas and Europe, Goethe told him that, "Your destiny is to create in your land a place where primary colours are not distorted.” He proceeded to clarify what he meant:

First he explained to me the way the iris transforms the light into the three primary colours... then he said, "Why yellow is the most warm, noble and closest to the bright light; why Blue is that mix of excitement and serenity, so far that it evokes the shadows; and why Red is the exaltation of Yellow and Blue, the synthesis, the vanishing of the bright light into the shadows".

The flag features a unique coat of arms at its center, depicting a mountain, a river, and the famous Galápagos Islands, emphasizing Ecuador's diverse geography. This flag is a symbol of national pride, reflecting Ecuador's independence and unity. The bold colors of yellow, blue, and red, symbolize the country's rich cultural and natural heritage. The first time the yellow, blue and red flag was flown by Miranda was in 1806 on the ship Leander when trying to face the Spanish forces off of the coast of Jacmel, Haiti. The colors of the modern Ecuadorian flag evolved from those of the flag of the nation of Gran Colombia, which encompassed the territories of modern-day Ecuador, Colombia and Venezuela. The colors have the following meanings:

- Yellow: The crops and the fertile soil.
- Blue: The ocean and the clear skies
- Red: The blood spilled by the heroes who died in the name of their countrymen's Fatherland and Freedom.

Color scheme	Yellow	Blue	Red
RGB	255-221-0	3-78-162	237-28-36
HEX	#ffdd00	#034ea2	#ed1c24
CMYK	0-13-100-0	98-52-0-36	0-88-85-7

== History ==
After the territory of Ecuador was conquered by Sebastián de Benalcázar, the emblems of the Spanish Empire flew over the newly founded city of Quito.

The first calls for independence from the Spanish crown came on 10 August 1809; a plain red flag was flown by the rebels. The independence movement was defeated in November 1812 at the hands of Spanish officer Juan Sámano. On 9 October 1820, a new flag, a blue and white bicolour, with five horizontal alternating stripes, and three white stars in the middle stripe, was raised for the first time. The three stars represent Guayaquil, Portoviejo and Machala. This flag was later adopted by the Guayas Province.

Gabriel García Moreno, upon assuming power two days after the Battle of Guayaquil in September 1860, the yellow, blue and red triband was returned to use; its reinstatement on 26 September is commemorated as Día de la Bandera, or National Flag Day in English. Previously, a vertical white, blue and white flag was used. In the middle of the blue stripe, there were white stars placed to signify the number of provinces in Ecuador. The highest star total was seven before this flag was abandoned. In 1900, the flag was made the definitive national standard, and was charged with the coat of arms for official national government use while the plain flag was reserved for the merchant marine.

Evolution of the Ecuadorian flag
Spanish Colonial Flag; 1534–1820		The Cross of Burgundy flag of the Spanish colonial empire flew over Ecuador for many years.
Flag of the Quiteñan Revolution; 1809–1812		The leaders of a rebellion against the Spanish authorities raised a reversed Cross of Burgundy flag in Quito on 10 August 1809. The uprising was defeated in 1812.
First National Flag; 1820–1822		A flag with five horizontal stripes and three stars in the middle stripe. This flag subsequently became that of the Guayas Province, and was first raised by the patriots in the liberation of 9 October 1820.
Second National Flag; 1822		The previous flag was changed by decree of 2 June 1822: "The flag of the free province of Guayaquil shall be white and its first quarter blue with a centered star."
Third National Flag; 1822–1830		Ecuador was subsumed into Colombia, during which time the Colombian horizontal tricolour became definitive. Although Ecuador seceded from that union in 1830, the flag was retained until 1845.
Fourth National Flag; 1830–1835		Provisional flag of the State of Ecuador, decreed on 19 November 1830.
Fifth National Flag; 1835–1845		First flag used officially by Ecuador after its separation from Colombia.
Sixth National Flag; 1845		During the 1845 Marcist Revolution the pale blue and white colours return, but as a vertical tricolour of white, blue, white, with three white stars in the central stripe.
Seventh National Flag; 1845–1860		The Cuenca Convention ratified, by decree of 6 November 1845, a change to a deeper blue, and the increase in the number of stars to seven "as symbols of the seven provinces which make up the Republic".
Eighth National Flag; 1860–1900		Gabriel García Moreno, upon assuming power two days after the Battle of Guayaquil, reinstated the tricolor flag of Greater Colombia on 26 September 1860. In 1900, the flag was made the definitive national standard, and the coat of arms was added for official state use. The plain flag was established as the merchant ensign in 1900.
Ninth National Flag; 1900–2009		The flag from 31 October 1900. In 1900, the flag was made the definitive national standard, and the coat of arms was added for official state use. The plain flag was established as the merchant ensign in 1900, with a modification in November 2009.
Tenth National Flag; 2009–present	borfer	Current national flag

== Pledge and hymn ==
Students and military cadets in Ecuador are required to recite a pledge to the flag, known as the "Juramento a la Bandera" or "Pledge to the Flag." This pledge is usually stated during national holiday or important school functions, such as graduations. There is also a patriotic song called the "Himno a la Bandera" ("Hymn to the Flag") that is after the "Juramento a la Bandera" or before flag retirement ceremonies.

== Variants ==
Flag used by municipal buildings

Variant with the historical coat of arms design by Banderines Gutiérrez, widely used nationwide.

According to Registro Oficial No. 1272, a decree signed into law on 5 December 1900, there are two official designs of the national flag. Article Two established the national banner as the tricolor with the yellow stripe doubling the size of the blue and red stripes. Article Three establishes the national flag charged with the coat of arms and is directed to be used by the military, government offices and diplomatic agents outside of Ecuador. While this law establishes the flag with the coat of arms as the state flag, it did not forbid the civilian population from using the flag. The only restriction is stated in Article Six where the merchant marine is restricted to using the flag without the coat of arms. Because of this, this has been construed to be the civil flag as it was practiced in other South American countries, such as Peru, Bolivia and Argentina. Unlike Ecuador, several of these South American countries forbade the civilian population from using the national flag with the coat of arms or, in the case of Argentina until 1985, the national flag charged with the Sun of May in the middle. Peru and Bolivia still restricts the usage of the state flag to just the government bodies and institutions and reserves the plain flags for national celebrations or as directed by law. However, in practice the flag with the coat of arms is often used in place of the plain flag, especially when it is important to distinguish the latter from the flag of Colombia. In the case when Colombian merchant marine ships are at sea, the Colombian national flag is charged with a red and blue oval with a white star in the center. For city governments, Article 4 in the 1900 decree forbids them from using the national flag with the coat of arms. A special flag was created for the city governments to use; it is a plain national flag charged with white stars that are placed in a circle pattern. The number of white stars will correspond to the number of provinces in Ecuador. However, this flag is identical to Venezuela's flag from 1905 until 1930, and similar to Venezuela's current flag (the stars are now in a semi circle pattern).

== Derivatives ==
Palestina Canton uses the national flag on its flag. Placed in the canton, the Ecuador flag is shown with three even stripes, while the rest of the flag is colored olive green. The use of the Ecuador flag was described by the Palestina government as "unity with the motherland" and olive green represents progress. Loja Province adopted a flag in 1963 that copied the design of the national flag. This was done by the creator of the flag to show his "honor and admiration" to the homeland. Another province, Napo, chose their flag that copied the design of the national flag without the coat of arms. The only modification that was performed was to put a white strip between the blue and yellow.

== Resemblance to other flags ==
The Venezuelan flag of 1811

The current flags of Ecuador, Colombia, and Venezuela can all trace their roots to the flag of the nation of Gran Colombia (1819–1830), the short-lived republic that encompassed the territories of all three. The Gran Colombian flag in turn was inspired by the flag of the First Republic of Venezuela, the first independent government of that nation. The flag of the Venezuelan Republic was modeled on the one created earlier by General Francisco de Miranda during his attempts to gain Venezuelan independence and which first flew over the port of La Vela in Santa Ana de Coro, Venezuela, in 1806.

As of 2006, the Ecuadoran flag still shares some similarity with the flags of Colombia and Venezuela. All three flags use the yellow, blue and red tricolor, but that is where the similarities end. In a decree passed in Colombia in 1934, the ratio of the stripes were set at 2:1:1 and the flag ratio was set at 2:3, similar to the present Ecuador flag. However, the coat of arms is only changed in the middle of the flag when it is used by government officials or by military forces. For Venezuela, the basic design was to have all three strips even vertically, unlike those of Colombia and Ecuador. Since 1863, Venezuela decided to change their flag with white stars instead of a coat of arms. A coat of arms was added to the national flag in 1954, then changed again in 2006 to add another star and alter the coat of arms. The position of the coat of arms on the Venezuelan flag also differs from Ecuador and Colombia by placing the arms at the very top hoist (left) side of the flag instead of in the center.

Flag of Colombia

Flag of Venezuela

== See also ==
- List of Ecuadorian flags
- Flag of Colombia
