= Flag of Colombia =

Republic of Colombia
- El Tricolor Nacional ('The National Tricolor')
- Use: National flag and ensign
- Proportion: 2:3
- Adopted: 26 November 1861; 164 years ago
- Design: A horizontal tricolor in a 2:1:1 proportion, where the upper yellow band is twice the size of the others; it is followed by blue and red.
- Use: Civil ensign
- Proportion: 2:3
- Design: A Colombian tricolor defaced with a blue ellipse outlined in red at its center, containing a white eight-pointed star.
- Use: State flag and ensign
- Proportion: 2:3
- Design: A Colombian tricolor defaced with the coat of arms of Colombia.
- Use: Naval ensign
- Proportion: 2:3
- Design: A Colombian tricolor defaced with a white circle outlined in red at its center, enclosing the coat of arms of Colombia.
- Use: War flag
- Proportion: 4:5
- Design: A Colombian tricolor defaced of reduced proportions, with a white circle outlined in red at its center, enclosing the coat of arms of Colombia.
- Use: Naval jack
- Proportion: 2:3
- Design: A sky blue field with a white circle outlined in red at its center, enclosing the coat of arms of Colombia.

The flag of the Republic of Colombia, also known as El Tricolor Nacional (The National Tricolor), is the national flag representing the country and, alongside the coat of arms and the national anthem, constitutes one of its official national symbols. The flag consists of a rectangle divided into three horizontal bands featuring the primary colors of the RYB color model. The upper band occupies half of the total height, following a proportional ratio of 2:1:1.

Its design is inspired by the flag created in 1801 by Venezuelan patriots Francisco de Miranda and Lino de Clemente for the First Republic of Venezuela, which was later approved by the Constituent Congress of that country in 1811.

These colors were successively adopted by the Congresses of Gran Colombia on December 17, 1819, and the Republic of New Granada on May 9, 1834. The current arrangement of the colors was officially adopted on November 26, 1861, and subsequently regulated by Decrees No. 861 of May 17, 1924, and No. 62 of January 11, 1934.

Due to their shared historical origin, the Colombian flag bears resemblance to the national flags of Ecuador and Venezuela, which were once part of the former state of Gran Colombia. Among these, the Ecuadorian flag is the most similar, with its legislation recognizing two official versions that closely mirror the proportions and layout of Colombia's flag, differing only in the specific shades used. (Note: The civil ensign of Ecuador may cause confusion with the flag of Colombia due to their marked similarity. In contrast, the state flag of Ecuador incorporates the national coat of arms at its center, thereby distinguishing it more clearly. In both cases, the shades of the colors used in these Ecuadorian flags differ from those employed in the Colombian flag.) In the case of Colombia, the use of the national coat of arms on the flag is mandatory exclusively in official institutional contexts.

As a national symbol, the flag is employed by the Government and state institutions, with specific variations in its design depending on its intended use by diplomatic, civil, or military bodies.

== Design ==
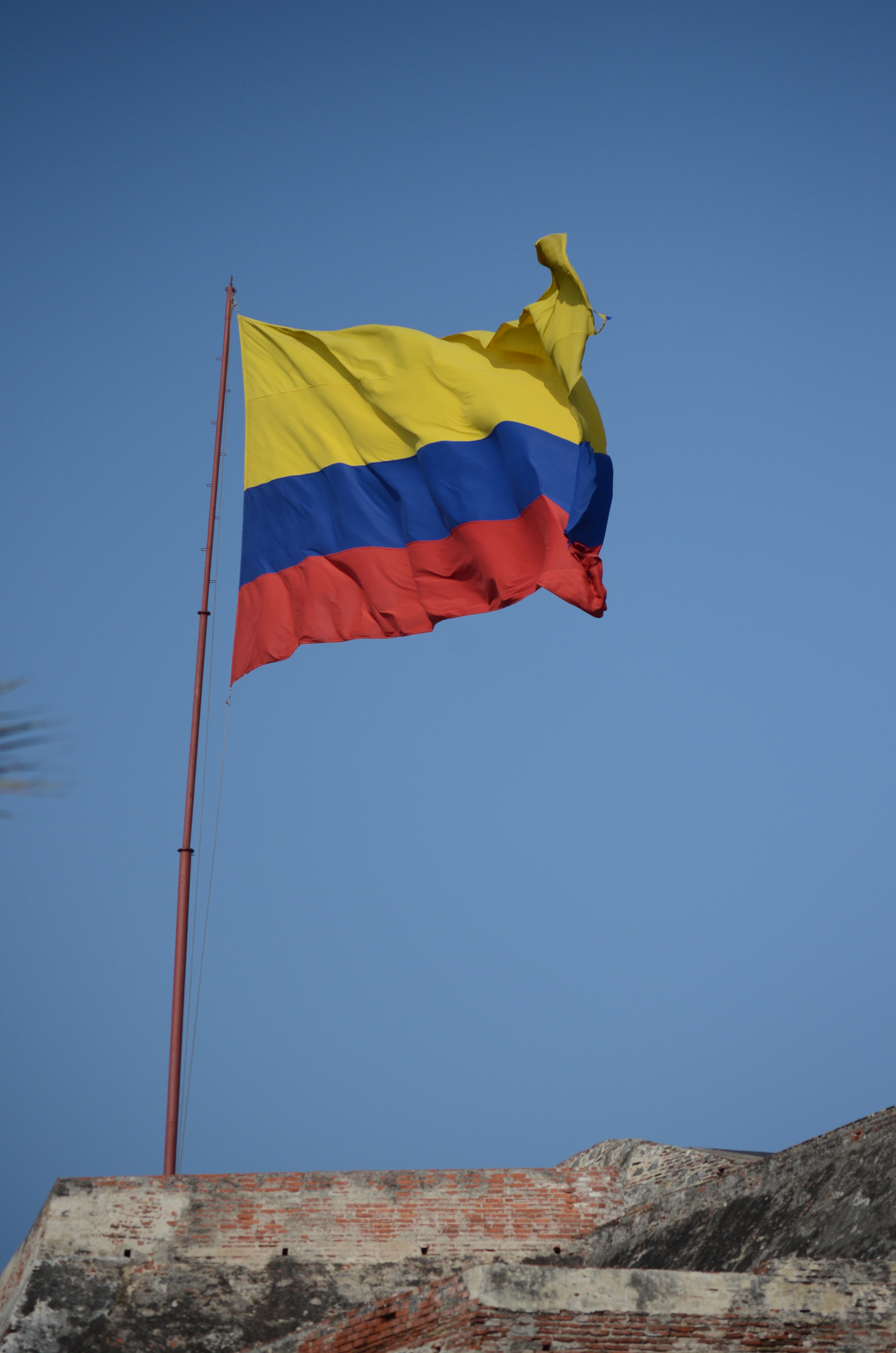
Flag of Colombia atop Castillo San Felipe de Barajas in Cartagena, Colombia.

Construction sheet of Colombia national flag.

The horizontal stripes (from top to bottom) of yellow, blue and red tricolor have a ratio of 2:1:1. The Colombian flag, the flag of Ecuador, and the flag of Venezuela are all derived from the flag of Gran Colombia. The stripes of the Colombian and Ecuadorian flags are different from most other tricolor flags because the three stripes are not equal sizes. In contrast, the flag of Venezuela is a more conventional tricolor due to its evenly sized stripes.

The exact colors of the flag have not yet been officially established by law. However, the following colors, approved by the FIAV, are recommended. These colors, for instance, were used in the "Flags and Anthems Manual" for the 2012 Summer Olympics:

Color scheme	Yellow	Blue	Red
Pantone	116	287	186
RGB (hex)	255-205-0 (#FFCD00)	0-48-135 (#003087)	200-16-46 (#C8102E)
CMYK	0-20-100-0	100-64-0-47	0-92-77-22

=== Symbolism ===
According to the government of Colombia, the colors of the flag represent:

- Yellow: the riches of the country, the wealth of the Colombian soil, the gold, sovereignty, harmony, justice and agriculture, as well as the Sun, the source of light.
- Blue: the sky above, the seas on Colombia's shores, and the rivers that run through.
- Red: the blood spilled for Colombia's independence and also the effort of Colombian people, their determination and perseverance. Although Colombia's people once struggled, they have since thrived.

The flag's colors have other representations, such as blue for loyalty and vigilance, red for the victory of battles for Colombian independence, and yellow for sovereignty and justice.

== History ==
Francisco de Miranda originally created the common yellow, blue, and red flag of Gran Colombia that Colombia, Ecuador and Venezuela, with slight variations, share today. Miranda gave at least two sources of inspiration for his flag. In a letter written to the Russian count Semyon Vorontsov and the German philosopher Johann Wolfgang von Goethe, Miranda described a late-night conversation he had had with Goethe at a party in Weimar during the winter of 1785. Fascinated by Miranda's account of his exploits in the United States Revolutionary War and his travels throughout the Americas and Europe, Goethe told him, "Your destiny is to create in your land a place where primary colors are not distorted." He proceeded to clarify what he meant:

First he explained to me the way the iris transforms light into the three primary colours […] then he proved to me why yellow is the most warm, noble and closest to [white] light; why blue is that mix of excitement and serenity, a distance that evokes shadows; and why red is the exaltation of yellow and blue, the synthesis, the vanishing of light into shadow.

It is not that the world is made of yellows, blues and reds; it is that in this manner, as if in an infinite combination of these three colours, we human beings see it. […] A country [Goethe concluded] starts out from a name and a flag, and it then becomes them, just as a man fulfils his destiny.

After Miranda designed his flag based on this conversation, he recalled seeing a fresco by Lazzaro Tavarone in the Palazzo Belimbau in Genoa that depicted Christopher Columbus unfurling a similar-colored flag in Veragua during his fourth voyage.

In his military diary, Miranda gave another possible source of inspiration: the yellow, blue and red standard of the Burger Guard (Bürgerwache) of Hamburg, which he also saw during his travels in Germany.

In the 1801 plan for an army to liberate Spanish America, which he submitted unsuccessfully to the British cabinet, Miranda requested the materials for "ten flags, whose colors shall be red, yellow, and blue, in three zones." However, the first flag was not raised until 12 March 1806, in Jacmel, Haiti, during his ill-fated expedition to Venezuela.

The flag was officially adopted by law on 26 November 1861.

== Official flags ==
National flag

National flag and ensign of Colombia

State flag and ensign of Colombia

Military and civil flags

Civil ensign of Colombia

Naval ensign of Colombia

War flag of Colombia

Presidential flag of Colombia since 1991

Presidential flag of Colombia before 1991

Construction sheets

Construction sheet of the national flag

Construction sheet of the civil ensign

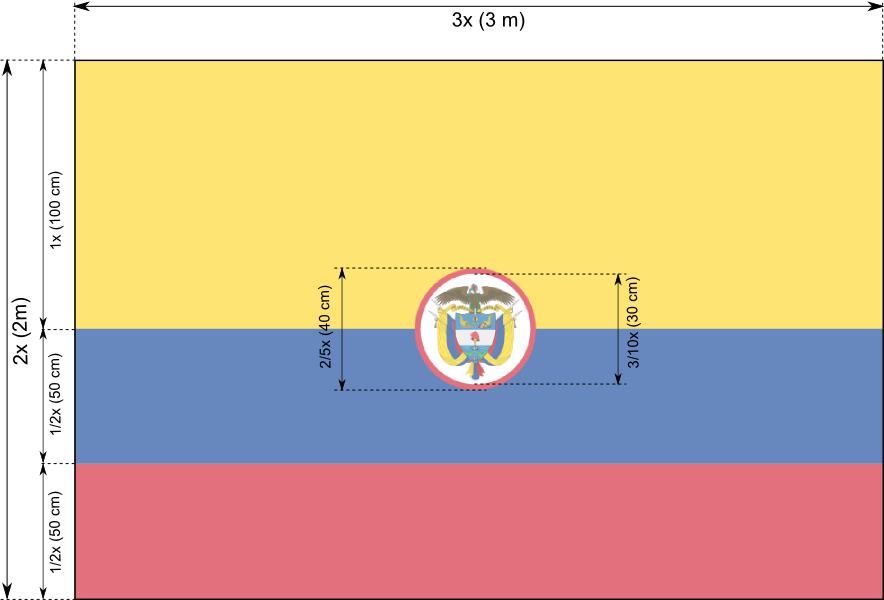
Construction sheet of the naval ensign

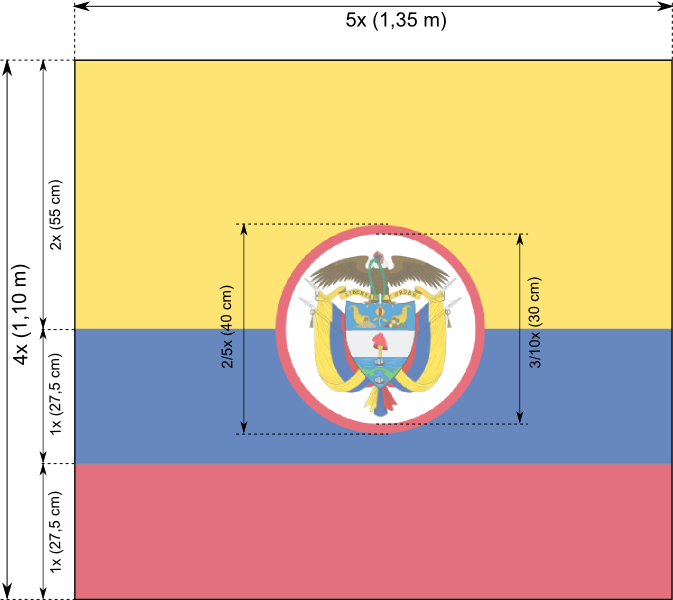
Construction sheet of the war flag

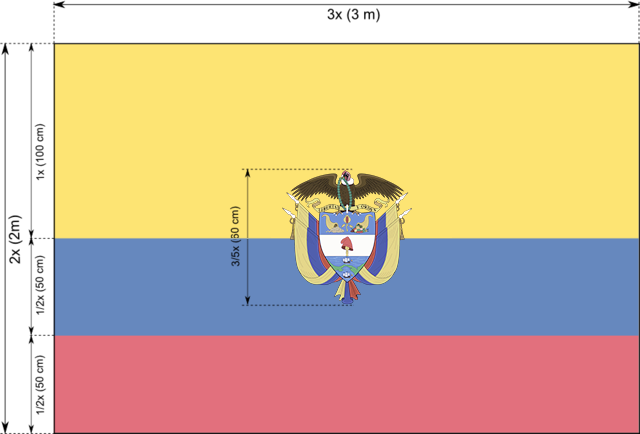
Construction sheet of the presidential flag

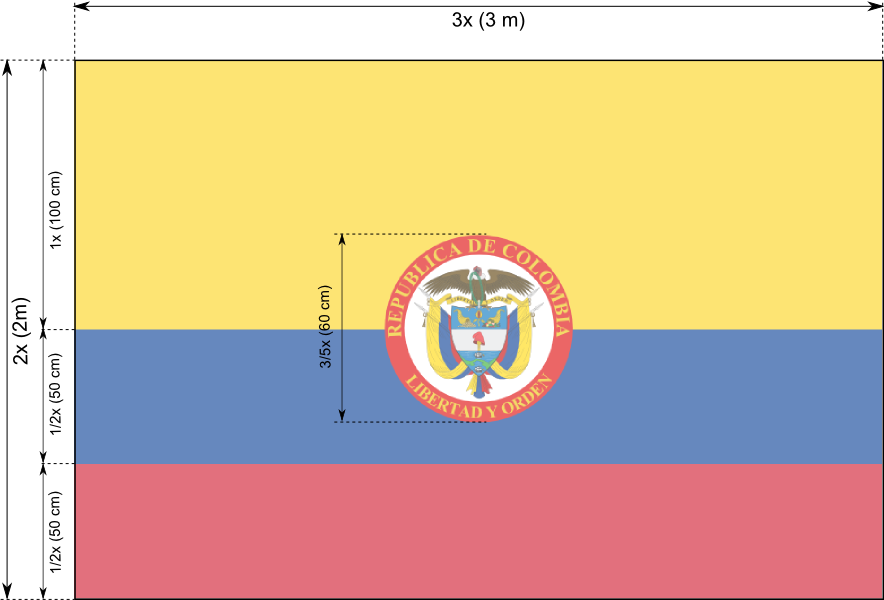
Construction sheet of the presidential flag of Colombia used before 1991

== Historical flags ==
Historical national flags

Flag of United Provinces of New Granada (1811–1814), later adopted and used by Jean Lafitte from 1817 to 1821 at Galveston Island, Spanish Texas, New Spain

Flag of United Provinces of New Granada (1814–1816)

Flag of Gran Colombia (1819–1820)

Flag of Gran Colombia (1820–1821)

Flag of Gran Colombia (1821–1831)

Flag of New Granada (1831–1834)

Flag of Republic of New Granada (1834–1858) and Granadine Confederation (1858–1861)

Flag of United States of New Granada (1861)

Flag of United States of Colombia (1861–1886) and Republic of Colombia (1886–present)

Historical military and civil flags

Civil ensign of Granadine Confederation (1858–1861)

Military flag and naval ensign of Republic of New Granada (1834–1858)

Civil ensign of United States of Colombia (1861–1886)

Military flag and naval ensign of United States of Colombia (1861–1886)

== Gallery of images ==
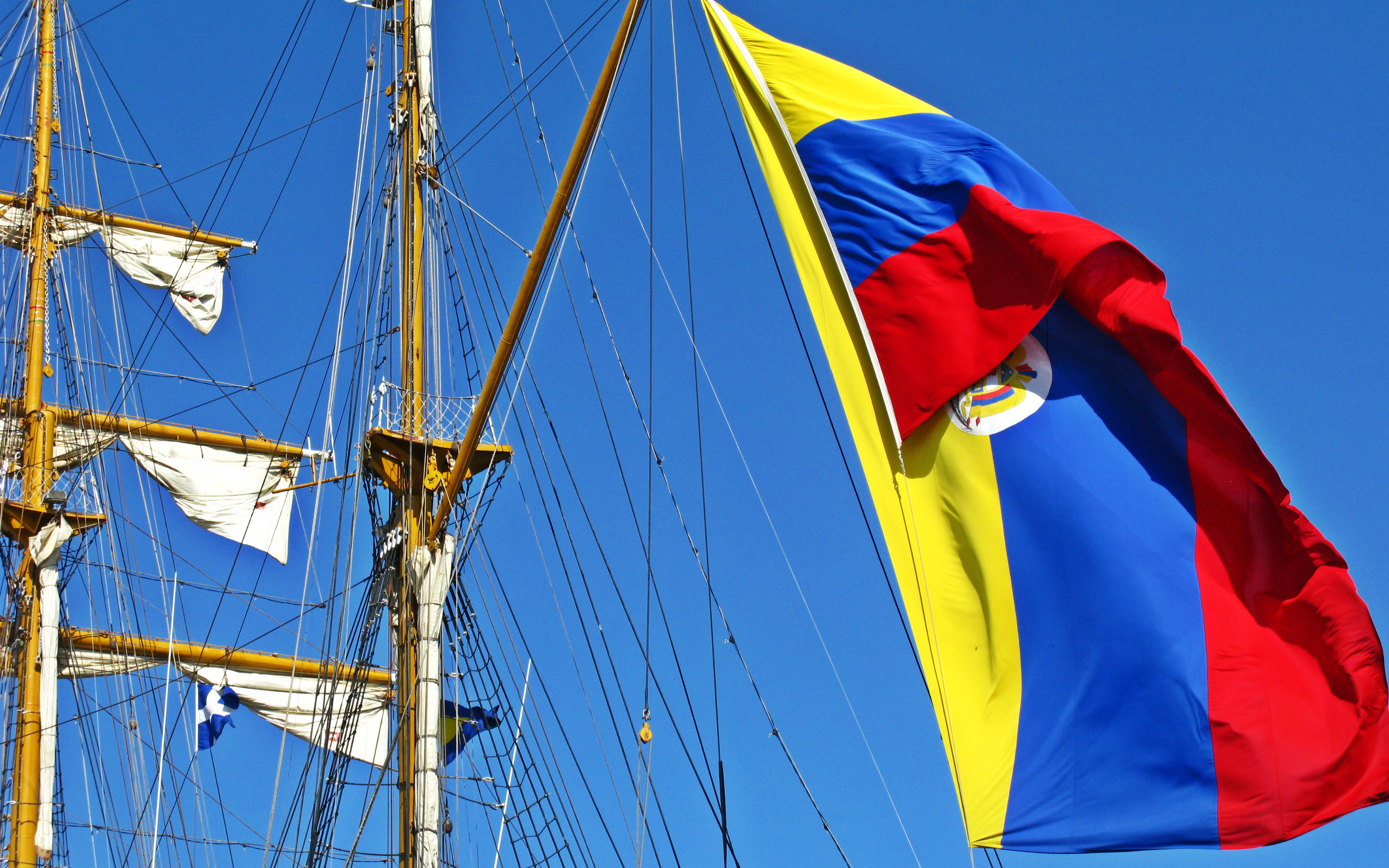
Colombian flag hoisted on the ARC Gloria barque, the official flagship of the Colombian Navy.

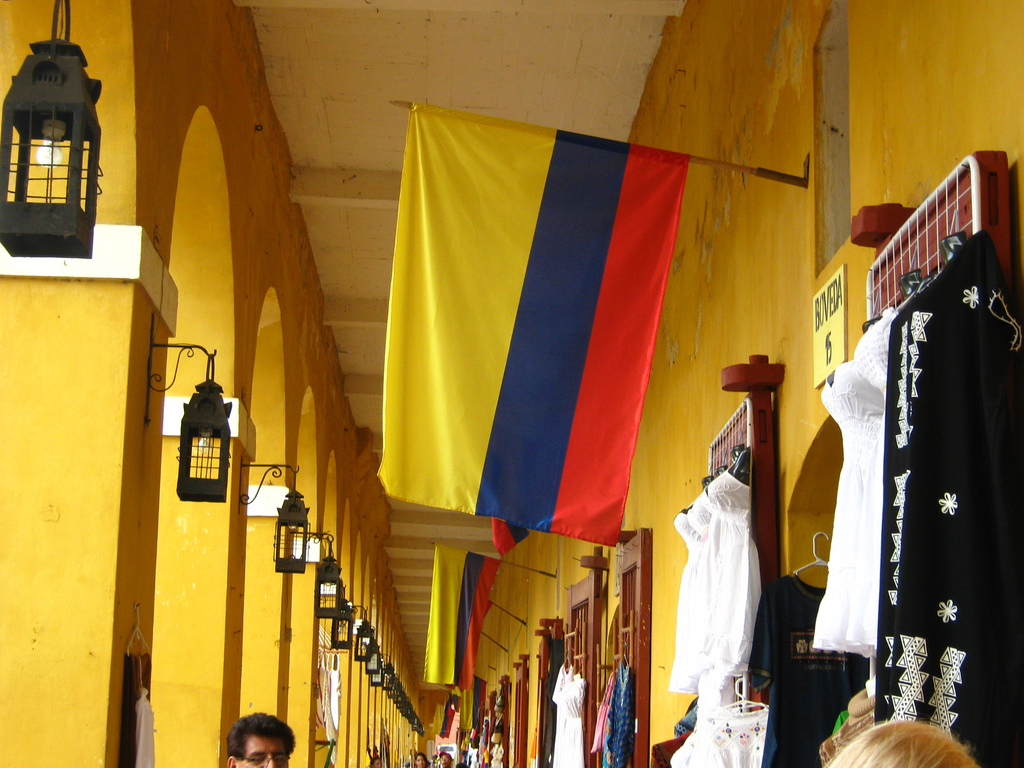
Colombian tricolor in a colonial building corridor in Cartagena de Indias.

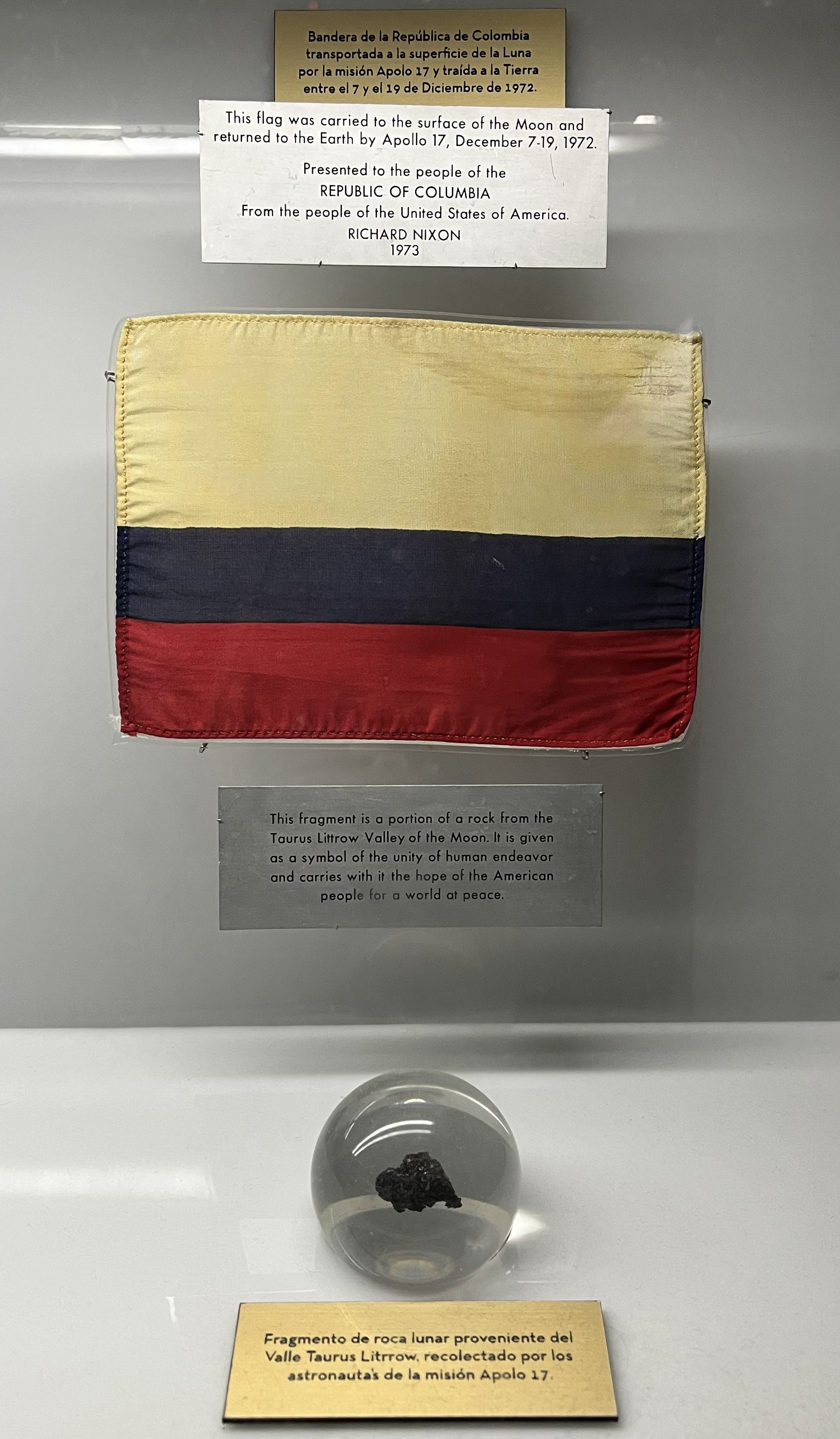
Flag of Colombia which was carried to the surface of the Moon during the Apollo 17 mission.

== See also ==
- List of Colombian flags
- Coat of arms of Colombia
- ¡Oh, Gloria inmarcesible!, national anthem of Colombia
- Flag of Ecuador (similar design; with the coat of arms in the center)
- Flag of Russia (similar design; white stripe instead of yellow, 1:1:1 ratio)
- Flag of Lithuania (similar design; green stripe instead of blue, 1:1:1 ratio)
