= Flag of Venezuela =

Bolivarian Republic of Venezuela
- Use: National flag and civil ensign
- Proportion: 2:3
- Adopted: 12 March 2006; 20 years ago
- Design: A horizontal tricolour of yellow, blue and red with an arc of eight white five-pointed stars centred on the blue band.
- Designed by: Francisco de Miranda
- Use: State and war flag, state and naval ensign
- Proportion: 2:3
- Adopted: 9 March 2006; 20 years ago
- Design: A horizontal tricolour of yellow, blue and red with the National Coat of Arms on the upper hoist-side of the yellow band and an arc of eight white five-pointed stars centred on the blue band.
- Designed by: Francisco de Miranda
- Use: Naval jack
- Design: A navy blue field charged with an anchor with seven five-pointed stars in an arc above it.

The current national flag of Venezuela (Spanish: Bandera de Venezuela) was introduced in 2006. The basic design includes a horizontal tricolour of yellow, blue, and red, dating to the original flag introduced in 1811, in the Venezuelan War of Independence.

Further modifications have involved including a set of stars, multiple changes to the placement and number of stars and inclusion of an optional coat of arms at the upper-left corner.

== Original flag ==
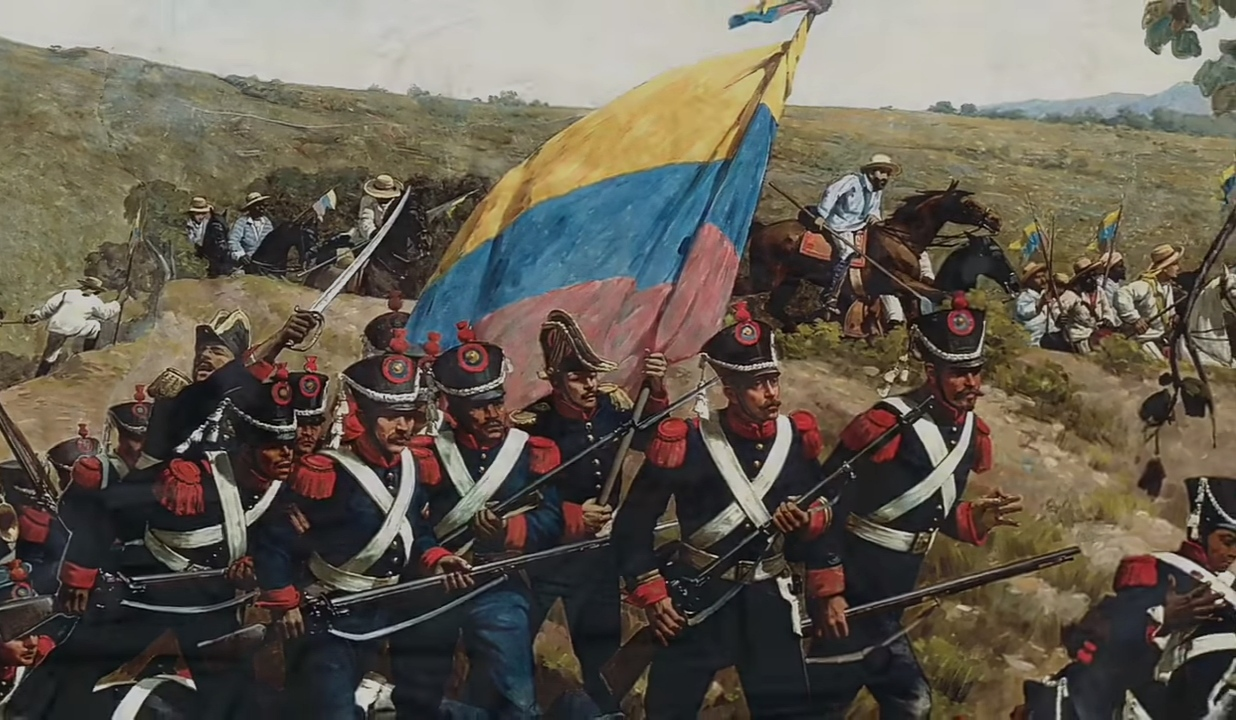
Detail of The Battle of Carabobo (1887) by Martín Tovar y Tovar

The flag is essentially the one designed by Francisco de Miranda for his unsuccessful 1806 expedition to liberate Venezuela and later adopted by the National Congress of 1811. It consisted of three equal horizontal stripes of yellow, blue and red. Miranda's flag is also the inspiration for the flags of Colombia and Ecuador. The flag of the short-lived Republic of Spanish Haiti was also based on Miranda's tricolore and resembles the current Venezuelan flag. This original design was first flown on 12 March 1806, at Jacmel, Haiti, as Miranda's expedition prepared to make the final leg of its voyage to Venezuela. The flag was first flown over Venezuelan soil at La Vela de Coro, on 3 August. Until 3 August 2006, Flag Day was celebrated in Venezuela on 12 March. Since 2006, it has been celebrated on 3 August.

Miranda gave at least two sources of inspiration for his flag. In a letter written to Count Semyon Vorontsov in 1792, Miranda stated that the colours were based on theory of primary colours given to him by the German writer and philosopher Johann Wolfgang von Goethe. Miranda described a late-night conversation he had with Goethe at a party in Weimar during the winter of 1785. Fascinated with Miranda's account of his exploits in the United States Revolutionary War and his travels throughout the Americas and Europe, Goethe told him that, "Your destiny is to create in your land a place where primary colours are not distorted.” He proceeded to clarify what he meant by this:

First he explained to me the way the iris transforms light into the three primary colours […] then he proved to me why yellow is the warmest, noble and closest to [white] light; why blue is that mix of excitement and serenity, a distance that evokes shadows; and why red is the exaltation of yellow and blue, the synthesis, the vanishing of light into shadow.
It is not that the world is made of yellows, blues, and reds; it is that in this manner, as if in an infinite combination of these three colours, we human beings see it. […] A country starts out from a name and a flag, and it then becomes them, just as a man fulfills his destiny.

After Miranda later designed his flag based on this conversation, he happily recalled seeing a fresco by Lazzaro Tavarone in the Palazzo Belimbau in Genoa that depicted Christopher Columbus unfurling a similar-coloured flag in Veragua during his fourth voyage.

In his military diary, Miranda gave another source of inspiration: the yellow, blue and red standard of the Burgers' Guard (Bürgerwache) of Hamburg, which he also saw during his travels in Germany. The idea of the flag is documented in his 1801 plan for an army to liberate Spanish America, which he submitted unsuccessfully to the British cabinet. In it Miranda requested the materials for "ten flags, whose colours shall be red, yellow and blue, in three zones".

The symbolism traditionally ascribed to the colours is that the yellow band stands for the wealth of the land, the red for courage, and the blue for the independence from Spain, or "golden" America separated from bloody Spain by the deep blue sea.

== Colours and symbolism ==
According to the current interpretation, the colours signify:

- Yellow: Represents the riches of the country, the wealth of Venezuelan soil, gold, sovereignty, harmony, justice and agriculture, as well as the Sun, the source of light.
- Blue: Represents the Sea of the Caribbean that surrounds the country, as well as Venezuela's beaches.
- Red: Represents the blood spilt in the battle of independence from Spain.
- 8 White stars: Represent the seven colonial province signatories to the 1811 Declaration of Independence—Caracas, Cumaná, Barinas, Margarita, Barcelona, Mérida and Trujillo—and the eighth star represents Guayana who joined in 1817.

== 19th-century changes ==
During the first half of the 19th century, seven stars were added to the flag to represent the seven signatories to the Venezuelan declaration of independence, being the provinces of Caracas, Cumaná, Barcelona, Barinas, Margarita, Mérida, and Trujillo.

Historical flags

First Republic of Venezuela (1810-1812)

Second Republic of Venezuela
(1813–1814)

Third Republic of Venezuela
(1817–1819)

(1830–1836)

(1836–1859)

(1859)

(1859–1863)

United States of Venezuela
(1863–1905)

State flag (1863–1905)

United States of Venezuela
(1905–1930)

State flag (1905–1930)

Civil flag (1930–2006)

State flag (1930–1954)

State flag (1954–2006)

Civil flag (2006–present)

State flag (2006–present)

After the Guayana campaign, Simón Bolívar added the eighth star to the national flag (the so-called Flag of Angostura) in the representation of the newly freed province. Bolívar issued the following decree:

Simón Bolívar. Supreme Leader of the Republic and Captain-in-chief of the Armies of Venezuela and New Granada. Since the number of provinces that compose the Republic of Venezuela has increased with the incorporation of Guyana decreed on October 15, I hereby decree the following: Sole article.- One star shall be added to the seven stars present on the Venezuelan national flag as a symbol of the province of Guayana in such a way that the flag will feature eight stars from now on. Given and signed by my hand, sealed with the provisional seal of the State and countersigned by the Secretary of Office in the Government Palace of the city of Angostura on November 20, 1817. Simón Bolívar.

== 1954 changes ==
7-star Flag of Venezuela, in use 1930–1954.

The Law of the National Flag, Coat of Arms and Anthem added the Coat of arms to the flag on February 17, 1954. The coat of arms was not incorporated into the Civil or Maritime Flag, which is intended for non-governmental purposes, such as civilian use, merchant craft, and international sports competition.

== 2006 changes ==
7-star Flag of Venezuela with a coat of arms, in use 1954–2006. Since 2006 it has been used by some of the opposition parties.

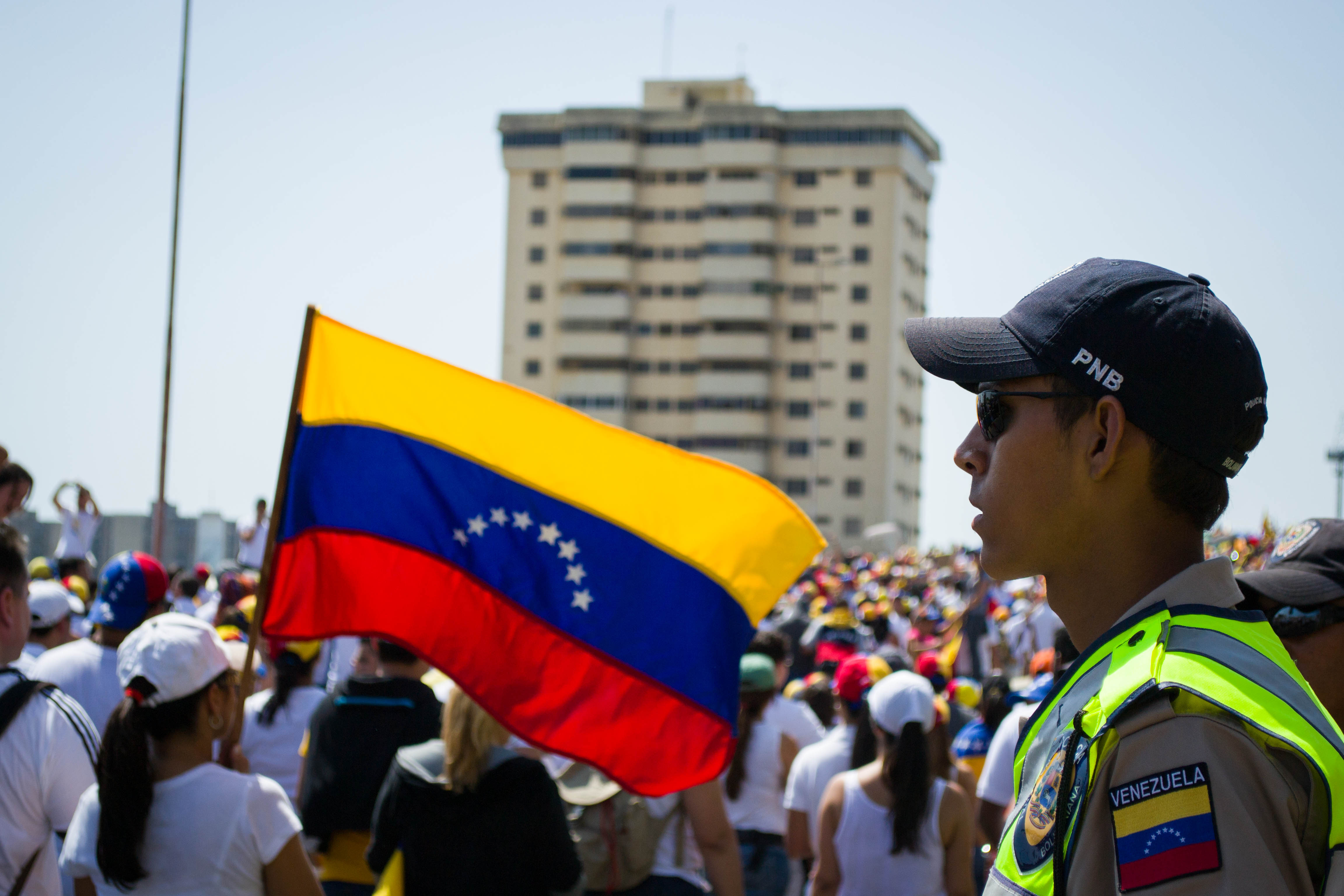
8-star flag in use at protest in 2014

In November 2005, the President of Venezuela Hugo Chávez announced plans to add an eighth star to the flag of Venezuela in accordance to Bolívar's 1817 decree. The eighth star represents the Guayana Province, one of the Provinces of Venezuela at the time of the declaration of independence. The Coat of Arms was also changed to a white horse galloping left instead of cantering to the right, a bow and arrow, and a machete. Although the new flag was approved by the Venezuelan government, opposition spokesperson Óscar Pérez stated that they would not use the new flag.

The new flag change is controversial for another reason, being that the eighth star represents the Guayana Province, which now belongs to the modern-day States of Amazonas, Bolivar, Delta Amacuro and two-thirds of Guyana, a country that Venezuela has ongoing tensions with over a border dispute of the entire region west of the Essequibo River, which was ruled in Guyana's favour by an international tribunal.

== Customs and regulations ==
As with most other national flags, the Venezuelan flag should be flown every day by the legally registered public institutions from 7 a.m. until 6 p.m. Private institutions, businesses, and citizens should fly the flag on national holidays or on days determined by the National Executive. Institutions which should fly the flag by obligation are:

- The Federal Legislative Palace, when the National Assembly is in session and buildings in which a legislative council is being held,
- Public national, state and municipal offices on national holidays and other days determined by special resolution of the relevant authorities,
- Embassies, legations, consulates, and other national agencies abroad, on national holidays or when required by the protocol of the host nation,
- Miraflores Palace, the residence and office building of the President of the Bolivarian Republic of Venezuela, daily,
- Buildings of the Armed Forces, fortresses and other military buildings, as determined by the law and pertinent regulations,
- Venezuelan merchant ships, using the civil ensign, since they operate in a civil capacity.

There is currently no regulation as to the dimensions of the flag, its use inside private or public institutions or by the public in general, its form and protocol. The conventions that currently exist have been freely determined. Nevertheless, educational institutions currently follow a protocol modeled on the regulations issued for the armed forces for use in raising the flag on special days.

Out of respect for the flag, popular culture holds that upon raising the flag, the national anthem should be played and all civilians present should stand still, straight, with closed hands at the sides and without any headgear, while military and police personnel out of formation must salute.

=== Folding the flag ===
Although there is no official regulation on the manner in which the flag should be folded, there is, as in other countries, a procedure with widespread acceptance in schools, scout groups, and military institutions. Its origins are not known, but there are several possibilities, such as the adoption of the custom from other South American nations, in which this singular way of folding a flag originated. In the Venezuelan case, there are two ways of folding the flag depending on whether it is a civil or state flag.

- For the state flag, the flag is lowered and taken to the place where it will be folded. It is then held at all four corners by at least two people. The red stripe is folded over the blue and then the yellow over the red so that the yellow stripe and the national arms are on top and the blue stripe with stars on the bottom. The flag is then folded under in a triangular manner from the fly to the hoist such that at the end the remaining material is tucked into the last fold and the resulting triangle is all yellow with the national arms.
- For the civil flag, the flag is also lowered in the same manner as above but the yellow stripe is folded first over the blue one, then the red one over the yellow stripe, with the blue stripe and stars facing down. The flag is then folded over in a triangular manner so that the resulting triangle is only blue with stars.

== Flag anthem ==
The flag has its own anthem, which was composed in 1889 with music by Francisco Araldi and lyrics by Zolessi Geronimo, which reads:

Himno de la Bandera
Spanish
English
Verse I

Oh, Bandera del pueblo Caribe
vivo foco de luz y de honor
en tus pliegues mi patria se exhibe
grande en gloria y rica en valor.

Oh, flag of the Caribbean people
Living focus of light and honour
in your folds my homeland is exhibited
great in glory and rich in valour.

Verse II

Difundiste por cumbres y llanos
la epopeya de la libertad
y dejaste sobre ambos océanos
los relumbres de la heroicidad.

You spread throughout peaks and plains
the age of freedom
and left on both oceans
shining flashes of heroism.

Verse III

Venezuela la hermosa y pujante
en sus brazos la gloria te alzó
y en tu seno de amor palpitante
ocho estrellas de vida encendió.

Venezuela, the beautiful and thriving
in its arms glory has raised you
and in your breast of palpable love
eight stars of life have been lit

== Student oath to the flag ==
Similarly, a Flag Oath has also been written for students to be said on 3 August, which is as follows:

Spanish	English
¡Bandera Mía! ¡Mi Patria eres tú! Y la Patria es la tierra: ¡Venezuela! Es el Llano, son los Andes, es el Mar que nos rodea. Es la Selva y sus riquezas. Son sus ríos. Son sus hombres, sus mujeres y sus niños. Es su música. Es la Lengua Castellana en que te hablamos. Es la Historia que es Bolívar. ¡Son mis padres, mis hermanos, mis amigos, mis maestros!. Aquí vengo reverente, El cariño, el respeto y la adhesión que te debemos ¡Porque eres, mi Bandera, todo eso! Y eres más. Te prometo, cada día, ser mejor: Estudiar con dedicación. Ser honesto y capaz. Contribuir a tu grandeza Y elevar, hasta el cielo, Esas franjas amarilla, azul y roja ¡Y entregarle ocho estrellas que le faltan!	My Flag! My Fatherland you are! And the Fatherland is the land: Venezuela! It's the Plains, the Andes, and the sea that surrounds us. It's the rainforest and its virtues. It's its rivers. It's their men, women and children. It's its music. It is the Spanish language with which we speak to you. It is the history that is Bolivar. They are my parents, my brothers, my friends, my teachers!. Here I come in reverence, The love, respect and commitment we owe you Because you're my banner, all that! And you are more. I promise you, every day, to be better: Studying with dedication. Being honest and capable. To contribute to your greatness And raise up to the sky, Those stripes of yellow, blue and red And give it the eight stars it's missing!

This is followed by the following pledge for those in schools:

Spanish	English
Juramento a la Bandera Nacional Maestro: ¡Joven venezolano que de la Bandera has hecho una imagen de la Patria! ¡Has hecho una promesa! ¿Juras cumplirla? Estudiantes: ¡Juramos!	Pledge to the National Flag Teacher: Young Venezuelans, this Flag holds before you an image of the Fatherland! And it has a promise! Do you swear to fulfill it? Students: Yes, we pledge!

Versions of this oath and pledge are used for the National Armed Forces of the Bolivarian Republic of Venezuela and the Policia Nacional Bolivariana, but in this case, only the pledge is used during graduation and passing out parades.

== See also ==
- List of flags of Venezuela
- Flag of Gran Colombia
