= Flags of South America =

A map of South America with national flags, excluding dependent territories

This is a gallery of flags of South American countries and affiliated international organizations.

== International ==
Flag	Date	Use	Description
	1996–present	Flag of the Andean Community	
	1994–present	Flag of Mercosur	
	2011–present	Flag of the Union of South American Nations	

== Flags of South American sovereign states ==
Flag	Date	Use	Description
	1861–present	Flag of Argentina; See also: List of Argentine flags	A horizontal bicolor triband of blue, white and blue with the Sun of May in the center.
	1851–present	Flag of Bolivia; See also: List of Bolivian flags	
	1992–present	Flag of Brazil; See also: List of Brazilian flags	
	1817–present	Flag of Chile; See also: List of Chilean flags	A blue square in the top hoist corner that symbolizes the sky and Pacific Ocean, with a white star in that blue square representing the planet Venus, and two stripes with the white one symbolizing the snow covered Andes and the red one symbolizing the blood spilled to achieve independence.
	1861–present	Flag of Colombia; See also: List of Colombian flags	A wide yellow band at the top recalls the federation of Greater Colombia. A blue band in the center represents independence. The red band at the bottom symbolizes courage.
	1860–present	Flag of Ecuador; See also: List of Ecuadorian flags	
	1966–present	Flag of Guyana; See also: List of Guyanese flags	
	2013–present	Flag of Paraguay; See also: List of Paraguayan flags	
	1825–present	Flag of Peru; See also: List of Peruvian flags	
	1975–present	Flag of Suriname; See also: List of Surinamese flags	
	1830–present	Flag of Uruguay; See also: List of Uruguayan flags	
	2006–present	Flag of Venezuela; See also: List of Venezuelan flags	

== Flags of South American dependencies and other territories ==
Flag	Date	Use	State (status)	Description
	1976–present	Flag of Aruba	Netherlands (constituent country)	
	1981–present	Flag of Bonaire	Netherlands (special municipality)	
	1984–present	Flag of Curaçao	Netherlands (constituent country)	
	1999–present	Flag of the Falkland Islands	United Kingdom (overseas territory)	
	2015–present	Flag of French Guiana	France (overseas region and department)	
	1999–present	Flag of South Georgia and the South Sandwich Islands	United Kingdom (overseas territory)	

== Flags of South American cities ==
Flags of cities with over 1 million inhabitants.

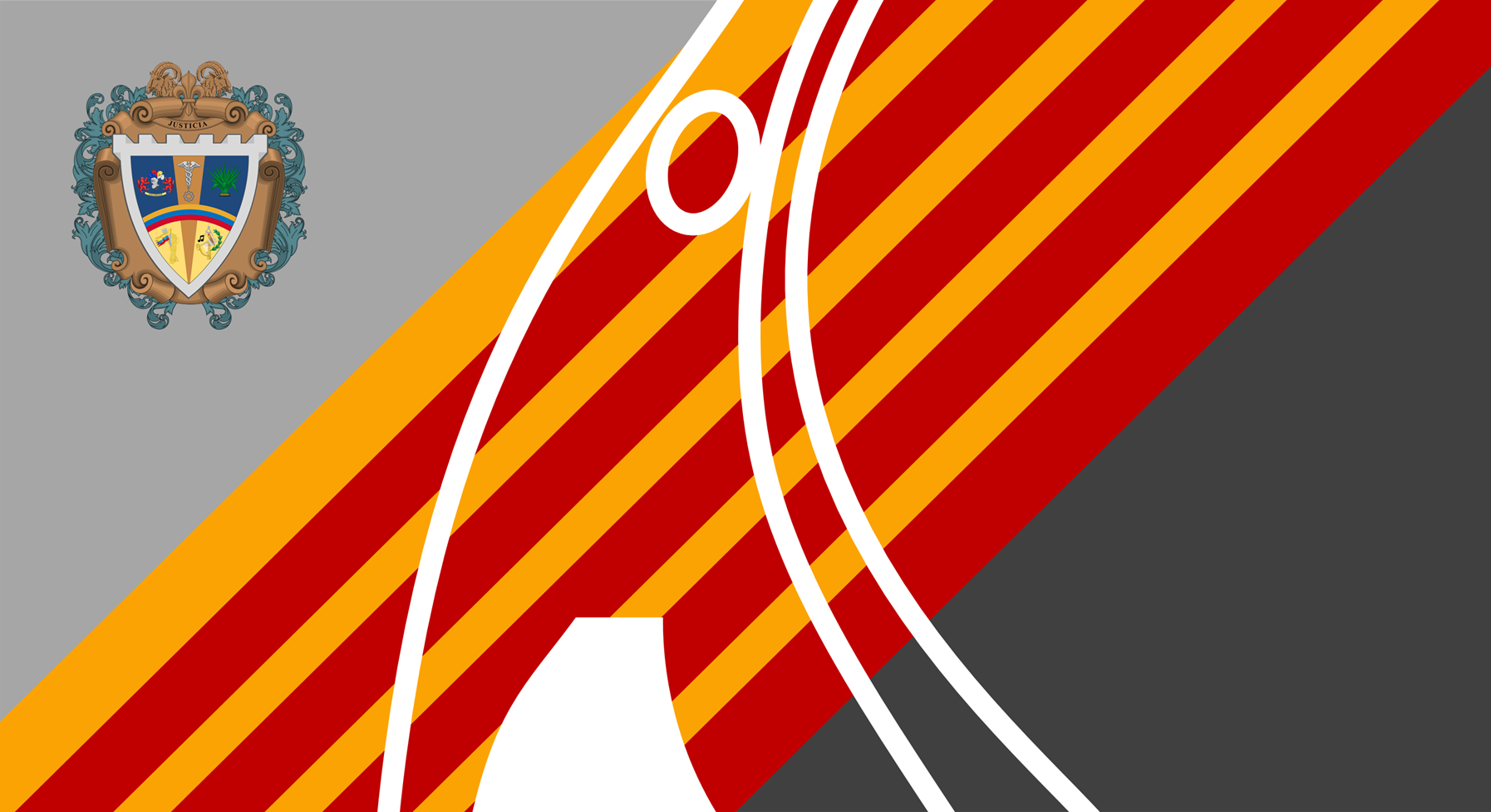
Flag of Barquisimeto, Venezuela

Flag of Barranquilla, Colombia

Flag of Belém, Brazil

Flag of Belo Horizonte, Brazil

Flag of Bogotá, Colombia

Flag of Brasília, Brazil

Flag of Buenos Aires, Argentina

Flag of Cali, Colombia

Flag of Campinas, Brazil

Flag of Callao, Peru

Flag of Córdoba, Argentina

Flag of Cusco, Peru

Flag of Curitiba, Brazil

Flag of Fortaleza, Brazil

Flag of Goiânia, Brazil

Flag of Guarulhos, Brazil

Flag of Guayaquil, Ecuador

Flag of Lima, Peru

Flag of Maceió, Brazil

Flag of Manaus, Brazil

Flag of Maracaibo, Venezuela

Flag of Medellín, Colombia

Flag of Porto Alegre, Brazil

Flag of Quito, Ecuador

Flag of Recife, Brazil

Flag of Rio de Janeiro, Brazil

Flag of Salvador, Brazil

Flag of Santa Cruz de la Sierra, Bolivia

Flag of Santiago, Chile

Flag of São Gonçalo, Brazil

Flag of São Luís, Brazil

Flag of São Paulo, Brazil

== Historical flags ==
Flag	Date	Use	Description
	1822	Flag of the Kingdom of Brazil	
	1822 – 1853	Flag of the Empire of Brazil	
	1853 – 1889	Flag of the Empire of Brazil	
	1889	Flag of the First Brazilian Republic	
	1889 – 1960	Flag of Brazil	
	1960 – 1968	Flag of Brazil	
	1968 – 1992	Flag of Brazil	
	1876 – 1925	Flag of the Falkland Islands	
	1925 – 1948	Flag of the Falkland Islands	
	1948 – 1999	Flag of the Falkland Islands	
	1875 – 1906	Flag of British Guiana	
	1906 – 1919	Flag of British Guiana	
	1919 – 1955	Flag of British Guiana	
	1955 – 1966	Flag of British Guiana	
	1821 – 1822	Flag of the Protectorate of Peru	
	1822	Flag of the Peruvian Republic	
	1822 – 1825	Flag of the Peruvian Republic	
	1836 – 1839	Flag of the Peru-Bolivian Confederation	
	1992 – 1999	Flag of South Georgia and the South Sandwich Islands	
	1959 – 1975	Flag of Suriname	
	1828 – 1830	Flag of Uruguay	
	1811 – 1812	Flag of the First Republic of Venezuela	
	1813 – 1814	Flag of the Second Republic of Venezuela	
	1817 – 1819; 1859	Flag of the Third Republic of Venezuela	
	1830 – 1836	Flag of the State of Venezuela	
	1836 – 1859	Flag of the State of Venezuela	
	1859 – 1863	Flag of the Republic of Venezuela	
	1863 – 1905	Flag of the United States of Venezuela	
	1905 – 1930	Flag of the United States of Venezuela	
	1930 – 2006	Flag of Venezuela	

== See also ==
- Flags of North America
- Flag of Gran Colombia
- Flags depicting the Southern Cross
- List of countries
- Sun of May
- Wiphala

Lists of flags of South American countries

- List of Argentine flags
- List of Brazilian flags
- List of Chilean flags
- List of Colombian flags
- List of Ecuadorian flags
- List of flags of Peru
- List of Uruguayan flags
- List of flags of Venezuela
