= Castle of Clavijo =

Castle in La Rioja, Spain

Coordinates: 42.350471°N 2.427403°W

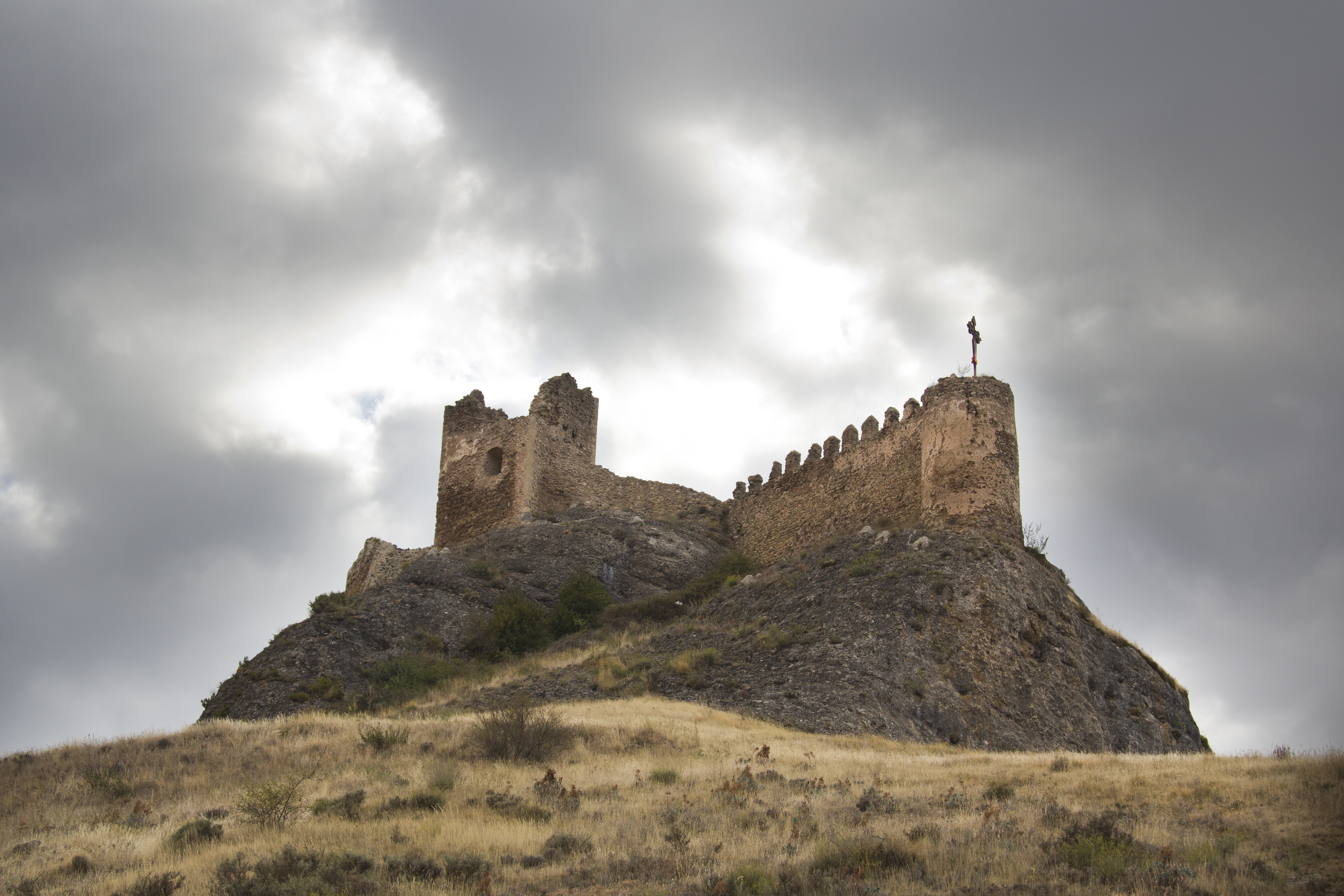
View of the castle of Clavijo

The Castle of Clavijo, one of the most famous in the area of La Rioja, Spain, is located on top of an imposing rock, dominating the surrounding land in the municipality of the same name in La Rioja, 15 kilometres (9.3 mi) from the capital, Logroño.

== Background ==
The first news of the castle appears in 960, the year in which Fernán González was imprisoned within its walls. Sancho el Mayor de Navarra ceded the fortress to the Albelda monastery. In 1177, Clavijo belonged to the Crown. Don Diego López de Zúñiga was its owner in the 14th century and gave it to his son as a wedding gift.

== Description ==
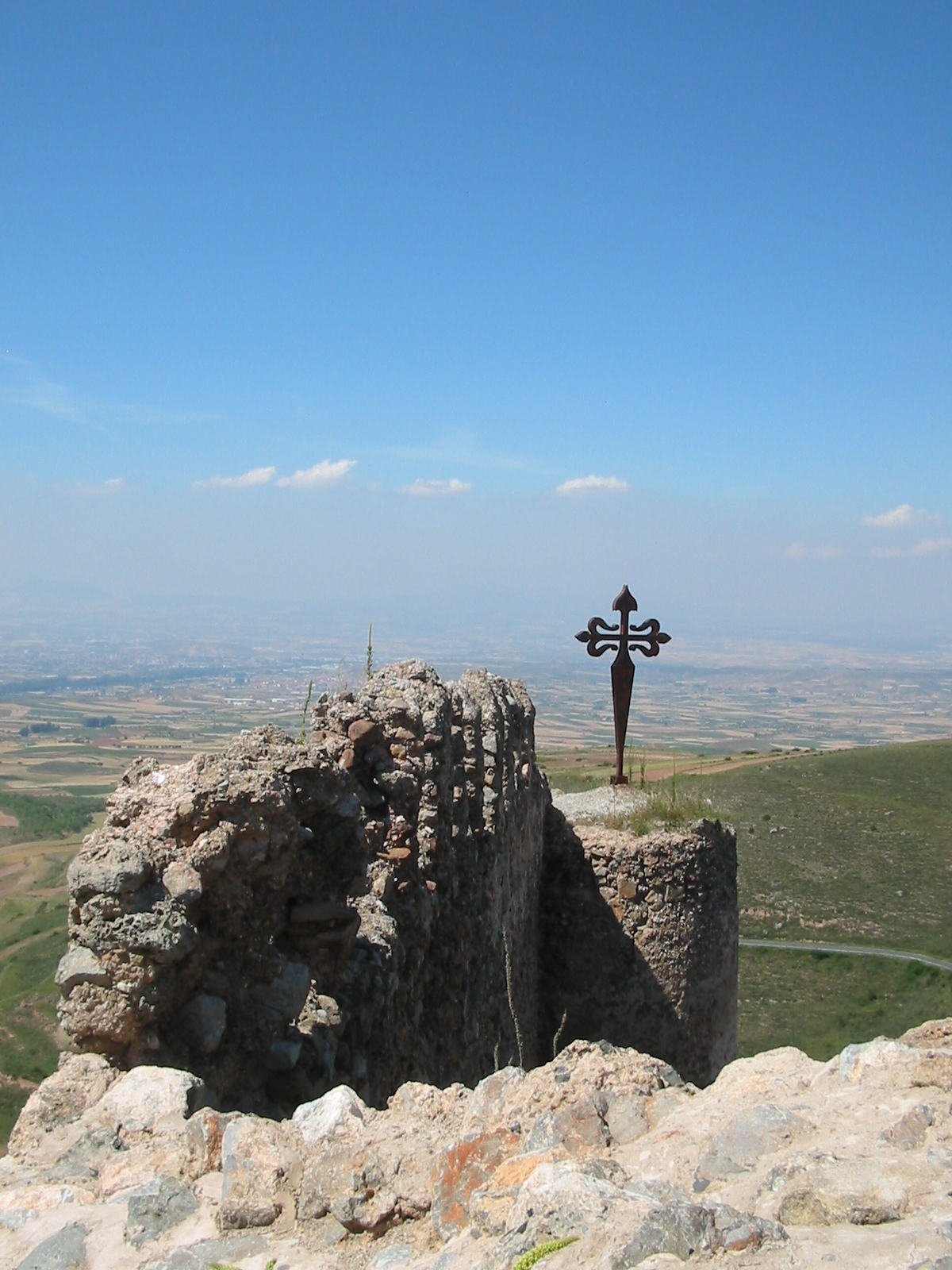
The Cross of Santiago on the wall.

The primary material used is stone, arranged in masonry around the entire building. The stone is barely worked and has been sourced from nearby rocks.

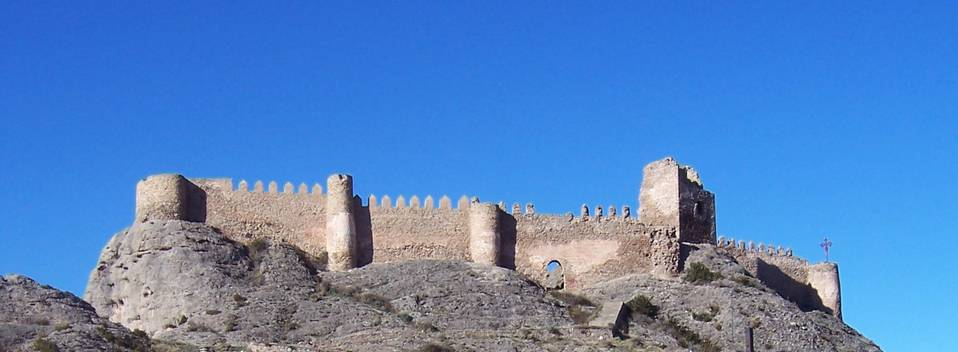
View from the village.

The castle's layout is elongated, conforming to the shape of the hill on which it stands. It provided protection through a wall that extended across the entire rocky formation, surrounding the village of Clavijo. Access is available via a steep path on the side of the rock facing the village. Next to the entrance to the fortification, topped with a horseshoe arch, stands the keep, which is in a very deteriorated condition. Near the tower, the other rooms were distributed, including a courtyard and a small chamber.

Currently, the castle is owned by the Government of La Rioja.
