= List of Chilean flags =

This is a list of flags used in Chile. For more information about the national flag, visit the article Flag of Chile.

== National flags ==
Flag	Date	Use	Description
	1818–present	National flag and ensign	Horzontal bicolor of white over red, with a square blue canton bearing a white five-pointed star.
	1818–present	Flag of Chile (vertical)	The reverse side of the flag, turned so that the blue canton is at the top left.

== Government ==
Flag	Date	Use	Description
	1920– (creation); 1967– (legal regulation)	Presidential flag	The flag of Chile with the Chilean coat of arms in the center.
		Judiciary flag	

== Military ==
Flag	Date	Use	Description
		Flag of the Ministry of National Defense	A dark blue flag with the Chilean coat of arms in the center.

=== Army ===
Flag	Date	Rank	Description
Current
		Flag of the Chilean Army	A red flag with the army emblem in the center.
Rank flags
	?–present	General of the Army	
	?–present	General of division	
	?–present	General of brigade	
	?–present	Military Attaché (if they have the rank of brigadier or colonel)	

=== Chilean Navy ===
==== Jack ====
Flag	Date	Use	Description
Current
	1945–present	Naval jack	A square blue flag with a star in the center

==== Rank flags ====
Flag	Date	Rank	Description
Current
	?–present	Commander-in-Chief	
	?–present	Vice admiral	
	?–present	Rear admiral	
	?–present	Rear admiral (not in command)	
	?–present	Rear admiral (Task Force)	
	?–present	Commodore or captain	
	?–present	Commodore or captain (not in command)	
	?–present	Chief officers	
	?–present	Command pennant of a base or district commander	
	?–present	Command pennant of a base or district commander (not in command)	
Civilian dignitaries on board
	?–present	Ambassador, minister of state, minister plenipotentiary, or minister resident	
	?–present	Regional quartermaster or temporary chargé d'affaires	
	?–present	Consul general, consul, Provincial governor or vice-consul	
Former
	20th century	Minister of Marine	
	?–?	Ambassador, minister of state, minister plenipotentiary, or minister resident	A blue flag with white-edged red nordic cross and a white star in the canton. Used as a pennant on a car.
	?–?	Regional quartermaster or temporary chargé d'affaires	
	?–?	Consul general, consul, Provincial governor or vice-consul	

==== Other ====
Flag	Date	Use	Description
Current
	?–present	Masthead pennant	

=== Air force ===
Flag	Date	Rank	Description
Current
		Flag of the Chilean Air Force	A sky blue flag with the coat of arms of the Chilean Air Force in the center.
Rank flags
	?–present	General of the Air	
	?–present	General of Aviation	
	?–present	General of Air Brigade	
	?–present	Commodore	

== Police ==
Flag	Date	Use	Description
Current
		Carabineros de Chile	
		Chilean Gendarmerie	

=== Customs ===
Flag	Date	Use	Description
Current
	?–present	National Customs Service	
	?–present	Pennant of Customs Inspection	
Former
	1930s–?	Pennant of Customs Inspection	

== Civil ensign ==
Flag	Date	Use	Description
Current
	?–present	Pilot flag	
	?–present	Pennant of Port Captains	
	?–present	Pennant of Health authority	
Former
	1930s–?	Pilot flag	
	1910s–1930s	Pilot flag	
	19th century–1910s	Pilot flag	
	1930s–?	Pennant of Port Captains	

== Regions ==
Flag	Date	Administrative division	Description
	2008–present	Arica and Parinacota	White flag with the Regional Government logo in the center.
	1996–present	Atacama	Main article: Flag of Atacama
	?–present	Antofagasta	Blue flag with the Regional Intendance logo
	2013–present	Aysén	White flag with the regional coat of arms in the center
	?–present	Biobío	White flag with the regional coat of arms in the center.
	2013–present	Coquimbo	Main article: Flag of Coquimbo Region
	?–present	La Araucanía	White flag with the regional coat of arms in the center.
	2013–present	Los Lagos	Main article: Flag of Los Lagos
	2008–present	Los Ríos	Main article: Flag of Los Ríos Region
	1997–present	Magallanes	Main article: Flag of Magallanes
	2002–present (last modification)	Maule	White flag with the regional coat of arms in the center.
	2018–present	Ñuble	White flag with the regional coat of arms in the center.
	?–present	O'Higgins	White flag with the regional coat of arms in the center.
	2013–present	Santiago Metropolitan Region	Dark grey flag with the Regional Government logo in the center.
	2008–present	Tarapacá	White flag with the coat of arms of Tarapacá Region in the center.
	?–present	Valparaíso	Blue flag with the regional coat of arms in the center.

=== Unofficial regional flags ===
Flag	Date	Use	Description
	2014–present	Unofficial flag of Arica y Parinacota Region ^{es}	
	1990s–present	Unofficial flag of Araucanía Region	Horizontal tricolor (blue, white, and red) with the regional coat of arms in the center.
		Unofficial flag of Bío-Bío Region	
	2014–present	Unofficial flag of Chilean glaciers	
		Unofficial flag of Chiloé Archipelago	
	2020–present	Unofficial flag of Chiloé Archipelago	

== Historical flags ==
=== National flags ===
Flag	Date	Use	Description
National flags
	1818–1912	Flag of the Republic of Chile	Design of the flag with the star tilted.
	1826–1854	Civil flag of the Republic of Chile	
	1818–1834	First design of the actual flag, also called "Independence Flag"	
	1818	Alternative flag of the Republic of Chile	Horizontal tricolor of white, blue, and red, with a white star in the blue band.
	1817–1818	Flag of the Republic of Chile, now also called "Transitory flag"	Horizontal tricolor of blue, white, and red.
	1812–1814	Flag of the Kingdom of Chile, also called Bandera de la Patria Vieja ("Old Fatherland Flag")	Horizontal tricolor of blue, white, and yellow.
	1812–1814	Flag of the Kingdom of Chile, also called Bandera de la Patria Vieja ("Old Fatherland Flag")	Horizontal tricolor of white, blue, and yellow. The Cross of Santiago is in the upper hoist corner, and the first coat of arms is centered in the blue band.
Local national flags
	1888–1902	Flag of the Kingdom of Easter Island	Main article: Flag of Easter Island
	1880–1888	Flag of the Kingdom of Easter Island	Main article: Flag of Easter Island
	1860s	A recreation of Dutrou-Bornier's flag	Main article: Flag of Easter Island
	1860s	Flag of the Kingdom of Easter Island	Main article: Flag of Easter Island
	1860–1862	Flag of the Kingdom of Araucania and Patagonia	Main article: Flag of the Mapuches § Kingdom of Araucanía and Patagonia

=== Other historical flags ===
Flag	Date	Use	Description
	1890s	Flag of the Selk'nam genocide survivors	Main article: Selk'nam flag
	1825–1904	Flag of the Litoral Department	Horizontal tricolor of blue, red, and yellow with the coat of arms off-centred toward the hoist.
	1820–1822	Flag used in Liberating Expedition of Peru	Similar to the national flag, with three stars.
	1817–1820	Flag of the Army of the Andes	
	18th and 19th centuries	Old Mapuche flag	Blue field with a guñelve (eight-pointed star).

== Ethnic groups flags ==
Flag	Date	Ethnic group	Description
	2020–present	Afro-Chileans	
	2012–present	Alacaluf	Two blue and green triangles divided by a white sash. In the blue triangle, a brown eight-point star. In the green triangle, a human figure made with brown circles.
	1979–present	Aymara	Main article: Wiphala
	2020–present	Chango	Three stripes with marine and reddish colors. A central element that groups together the activities of the town and representative silhouettes of the coastal mountain range and the waves of the sea. Nine white dots accompany the central circle.
	2017–present	Colla people in Chile	Four horizontal stripes yellow, white, red, and black.
	2018–present	Diaguita people in Chile	
	?–present	Huilliche people in Chiloé	Main article: Flag of the Mapuches
	?–present	Huilliche people in Osorno	Main article: Flag of the Mapuches
	1991–present	Mapuche people in Chile	Main article: Flag of the Mapuches
	2006–present	Rapa Nui	Main article: Flag of Easter Island
	2016–present	Selkʼnam	Main article: Selk'nam flag
		Yaghan from Mejillones	

== Political flags ==
Flag	Date	Party	Description
Current
	1988–present	National Renewal	
	1979–present	Chilean Communist Party (Proletarian Action)	
	1965–present	Revolutionary Left Movement	
	1957–present	Christian Democratic Party	
	1933–present	Socialist Party of Chile	
	1912–present	Communist Party of Chile	
Former
	2017–2019	Social Patriot Movement	
	2015–2017	Regional and Popular Front	
	2010s	Hod Chile	
	2008–2012	Front of the National Order	
	2004–2008	National Socialist Movement of Chilean Workers	
	1999–2010	New Fatherland Society	
	1998–2002	Liberal Party	
	1990–2002	Union of the Centrist Center	
	1983–1987	National Union Movement	
	1973–1989	MAPU Obrero Campesino	
	1971–2013	Citizen Left	
	1969–1994	Popular Unitary Action Movement	
	1973	Popular Unity	
	1972–1973	Popular Unity	
	1969–1972	Popular Unity	
	1966–1994	National Party	
	1952–1983	Revolutionary National Syndicalist Movement	
	1945–1958	Agrarian Labor Party	
	1938–1942	Popular Socialist Vanguard	
	1934–1940s	Araucan Federation	
Bandera_MNSCh	1932–1938	National Socialist Movement of Chile	
Bandera MNSCh alternativa	?	National Socialist Movement of Chile	
Other
	2019–2020	Social Outburst protest flag	

=== Rebel groups flags ===
Flag	Date	Organization	Description
Former
	1983–1999	Manuel Rodríguez Patriotic Front	
	1982–1994	Lautaro Youth Movement	
	1971–1973	Fatherland and Liberty	
	1968–1971	Organized Vanguard of the People	

== Sporting flags ==
Flag	Date	Use	Description
Current
	?–present	Chilean Olympic Committee	
	?–present	Football Federation of Chile	

== Antarctic base flags ==
Flag	Date	Base	Description
Current
	?–present	Captain Arturo Prat Base	Plain white field charged with the coat of arms of the base.

== Vexillology Association flags ==
Flag	Date	Use	Description
Current
	?–present	Corporación Nacional de Vexilología de Chile	

== Chilean shipping company ==
Flag	Date	Company	Description
Current
	1953–present	Empresa Marítima del Estado	
	1930–present	Compañía Chilena de Navegación Interoceánica	
	1872–present	Compañía Sudamericana de Vapores	

== Burgees of Chile ==
Cofradía Náutica del Pacífico Austral

Club de Yates Algarrobo

Club de Yates El Quisco

Club de Yates Higuerillas

Yacht Club de Chile

== Sources ==
- The Flags of Chile. Flags of the World
- National symbols of Chile. Chilean Government Official Website (in Spanish)
- Orígenes, mitos y hechos interesantes sobre los símbolos patrios chilenos (in Spanish)
- Decree 1534 of 1967 about National Symbols of Chile (in Spanish)
- Reino de Araucanía y Patagonia - Portal Mapuche (in Spanish)
