= List of Uruguayan flags =

Flags of Uruguay

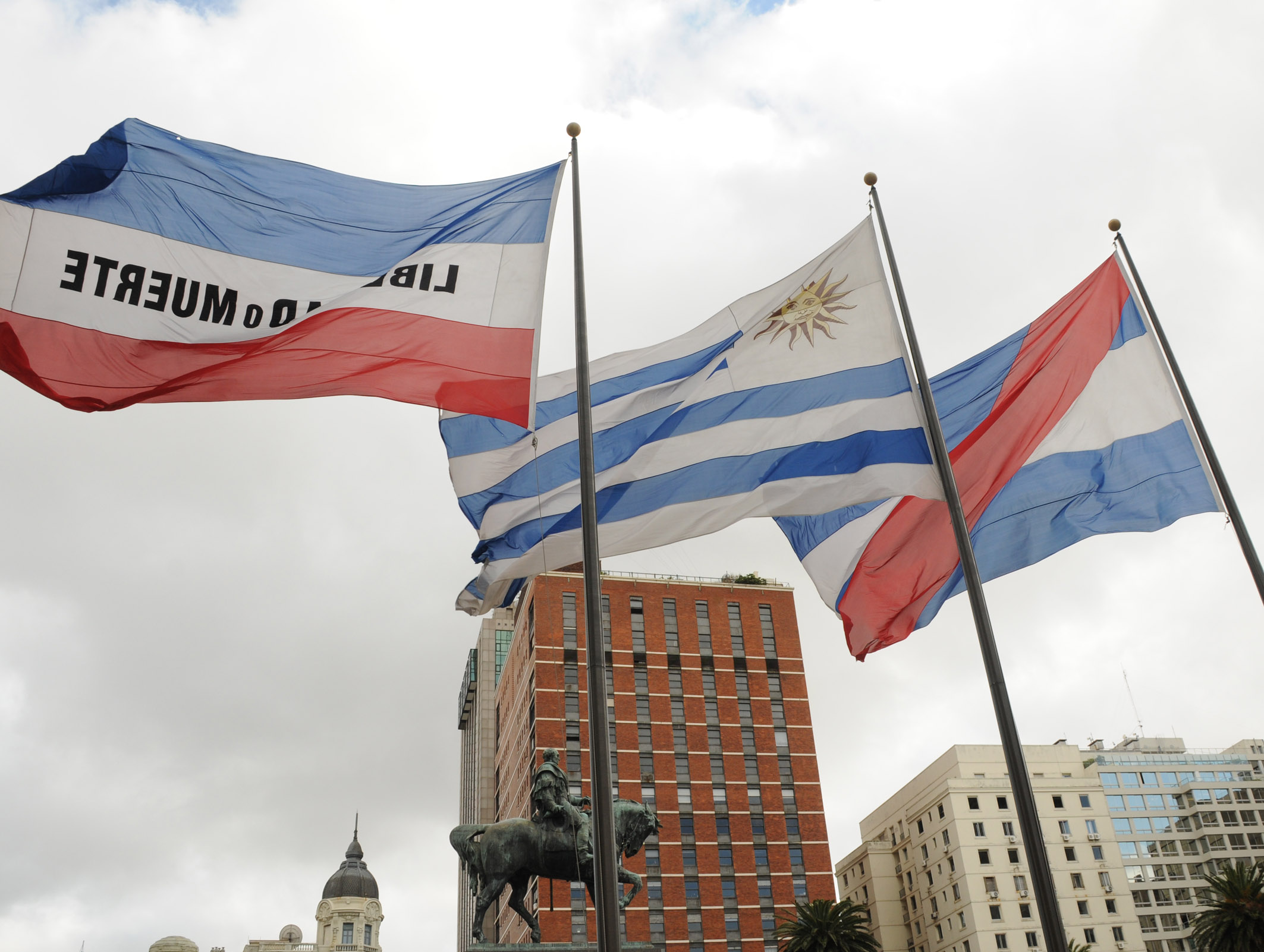
Official flags of Uruguay

This is a list of flags used in or otherwise associated with Uruguay.

== National flags ==
Uruguay has three co-official flags, only flown together by law on national holidays. Listed below in order of hierarchy:

| Flag | Date | Name | Description |
|---|---|---|---|
| | 1830–present | National flag | Four horizontal stripes of blue with the upper hoist-side corner bearing the Sun of May in the center over a white canvas. |
| | 1952–present | Artigas flag | A triband, composed of three equal horizontal bands coloured blue, white, and blue; with a red diagonal stripe from the upper hoist to the lower fly. |
| | 1952–present | Treinta y Tres flag | Three horizontal stripes: the top one blue, the center one white, and the bottom one red. Upon the white stripe are printed the words "Libertad o Muerte" ("Freedom or Death"). |

== Military ==
=== Army ===
| Flag | Date | Rank | Description |
Current
| | ?–present | Flag of the National Army of Uruguay | A light brown field with the army emblem in the center. |

=== Uruguay Navy ===
==== Jack ====
| Flag | Date | Use | Description |
Current
| | 1990s–present | Jack of the National Navy of Uruguay | A white field with a blue saltire that extends to the corners of the flag and the Sun of May in the center. |
Former
| | 1930s–1990s | Jack of the National Navy of Uruguay | |
| | 1817–1930s | Jack of the National Navy of Uruguay | |

==== Rank flags ====
| Flag | Date | Rank | Description |
Current
| | ?–present | Ministry of National Defense | |
| | ?–present | Commander in Chief | |
| | ?–present | Vice admiral | |
| | ?–present | Rear admiral | |
| | ?–present | Captain commanding a naval force | |
| | ?–present | Commander of a naval squadron | |
| | ?–present | Seniority pennant | |
Former
| | ?–? | Ministry of National Defense | |
| | ?–? | Inspector general | |
| | ?–? | Officer commanding the division of ships | |
| | ?–? | Officer commanding of two or more ships | |

==== Navy Academy ====
| Flag | Date | Use | Description |
Current
| | | Uruguay Naval Academy | |

==== Other ====
| Flag | Date | Use | Description |
Current
| | | War pennant | |
Former
| | 1815–1820 | Flag of the privateers in the service of the League of the Free Peoples | |

=== Air force ===
| Flag | Date | Use | Description |
Current
| | 1953–present | Flag of the Uruguayan Air Force | A blue field with the Air Force emblem in the center. |
| | ?–present | Inspector general | |
| | ?–present | Group commander | |
| | ?–present | Squadron leader | |

== Civil ensign ==
| Flag | Date | Use | Description |
Current
| | ?–present | Pilot flag | |

== Police ==
| Flag | Date | Use | Description |
Current
| | ?–present | National Police of Uruguay | |

== Department flags ==
| Flag | Date | Administrative division | Description |
|---|---|---|---|
| | 1995–present | Artigas Department | |
| | 2010–present | Canelones Department | |
| | 2018–present | Cerro Largo Department | |
| | ?–present | Colonia Department | |
| | 2000–present | Durazno Department | |
| | 1987–present | Flores Department | |
| | 1990–present | Florida Department | |
| | ?–present | Lavalleja Department | |
| | ?–present | Maldonado Department | |
| | 1992–present | Paysandú Department | |
| | 1995–present | Rio Negro Department | |
| | 1998–present | Rivera Department | |
| | ?–present | Rocha Department | |
| | 1997–present | Salto Department | |
| | 1999–present | San José Department | |
| | 1994–present | Soriano Department | |
| | 2003–present | Treinta y Tres Department | |

== Historical flags ==
| Flag | Date | Use | Description |
National flags
| | 1840s | Flag of the Gobierno de la Defensa | |
| | 1840s | Flag of the Gobierno del Cerrito | Similar to the current flag. |
| | 1828–1830 | Flag of Uruguay | Nine horizontal stripes of light blue with the upper hoist-side corner bearing the Sun of May in the center over a white canvas. |
| | 1825–1828 | Flag of the Oriental Province | A triband, composed of three equal horizontal bands coloured blue, white, and red. |
| | 1820–1828 | Flag of the Cisplatina Province | A triband, composed of three equal horizontal bands coloured green, white, and green; with the province's emblem in the center. |
| | 1814–1815 | First flag of the League of the Free Peoples, also known as the flag of Artigas | A triband, composed of three equal horizontal bands coloured blue, white, and blue; with red stripes inside the blue bands. |

== Ethnic groups flags ==
| Flag | Date | Ethnic group | Description |
|---|---|---|---|
| | 1990s–present | Charrúa | |

== Political flags ==
| Flag | Date | Party | Description |
Current
| | 2013–present | Popular Unity | |
| | 2008–present | Anti-imperialist Unitary Commissions | |
| | 2002–present | Independent Party | |
| | 1984–present | Workers' Party | |
| | 1975–present | Party for the Victory of the People | |
| | 1971–present | Broad Front Party | |
| | 2020s–present | Christian Democratic Party of Uruguay | |
| | ?–present | Christian Democratic Party of Uruguay | |
| | 1960s | Christian Democratic Party of Uruguay | |
| | 1956–present | Uruguayan Anarchist Federation | |
| | 1904–present | National Party | |
| | 1897–1904 | National Party | |
| | 1836–present | Colorado Party | |
Former
| | 2013–2019 | Concertation Party^{es} | |
| | 1932–1938 | Independent Democratic Feminist Party | |

=== Rebel groups flags ===
| Flag | Date | Organization | Description |
Former
| | 1967–1972 | Tupamaros | |

== Sporting flags ==
| Flag | Date | Use | Description |
|---|---|---|---|
| | ?–present | Uruguayan Football Association | |

== Burgees of Uruguay ==
| Flag | Date | Use | Description |
|---|---|---|---|
| | 1924–present | Flag of The Punta del Este Yacht Club | |
| | 1906–present | Flag of The Yacht Club Uruguayo | |

== See also ==
- Flag of Uruguay
- Coat of arms of Uruguay
