= Tarta de Santiago =

Traditional dessert from Galicia

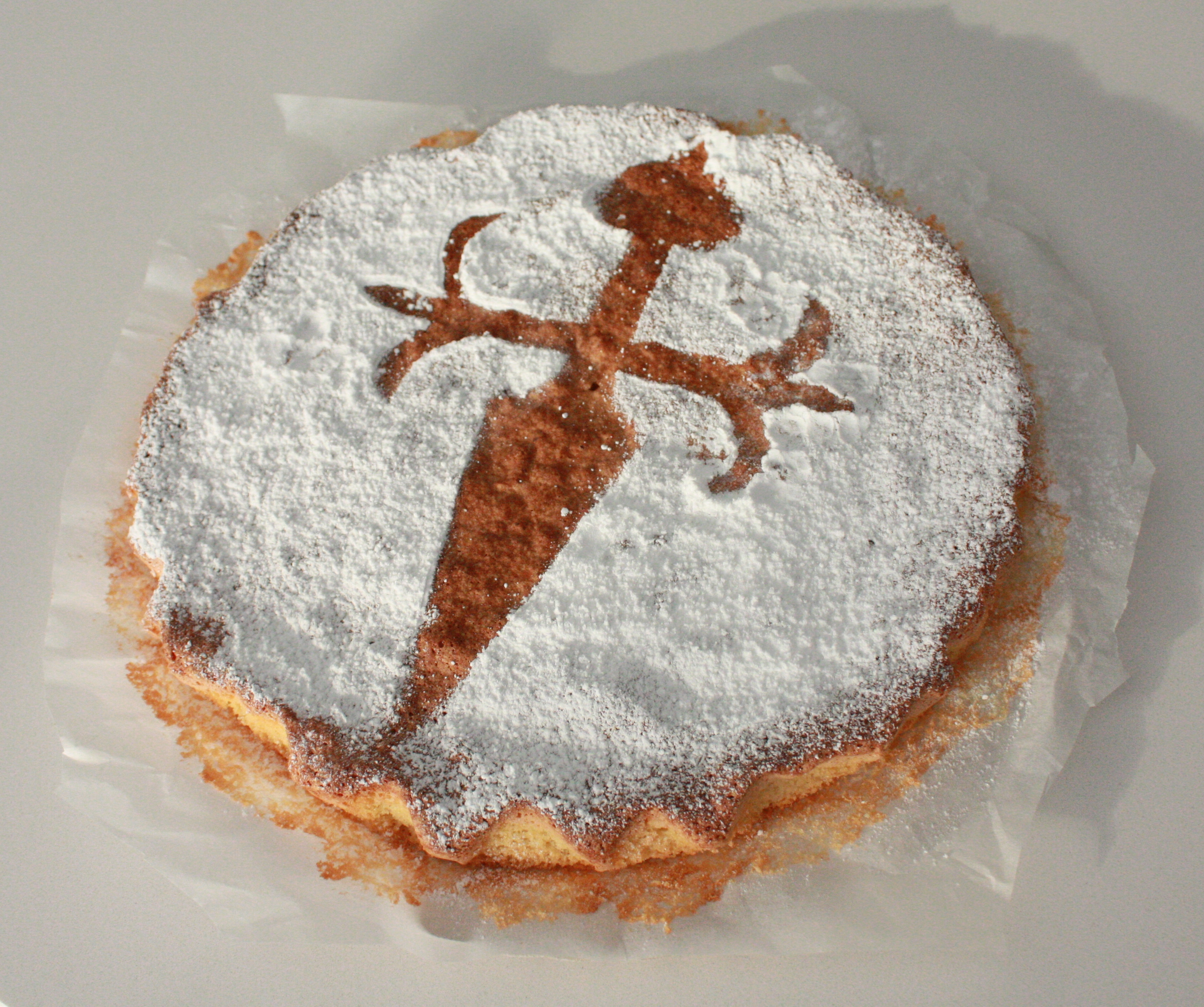
- Typical presentation with the Cross of the Order of Santiago
- Alternative names: Torta de Santiago (in Galician)
- Course: Dessert
- Place of origin: Spain
- Region or state: Galicia
- Serving temperature: Chilled/room temperature
- Main ingredients: Ground almonds

Torta de Santiago (in Galician) or Tarta de Santiago (in Spanish), (Note: Torta is the Galician word for cake, while tarta is the Spanish word.) literally meaning cake of St. James, is an almond cake or pie from Galicia with its origin in the Middle Ages and the Camino de Santiago. The ingredients mainly consist of ground almonds (almond flour), eggs, and sugar, with additional flavouring of lemon zest, sweet wine, brandy, or grape marc, depending on the recipe used. It is the most well known of the cakes of Galicia.

Torta de Santiago has a round shape and can be made with or without a base which can be either puff pastry or shortcrust pastry. The top of the pie is decorated with powdered sugar, stencilled by a silhouette of the Cross of Saint James (cruz de Santiago) which gives the pastry its name. The origin of the cross being decorated on the cake dates to 1924 when the "Casa Mora" began to adorn the almond cakes with the silhouette. The cross is a symbol of the Camino de Santiago pilgrimages, and the cake said to reward pilgrims upon the completion of their journey.

Food writer Claudia Roden traces the origins of the cake to the 11th century, as Jews fleeing the Almohad Caliphate headed north, bringing their almond Passover cake. The application for protected geographic status identifies the first documentary evidence of the cake's existence as dating to 1577, when it was mentioned in notes of what was being eaten at the University of Santiago de Compostela.

In May 2010, the EU gave Tarta de Santiago PGI status within Europe. To qualify, the cake must be made in the Autonomous Community of Galicia and contain at least 33% almonds, excluding the base. The cake is sold by many restaurants and bakeries in the region.

== Gallery ==
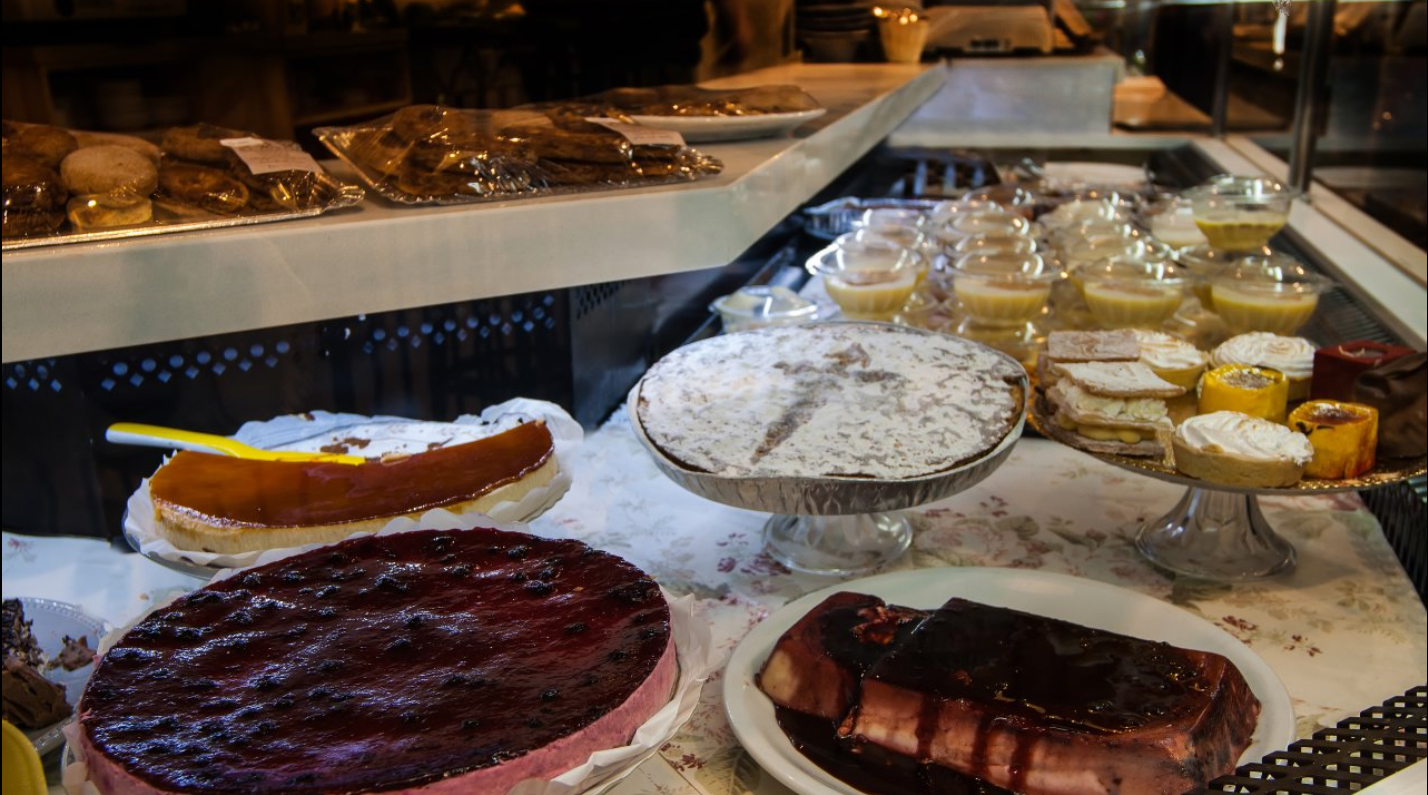
Tarta de Santiago in a restaurant's cake display, in the Spanish city of Valladolid.

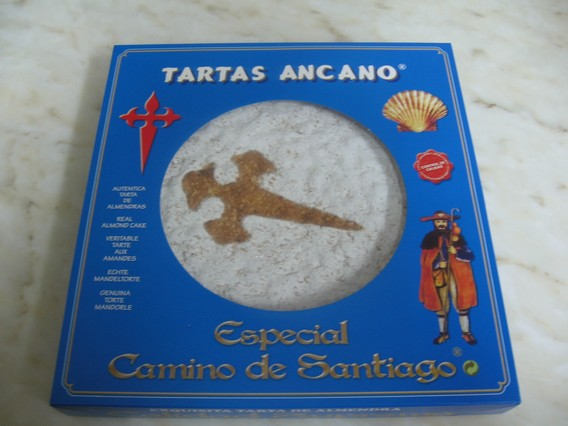
A version sold on the Camino de Santiago.

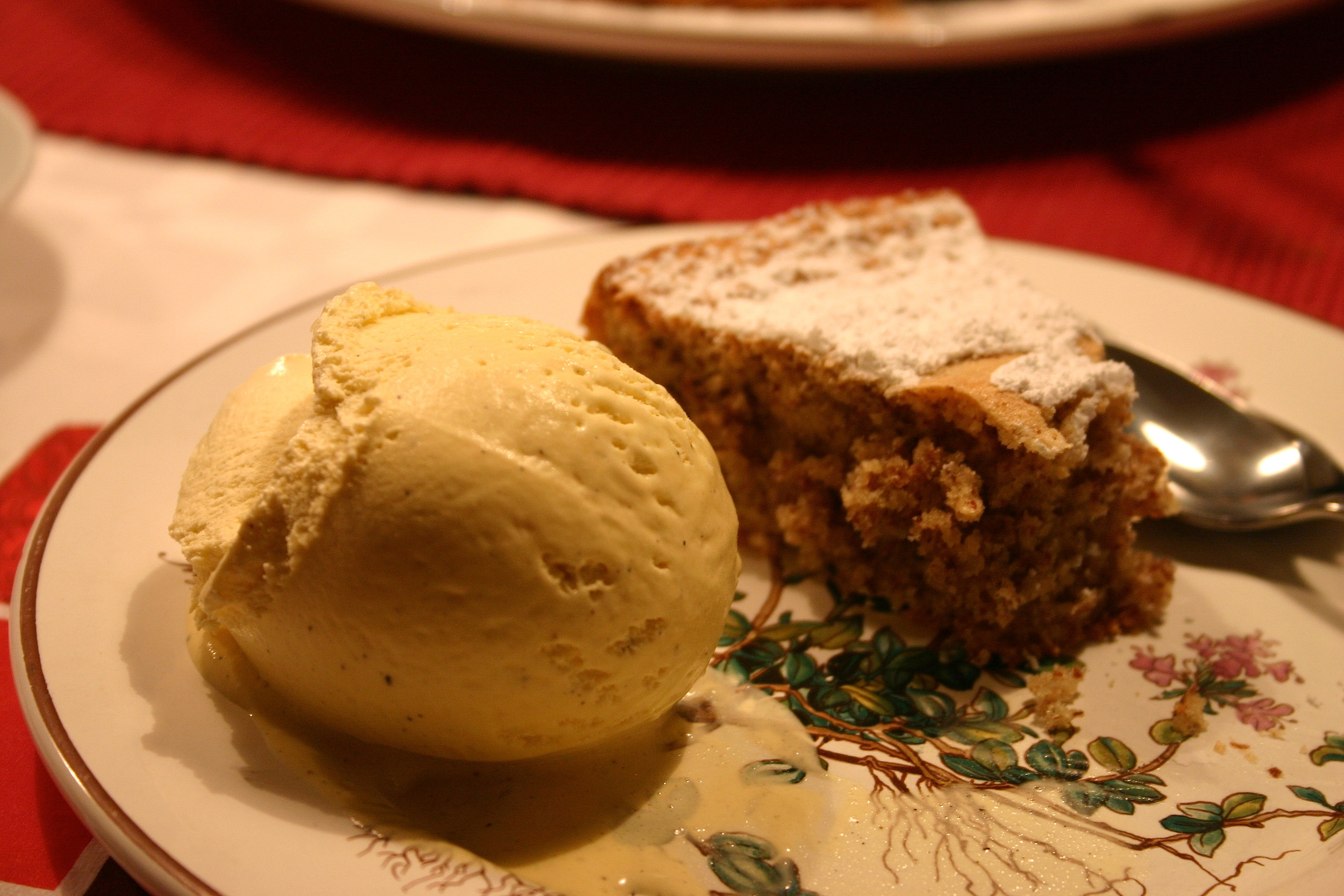
A slice, with ice cream

== See also ==
- List of almond dishes
