= Flag of Magallanes =

Chilean regional flag

Magallanes
- La Magallánica
- Use: Civil and state flag, civil ensign
- Proportion: 2:3
- Adopted: 5 February 1997; 29 years ago

The flag of Magallanes y la Antártica Chilena Region is one of the regional symbols of the Chilean Magallanes y la Antártica Chilena Region. This flag, along with other regional symbols, was officially adopted by the Regional Council by Resolution No. 42, adopted on 15 October 1996 and published on 5 February 1997. Because the municipality of Antártica administratively belongs to this region, this flag is sometimes used to represent the territory claimed by Chile in Antarctica. The flag must be hoisted in all private and public buildings on September 21 (in remembrance of the discovery of the Magellan Strait by Ferdinand Magellan), September 29 (in remembrance of the annexation of Magallanes to Chile) and October 21 (Regional Day).

== Design and symbolism ==
The regional flag is a blue field, in the bottom of which stands a golden strip highlighting six peaks, which are covered on top by a white border. On top of these, and in front of blue background, is placed the Southern Cross on a slant and white stars.

According to the official symbolism, the blue color represents the night sky, while the golden peaks symbolize the steppe region, while white indicates the snow that often falls in winter. The Southern Cross symbolizes the position of the area.

== See also ==
- List of Chilean flags
- List of Antarctic flags
