= List of Colombian flags =

Flags of Colombia

This is a list of flags used in Colombia. For more information about the national flag, visit the article Flag of Colombia.

== National flags ==
Flag	Date	Use	Description
	November 26, 1861 –	Flag of Colombia	

== Presidential standards ==
Flag	Date	Use	Description
		Presidential standard	

== Military ==
Flag	Date	Use	Description
		Military flag of Colombia	

=== Army ===
Flag	Date	Use	Description
		National Army flag	
		Flag of Nueva Granada Military University	

=== Navy ===
Flag	Date	Use	Description
		National Navy flag	
	November 12, 1932 –	Naval ensign of Colombia	
	1863–1886	Naval ensign of the United States of Colombia	
	1831–1858	Naval ensign of New Granada	
		Naval jack of Colombia	
		Standard of the Colombian Navy	
		Naval pennant	
		Admiral rank flag	
		Vice-admiral rank flag	
		Rear-admiral rank flag	
		Commander of the Navy rank flag	
		Commander of a Colombian Navy Division	

=== Air Force ===
Flag	Date	Use	Description
		National Air Force flag	
		Air Force Garrison flag	

== Police ==
Flag	Date	Use	Description
		National Police of Colombia	

== Civil ensign ==
Flag	Date	Use	Description
	January 11, 1934 –	Civil ensign	
	1863–1890	Civil ensign of the United States of Colombia	
	1831–1857	Civil ensign of New Granada	

== Departments ==
Flag	Administrative division	Adopted	Description
	Amazonas	1974	Flag of Amazonas
	Antioquia	1812/1962	Flag of Antioquia
	Arauca	1979	
	Atlántico	1989	
	Bolívar	1886	Flag of Bolívar
	Boyacá	1968	Flag of Boyacá
	Caldas		
	Caquetá	1974	
	Casanare		Flag of Casanare
	Cauca		
	Cesar		Flag of Cesar
	Chocó		
	Córdoba	1951	
	Cundinamarca	1813	
	Guainía		
	Guaviare		
	Huila	1952	
	La Guajira	1966	Flag of La Guajira
	Magdalena	1886	Flag of Magdalena
	Meta	1970	
	Nariño		
	Norte de Santander	1978	Flag of Norte de Santander
	Putumayo		Flag of Putumayo
	Quindío		Flag of Quindío
	Risaralda	1969	
	San Andrés y Providencia	1818	
	Santander	1972	Flag of Santander
	Sucre	1974	
	Tolima		
	Valle del Cauca	1811	Flag of Valle del Cauca
	Vaupés	1984	
	Vichada		

== Political flags ==
Flag	Date	Use	Description
current
	?	Colombian Conservative Party	
	?	Colombian Liberal Party	
	?	Colombian Communist Party	
	2021–present 1990–2006	National Salvation Movement	
	2015–present	People's Revolutionary Movement^{es}	
	2001–present	Clan del Golfo	
	1991–present	Hope, Peace, and Liberty	
	1990s–present	Raizal nationalist flag	
	1985–present	Patriotic Union	
	1967–present	Popular Liberation Army	
	1964–present	National Liberation Army	
	1964–present	Revolutionary Armed Forces of Colombia	
former
	2003–2011	Independent Democratic Pole	
	1997–2008	United Self-Defense Forces of Colombia	
	1993–2008	Guevarista Revolutionary Army	
	1991–1994	Socialist Renovation Movement^{es}	
	1987 – early 1990s	Simón Bolívar Guerrilla Coordinating Board	
	1985–2007	People's Revolutionary Army	
	1984–1991	Movimiento Armado Quintin Lame	
	1982–1991	Workers Revolutionary Party of Colombia	
	1974–1990	19th of April Movement	
	1980s	JBC^{ca}	
	1961–1998	National Popular Alliance	
	1959–1967	Liberal Revolutionary Movement^{es}	
	1926–1930	Revolutionary Socialist Party (Colombia)	

== Ethnic groups flags ==
Flag	Date	Use	Description
	?	Flag of Native Colombians	
	?	Muzo people	

== Historical flags ==
Flag	Date	Use	Description
	1506–1717	Flag of the New Kingdom of Granada (Cross of Burgundy flag), military flag of Spain also used as flag of the Overseas Territories.	
	1717–1785	Military flag of Spain, in use for the Viceroyalty of New Granada	
	1785–1819	War ensign of Spain, in use for the Viceroyalty of New Granada	
	1810	Flag used, according to tradition, by the revolutionaries that promoted the creation of the government junta of Santa Fe during the events that lead to the drafting of the Colombian Declaration of Independence on July 20, 1810	
	1811–1815	Flag of the Free and Independent State of Cundinamarca	
	1811–1814	Flag of Cartagena de Indias, in use for the United Provinces of New Granada	
	1814–1816	Flag of Cartagena de Indias, in use for the United Provinces of New Granada	
	1819–1820	First flag of Great Colombia	
	1820–1821	Second flag of Great Colombia	
	1821–1831	Third flag of Great Colombia	
	1830–1834	Flag of the Republic of New Granada	
	1834 – July 26, 1861	Flag of the Republic of New Granada and the Granadine Confederation	
	July 26, 1861 – November 26, 1861	Flag of the United States of New Granada	

== Flag proposals ==
Flag	Date	Use	Description
	1822	Gran Colombia fourth flag proposal	
	1833	New Granada flag proposal	

== Burgees of Colombia ==
Flag	Club
	Club Náutico El Portillo

== See also ==
- Cundinamarca flags
- Coat of arms of Colombia
- ¡Oh, Gloria Inmarcesible!
