= Cross of Saint James =

Heraldic symbol of Spain

Cross of Saint James as used by the Order of Santiago

The Cross of Saint James, also known as the Santiago cross, cruz espada, or Saint James' Cross, is a cruciform (cross-shaped) heraldic badge. The cross, shaped as a cross fitchy, combines with either a cross fleury or a cross moline. Its most common version is a red cross resembling a sword, with the hilt and the arm in the shape of a fleur-de-lis.

The cross gets its name from James the Greater and the account of his appearance at the mythical Battle of Clavijo in the Spanish victory over the Moors. It is used throughout Spain and Portugal.

== Background and use ==
In heraldry, the cross is also called the Santiago cross or the cruz espada (English: sword cross). It is a charge, or symbol, in the form of a cross. The design combines a cross fitchy or fitchée, one whose lower limb comes to a point, with either a cross fleury, the arms of which end in fleurs-de-lis, or a cross moline where the ends of the arms are forked and rounded.

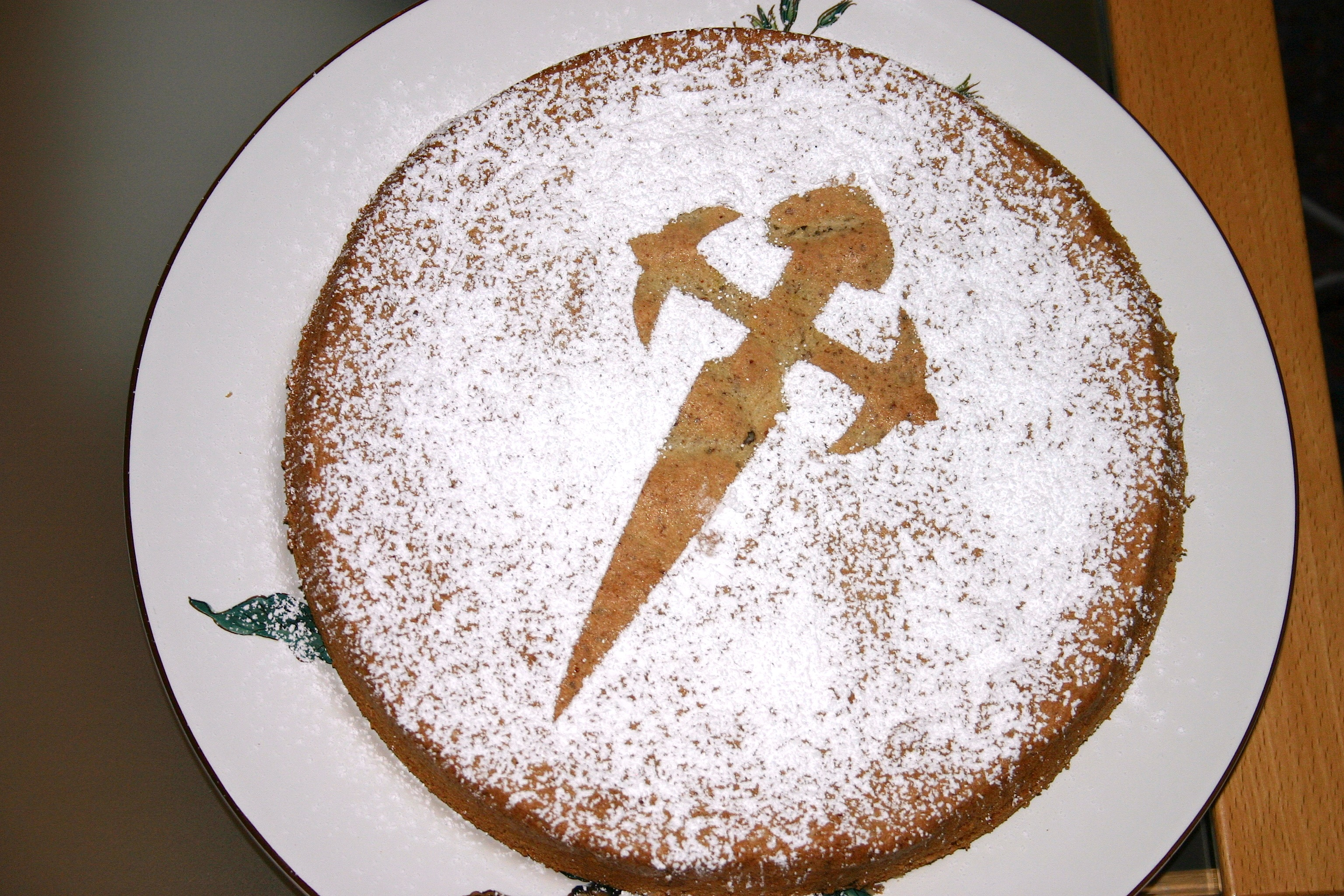
Tarta de Santiago

Since the early part of the 20th century, the cross has been used as a decorative element on the almond pastry Tarta de Santiago. A traditional Galician dessert made from ground almonds, the top of the pie is decorated with powdered sugar, masked by an imprint of the cross which gives the dessert its name.

A red cross on a white field is a common design for a Christian cross. The cross is the symbol of the crucifixion, the white color symbolizing purity, and the red color symbolizes the blood of Christ. A red Cross of Saint James, with flourished arms and scalloped top, over a field of white was the emblem of the 12th-century Spanish Order of Santiago and Portuguese Military Order of Saint James of the Sword. Both were named after James the Greater.

In Spain, the Order of Santiago, a religious and military order, was founded in the 12th century to protect the pilgrims on the Camino, and to defend Christendom against the Moors then on the Iberian Peninsula. Knights of the order wore the cross stamped on their standards and white capes. The Military Order of Saint James of the Sword in Portugal also use the symbol as part of its insignia.

The three fleurs-de-lis represent the "honor without stain," which is in reference to the character of the Apostles. The sword is said to represent both the manner of his martyrdom, as he was beheaded with a sword, and James' role in the Battle of Clavijo. In Spain, the cross is also related to James' role at the mythical battle, wherein the saint appeared to Ramiro I of Asturias after the king prayed to him as the patron saint of Galicia for help leading the army to victory over the Moors.

== Gallery ==
Examples of the cross displayed on the Way of Saint James

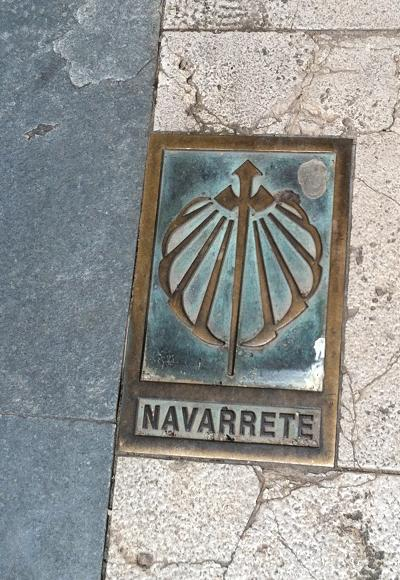
A pavement marker indicates the route of the Way of St James through Navarrete, La Rioja, Spain

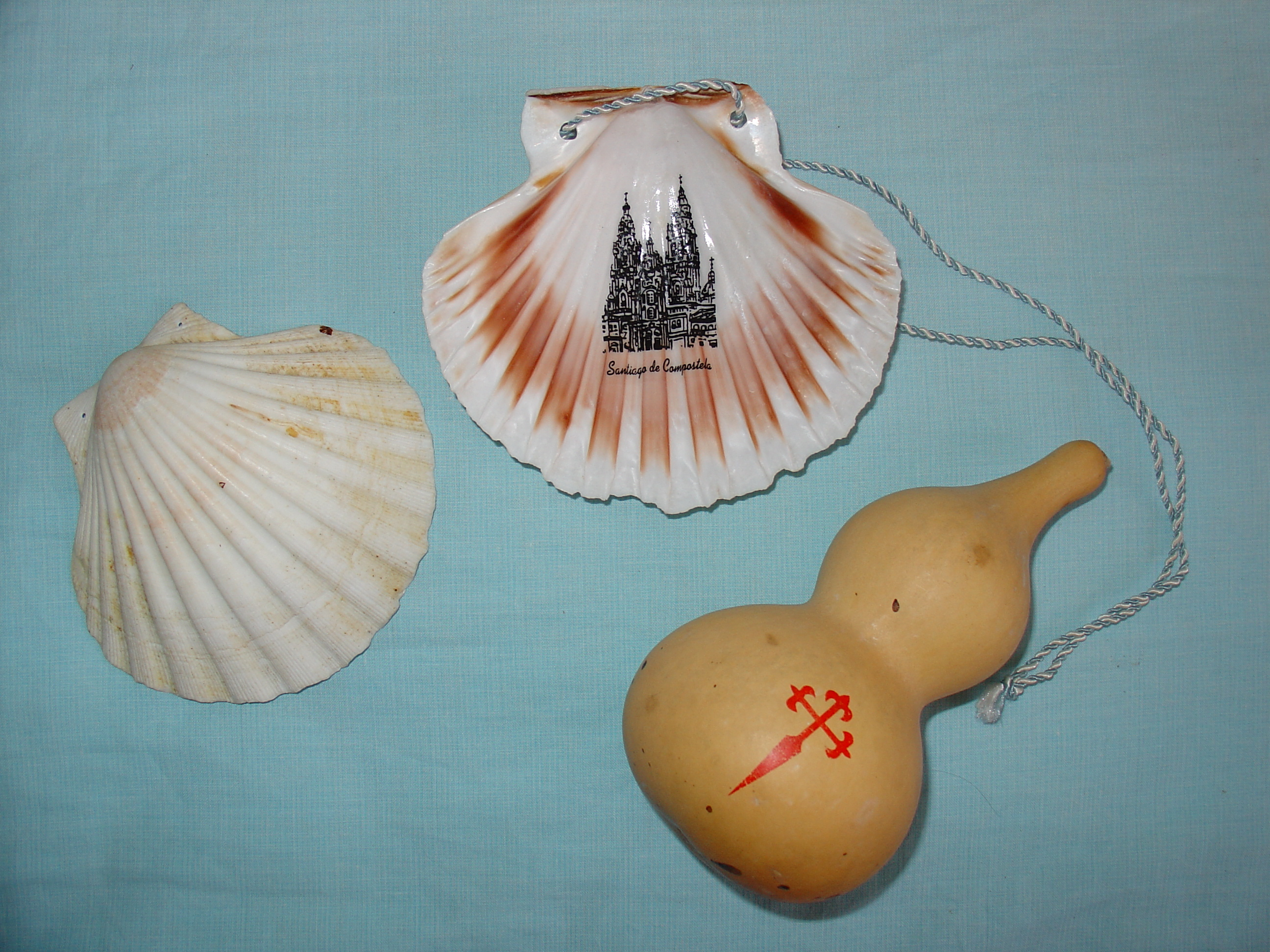
St James pilgrim accessories (Note the cross on the shepherd's gourd)

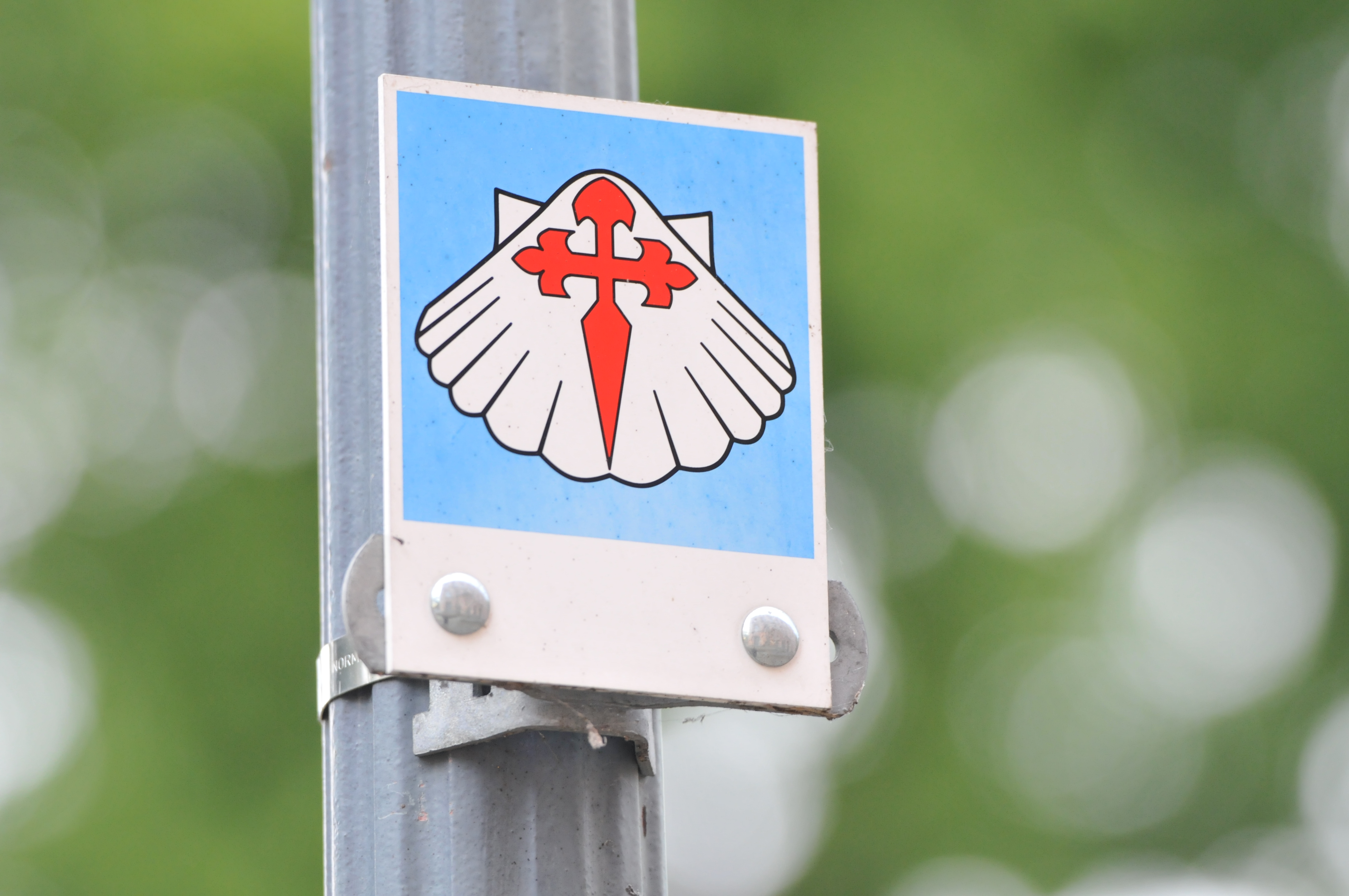
Waymark of the Way of St. James (white shell, red cross) in the city center of Zittau, Saxony, Germany.
Examples of the cross displayed throughout Spain

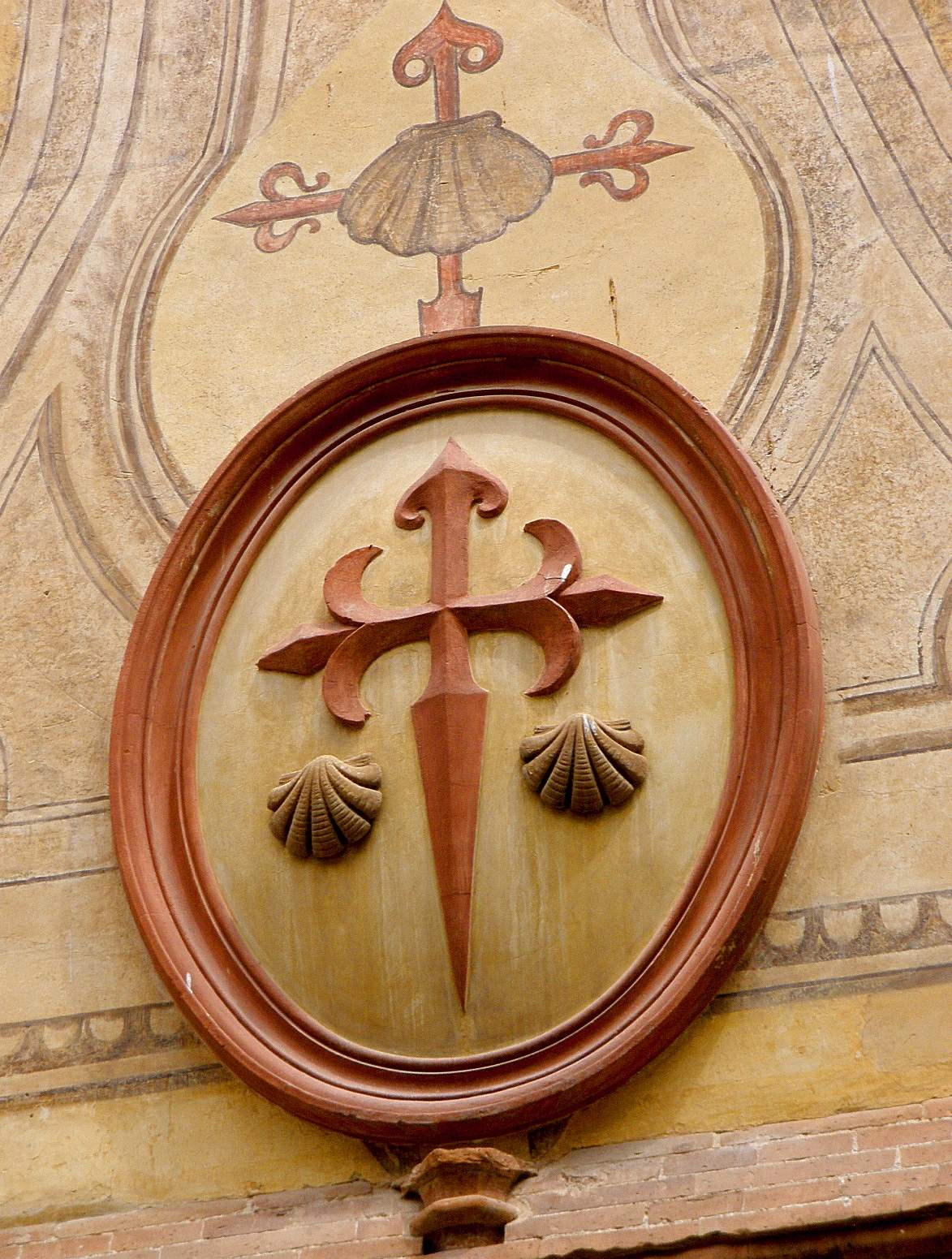
Cross on the façade of Iglesia de Santiago Apóstol, in Málaga

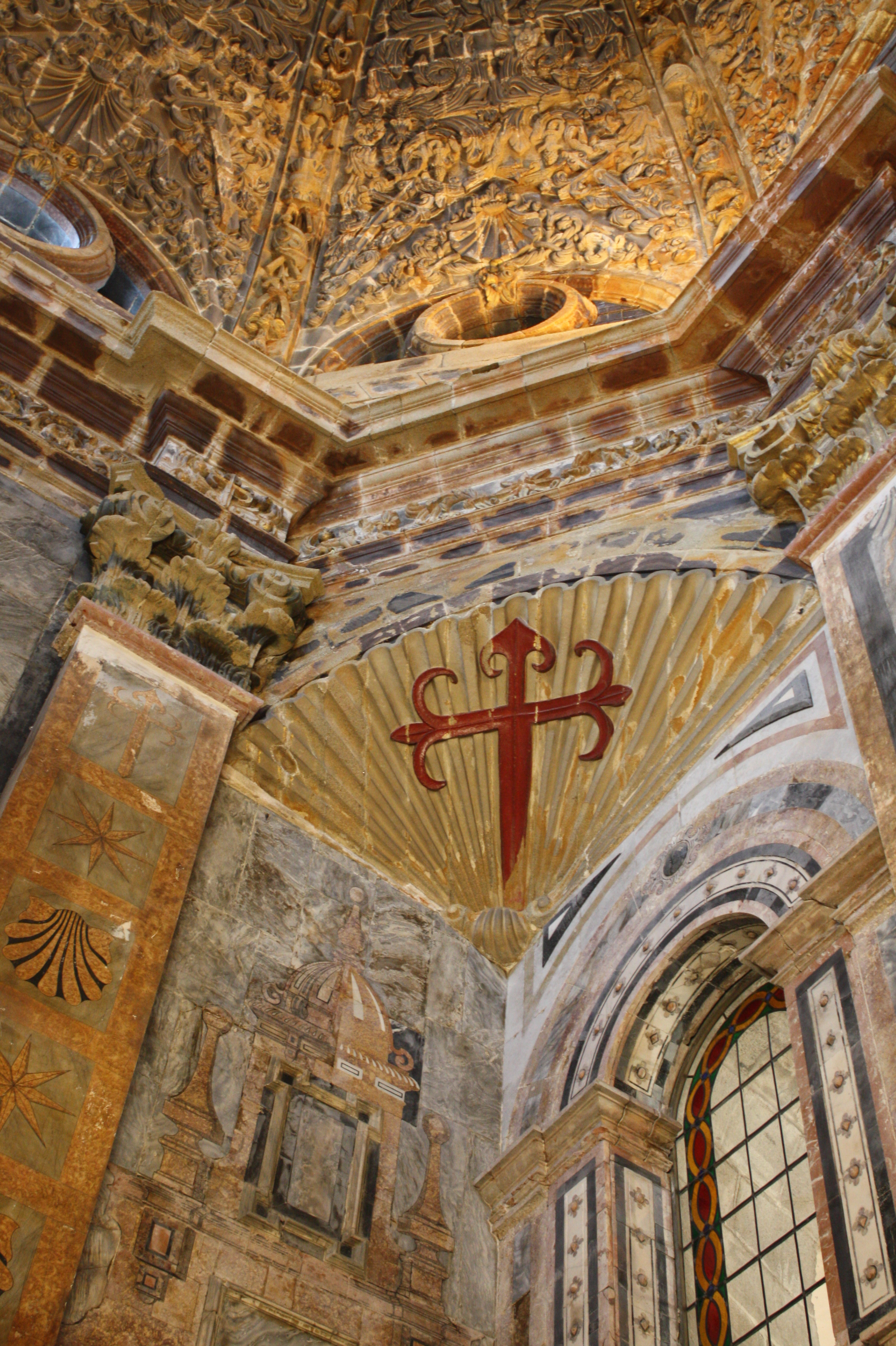
Cross on a shell, in the Cathedral of Santiago de Compostela, in Galicia

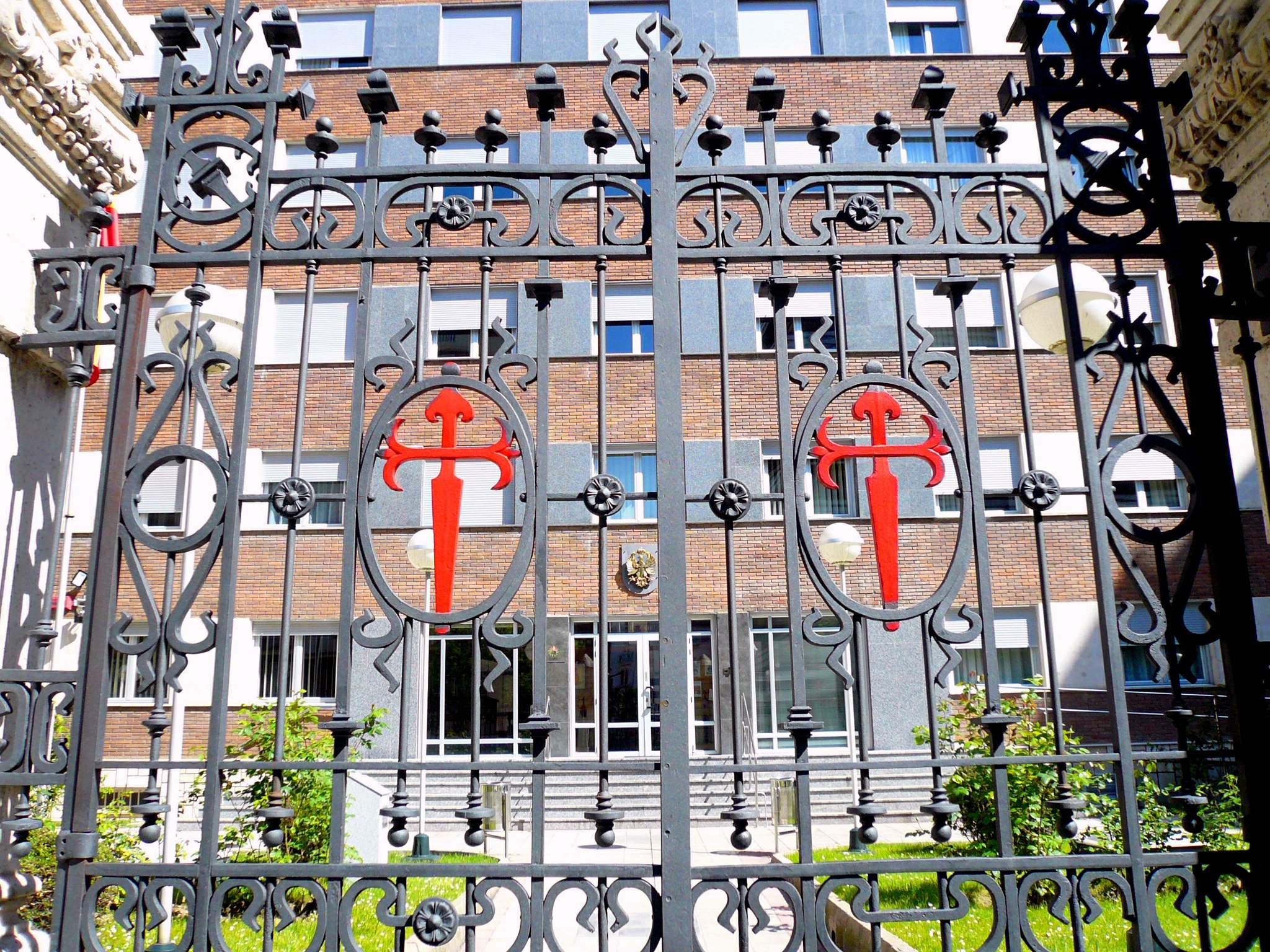
St. James Cross on the entry gates to a student residence in Valladolid

Coat of arms of La Rioja
Examples of the cross in art

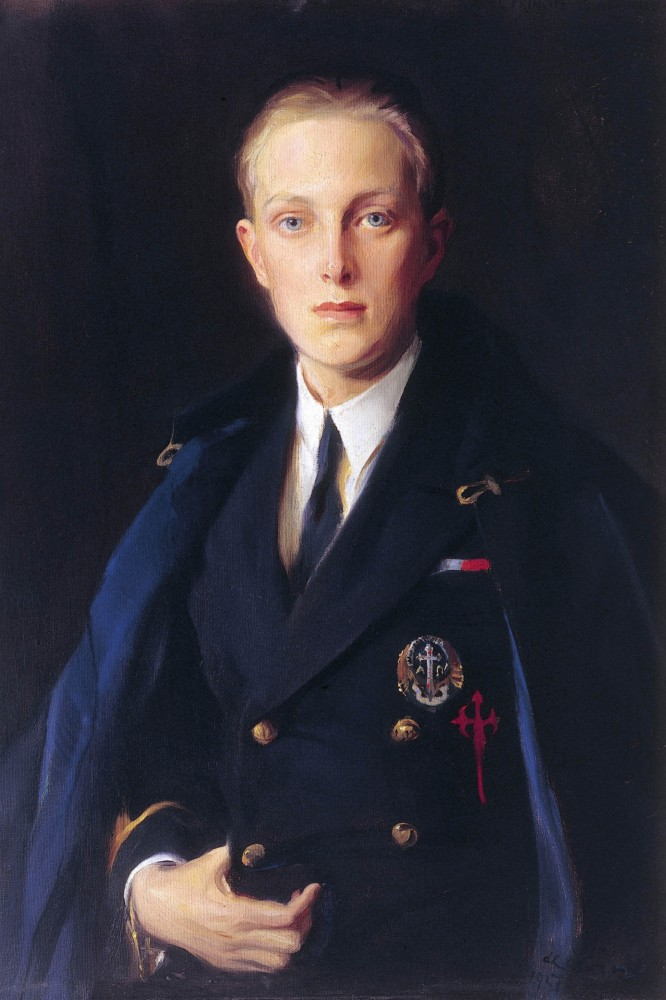
Portrait of Prince Alfonso, by Philip Alexius de László, c. 1927 with the cross embroidered on the side of his jacket

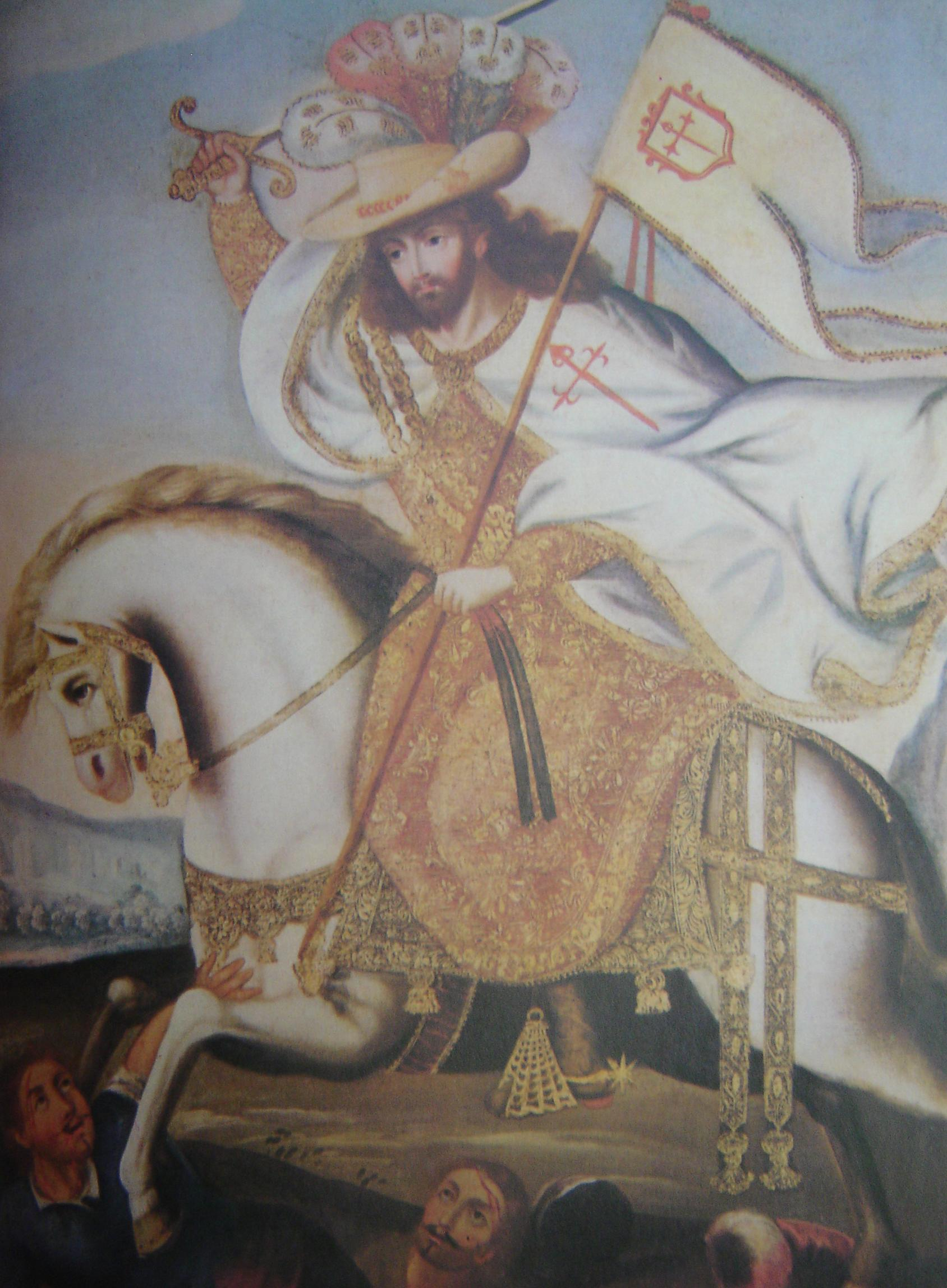
17th century painting of Saint James, wearing the habit of the Order of Santiago. Painting by unknown artist of the Cuzco School

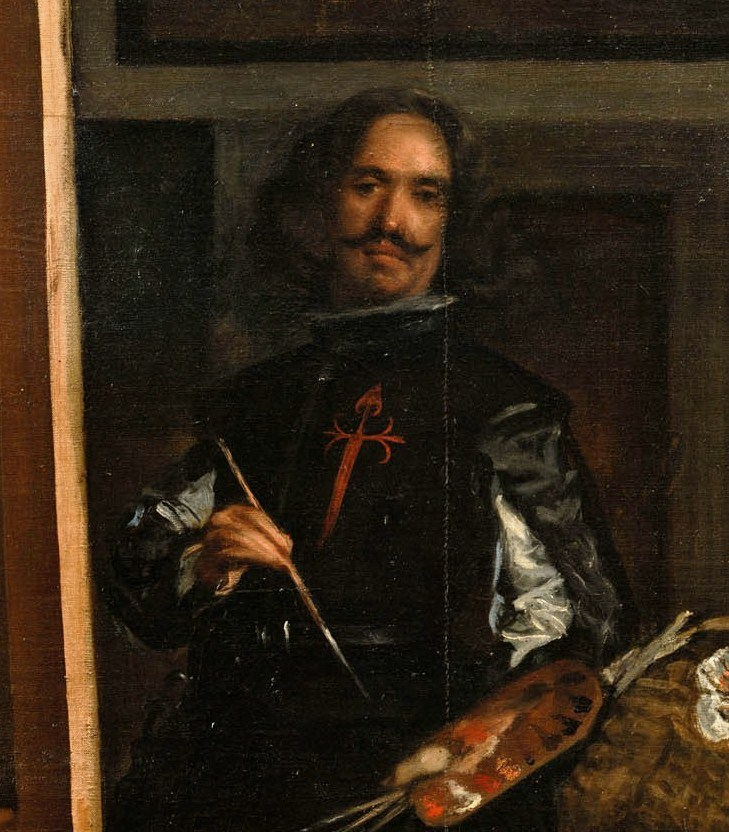
Self-portrait of Diego Velázquez; detail from Las Meninas

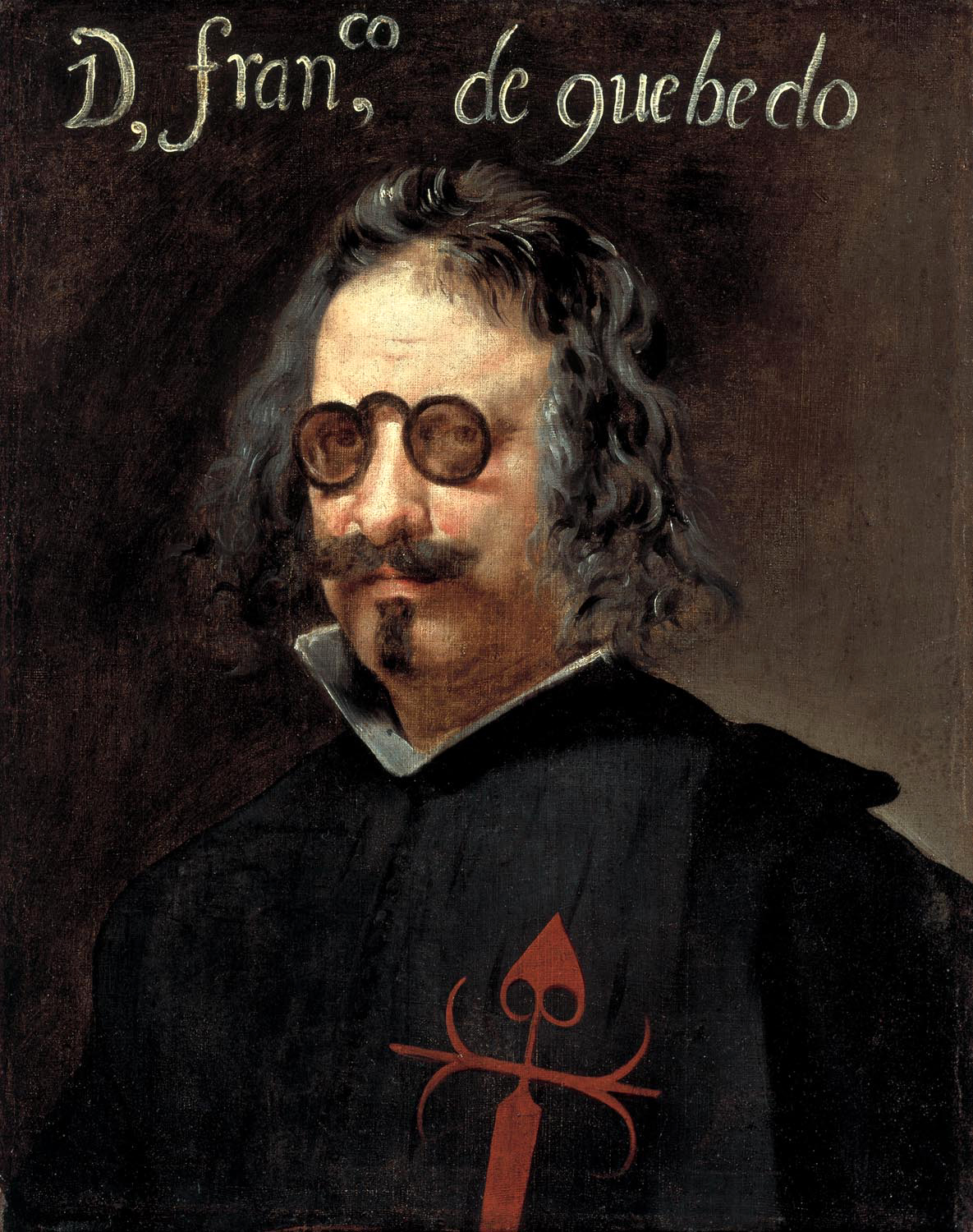
Francisco de Quevedo

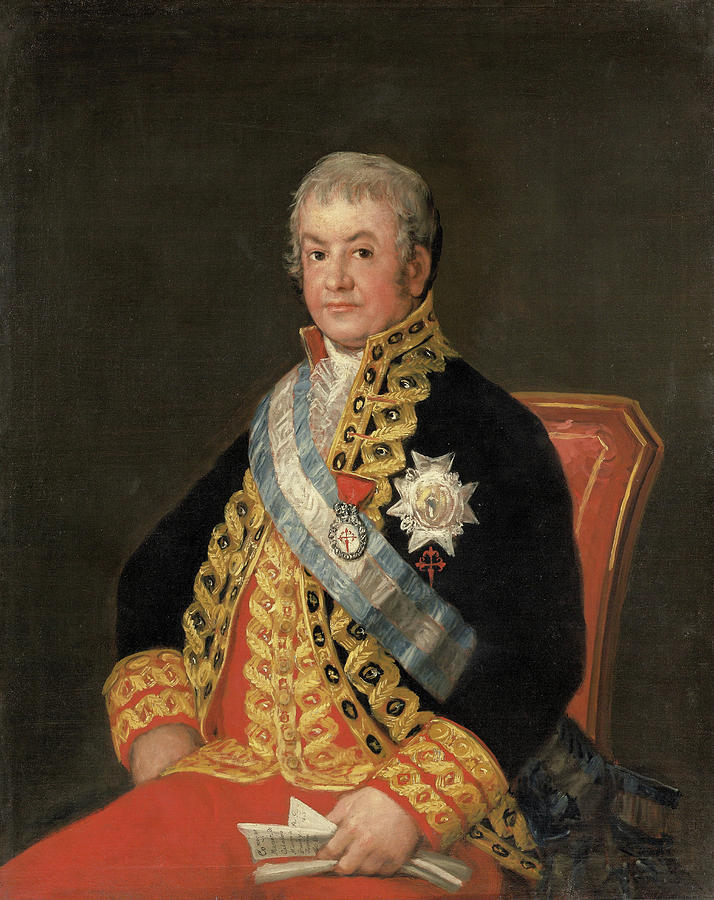
José Antonio Caballero, painted by Francisco Goya
