= Shepherd's gourd =

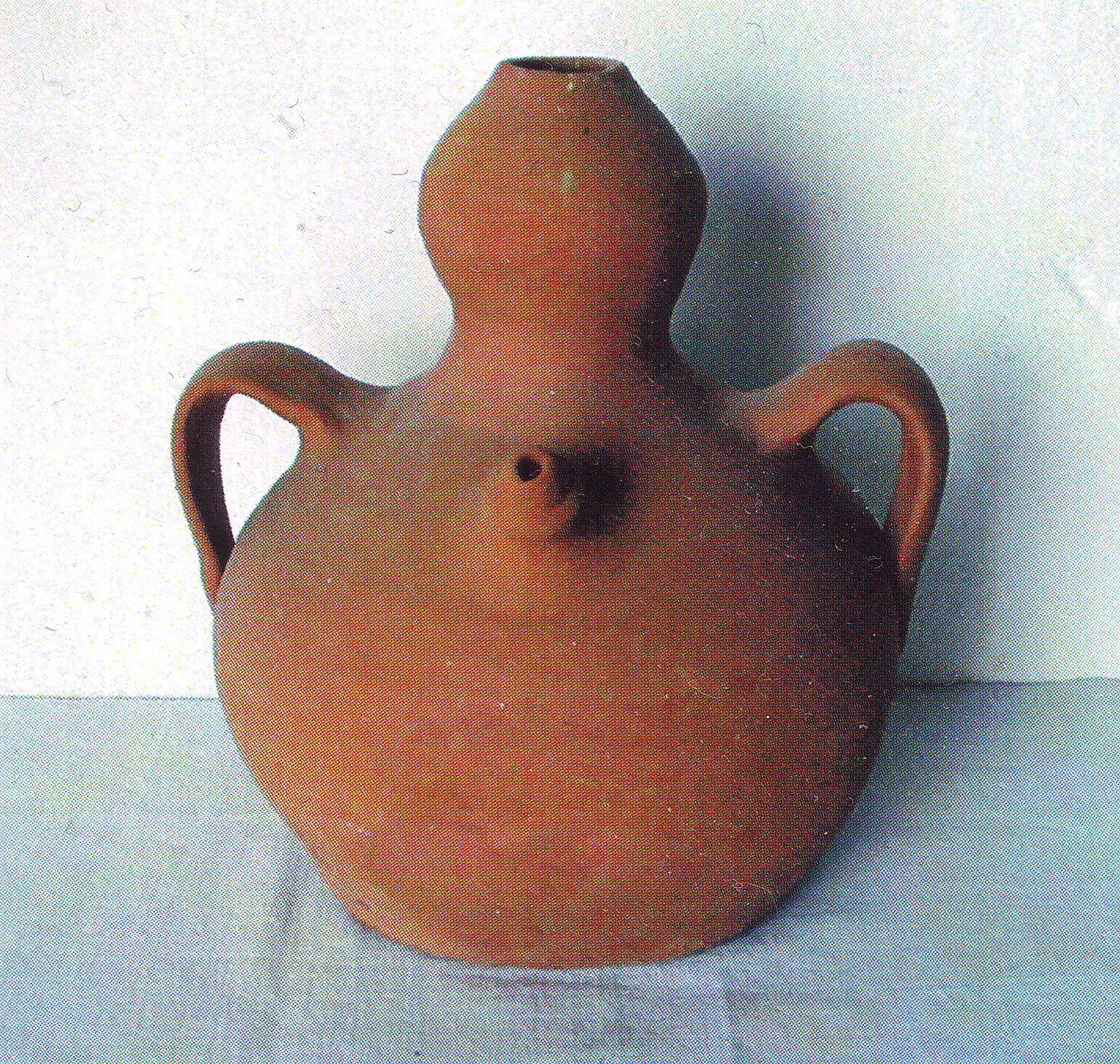
Pumpkin jar. Alfar of the Ruíz brothers (Villa de Otura, Granada, Spain). Ceramic Museum of Chinchilla de Montearagón.

A shepherd's gourd (also shepherd's jug; Spanish: botijo de pastor) is a container for carrying and holding water, which has a gourd-like body, like the ordinary botijo. It has a widened neck that, allows a rope to be tied to hold it to allow it to be carried or tied to another object. Originally it consisted of a small gourd whose interior was emptied and cured, to serve as a vessel for liquids. The shape was later copied by potters in the various shapes of vessels, such as botijillas or canteens. Together with the pilgrim's scallop, it is part of the iconography of the pilgrim in general and of the Way of Saint James.

== Background ==
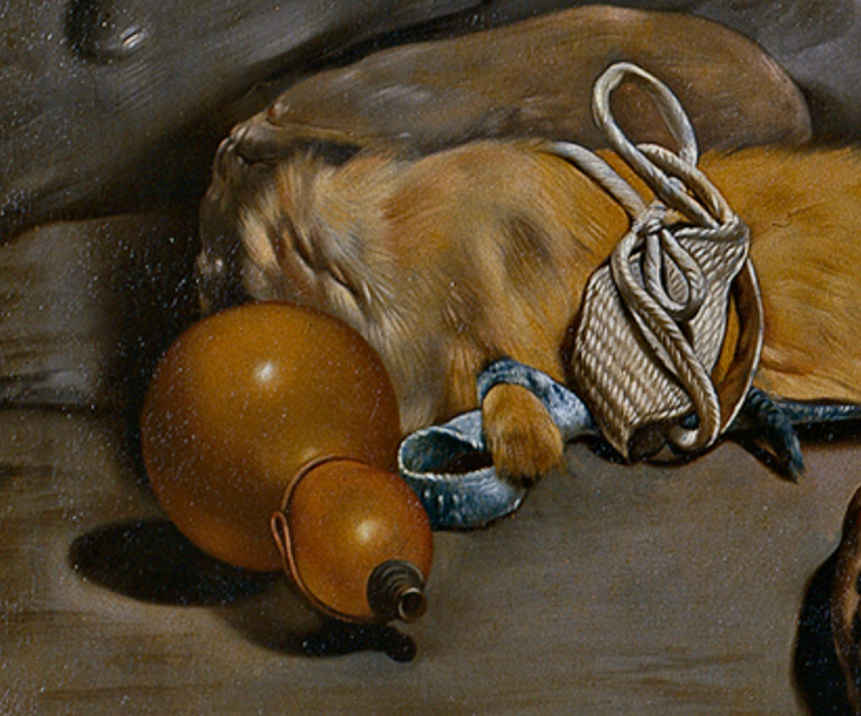
Detail in the painting by Juan Bautista Maíno: The Adoration of the Shepherds (ca. 1611-1613). Prado Museum (Madrid, Spain)

Other variants of the name are the "shepherd's jug" or "pumpkin jug" (Spanish:botija de calabaza) and the calabazo or pilgrim's barrel (Spanish:barril de peregrino). This is how Caro Bellido defines it in his Spanish lexical dictionary, citing in turn Menéndez Pidal who defined gourd as an old Castilian term used to designate a "vessel in the shape of a gourd." Jesús Lizcano, in his studies dedicated to the pottery from La Mancha, estimates that when used to carry wine or water, they had a capacity of two liters.

== History ==
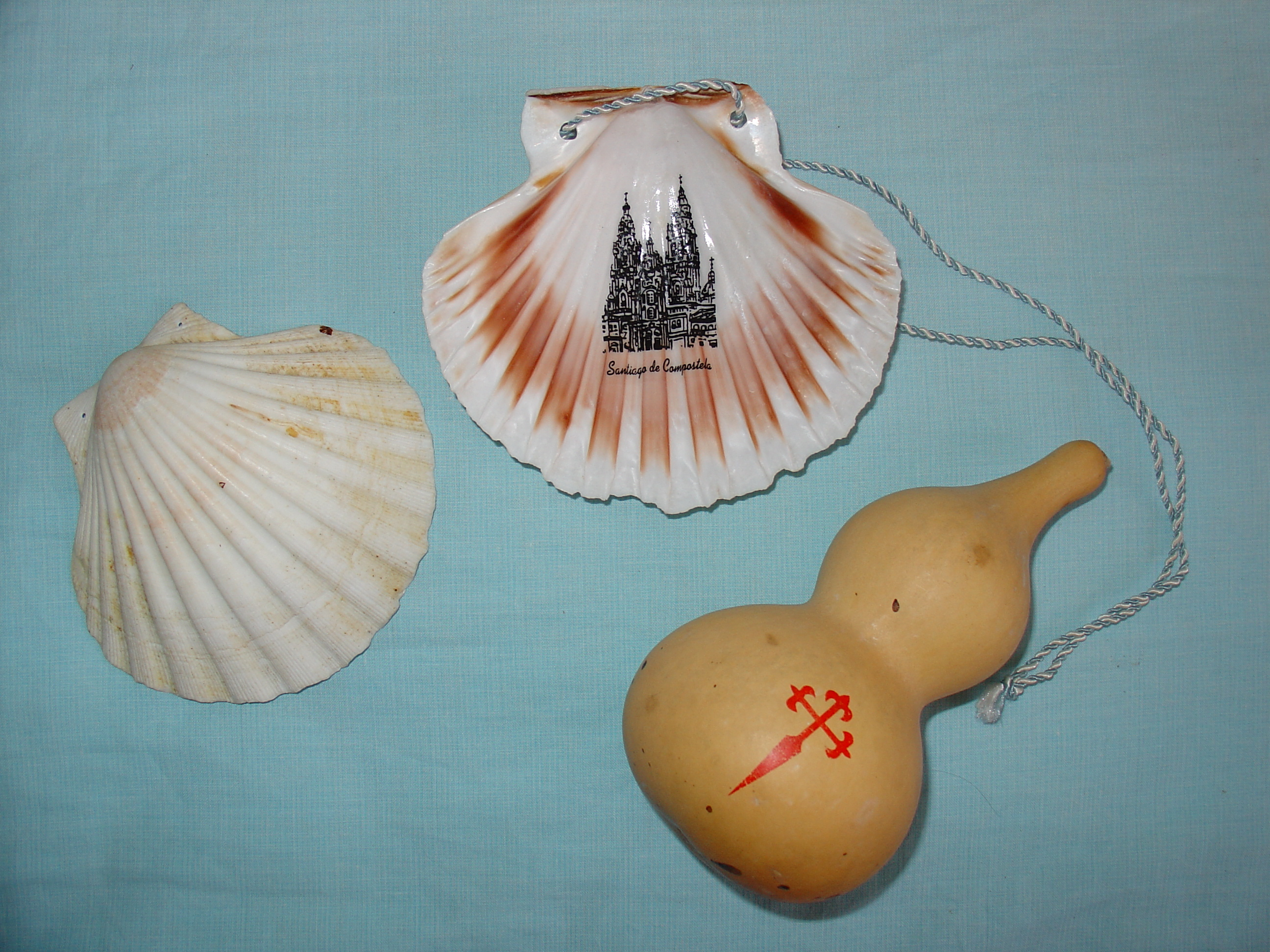
St James pilgrim accessories (Note the shepherd's gourd)

With the name of "Lagenaria siceraria" (a tropical species, relative of the cucurbits) is designated in botany to the pilgrim gourd, considered by the botanist Vernon Hilton Heywood one of the "most primitive plants cultivated by man." Already in 1968, the botanist Herbert George Baker noted that he had found specimens dated between 3500 and 3300 BC in Egyptian tombs, and also in Peruvian burials, around 3000 BC. of C., and in troglodyte cultures of Mexico with an antiquity of 7000 years a. C., Herbert himself left news of the experiments carried out by Whitaker & Carter, showing that the pumpkin could float in seawater for two years without its seeds losing their ability to germinate, thus being able to have crossed the Atlantic Ocean. However, other scholars propose that the journey of pumpkins and their seeds was through the Pacific Ocean, before the discovery of America.

Use of a gourd as a jug or canteen can be traced through different cultures both in Europe and the Americas. Gourd size varies (between 10 and 60 cm), the weight inconsistent, and its shapes varied, made this variety of gourds the chosen vessel for primitive tourists, the pilgrims.

== In art ==
There is abundant representation of the shepherd's gourd in the iconography of shepherds, pilgrims and farmers (especially the reapers at a rest break). It is also present in sculptures, bas-reliefs and friezes of European art since the 11th century.

Pilgrims

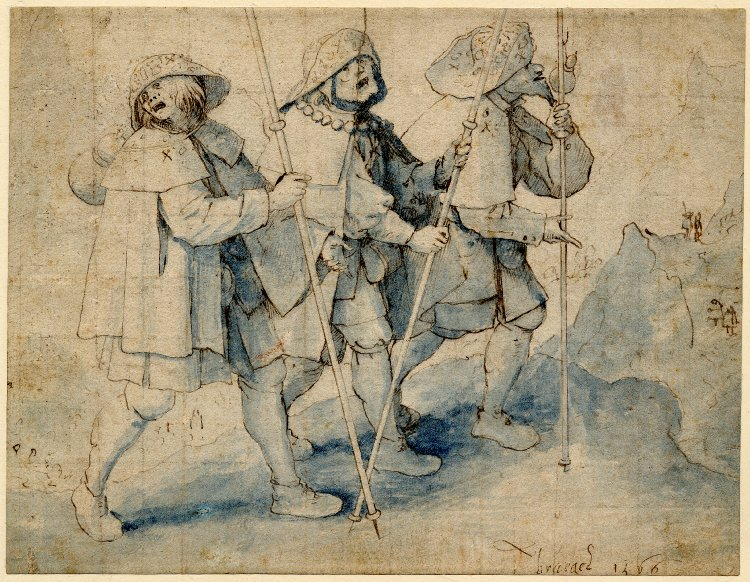
Drawing (blood and ink) by Pieter Bruegel the Elder (1566). At the top of the pilgrim's rod on the right is a gourd.

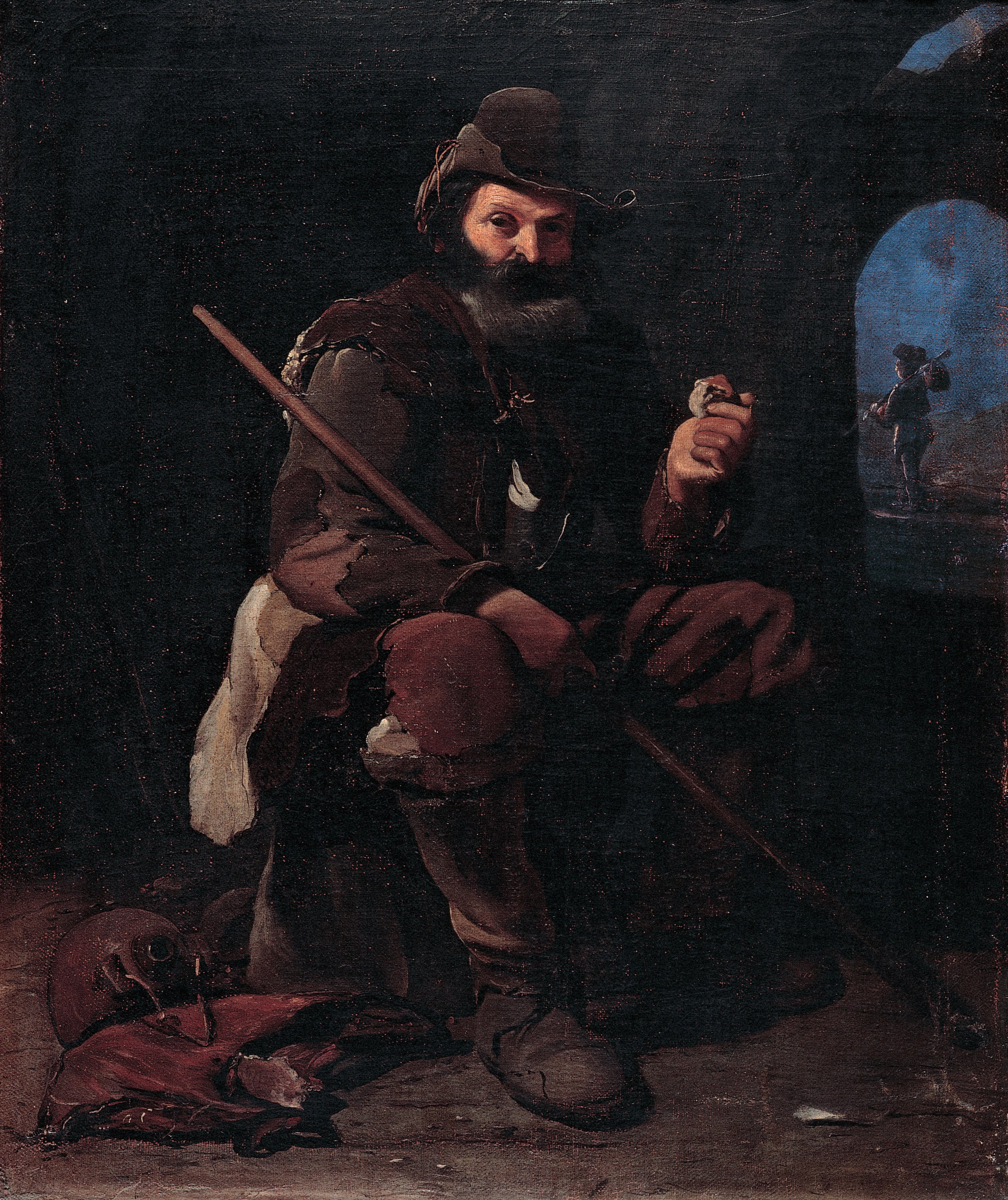
Old Pilgrim, oil painting by the Dutchman Michael Sweerts. On the floor, to the left, a shepherd's gourd (circa 1690).

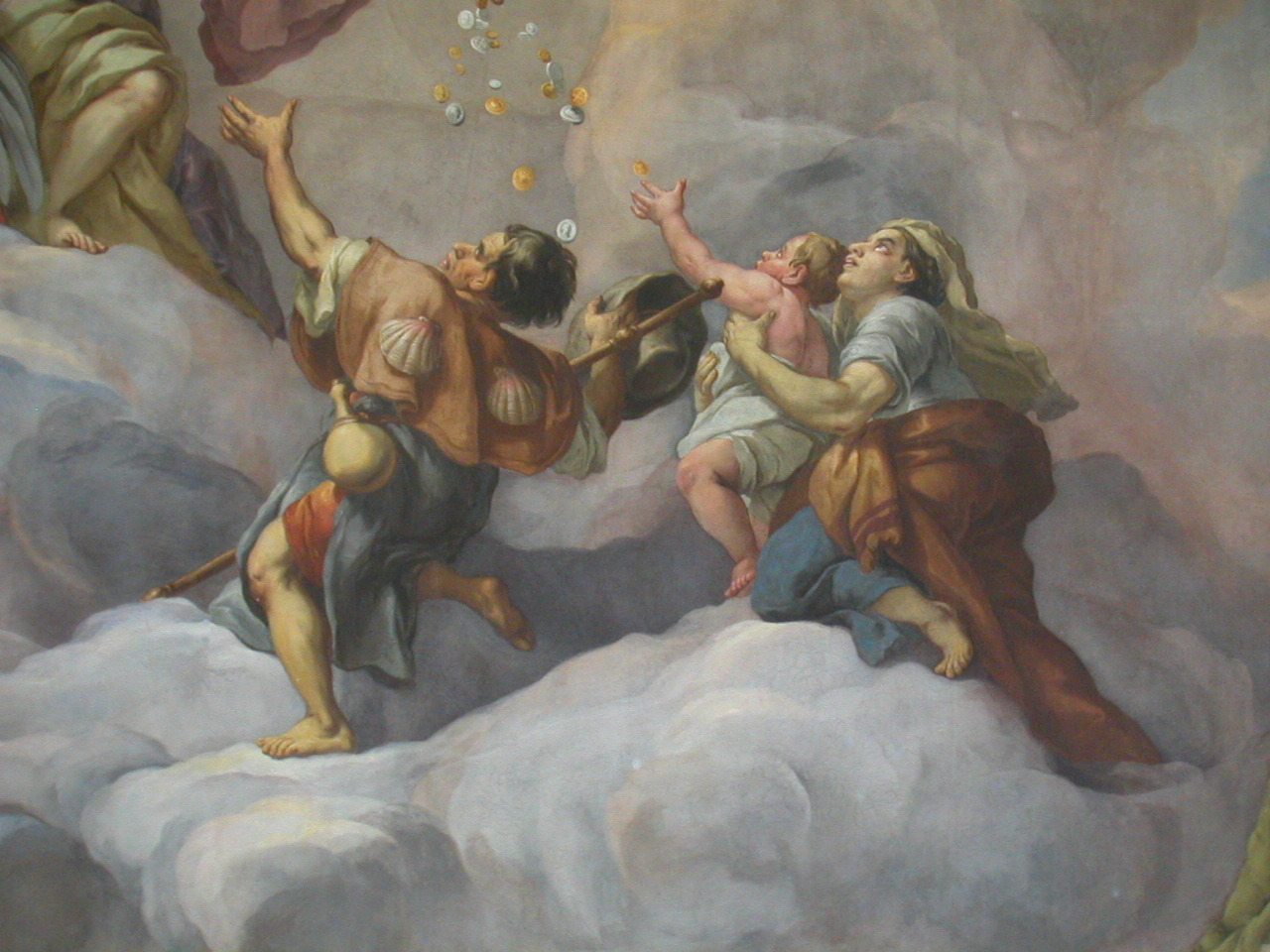
Detail of the Allegory of Love, fresco in the dome of Karl's Church, Vienna (circa 1750).

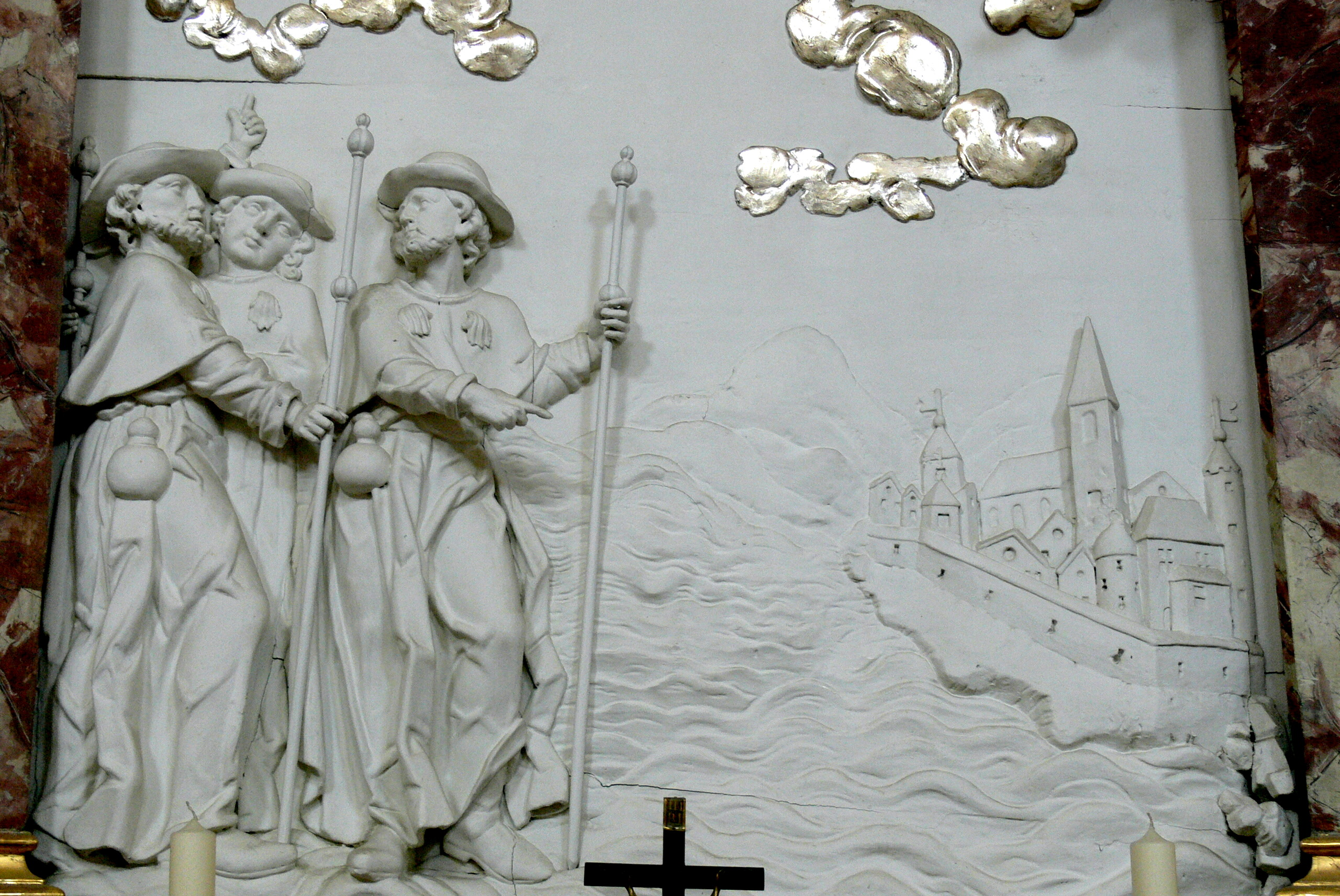
Pilgrims on the way to Gennazano (around 1800). Relief on the Altar of Our Lady of Good Counsel, in the church of St. Augustine, in Rattenberg (Tyrol).

== See also ==
- Botijo
- Alfarería de agua
- Cantarilla
- Jacobean holy year

== Bibliography ==
- Caro Bellido, Antonio [in Spanish] (2008). Diccionario de términos cerámicos y de alfarería (in Spanish). Cádiz: Agrija Ediciones. ISBN 978-84-96191-07-5.
- Álvaro Sevilla, María Angela (1999). "El uso de la calabaza de peregrino (Lagenaria sicenaria) en España". Revista de Folklore número 223 (in Spanish).
- Lizcano Tejado, Jesús María (2000). Diputación Provincial de Ciudad Real (ed.). Los barreros: alfarería en la provincia de Ciudad Real (in Spanish). ISBN 978-84-7789-166-6.
- Useros Cortés, Carmina; Belmonte Useros, Pilar (2005). Museo de cerámica nacional. Piezas de alfarería de toda España (in Spanish). Albacete, Museo de Cerámica Nacional. Chinchilla de Montearagón. ISBN 84-609-5626-1.
