= Uruguay Naval Academy =

Military academy in Montevideo, Uruguay

Coordinates: 34.8829°S 56.0404°W

- Escuela Naval de Uruguay
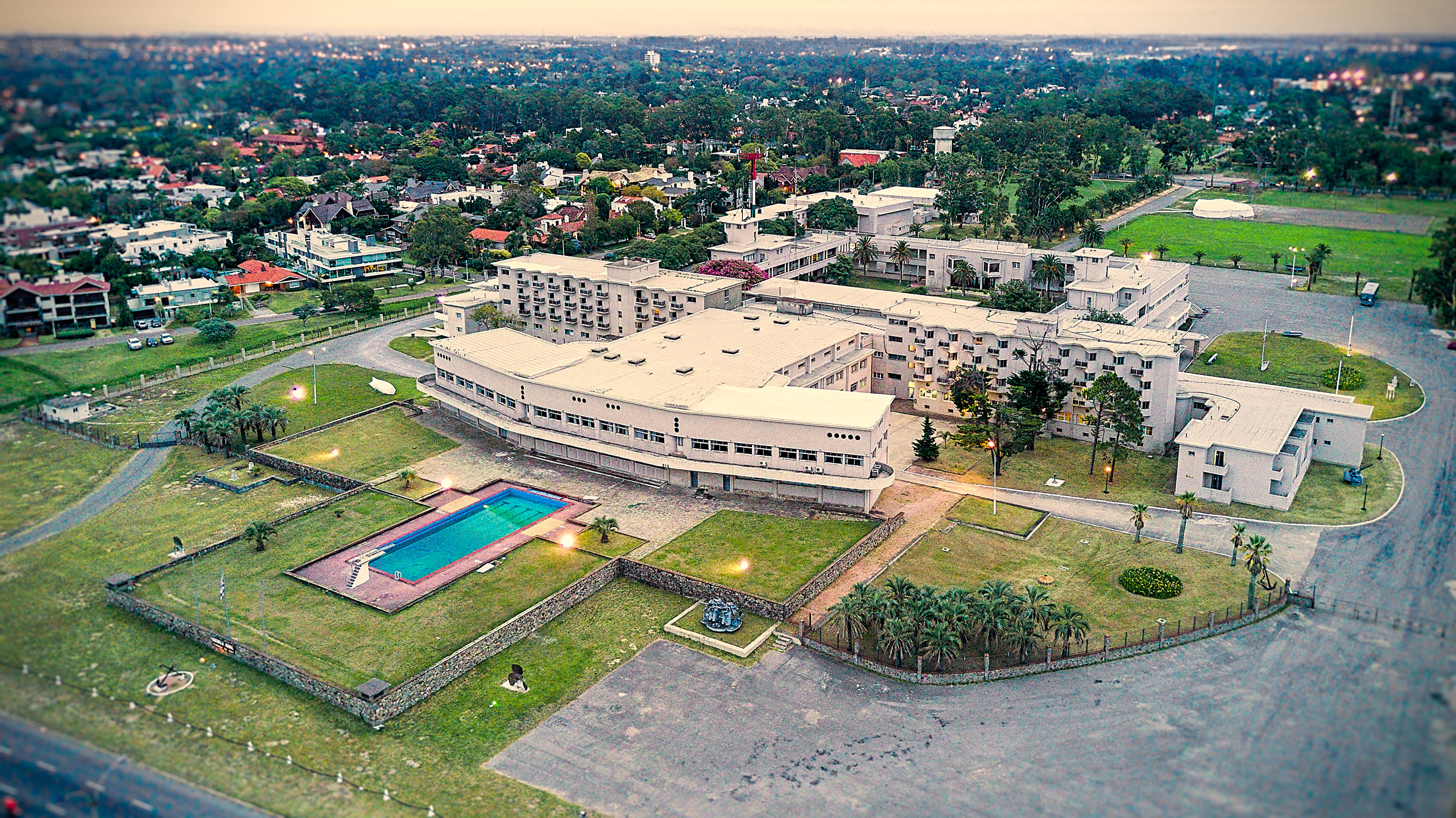
- Motto: Ser marino: más que una profesión, un desafío "Being a marine: more than a profession, a challenge."
- Type: Public, secular, mixed, military
- Established: 12 December 1907
- Principal: Pablo Quezada
- Location: Montevideo, Uruguay
- Website: www.escuelanaval.edu.uy

The Uruguay Naval Academy (ESNAL) (Spanish: Escuela Naval de Uruguay) is the service academy that trains officers for commissioning primarily into the Uruguayan National Navy. It is located in the Carrasco neighborhood of Montevideo.

Initially, Navy officers trained at the Military School (dependent on the National Army of Uruguay) until December 12, 1907, the Naval Academy was founded.

It is the only institute in the country that grants the title of Officer of the National Navy or Merchant Navy, graduating as Midshipmen and as Second Officers for each career, respectively; Training and certification courses are also held for seafarers, according to the regulations of the International Maritime Organization (IMO). In the Naval Academy, fifth and sixth secondary education, the Naval Baccalaureate, can be taken as undergraduate education.

== Education system ==
=== Secondary education ===
The "Bachillerato Naval" (Liceo No. 98 in Montevideo), offers the option of pursuing two years of specialization (2nd and 3rd Year of Baccalaureate) into Humanities or Science.

=== Military education and training ===
==== Officer of the National Navy ====
The curriculum consists of four years in boarding school, being able to choose to specialize in the General Corps, the Coast Guard Corps or the Machine and Electricity Engineer Corps. The Officers who approve a thesis obtain the title of Bachelor of Naval Systems.

==== Merchant Marine Officer ====
The curriculum consists of four years in an external regime, having the option of specializing as a Merchant Pilot or Merchant Engineer. Graduates who pass a thesis obtain the Bachelor of Nautical Systems.
