= Flag of Los Lagos =

Chilean regional flag

Los Lagos
- Use: Civil and state flag, civil ensign
- Proportion: 2:3
- Adopted: October 23, 2013; 13 years ago

The Flag of Los Lagos Region is one of the regional symbols of the Chilean Los Lagos Region. The flag was adopted in 2013 by the Regional Government.

The flag consists of a horizontal bicolour of green and blue, with four stars resembling the shape of the Southern Cross in the canton. The stars represent the four provinces of the Los Lagos Region (Osorno, Llanquihue, Chiloé and Palena).

== History ==
Old unofficial flag

Until 2013, the region did not have an official flag; the regional flag was generally considered to be the flag displayed in the meeting hall of the National Congress of Chile, which consisted of the emblem of the regional government of Los Lagos on a blue field.

In 2012, a proposal was presented to the Regional Council to modify the Regional Government logo and define a new regional flag. The proposal included using the colors of the sea and land of the Los Lagos region and including four stars representing the region's four provinces. The addition of the number "30," representing the region's thirty municipalities, was also proposed, but this proposal was ultimately rejected. On 23 October 2013, the Regional Council approved the design for the regional flag at its 20th regular session.
