= List of Ecuadorian flags =

Flags of Ecuador

This is a list of flags used in or otherwise associated with Ecuador.

== National flag ==
Flag	Date	Use	Description
	1860–present	Flag of Ecuador	A horizontal tricolor of yellow (double width), blue, and red with the national coat of arms superimposed at the center.
	1860–present	Civil flag of Ecuador	A horizontal tricolor of yellow (double width), blue, and red.

== President flags ==
Flag	Date	Use	Description
		Presidential standard	

== Military flags ==
Flag	Date	Use	Description
		Flag of Ecuadorian Army	
		Naval jack	

== Municipal flags ==
Flag	Date	Use	Description
		Flag used by municipal buildings	

== Organization flags ==
Flag	Date	Use	Description
		Flag of the Confederation of Indigenous Nationalities of Ecuador	
		Flag of the National Assembly of Ecuador	

== Political flags ==
Flag	Date	Use	Description
	2005–?	Flag of the Ecuadorian National Garcian Phalanx	Blue-red-blue vertical triband, with a yoke and arrows on red field.

== Provincial flags ==
Flag	Province	Adopted	Description
	Azuay		
	Bolívar		
	Cañar		
	Carchi		
	Chimborazo		
	Cotopaxi		
	El Oro		
	Esmeraldas		
	Galápagos		
	Guayas		
	Imbabura		
	Loja		
	Los Ríos		
	Manabí		
	Morona-Santiago		
	Napo		
	Orellana		
	Pastaza		
	Pichincha		
	Santo Domingo de los Tsáchilas		
	Santa Elena		
	Sucumbíos		
	Tungurahua		
	Zamora-Chinchipe		

== Historical flags ==
Flag	Date	Description
	1534–1820	The Cross of Burgundy flag of the Spanish colonial empire flew over Ecuador for many years.
	1809–1812	The leaders of a rebellion against the Spanish authorities raised a reversed Cross of Burgundy flag in Quito on 10 August 1809. The uprising was defeated in 1812.
	1820–1822	A flag with five horizontal stripes of blue and white and three stars in the middle stripe. This flag subsequently became that of the Guayas Province, and was first raised by the patriots in the liberation of 9 October 1820.
	1822	The previous flag was changed by decree of 2 June 1822: "The flag of the free province of Guayaquil shall be white and its first quarter blue with a centered star."
	1822–1830	Ecuador was subsumed into Gran Colombia, during which time the Colombian horizontal tricolour became definitive. Although Ecuador seceded from that union in 1830, the flag was retained until 1845.
	1830–1835	Provisional flag of the State of Ecuador, decreed on 19 November 1830.
	1835–1845	First flag used officially by Ecuador after its separation from Gran Colombia.
	1845	During the 1845 Marcist Revolution the pale blue and white colours return, but as a vertical tricolour of white, blue, white, with three white stars in the central stripe.
	1845–1860	The Cuenca Convention ratified, by decree of 6 November 1845, a change to a deeper blue, and the increase in the number of stars to seven "as symbols of the seven provinces which make up the Republic".
	1860–1900	Gabriel García Moreno, upon assuming power two days after the Battle of Guayaquil, reinstated the tricolor flag of Greater Colombia on 26 September 1860. In 1900, the flag was made the definitive national standard, and the coat of arms was added for official state use. The plain flag was established as the merchant ensign in 1900.
	1900–2009	The flag from 31 October 1900. In 1900, the flag was made the definitive national standard, and the coat of arms was added for official state use. The plain flag was established as the merchant ensign in 1900 a modification in November 2009.

== Burgees ==
Flag	Club
	Salinas Yacht Club

== See also ==
- Flag of Ecuador
- Coat of arms of Ecuador
