= Cundinamarca flags =

Flag of Cundinamarca Department

This is a gallery of flags of municipalities in Cundinamarca in Colombia.

== Cundinamarca ==
=== Almeidas ===
CHOCONTA

MACHETA

SESQUILE

SUESCA

TIBIRITA

VILLAPINZON

=== Central Sabana ===
CAJICA

CHIA

COGUA

TABIO

TENJO

ZIPAQUIRA

=== Eastern ===
CAQUEZA

UNE

=== Gualiva ===
UTICA

=== Guavio ===
GACHALA

GACHETA

LA CALERA

=== Lower Magdalena ===
CAPARRAPI

GUADUAS

PUERTO SALGAR

=== Soacha ===
SOACHA

=== Sumapaz ===
ARBELAEZ

FUSAGASUGA

PASCA

SAN BERNARDO

VENECIA

=== Tequendama ===
ANOLAIMA

=== Upper Magdalena ===
AGUA DE DIOS

GIRARDOT

GUATAQUI

JERUSALEN

NARIÑO

NILO

RICAURTE

TOCAIMA

=== Western Sabana ===
FACATATIVA

FUNZA

MADRID
