= Coat of arms of Argentina =

- Armiger: Argentine Republic
- Adopted: 1944 (1813)
- Crest: A Sun of May or
- Shield: Party per fess azure and argent, in base two arms throughout fessways, the hands shaking and holding a pike paleways proper ensigned on the top with a Phrygian cap gules.
- Other elements: Around the shield two sprigs of laurel vert tied together in base by a ribbon azure charged with a fess argent

The coat of arms of the Argentine Republic or Argentine shield (Spanish: Escudo de la República Argentina) was established in its current form in 1944 but has its origins in the seal of the General Constituent Assembly of 1813. It is supposed that it was chosen quickly because of the existence of a decree signed on February 22 sealed with the symbol. The first mention of it in a public document dates to March 12 of that same year, in which it is stated that the seal had to be used by the executive power, that is, the second triumvirate. On April 13 the National Assembly coined the new silver and gold coins, each with the seal of the assembly on the reverse, and on April 27 the coat of arms became a national emblem. Although the coat of arms is not currently shown on flags, the Buenos Aires-born military leader Manuel Belgrano ordered to paint it over the flag he gave to the city of San Salvador de Jujuy, and during the Argentine War of Independence most flags had the coat of arms.

== Description ==
Seal of the General Constituent Assembly of 1813.

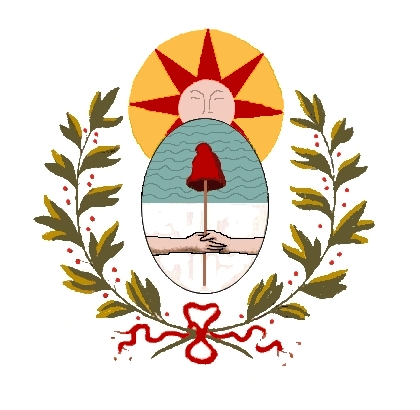
Seal of a French group in the National Assembly, around 1793.

It is unknown who designed the coat of arms. It is often mentioned that there were three men involved: Alvear, Monteagudo, and Vieytes, but it is known that a few years before, President Bernardino Rivadavia asked the Peruvian Antonio Isidoro Castro to create an Argentine coat of arms; these two schemes have never been found.

The coat of arms is a figure, in which at the top we find the gold-yellowed Sun of May, also found on the flag of Argentina. The rising sun symbolizes the rising of Argentina, as described in the first version of the Argentine National Anthem, se levanta a la faz de la tierra una nueva y gloriosa nación, meaning "a new and glorious nation rises to the surface of the Earth". It must be noticed how the verb "rise", in English and Spanish can be used to describe the motion of the Sun.

In the center ellipse there are two shaking hands, connoting the unity of the provinces of Argentina. The hands come together to hold a pike, which represents power and willingness to defend freedom, epitomized by the Phrygian cap on the top of the spear.

Enlarged version of the coat of arms of Argentina, with flags on each side, year 1863

The blue and white colors are symbols of the Argentine people and the same colors of the Argentine flag. Those derive from those utilised in the cockade promoting liberation from Spain, in the May Revolution in 1810, which in turn came about from the colours of the Borbonic dynasty.

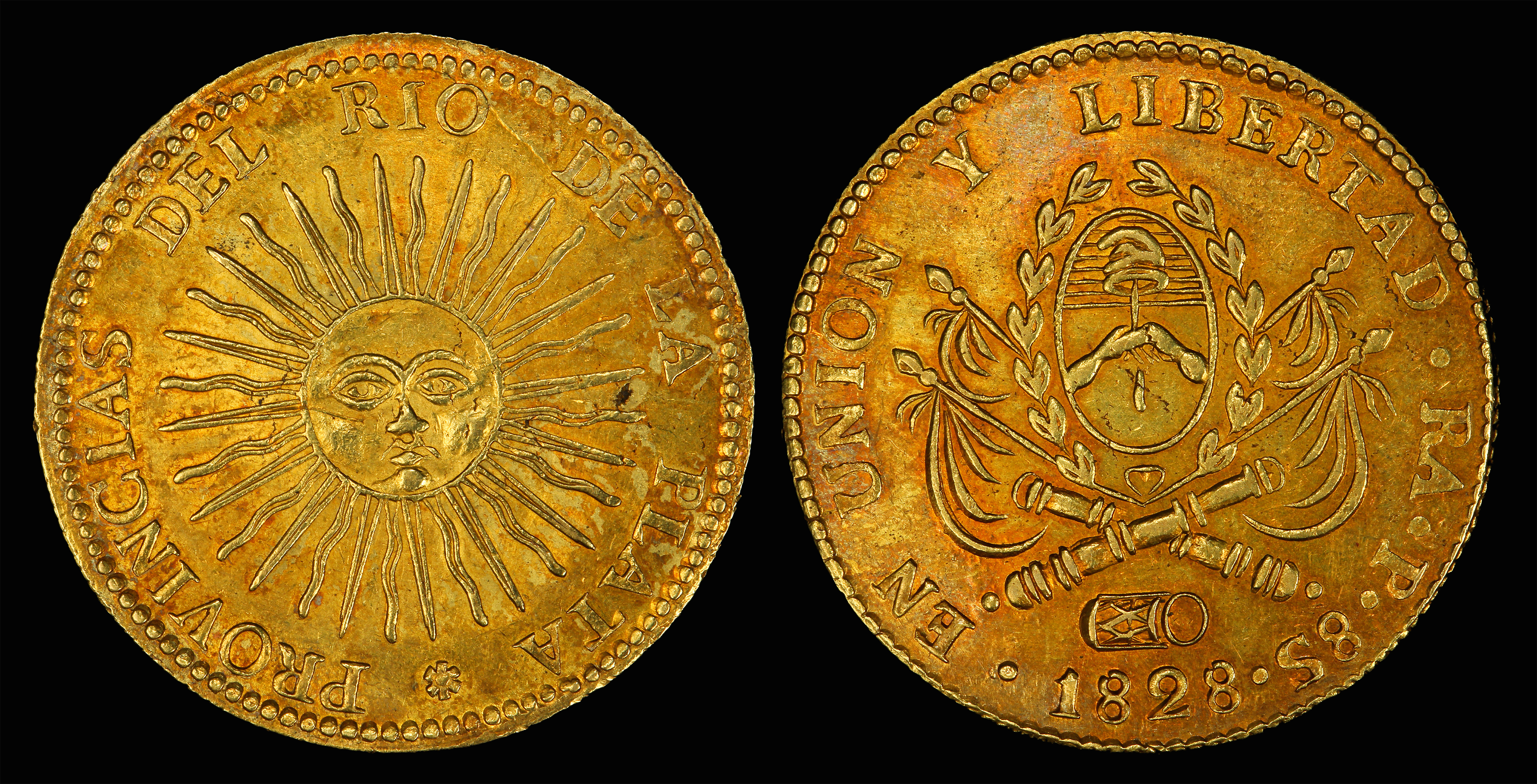
Coat of Arms of the General Constituent Assembly of Argentina depicted on the eight escudo gold coin.

The hands stand for friendship, peace, unity, and brotherhood. The pike is brown (wooden), and the Phrygian cap is red, like the traditional French Revolution era liberty cap. The proximity of the hands and the Phrygian cap, in addition to their individual meanings, represent the national motto of Argentina, en unión y libertad ("in unity and freedom"), and illustrate the idea that in unity (the hands) there is power (the pike), and in power there is freedom (the Phrygian cap).

The Phrygian cap was typically worn by the inhabitants of Phrygia, in the Anatolian peninsula, and is commonly mistaken for being a Pileus. The Pileus was a hat that in ancient Rome became a symbol of freed slaves, who were touched by their owners with a wooden pike before setting them free. Laurel is another classical symbol. At the end of the ancient Olympic Games (and also the 2004 Summer Olympics), the winner was given a laurel crown, and since then it has symbolized triumph and glory.

== Provincial shields ==
Argentina's provincial shields
City of Buenos Aires	Buenos Aires Province	Catamarca	Córdoba
Corrientes	Chaco	Chubut	Entre Ríos
Formosa	Jujuy	La Pampa	La Rioja
Mendoza	Misiones	Neuquén	Río Negro
Salta	San Juan	San Luis	Santa Cruz
Santa Fe	Santiago del Estero	Tierra del Fuego	Tucumán

== See also ==
- Coat of arms of Buenos Aires Province
