= Coat of arms of Buenos Aires =

The Coat of Arms of the Autonomous City of Buenos Aires
- Current coat of arms of the city of Buenos Aires (adopted by decree in 2012)
- Armiger: City of Buenos Aires
- Adopted: 1649

The coat of arms of Buenos Aires is the official shield used by the different areas and dependencies of the Government of the city of Buenos Aires, Argentina.

The current coat of arms was adopted by law number 4408, sanctioned by the Buenos Aires City Legislature in 2012.

== History ==
On October 20, 1580 the government of the city of La Trinidad and the port of Buen Ayre, headed by Juan de Garay, received an insignia sent to it by the crown for their approval. It depicted an eagle which was unfortunately looking to the left (the right of the observer), which in heraldry suggests "illegitimacy". There was another error, in that the crown was royal (which is supposed to be reserved for the highest nobility). Perhaps because of the presumed distaste of heraldry experts, the insignia was not approved until September 20, 1596, and fell out of use quite quickly.

On November 29, 2012, the Buenos Aires City Legislature passed a bill that modified and restored the original format of the insignia. The new symbol is a refined version of the coat of arms approved on July 7, 1856 by the City Council of Buenos Aires which received final approval by Order of December 3, 1923. It is an oval with the image of the Río de la Plata, two ships symbolizing the two foundations of the City, and a white dove with its wings spread over the sky symbolizing the Holy Spirit.

== Gallery ==
Seal of Juan de Garay, de facto coat of arms of the city after the second foundation of Buenos Aires.

First true coat of arms of the city, created in 1649 and officially promulgated in 1923.

Coat of arms from 2003 to 2006.

1970 design of the municipal seal of the City of Buenos Aires 1970

Seal of the city of Buenos Aires from 1997 to 2008. The seal is derivative institutional symbol from the coat of arms.

Official seal of City of Buenos Aires from 2008 to 2012.

== See also ==
- Coat of arms of Buenos Aires Province
