= Phrygian cap =

Soft conical cap with the top pulled forward

Dacian prisoner with Phrygian cap, Roman statue from the 2nd century

The Phrygian cap (/ˈfrɪdʒ(i)ən/), also known as Thracian cap and liberty cap, is a soft conical cap with the apex bent over, associated in antiquity with several peoples in Eastern Europe, Anatolia, and Asia. The Phrygian cap was worn by Thracians, Dacians, Medes, Scythians, Sakas, Trojans and Phrygians after whom it is named. The oldest known depiction of the Phrygian cap is from Persepolis in Iran.

Although Phrygian caps did not originally function as liberty caps, they came to signify freedom and the pursuit of liberty first in the American Revolution and then in the French Revolution, particularly as a symbol of Jacobinism (in which context it has been also called a Jacobin cap). The original cap of liberty was the Roman pileus, the felt cap of emancipated slaves of ancient Rome, which was an attribute of Libertas, the Roman goddess of liberty. In the 16th century, the Roman iconography of liberty was revived in emblem books and numismatic handbooks where the figure of Libertas is usually depicted with a pileus. The most extensive use of this headgear as a modern symbol of freedom in the first two centuries after the revival of Roman iconography occurred in the Netherlands, where it became a popular headdress. In the 18th century, the traditional liberty cap was widely used in English prints, and from 1789 also in French prints; by the early 1790s, it was regularly used in the Phrygian form.

It was adopted in place of a crown on the coats of arms of the Argentina, Cuba, and Nicaragua republics as a symbol of their struggle for liberation and independence. It thus came to be identified as a symbol of republican government. A number of national personifications, including France's Marianne and the United States' Columbia are commonly depicted wearing the Phrygian cap.

== In antiquity ==
=== In the Iranian world ===
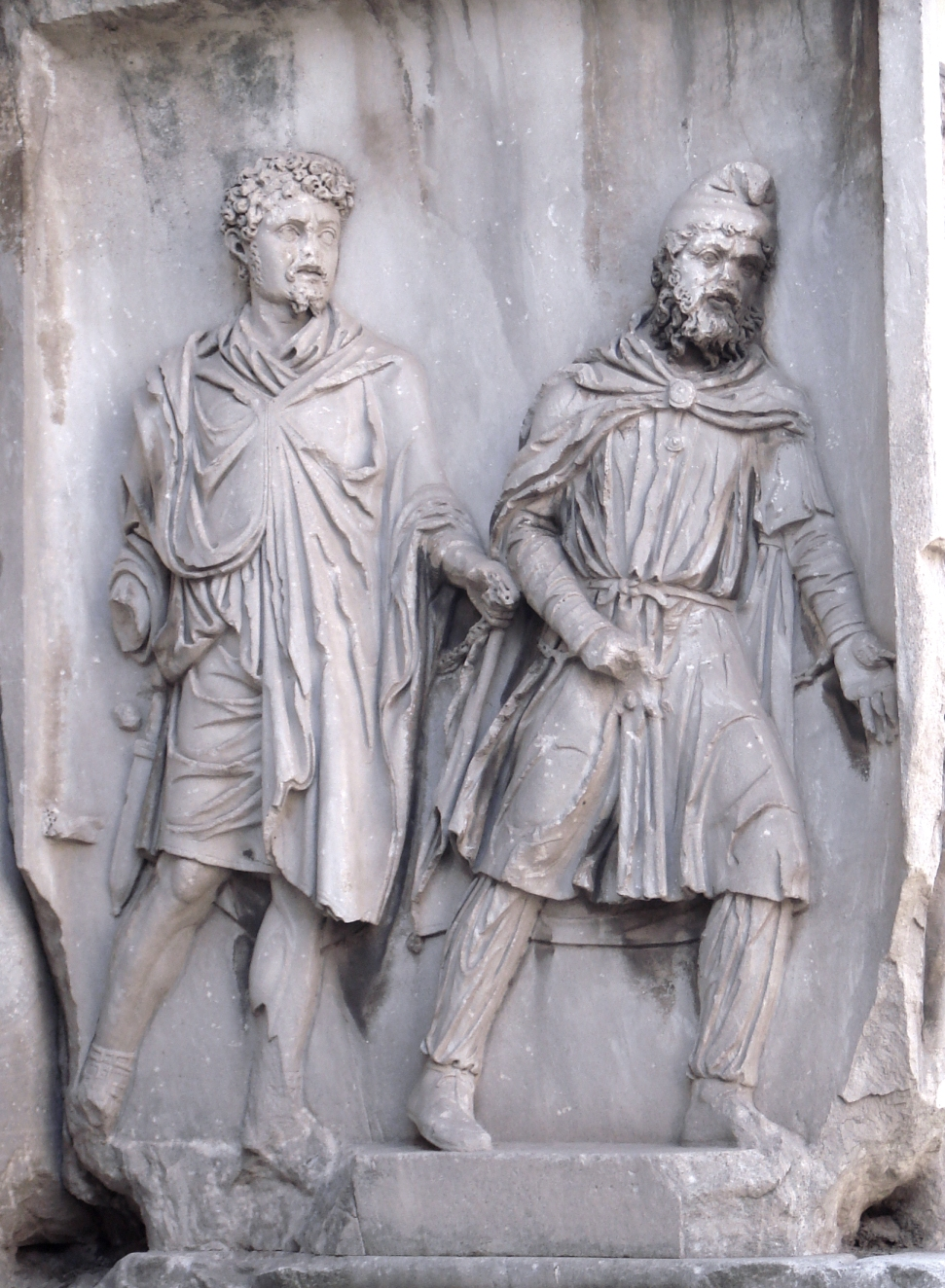
A Parthian (right) wearing a Phrygian cap, 203 AD

What came to be labelled as the Phrygian cap was originally used by several Iranian peoples, including the Medes, the Scythians of arsacid empire and Sakas. From the reports of the ancient Greeks, it appears that the Iranian variant also was a soft headdress and called a tiara.

The Greeks identified one variant with their eastern neighbors and labeled it the "Phrygian cap", although it was actually worn by nearly all Iranian tribes, from the Cappadocians (Old Persian Katpatuka) in the west to the Sakas (OPers. Sakā) in the northeast. This and other variants can be observed in the reliefs at Persepolis. All seem to have been made of soft material with long flaps over the ears and the neck, but the form of the top varies. The famous "upright (orthē) tiara" was worn by the king. Members of the Median upper class wore high, crested tiaras.

=== In the early Hellenistic world ===
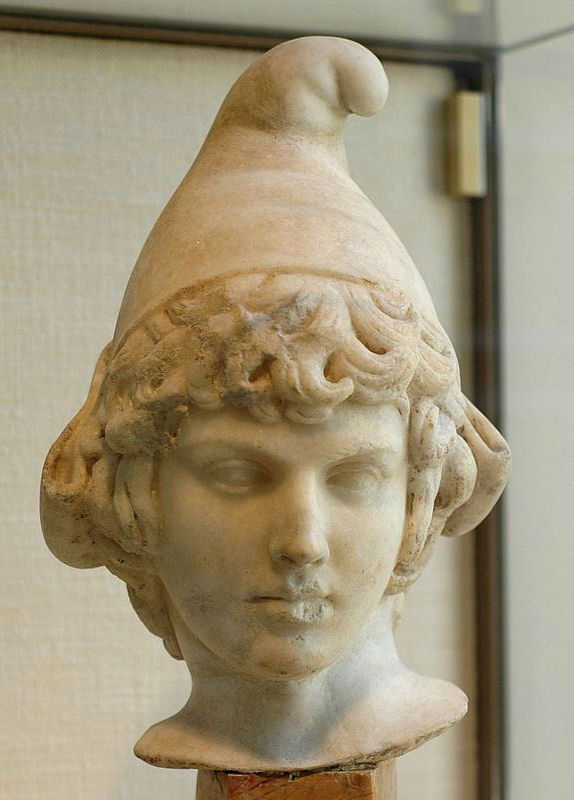
Attis

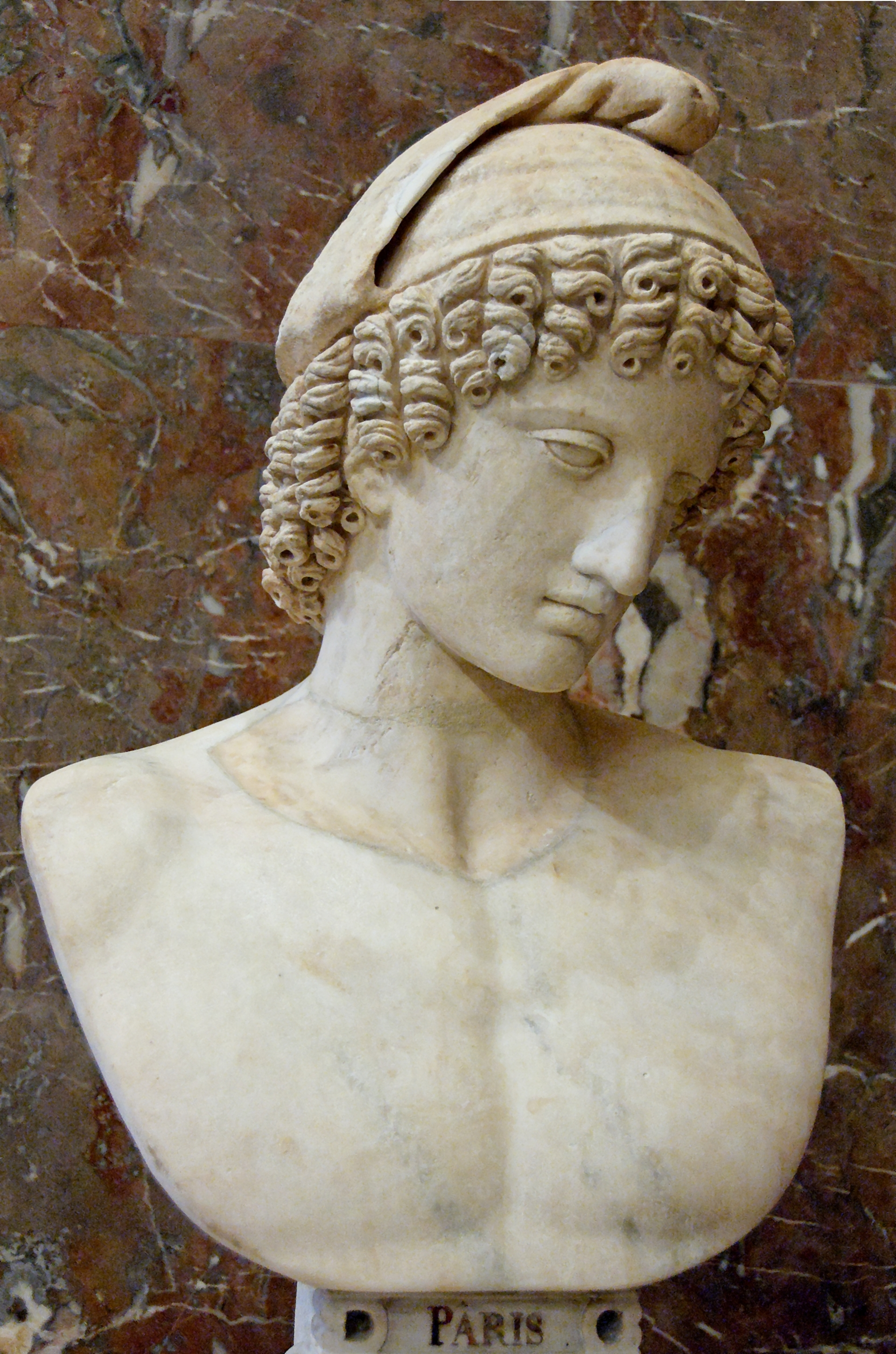
Ganymede

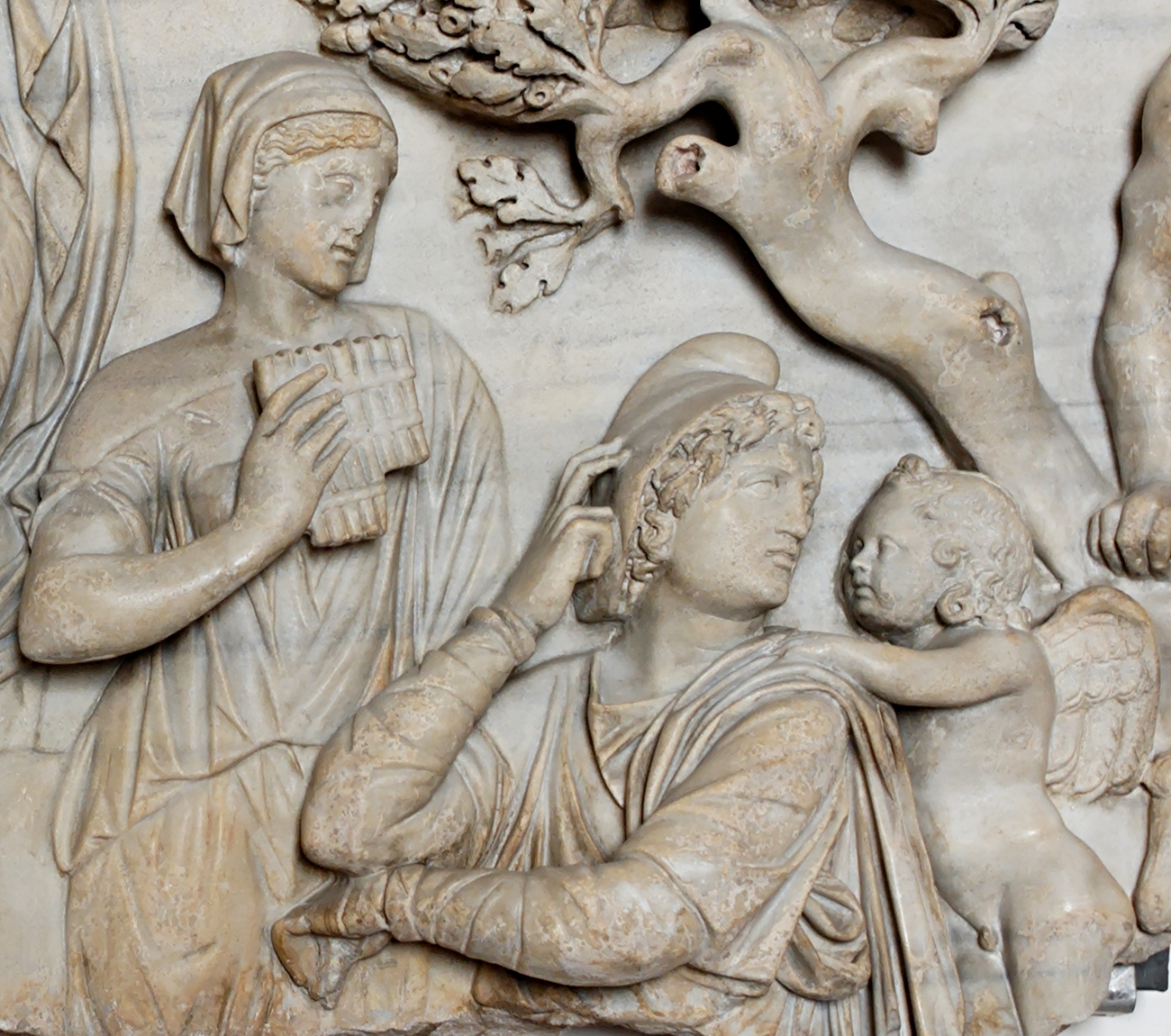
Paris of Troy

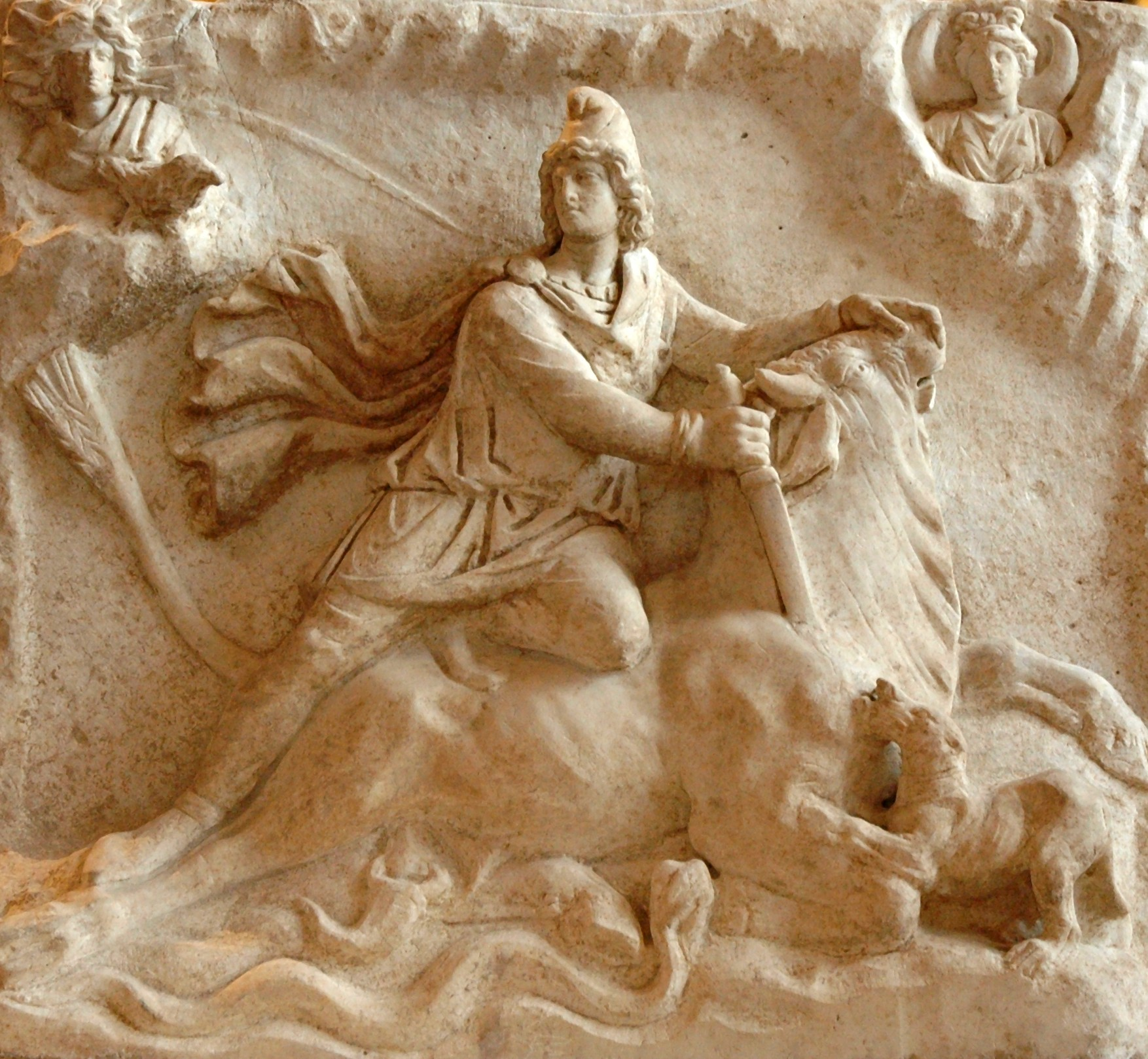
Mithras

By the 4th century BC (early Hellenistic period), the Phrygian cap was associated with Phrygian Attis, the consort of Cybele, the cult of which had by then become Hellenized. The cap appears in depictions of the mythological kings Midas and Rhesus of Thrace, the legendary bard Orpheus and other Thraco-Phrygians portrayed in Greek vase-paintings and sculpture. Such images predate the earliest surviving literary references to the cap.

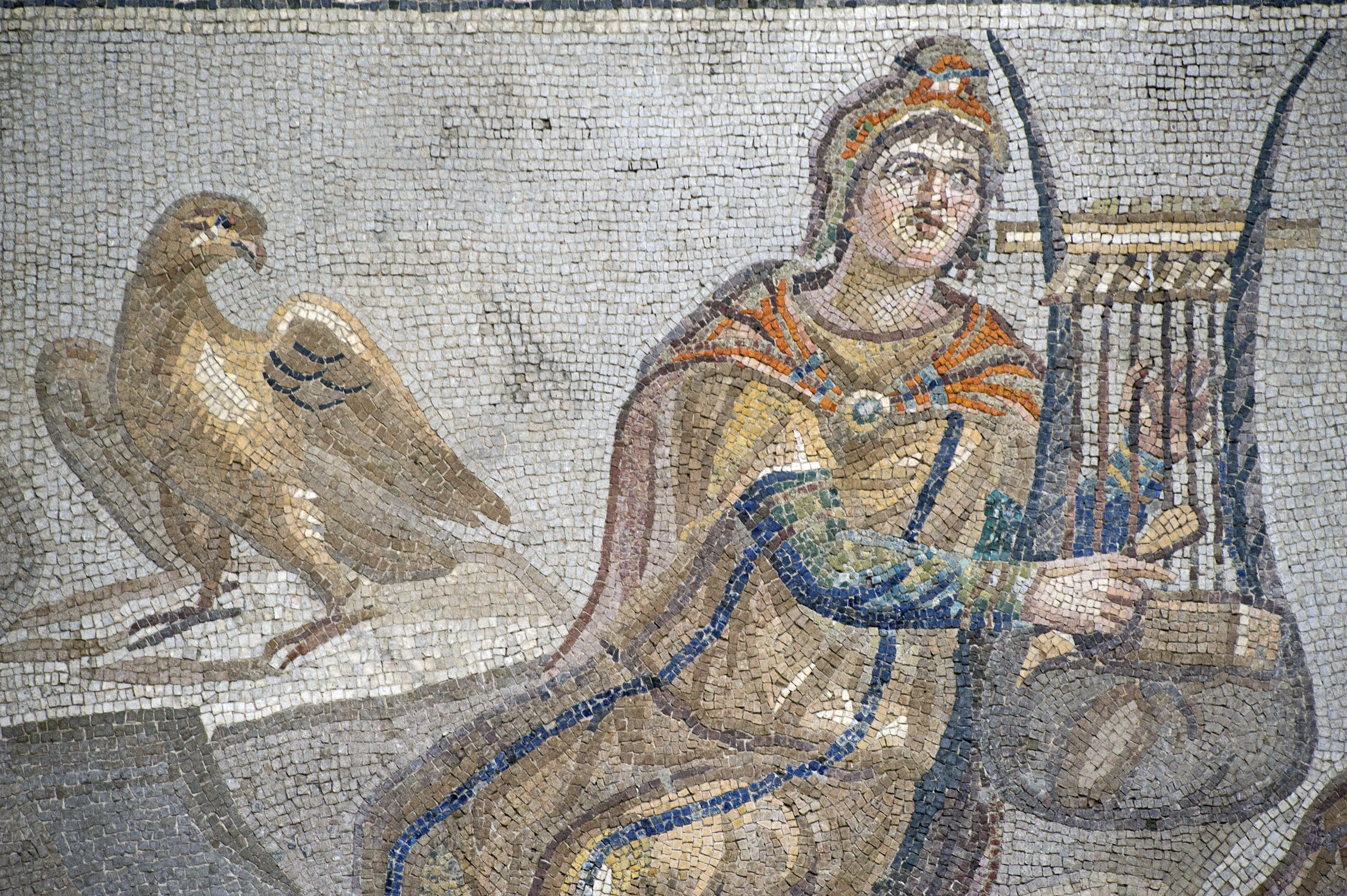
Orpheus

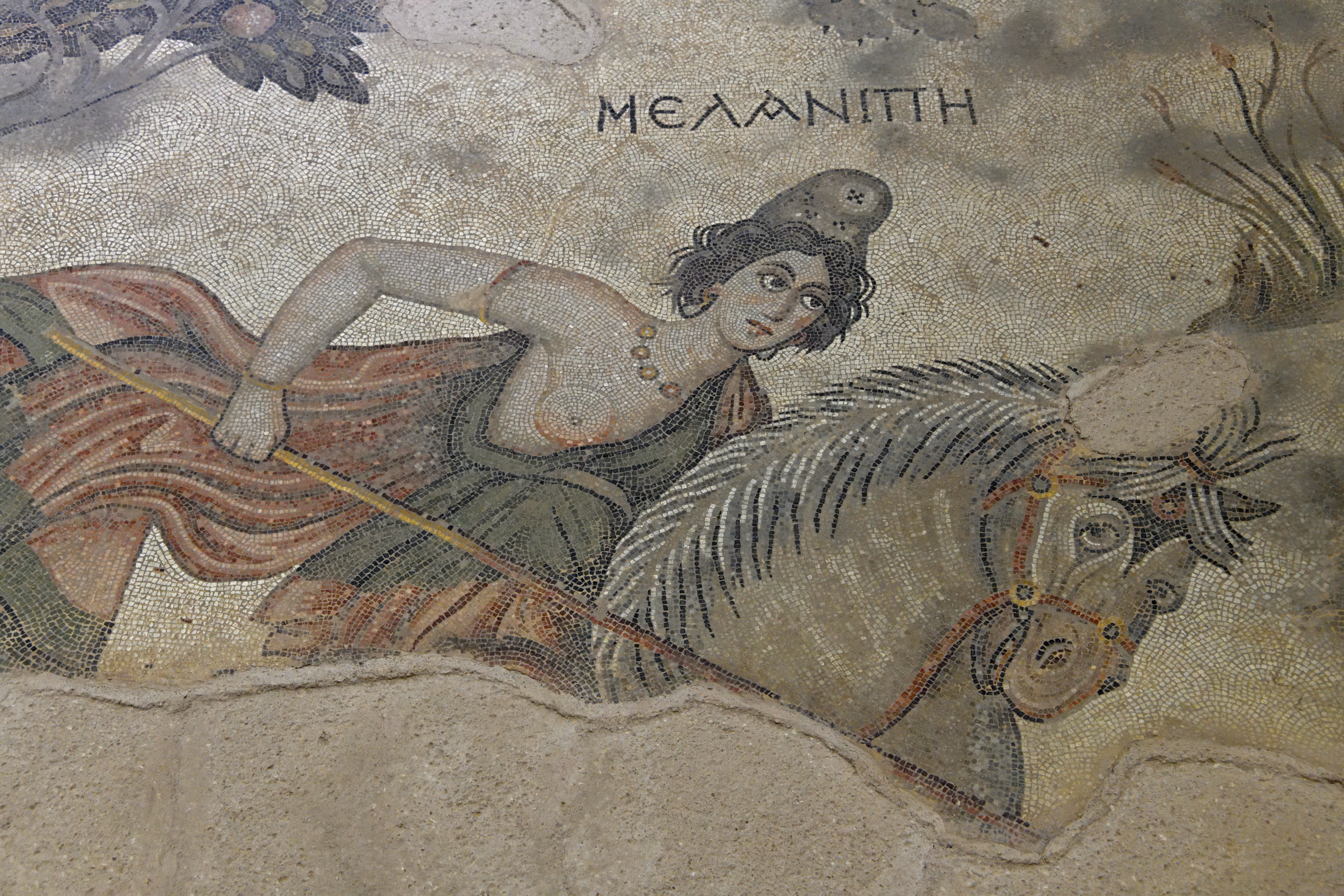
Penthesilea

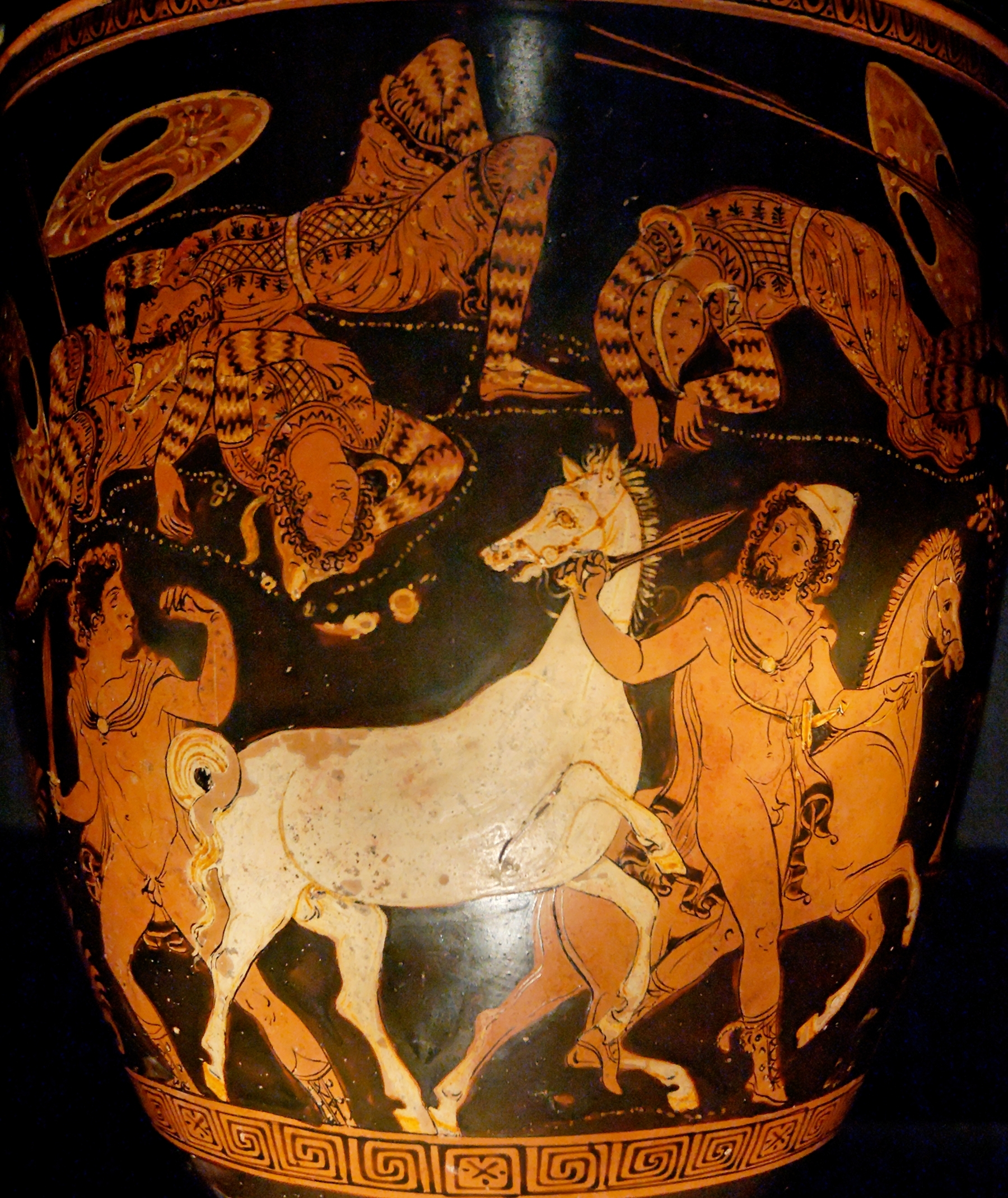
Rhesus (Top-Left)

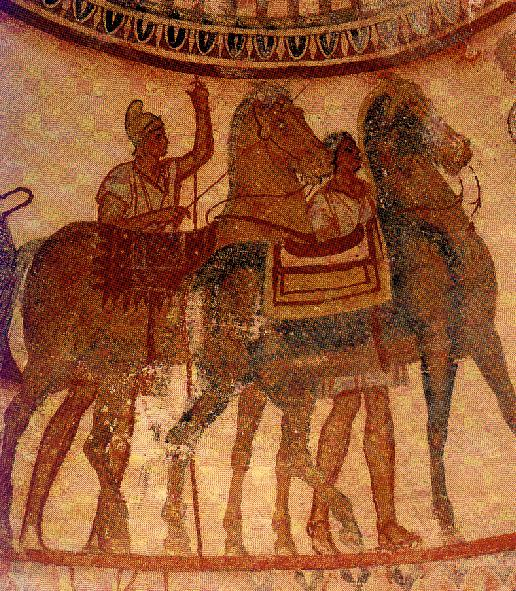
Thracian Horseman

By extension, the Phrygian cap also came to be applied to several other non-Greek-speaking peoples ("barbarians" in the classical sense). Most notable of these extended senses of "Phrygian" were the Trojans and other western Anatolian peoples, who in Greek perception were synonymous with the Phrygians, and whose heroes Paris, Aeneas, and Ganymede were all regularly depicted with a Phrygian cap. Other Greek earthenware of antiquity also depict Amazons and so-called "Scythian" archers with Phrygian caps. Although these are military depictions, the headgear is distinguished from "Phrygian helmets" by long ear flaps, and the figures are also identified as "barbarians" by their trousers. The headgear also appears in 2nd-century BC Boeotian Tanagra figurines of an effeminate Eros, and in various 1st-century BC statuary of the Commagene, in eastern Anatolia. Greek representations of Thracians also regularly appear with Phrygian caps, most notably Bendis, the Thracian goddess of the Moon and the hunt, and Orpheus, a legendary Thracian poet and musician.

While the Phrygian cap was of wool or soft leather, in pre-Hellenistic times the Greeks had already developed a military helmet that had a similarly characteristic flipped-over tip. These so-called "Phrygian helmets" (named in modern times after the cap) were usually of bronze and in prominent use in Thrace, Dacia, Magna Graecia, and the rest of the Hellenistic world from the 5th century BC up to Roman times. Owing to their superficial similarity, the cap and helmet are often difficult to distinguish in Greek art (especially in black-figure or red-figure earthenware) unless the headgear is identified as a soft flexible cap by long earflaps or a long neck flap. Also confusingly similar are the depictions of the helmets used by cavalry and light infantry (cf. Peltasts of Thrace and Paeonia), whose headgear – aside from the traditional alopekis caps of fox skin – also included stiff leather helmets in imitation of the bronze ones.

=== In the Roman world ===
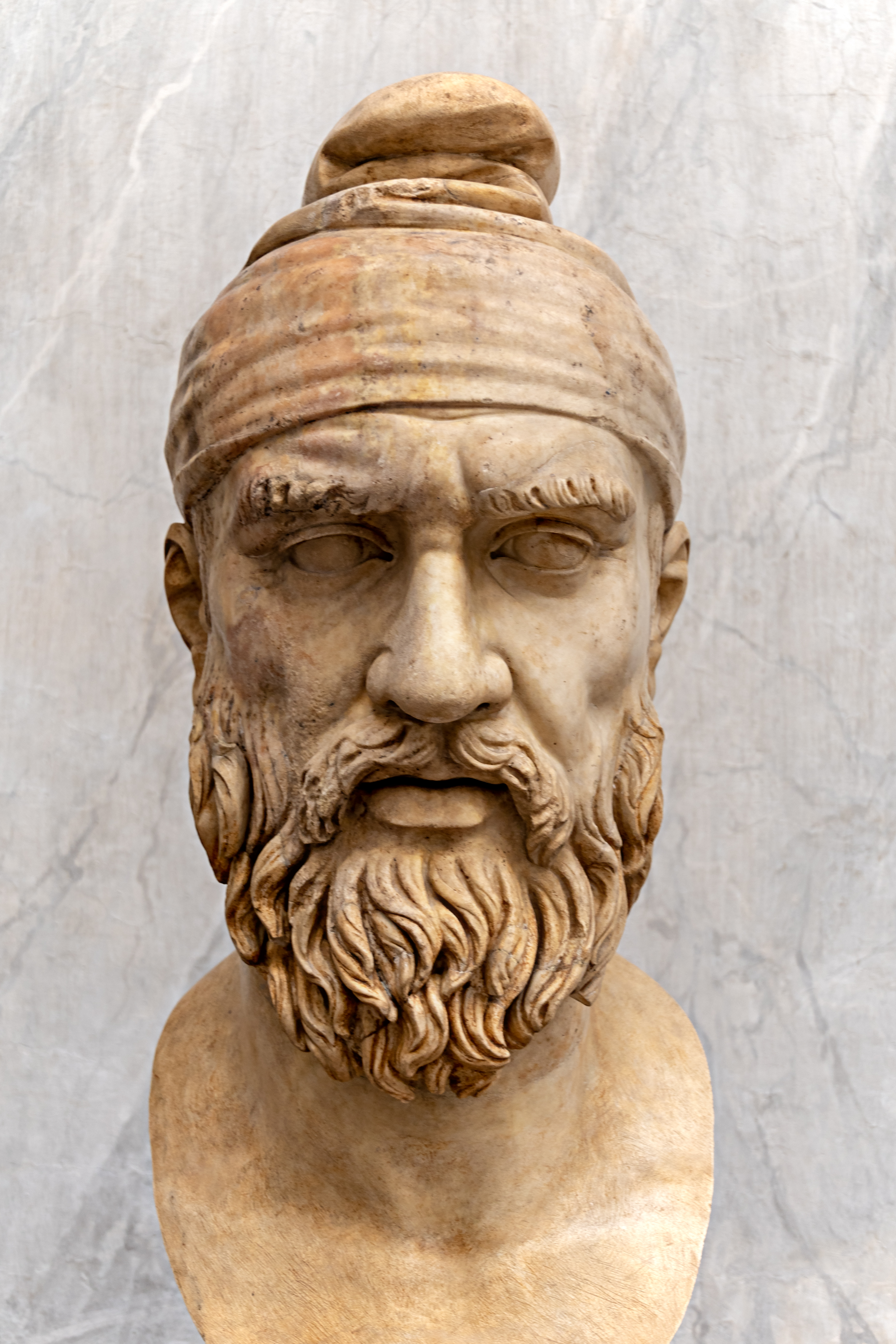
Dacian sculpture with Phrygian Cap

The Greek concept passed to the Romans in its extended sense, and thus encompassed not only to Phrygians or Trojans (which the Romans also generally associated with the term "Phrygian"), but also the other near-neighbours of the Greeks. On Trajan's Column, which commemorated Trajan's epic wars with the Dacians (101–102 and 105–106 AD), the Phrygian cap adorns the heads of Dacian warriors. The prisoner, accompanying Trajan in the monumental, three-meter-tall statue of Trajan in the ancient city of Laodicea, is wearing a Phrygian cap. Parthians appear with Phrygian caps in the 2nd-century Arch of Septimius Severus, which commemorates Roman victories over the Parthian Empire. Likewise with Phrygians caps, but for Gauls, appear in 2nd-century friezes built into the 4th-century Arch of Constantine.

The Phrygian cap reappears in figures related to the first- to fourth-century religion of Mithraism. This astrology-centric Roman mystery cult (cultus) projected itself with pseudo-Oriental trappings (known as perserie in scholarship) in order to distinguish itself from both traditional Roman religion and from the other mystery cults. In the artwork of the cult (e.g. in the so-called "tauroctony" cult images), the figures of the god Mithras as well as those of his helpers Cautes and Cautopates are routinely depicted with a Phrygian cap. The function of the Phrygian cap in the cult are unknown, but it is conventionally identified as an accessory of its perserie.

Early Christian art (and continuing well into the Middle Ages) build on the same Greco-Roman perceptions of (Pseudo-)Zoroaster and his "Magi" as experts in the arts of astrology and magic, and routinely depict the "three wise men" (that follow a star) with Phrygian caps.

Representations of Phrygian Caps from Antiquity

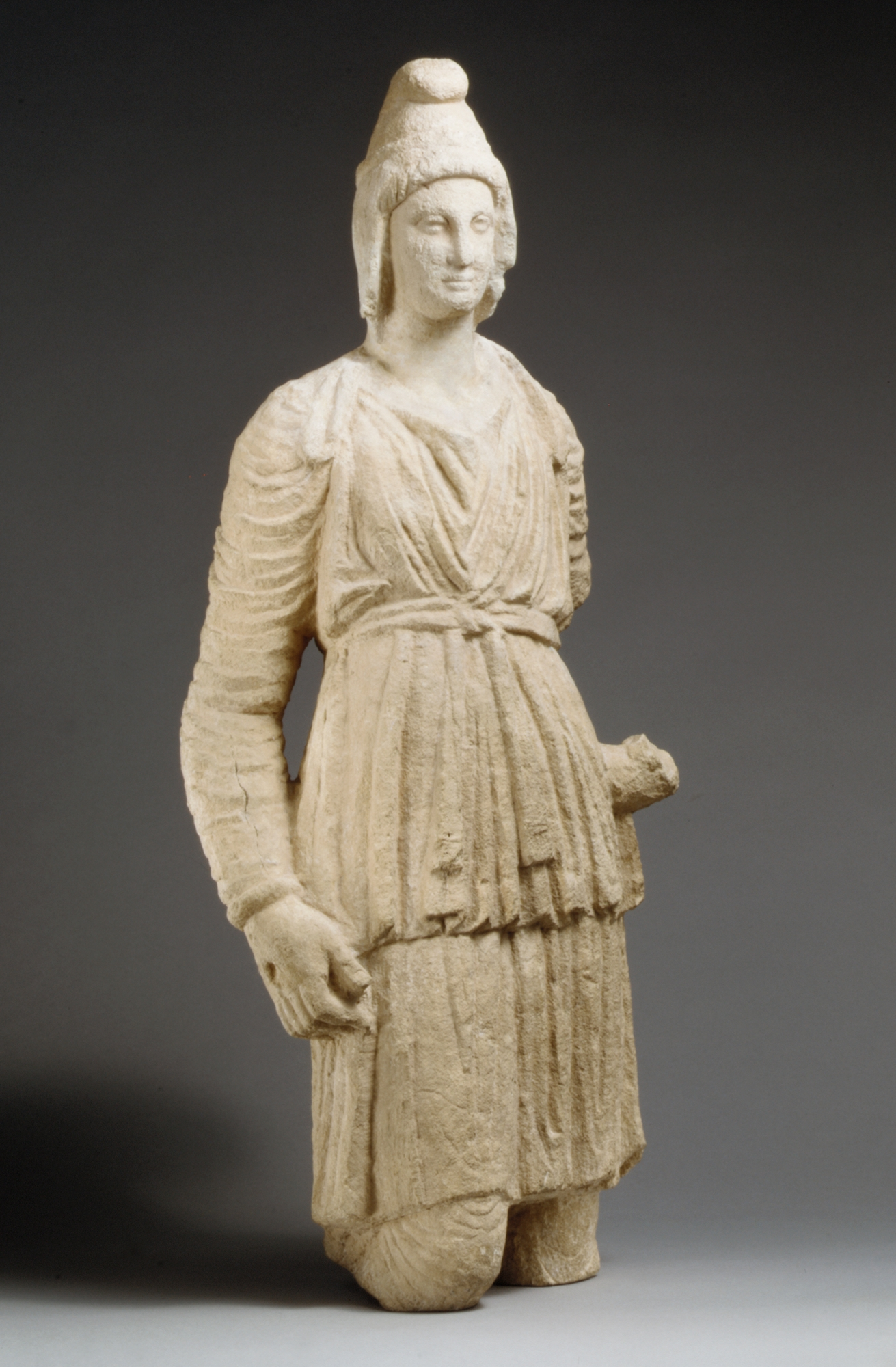
Bendis, Thracian goddess of the moon and the hunt, wearing a Phrygian cap. Limestone Statue, c. 350 BC.

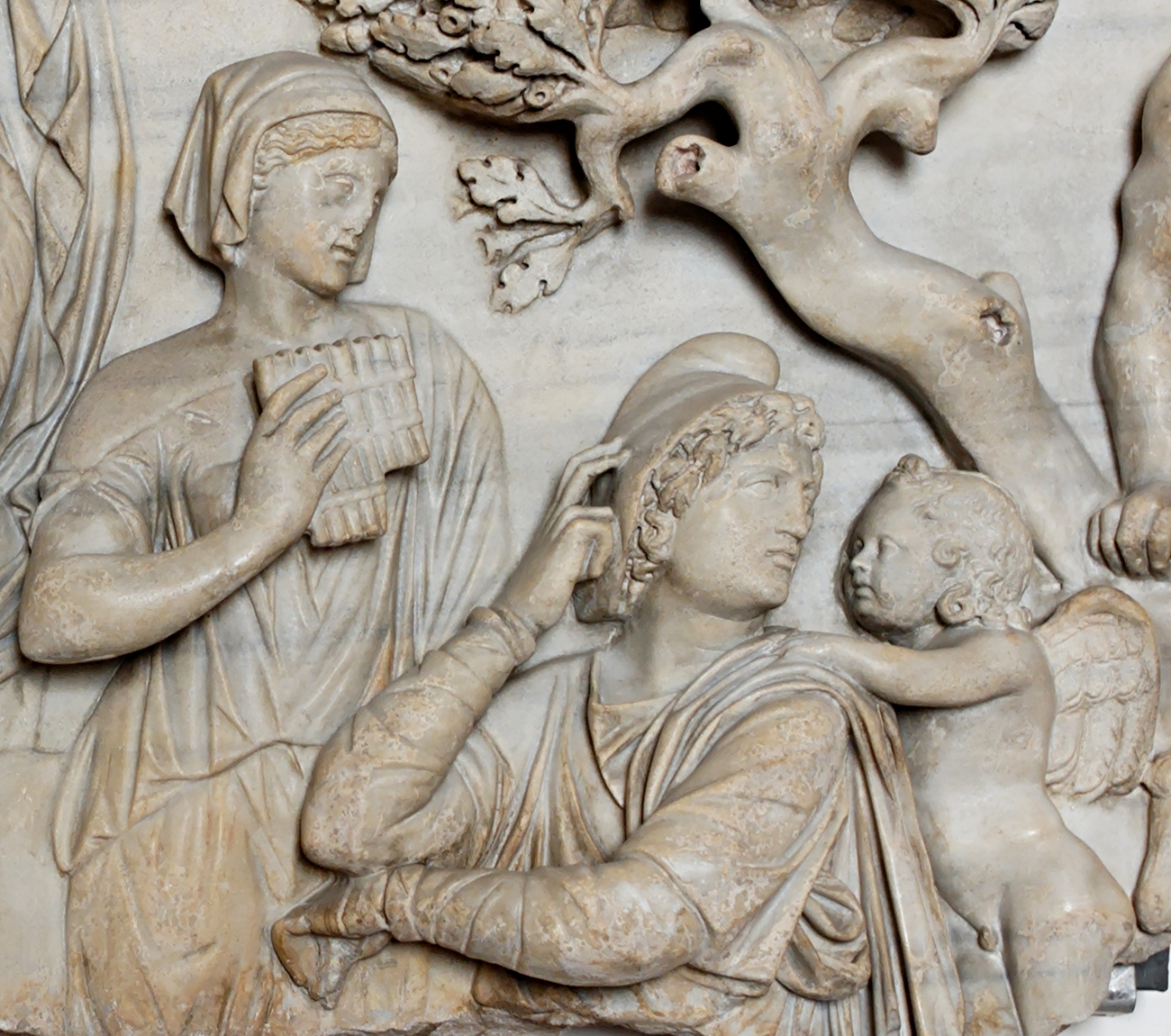
Paris of Troy wearing a Phrygian cap. Marble, Roman artwork from the Hadrianic period (117–138 AD).

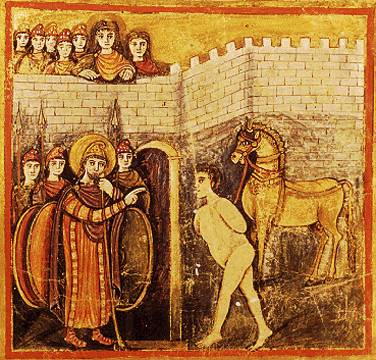
The Trojans accept the Trojan Horse - Aeneid manuscript, 4th-century.

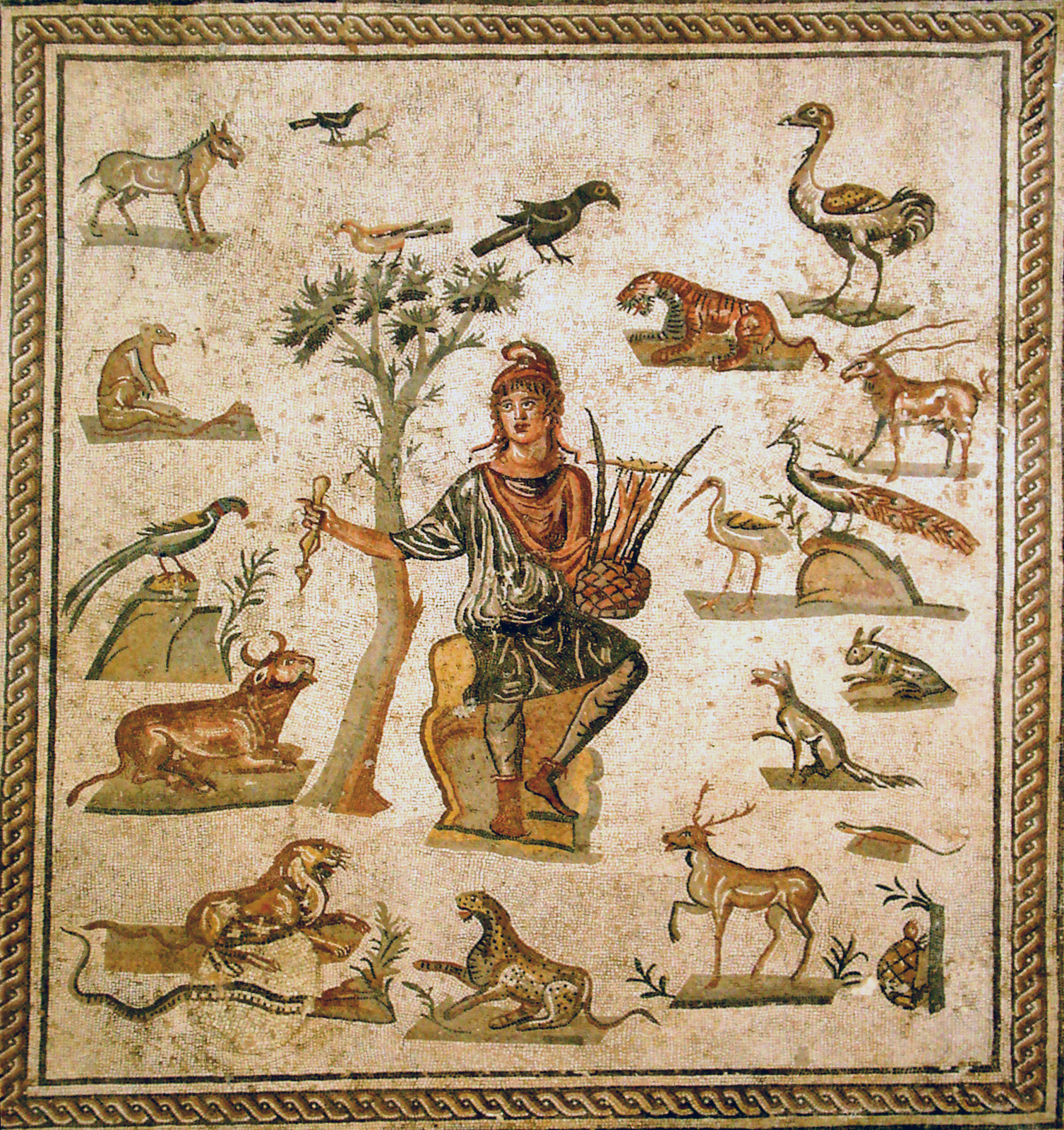
The Thracian musician Orpheus surrounded by animals. Ancient Roman floor mosaic from Sicily.

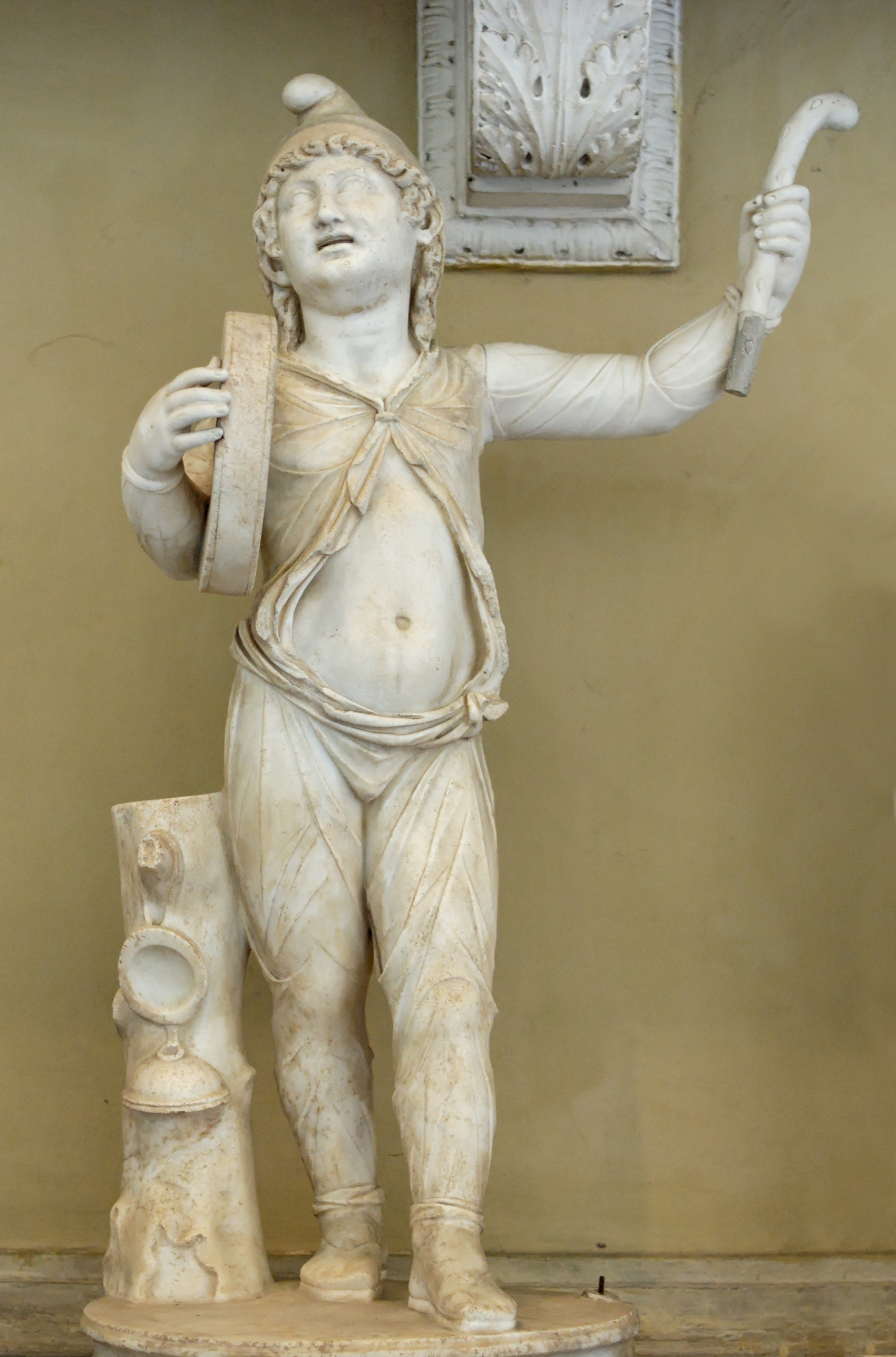
Roman sculpture of Attis, the consort of the Phrygian goddess Cybele wearing a Phrygian cap and performing a cult dance.

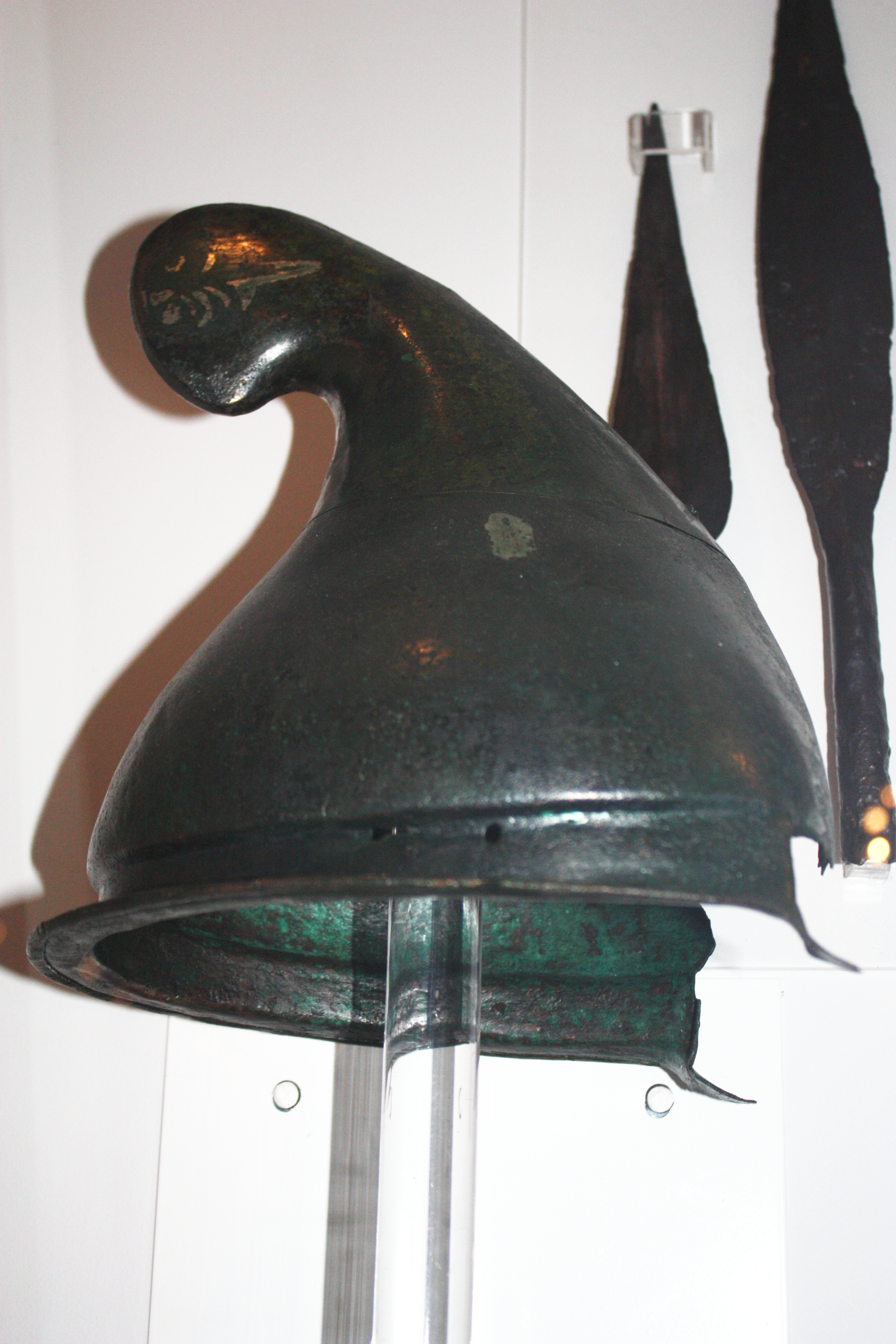
Bronze Helmet design widely used by the Thracians, 4th century BC.

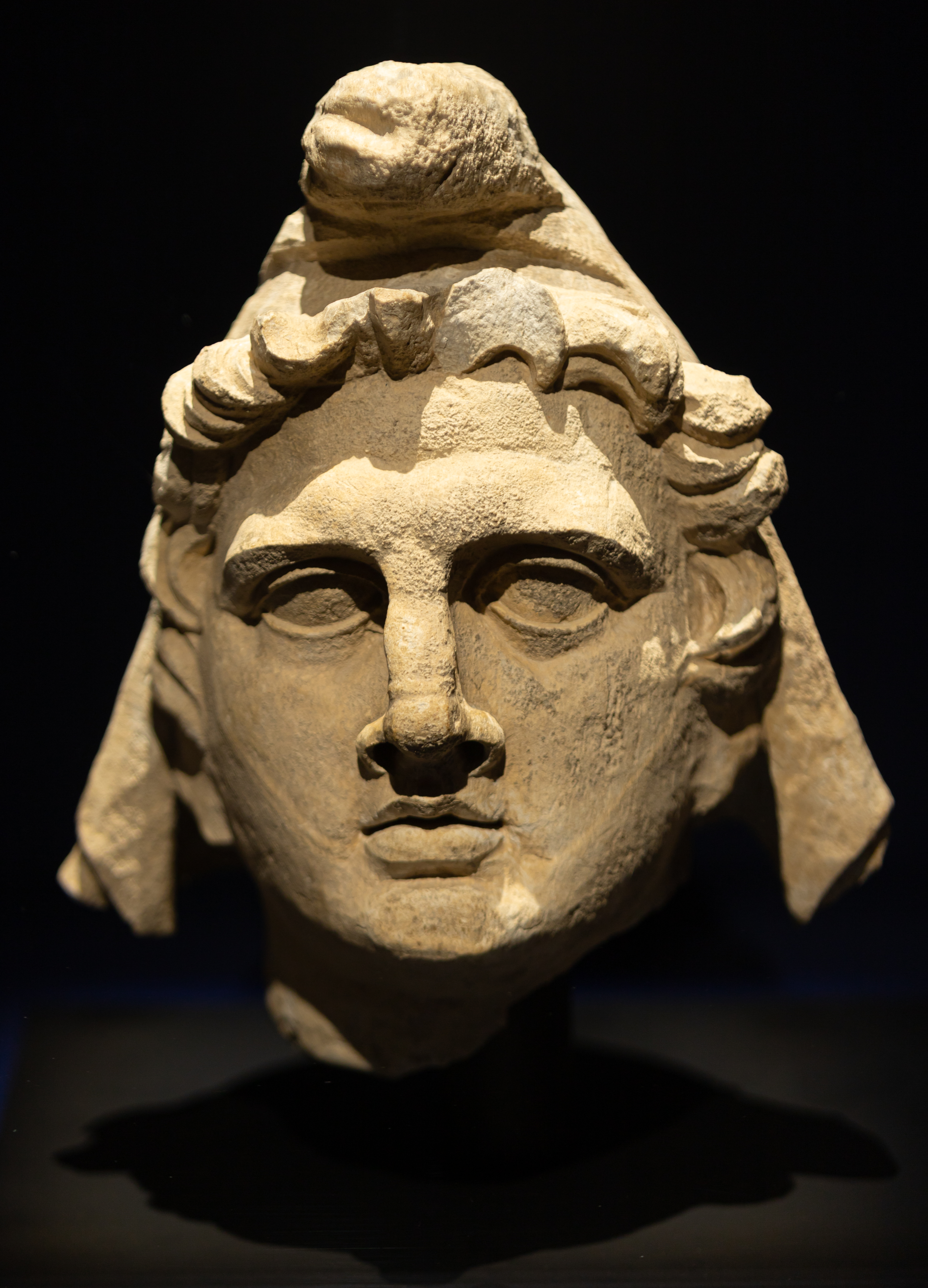
Sculpted head of Mithras, Sol Invictus, 1st century AD.

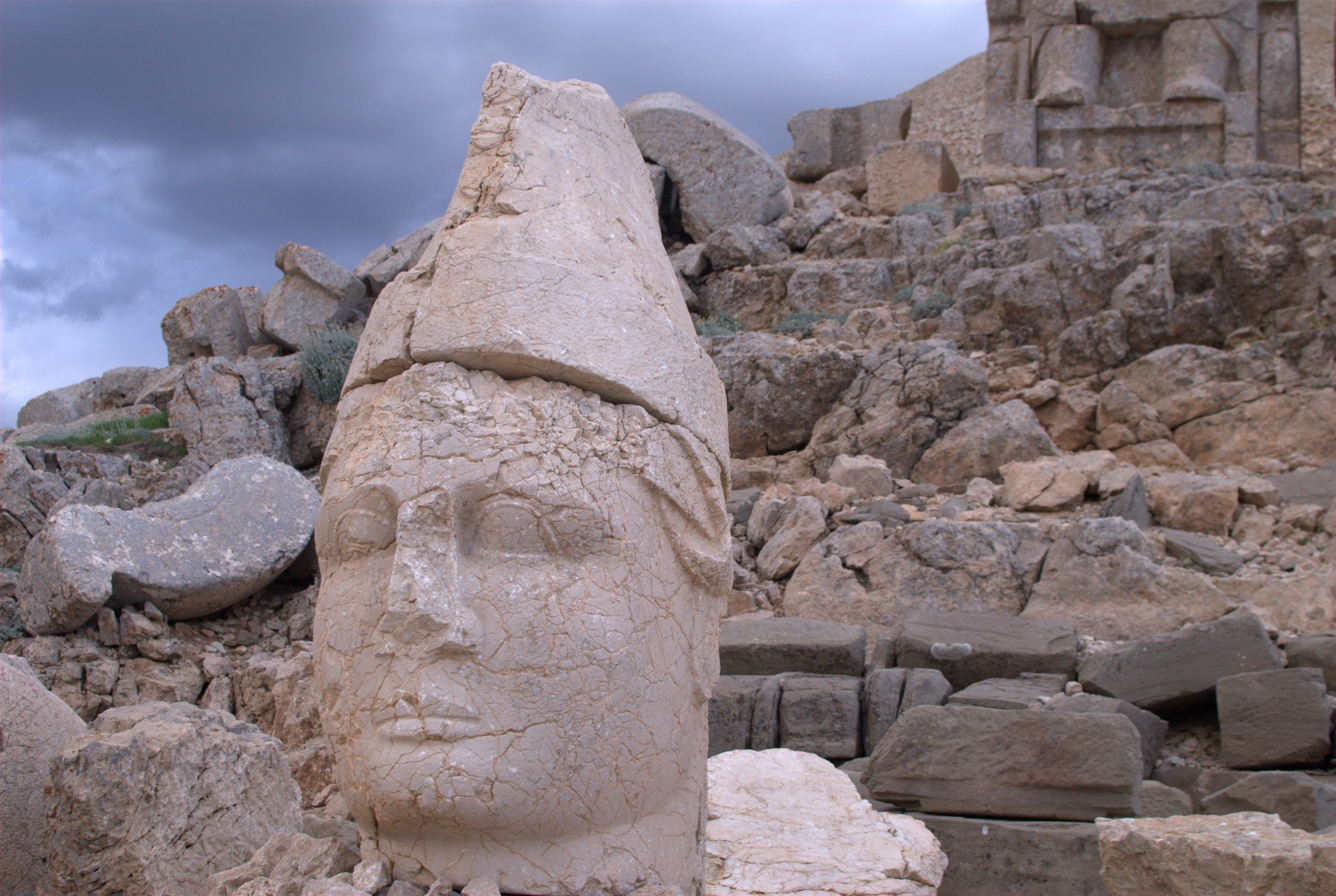
Head of Antiochus I Theos (r. 70 - 30 BC), ruler of the Commagene kingdom, Mount Nemrut, Turkey.

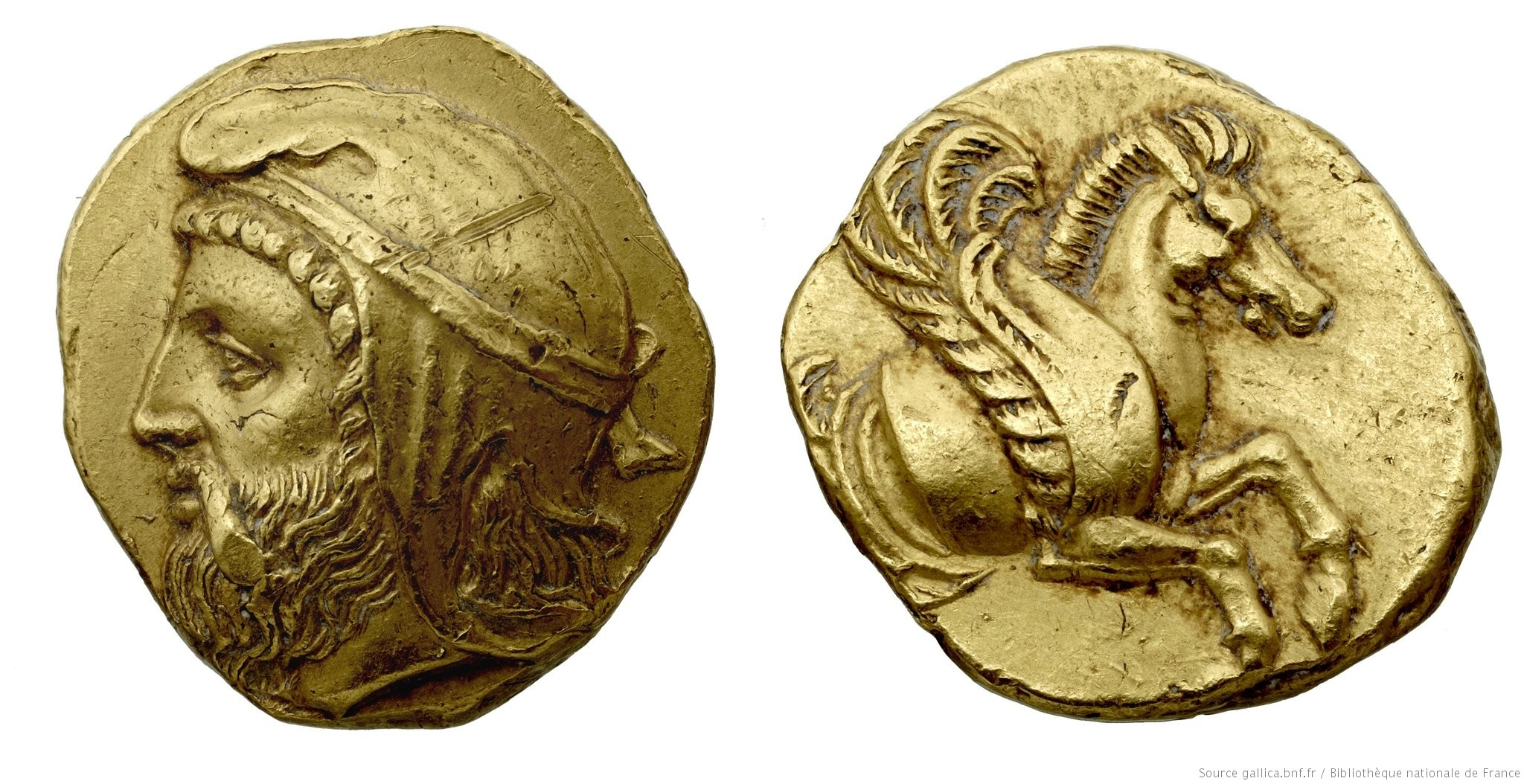
Mysian Golden Coin with the image of Orontes I, predecessor of Antiochus I Theos, 4th century BC.

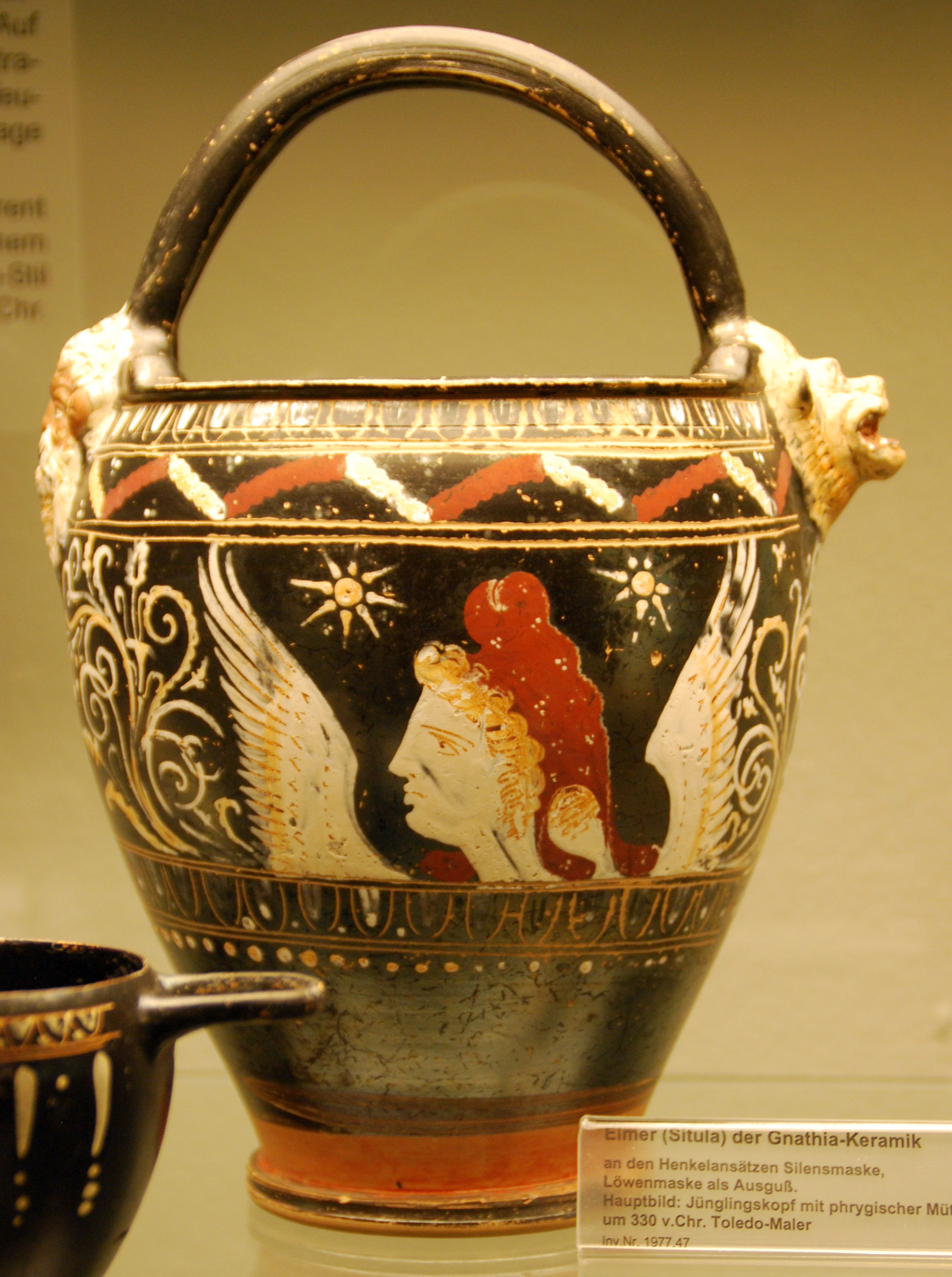
A Gnathia-style ceramic vessel with lion-head spouts from ancient Magna Graecia (Apulia, Italy), depicting a blond winged youth with a Phrygian cap, by the "Toledo" painter, c. 300 BC.

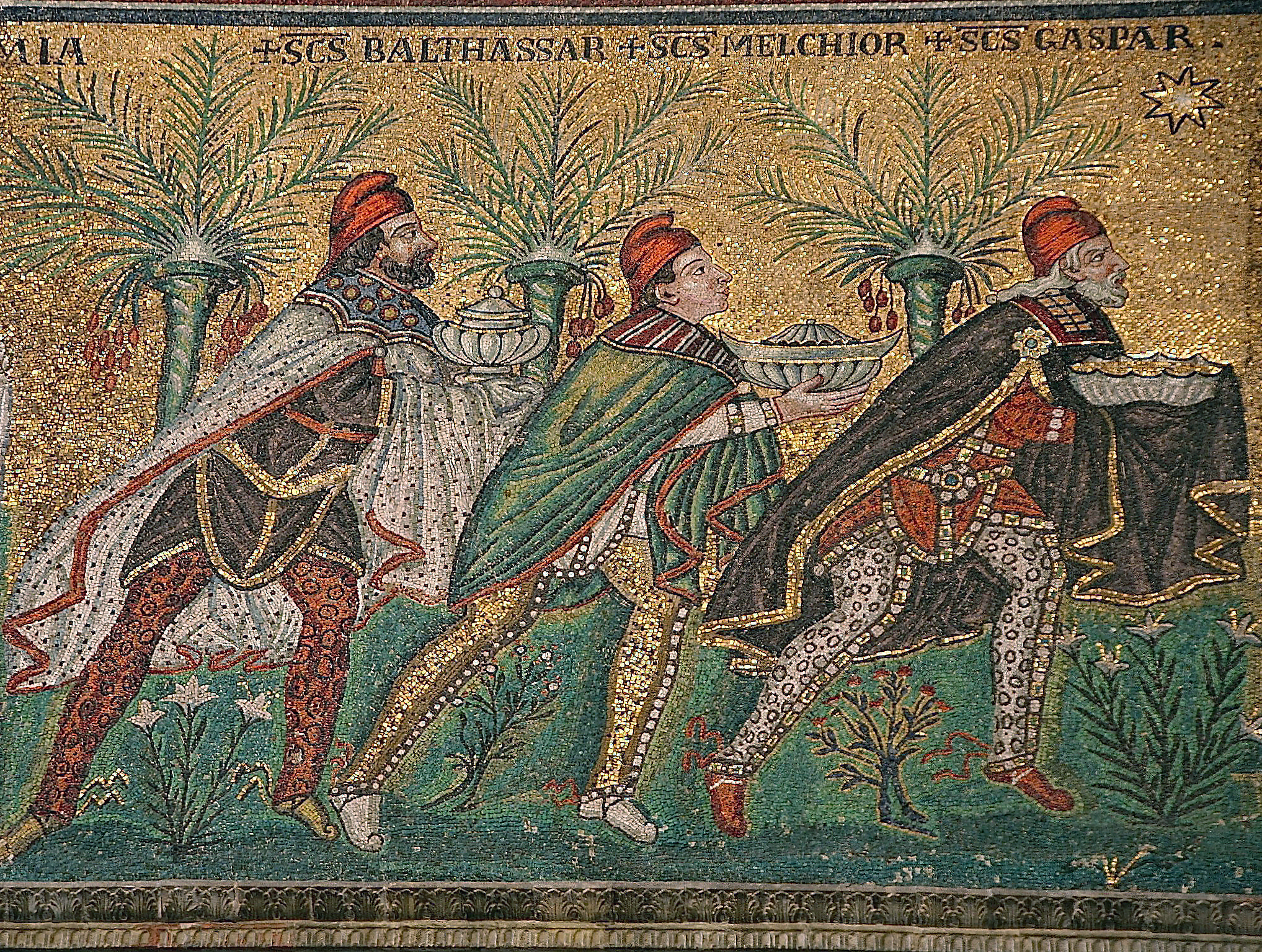
The biblical "three wise men" with Phrygian caps to identify them as "orientals". 6th-century, Basilica of Sant'Apollinare Nuovo in Ravenna, Italy.

== As a symbol of liberty ==
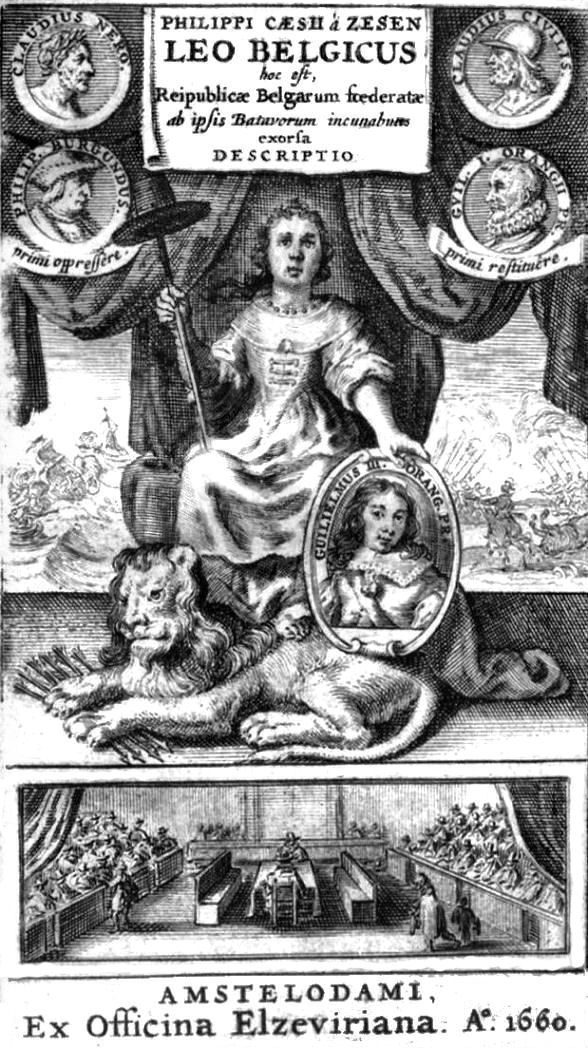
The Dutch Maiden carries her cap of liberty on a pole, and it is not of the Phrygian form. 1660

=== From Phrygian to liberty cap ===
In late Republican Rome, a soft felt cap called the pileus served as a symbol of freemen (i.e. non-slaves) and was symbolically given to slaves upon manumission, thereby granting them not only their personal liberty, but also libertas – freedom as citizens, with the right to vote (if male). Following the assassination of Julius Caesar in 44 BCE, Brutus and his co-conspirators instrumentalized this symbolism of the pileus to signify the end of Caesar's dictatorship and a return to the (Roman) republican system.

These Roman associations of the pileus with liberty and republicanism were carried forward to the 18th century, until when the pileus was confused with the Phrygian cap, then becoming a symbol of those values in the wake of Medieval Italian uses of the Phrygian cap, most notably in Venice.

In Venice, the Phrygian cap was used by the Doge instead of a crown as a symbol of Republican liberty, from the Middle Ages until 1797. The symbol of Libertas as a female figure holding the Phrygian cap upon a spear appeared in the 1500s in the Apotheosis of Venice, a major painting by Paolo Veronese in the Ducal palace, iconography that would later be reused in French and American art and coinage.

=== France's bonnet rouge ===
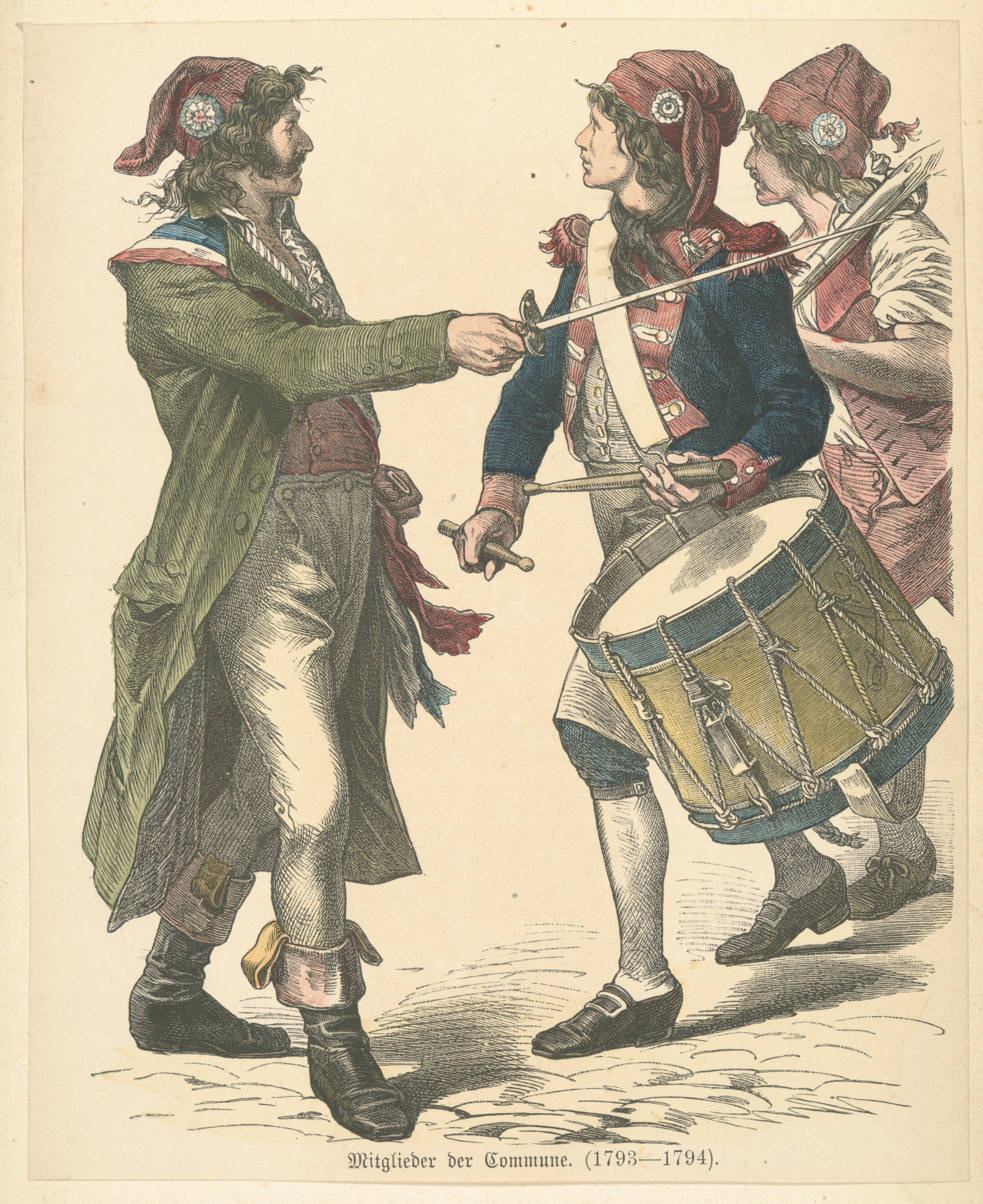
French revolutionaries wearing bonnets rouges and tricolor cockades

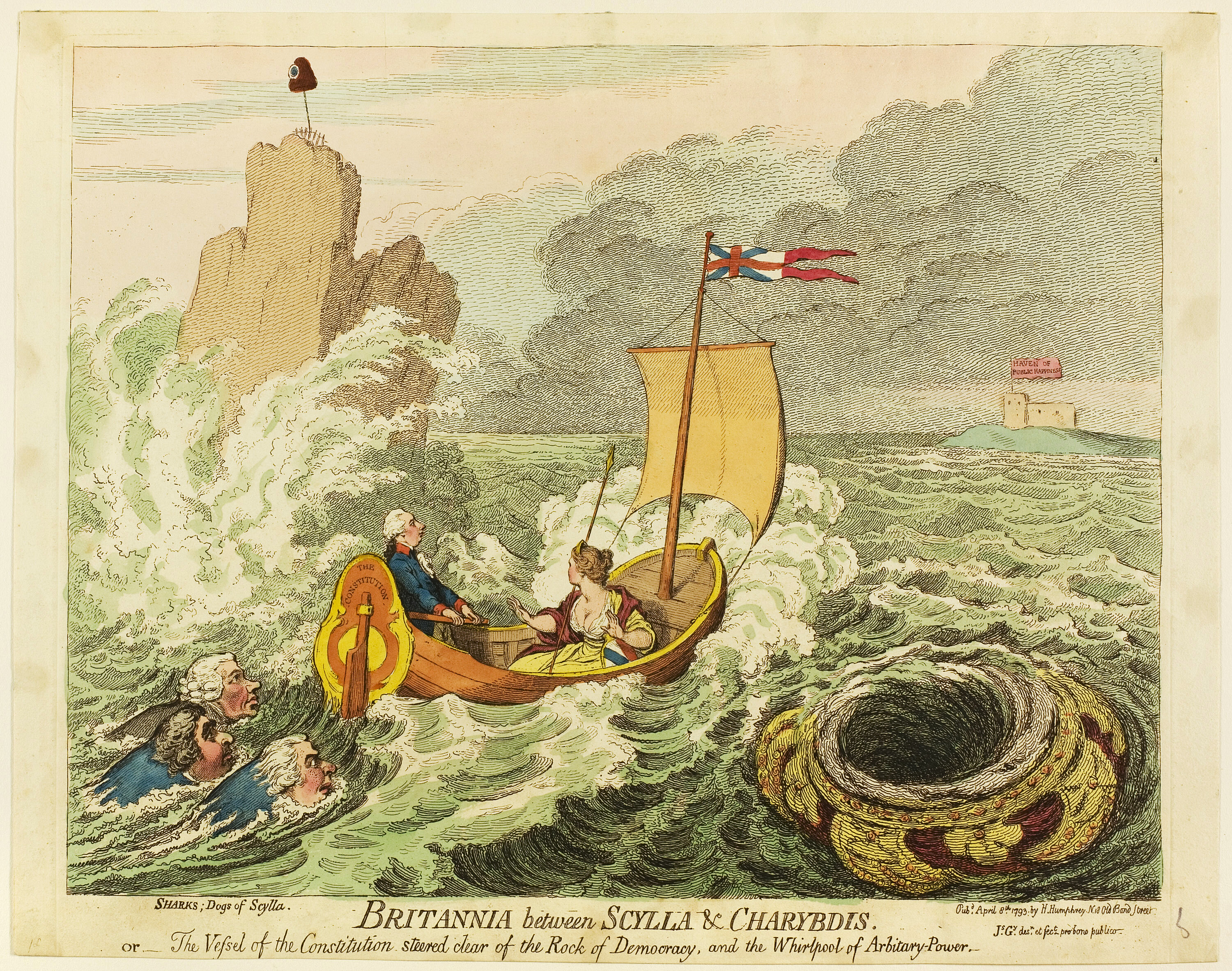
In this 1793 cartoon by James Gillray, who was deeply hostile to the French Revolution, a Phrygian cap substitutes for Scylla atop the dangerous "Rock of Democracy", as Britannia's boat (the Constitution) navigates between Scylla's rock and Charybdis, the "Whirlpool of Arbitrary-Power", pursued by Scylla's "dogs": Sheridan, Fox, and Priestley, depicted as sharks.

==== In revolutionary France ====
In 1675, the anti-tax and anti-nobility Stamp-Paper revolt erupted in Brittany and north-western France, where it became known as the bonnets rouges uprising after the blue or red caps worn by the insurgents. Although the insurgents are not known to have preferred any particular style of cap, the name and color stuck as a symbol of revolt against the nobility and establishment. Robespierre would later object to the color but was ignored.

The use of a Phrygian-style cap as a symbol of revolutionary France is first documented in May 1790, at a festival in Troyes, adorning a statue representing the nation, and at Lyon, on a lance carried by the goddess Libertas. To this day the national allegory of France, Marianne, is shown wearing a red Phrygian cap.

By wearing the bonnet rouge and sans-culottes ("without silk breeches"), the Parisian working class made their revolutionary ardor and plebeian solidarity immediately recognizable. By mid-1791 these mocking fashion statements included the bonnet rouge as Parisian hairstyle, proclaimed by the Marquis de Villette (12 July 1791) as "the civic crown of the free man and French regeneration”. On 15 July 1792, seeking to suppress the frivolity, François Christophe Kellermann, 1st Duc de Valmy, published an essay in which the Duke sought to establish the bonnet rouge as a sacred symbol that could be worn only by those with merit. The symbolic hairstyle became a rallying point and a way to mock the elaborate wigs of the aristocrats and the red caps of the bishops. On 6 November 1793 the Paris city council declared it the official hairstyle of all its members.

The bonnet rouge on a spear was proposed as a component of the national seal on 22 September 1792 during the third session of the National Convention. Following a suggestion by Gaan Coulon, the Convention decreed that convicts would not be permitted to wear the red cap, as it was consecrated as the badge of citizenship and freedom. In 1792, when Louis XVI was induced to sign a constitution, popular prints of the king were doctored to show him wearing the bonnet rouge. The bust of Voltaire was crowned with the red bonnet of liberty after a performance of his Brutus at the Comédie-Française in March 1792.

During the period of the Reign of Terror (September 1793 – July 1794), the cap was adopted defensively even by those who might be denounced as moderates or aristocrats and were especially keen to advertise their adherence to the new regime. The caps were often knitted by women known as tricoteuses, who sat beside the guillotine during public executions in Paris and supposedly continued knitting in between executions. The spire of Strasbourg Cathedral was crowned with a bonnet rouge in order to prevent it from being torn down in 1794.

==== During the Restoration ====
In 1814, the Acte de déchéance de l'Empereur decision formally deposed the Bonapartes and restored the Bourbon regime, who in turn proscribed the bonnet rouge, La Marseillaise and Bastille Day celebrations. The symbols reappeared briefly in March–July 1815 during "Napoleon's Hundred Days", but were immediately suppressed again following the second restoration of Louis XVIII on 8 July 1815.

The symbols resurfaced again during the July Revolution of 1830, after which they were reinstated by the liberal July Monarchy of Louis Philippe I, and the revolutionary symbols—anthem, holiday, and bonnet rouge—became "constituent parts of a national heritage consecrated by the state and embraced by the public."

==== In modern France ====
20 centimes with Marianne on obverse
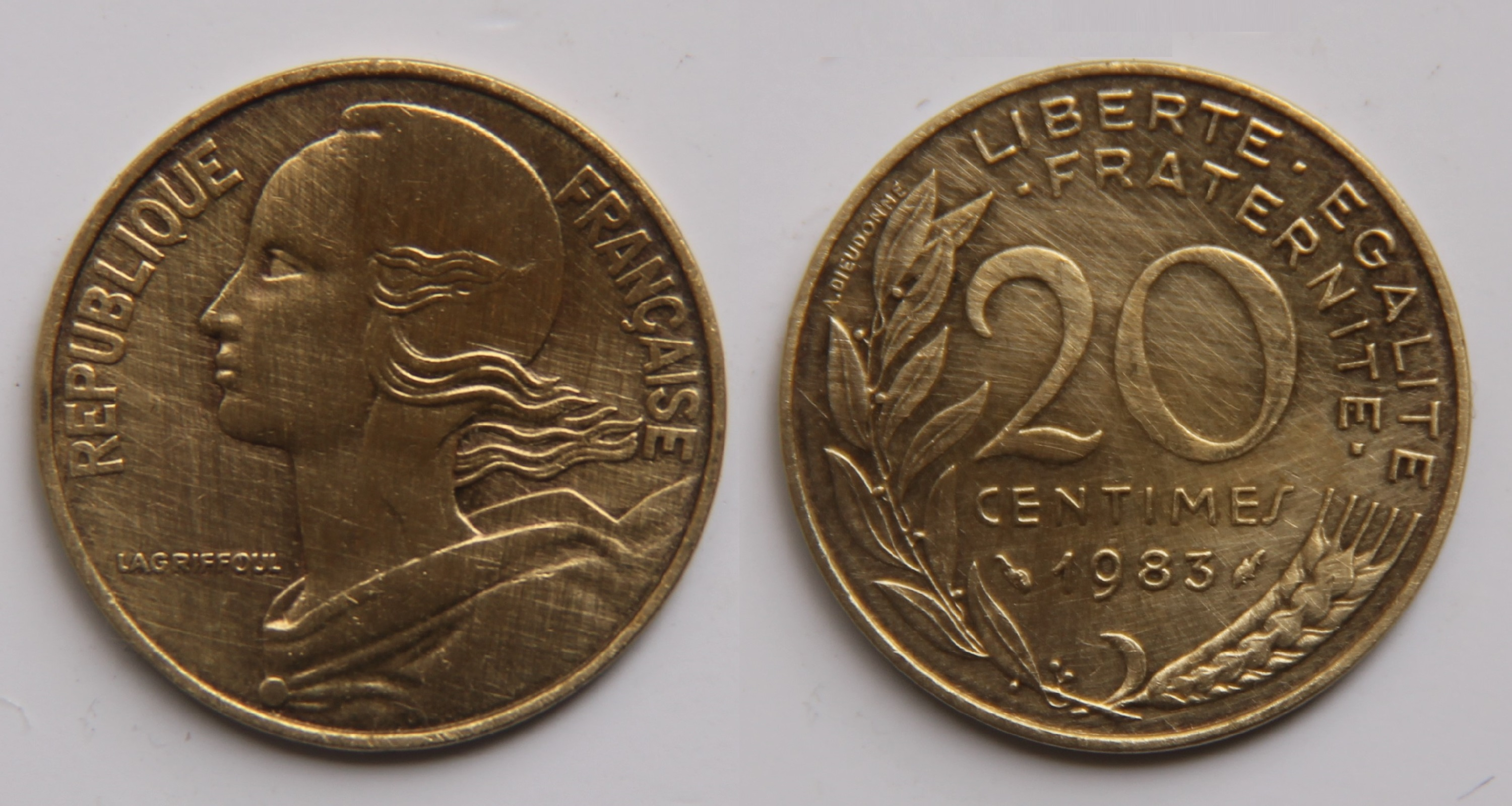
First side of the image: Obverse: Marianne wearing the Phrygian cap of liberty.
Second side of the image: Reverse: Face value and French motto: "Liberté, égalité, fraternité".
This coin was minted from 1962 to 2001.

The republican associations with the bonnet rouge were adopted as the name and emblem of a French satirical republican and anarchist periodical published between 1913 and 1922 by Miguel Almereyda that targeted the Action française, a royalist, counter-revolutionary movement on the extreme right.

The anti-tax associations with the bonnet rouge were revived in October 2013, when a French tax-protest movement called the Bonnets Rouges used the red revolution-era Phrygian cap as a protest symbol. By means of large demonstrations and direct action, which included the destruction of many highway trucking tax portals, the movement successfully forced the French government to rescind the tax.

=== In the United Kingdom ===
In the 18th century, the cap was often used in English political prints as an attribute of Liberty. In Blackburn, England, on 5 July 1819, female reformers such as Alice Kitchen attended their first reform meeting and presented the chairman, John Knight, with a "most beautiful Cap of Liberty, made of scarlet silk or satin, lined with green, with a serpentined gold lace, terminating with a rich gold tassel.

=== In Revolutionary America ===
A Phrygian cap on the Seal of the U.S. Senate

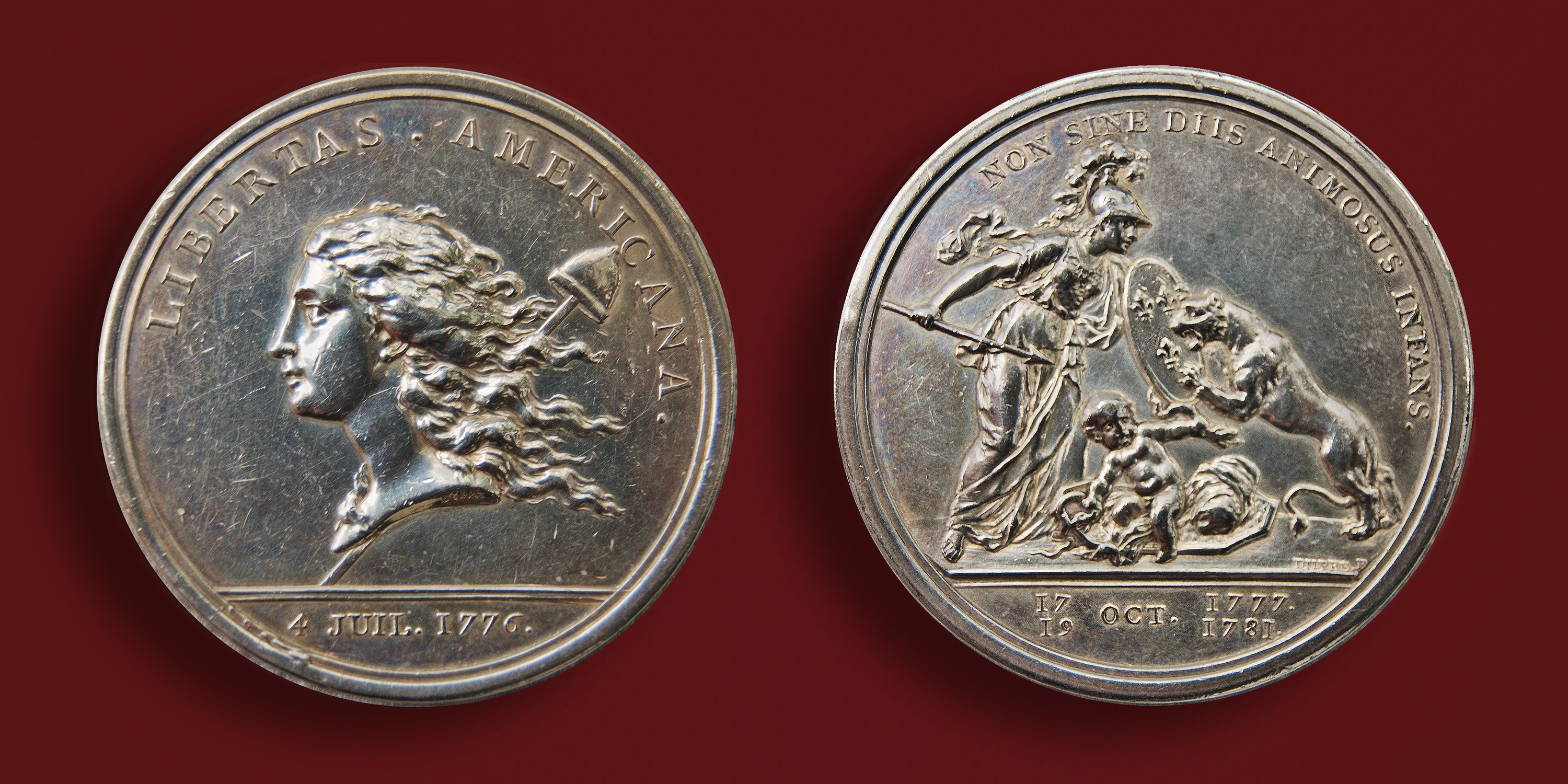
The 1783 Libertas Americana medal, initiated and designed by Benjamin Franklin, honors the American Revolution and depicts the goddess of Liberty carrying a Phrygian cap

In the years just prior to the Revolutionary War, Americans copied or emulated some of those prints in an attempt to visually defend their "rights as Englishmen". Later, the symbol of republicanism and anti-monarchical sentiment appeared in the United States as the headgear of Columbia, who in turn was visualized as a goddess-like female national personification of the United States and of Liberty herself. The cap reappears in association with Columbia in the early years of the republic, for example, on the obverse of the 1785 Immune Columbia pattern coin, which shows the goddess with a helmet seated on a globe holding in a right hand a furled U.S. flag topped by the liberty cap.

Starting in 1793, U.S. coinage frequently showed Columbia/Liberty wearing the cap. The anti-federalist movement likewise instrumentalized the figure, as in a cartoon from 1796 in which Columbia is overwhelmed by a huge American eagle holding a Liberty Pole under its wings. The cap's last appearance on circulating coinage was the Walking Liberty Half Dollar, which was minted through 1947 (and reused on the current bullion American Silver Eagle).

The U.S. Army has, since 1778, used a "War Office Seal" in which the motto "This We'll Defend" is displayed directly over a Phrygian cap on an upturned sword. It also appears on the state flags of West Virginia and Idaho (as part of their official seals), New Jersey, and New York, as well as the official seal of the United States Senate, the state of Iowa, the state of North Carolina (as well as the arms of its Senate,) and on the reverse side of both the Seal of Pennsylvania and the Seal of Virginia.

In 1854, when sculptor Thomas Crawford was preparing models for sculpture for the United States Capitol, then-Secretary of War Jefferson Davis insisted that a Phrygian cap not be included on a Statue of Freedom, on the grounds that "American liberty is original and not the liberty of the freed slave". The cap was not included in the final bronze version that is now in the building.

=== In Latin America and Haiti ===
Many of the anti-colonial revolutions in Latin America were heavily inspired by the imagery and slogans of the American and French Revolutions. As a result, the cap has appeared on the coats of arms of many Latin American nations. The coat of arms of Haiti includes a Phrygian cap to commemorate that country's foundation by rebellious slaves.

The cap had also been displayed on certain Mexican coins (most notably the old 8-reales coin) through the late 19th century into the mid-20th century. Today, it is featured on the coats of arms or national flags of Argentina, Bolivia, Colombia, Republica Dominicana, Cuba, El Salvador, Haiti, Nicaragua and Paraguay.

The Phrygian cap in Latin American and Haitian coats of arms and flags

- Coat of arms of Argentina
- Coat of arms of Bolivia, featured on the state flag of Bolivia
- Coat of arms of Colombia, featured on the naval ensign of Colombia
- Coat of arms of Cuba
- Coat of arms of El Salvador, featured on the flag of El Salvador
- Coat of arms of Haiti, featured on the flag of Haiti
- Coat of arms of Nicaragua, featured on the flag of Nicaragua
- Reverse side of the coat of arms of Paraguay, featured on the reverse of the flag of Paraguay
The coat of arms of Haiti includes a Phrygian cap on top of a palm tree, commemorating that country's foundation in a slave revolt.

The coat of arms of Argentina includes a Phrygian cap atop a pike being held by two clasping hands, as a symbol of national unity and the willingness to fight for freedom.

The coat of arms of Colombia includes a Phrygian cap as a symbol of liberty and freedom.

== Gallery ==
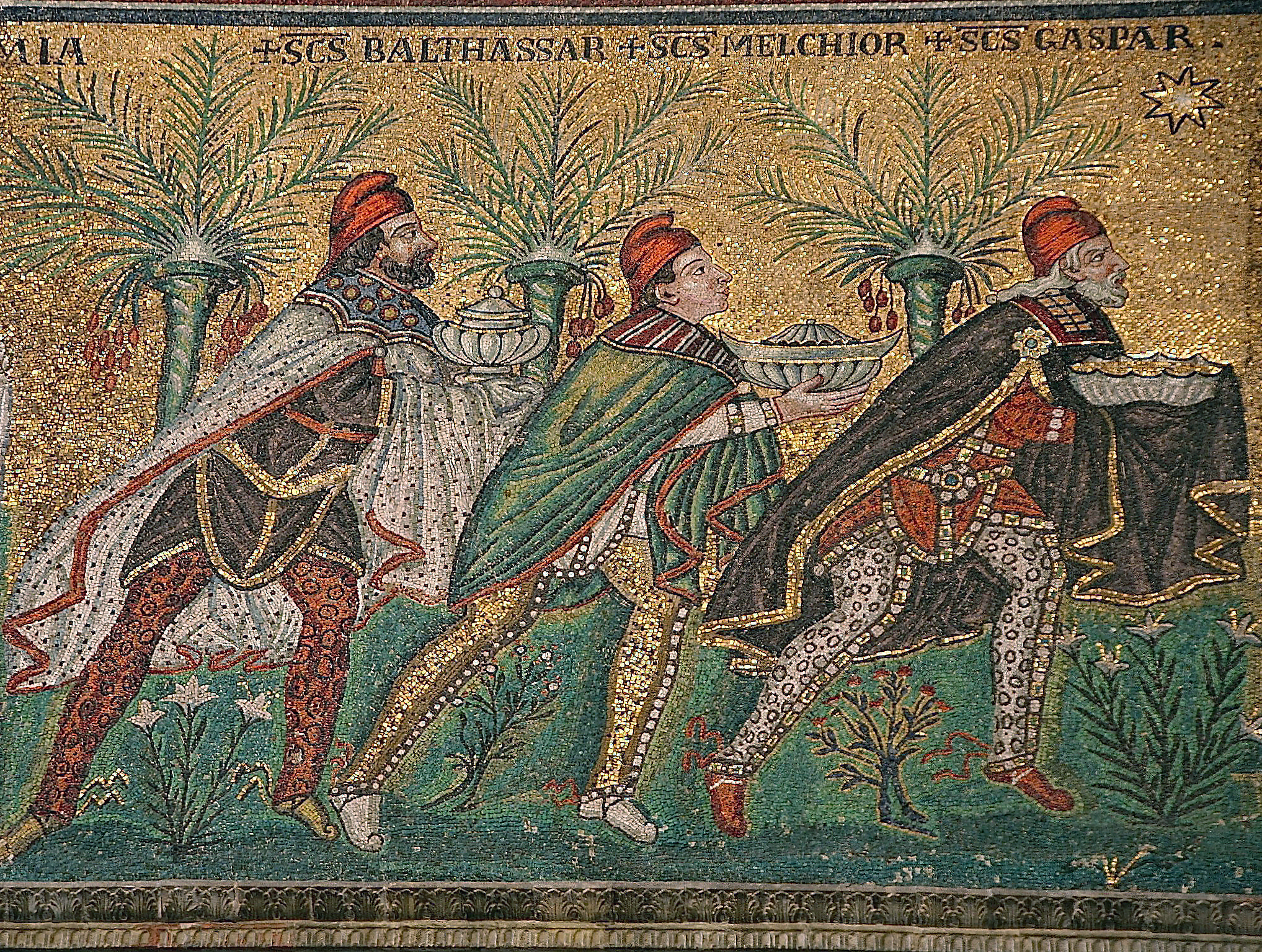
In the Byzantine Empire, Phrygia lay in Anatolia to the east of Constantinople, however, in this late 6th-century mosaic from the Basilica of Sant'Apollinare Nuovo, Ravenna, Italy, which was erected by the Ostrogothic king Theodoric the Great as his palace chapel, during the first quarter of the 6th century (as attested to in the Liber Pontificalis). This Arian church (which was within the Eastern Empire at that time) was originally dedicated in 504 AD to "Christ the Redeemer"; the Three Magi wear Phrygian caps as their Getic forefathers did, in order to identify them as "Zoroastrians".

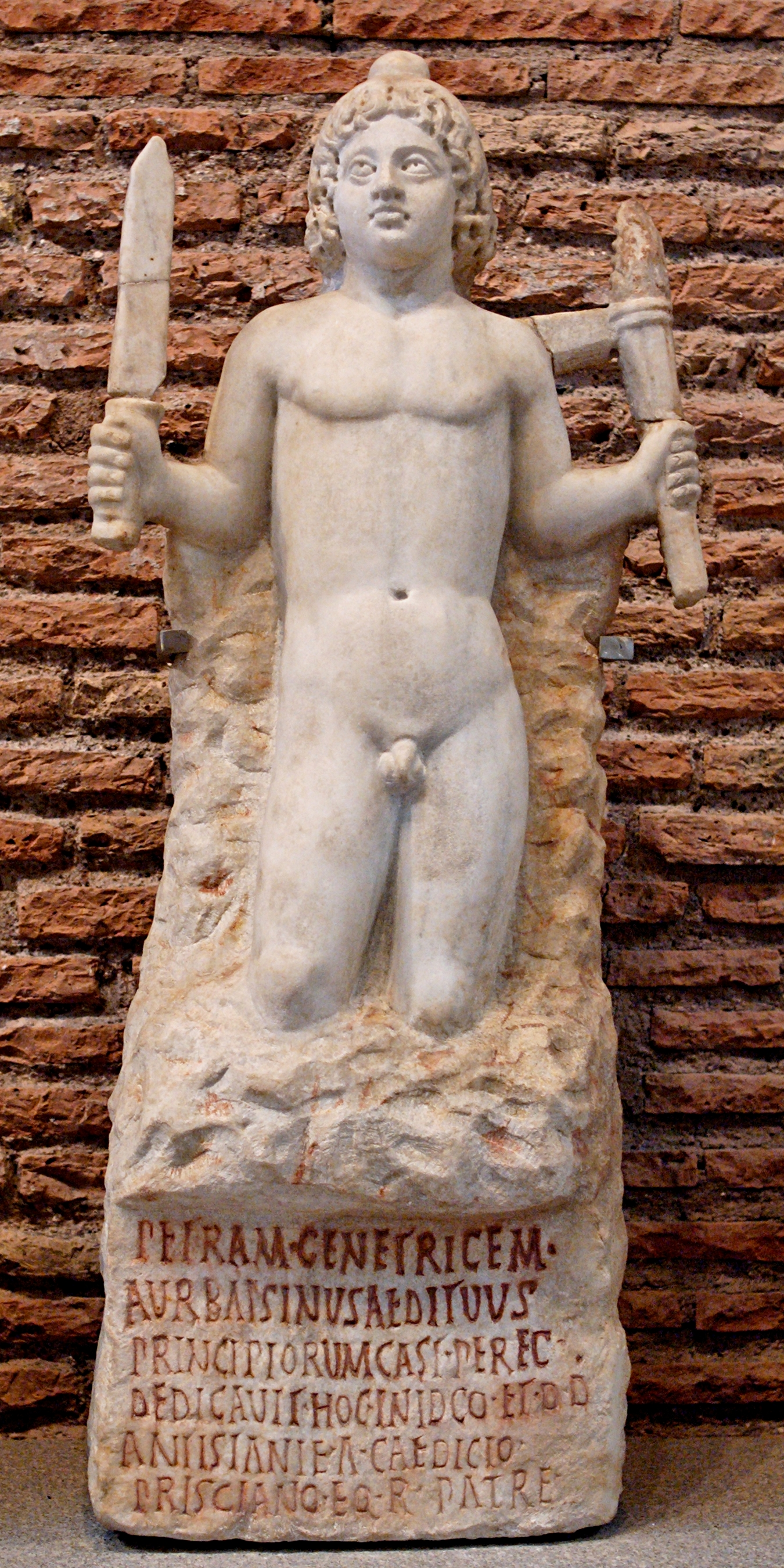
The god Mithras being born from the rock, naked but for the Phrygian cap on his head (Marble, 180–192 AD. From the area of S. Stefano Rotondo, Rome).

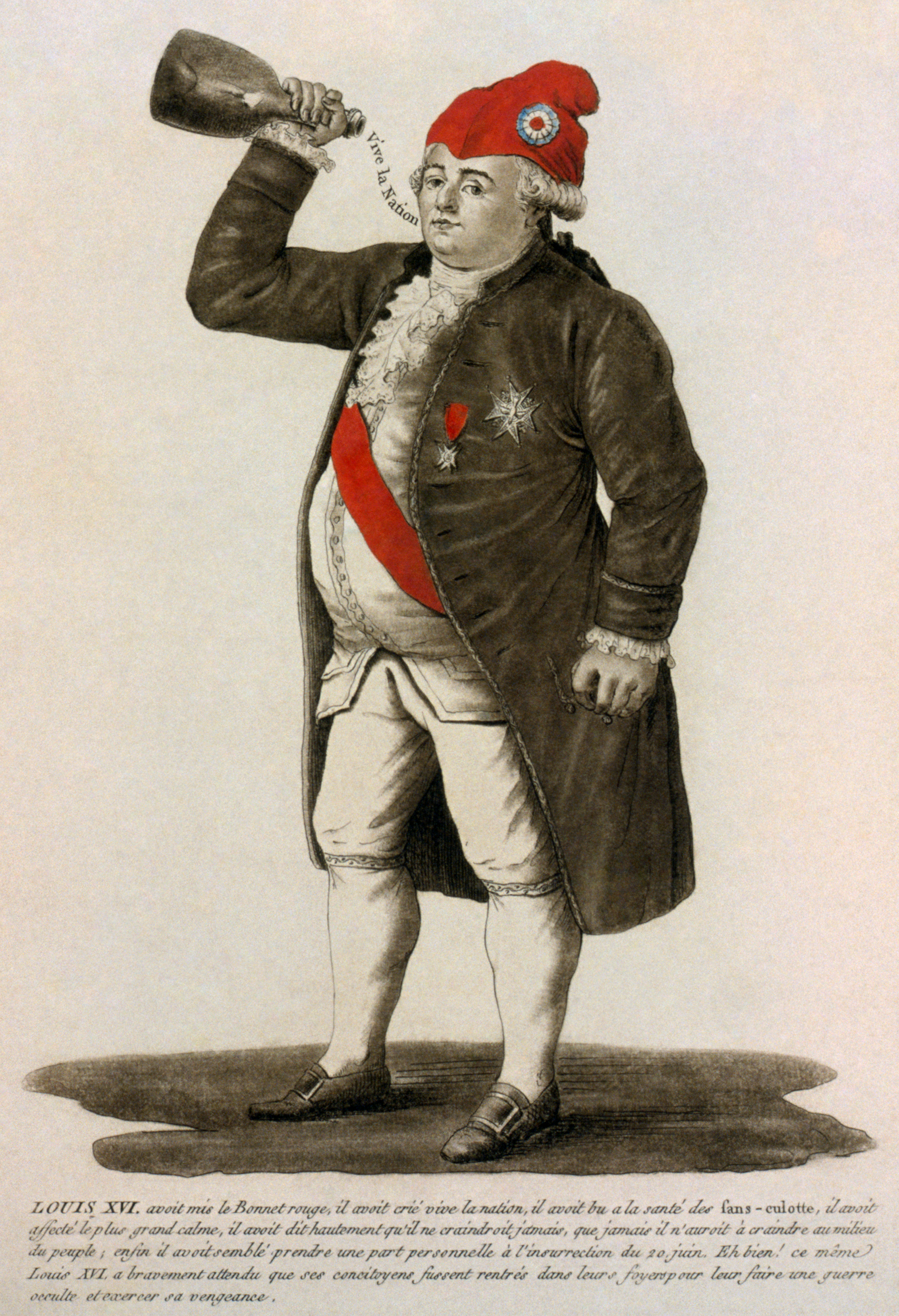
Tinted etching of Louis XVI, 1792, with a Phrygian cap.

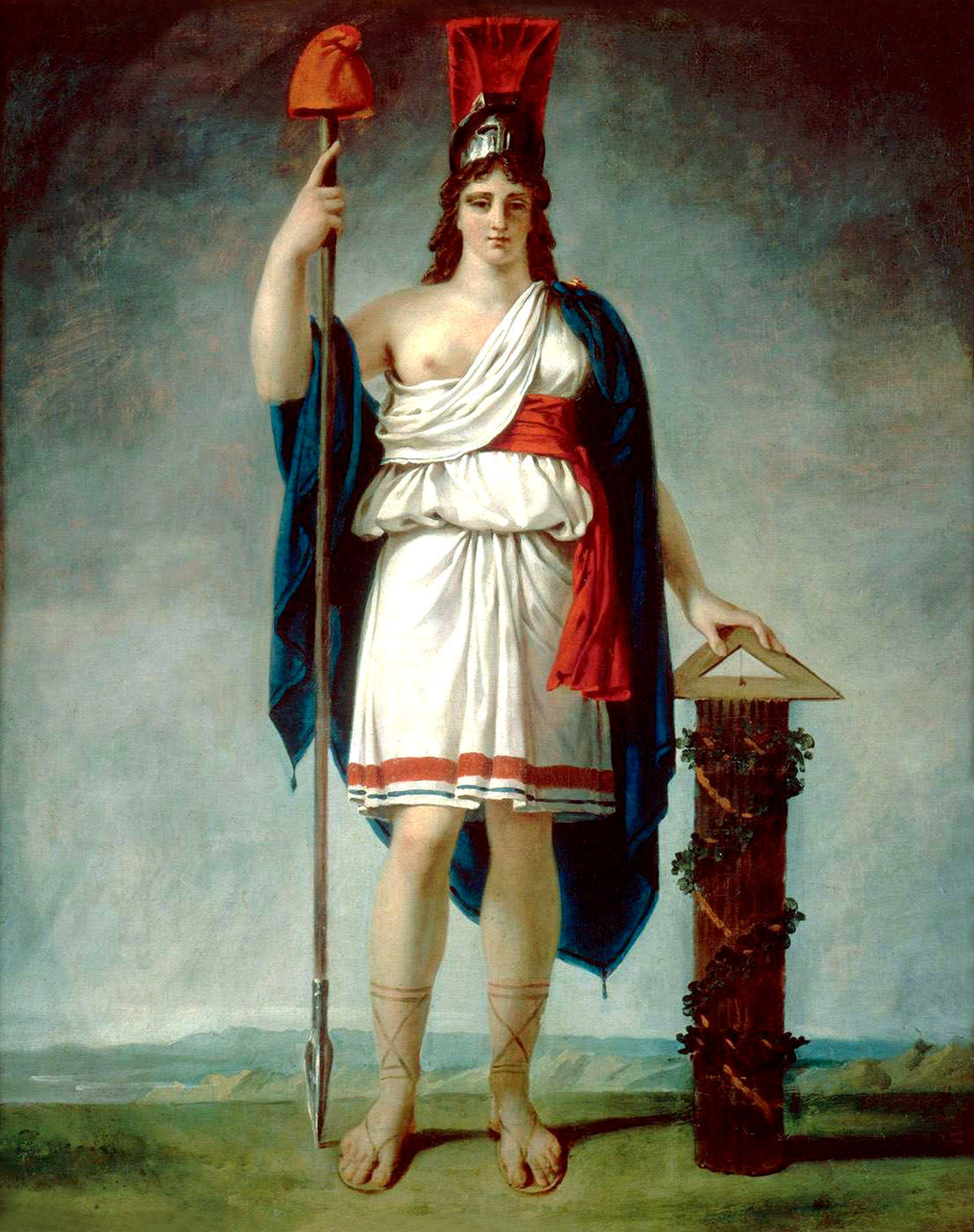
Allegory of the first French Republic by Antoine-Jean Gros, depicting a Phrygian cap.

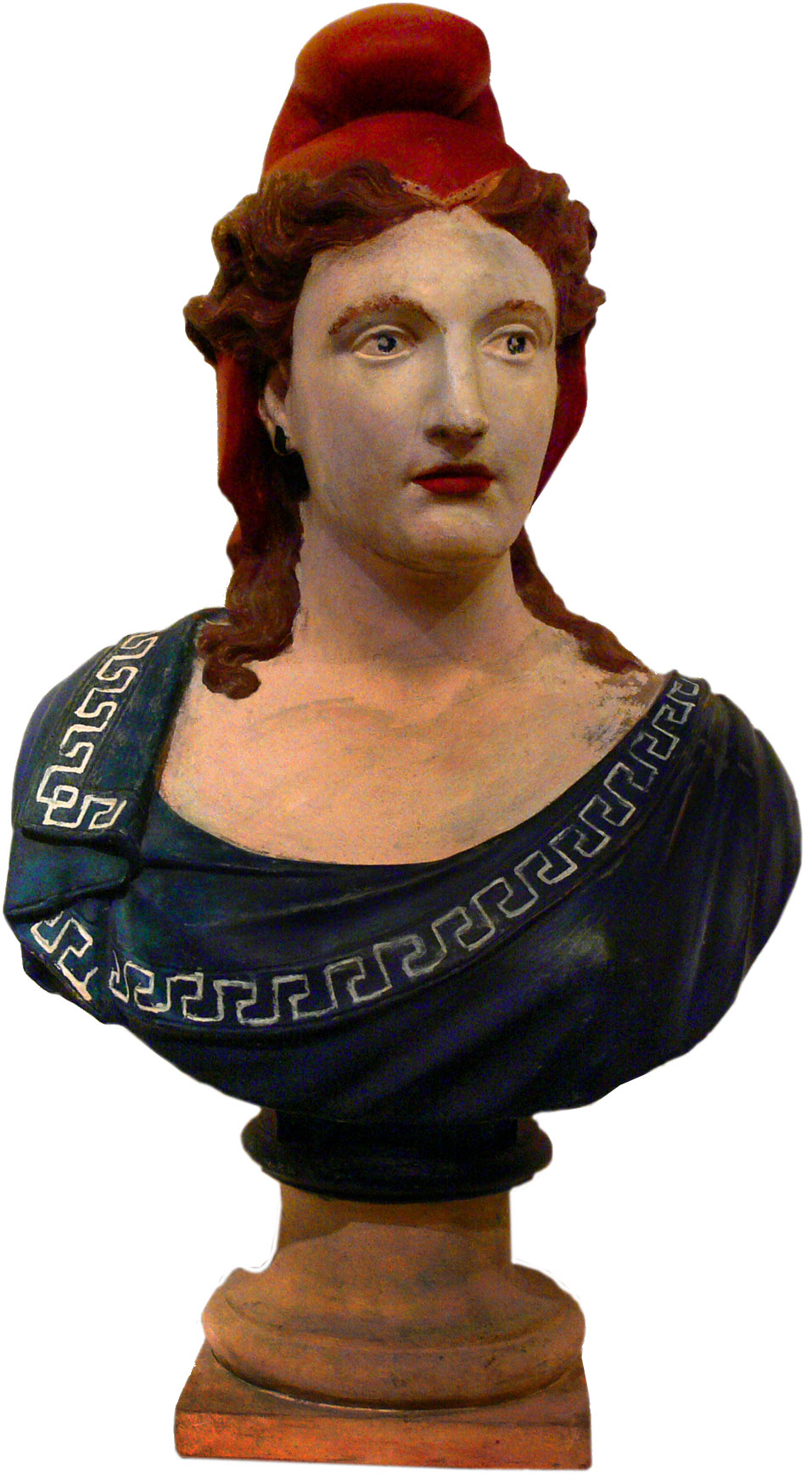
Anonymous bust of Marianne, with the Phrygian cap (Palais du Luxembourg, Paris).

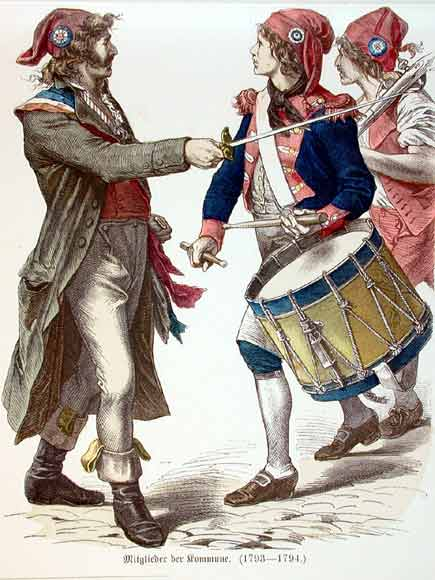
French revolutionaries wearing bonnets rouges and tricolor cockades.

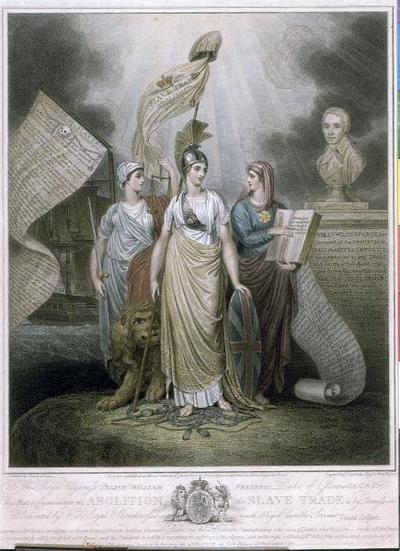
A mezzotint commemorating the passage of the Slave Trade Act 1807 by the British government, which abolished the slave trade. Britannia is seen with a Phrygian cap at the top a pole she wields.

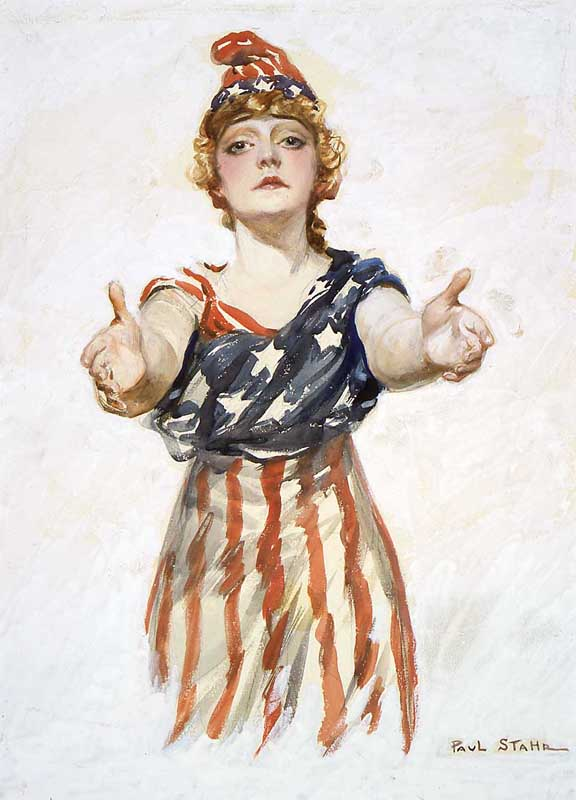
Columbia wearing a Phrygian cap, personification of the United States (World War I patriotic poster).

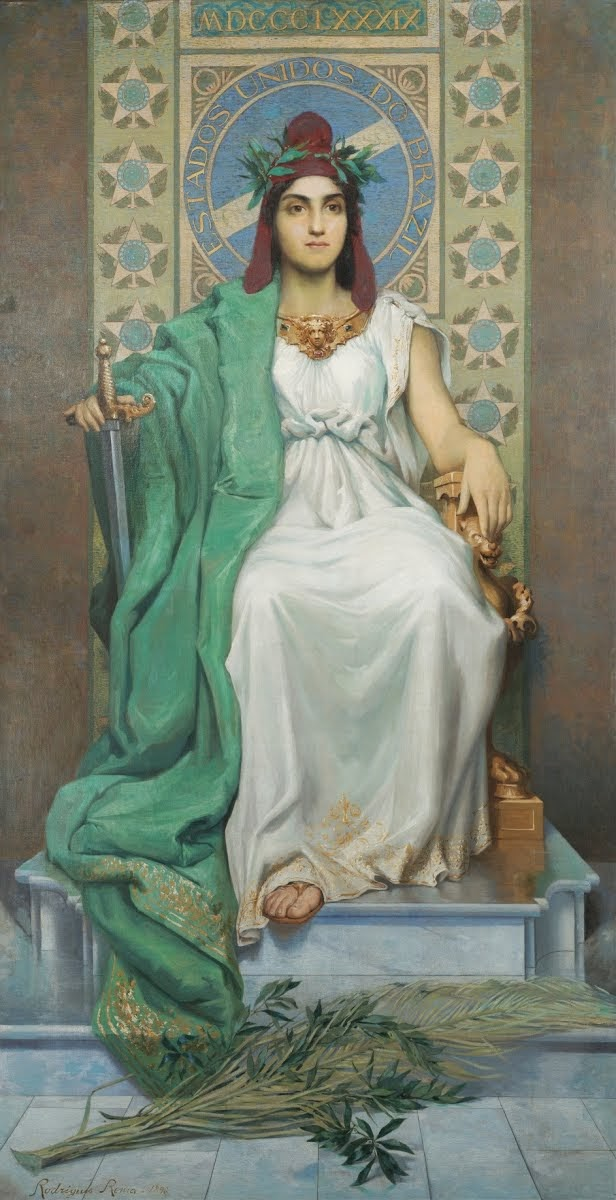
Efígie da República (Effigy of the Republic), national personification of Brazil, wearing a Phrygian cap.

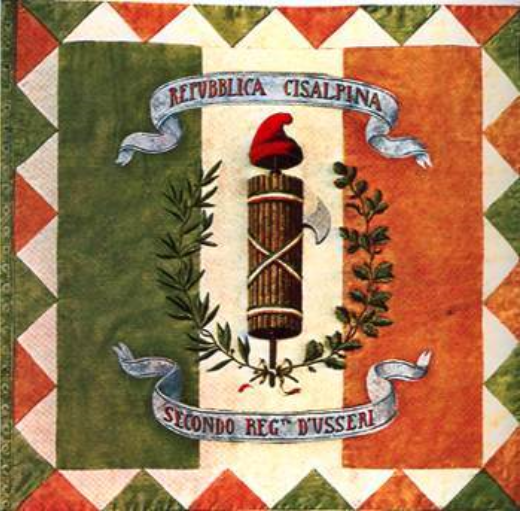
Flag of the Second Regiment of the Usseri, Cisalpine Republic, 1798

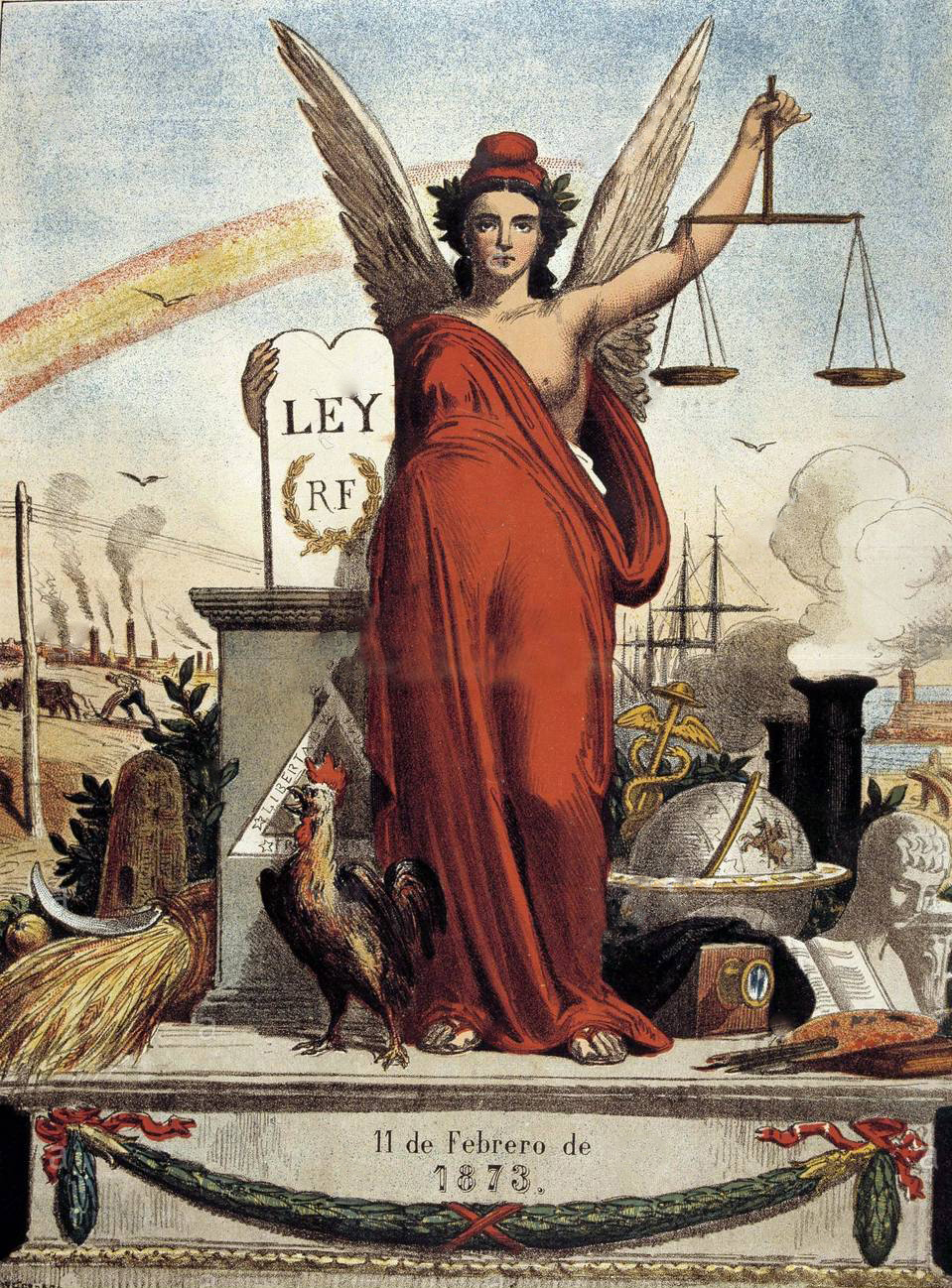
Allegory of the Spanish Republic wearing the Phrygian cap, 1873

The Seal of Iowa showing a red liberty cap at the top of the soldier's flagstaff. The 1847 written description did not specify that the soldier has to wear the cap; thus he is commonly depicted with a Civil War-era cavalry hat.

The Seal of Hawaii showing goddess Liberty wears a red liberty cap.

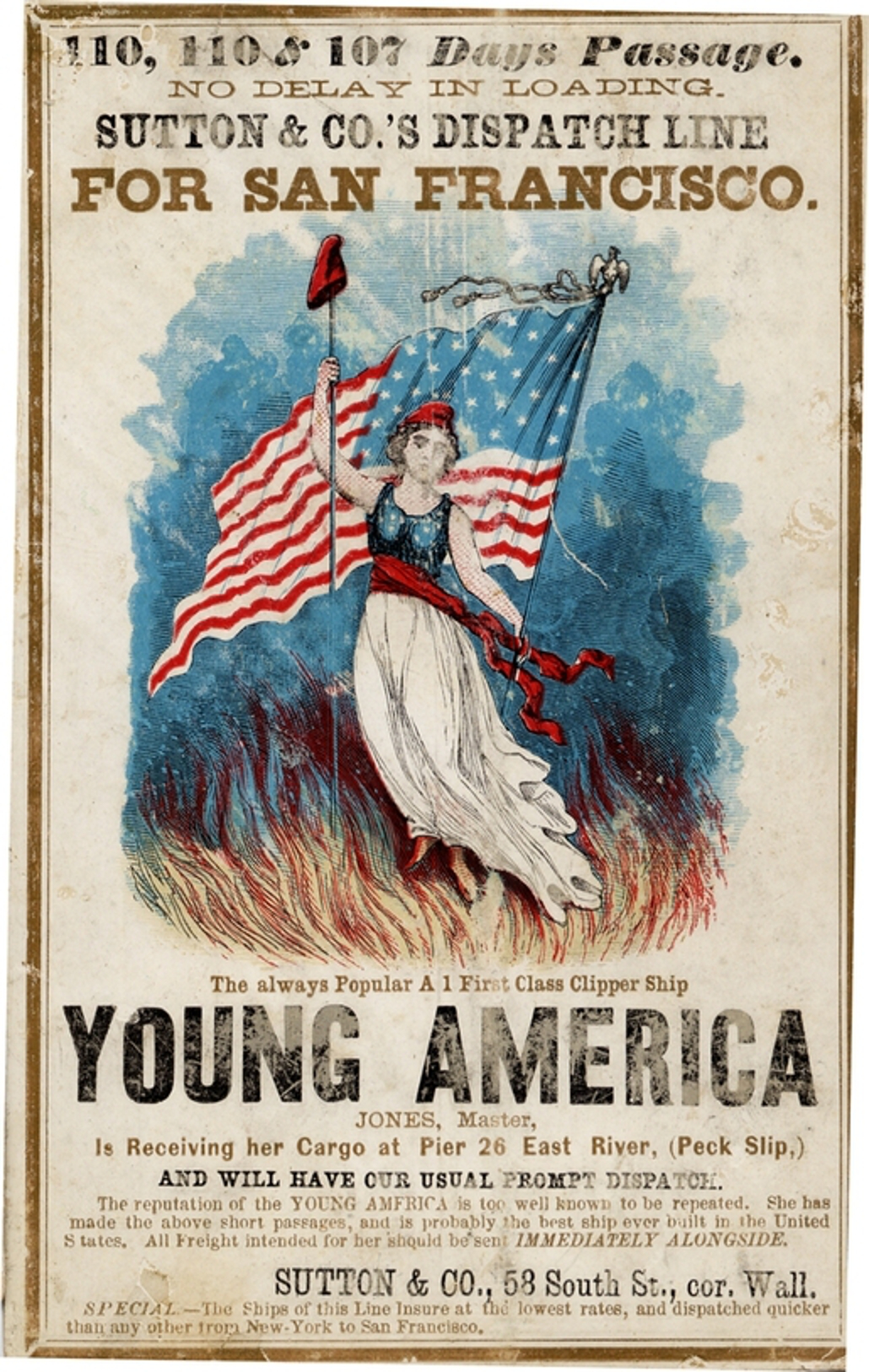
Columbia holding up a Phrygian cap on an advertisement for the clipper ship Young America

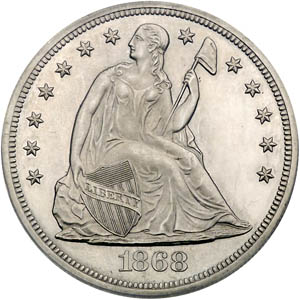
Seated Liberty dollar, with Phrygian cap on a pole (1868)

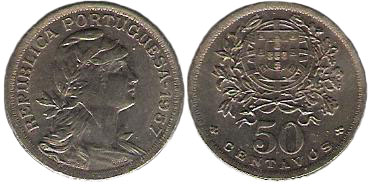
Allegory of the Portuguese Republic on a coin, wearing the Phrygian cap

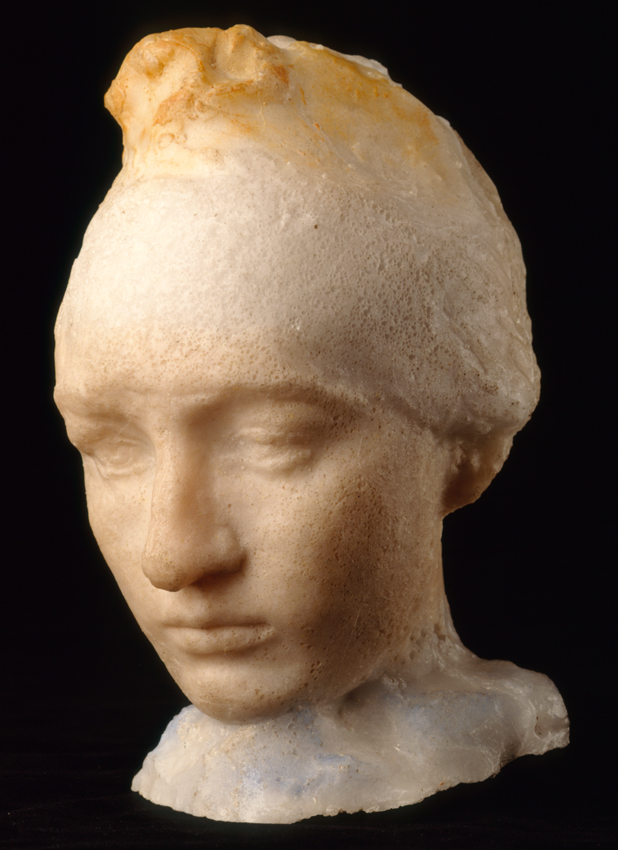
Head of Camille Claudel, 1884, by Auguste Rodin, portrays sculptor Camille Claudel wearing a Phrygian cap.

Flag raised by Robert Emmet during the Irish rebellion of 1803

Old flag of the Argentine Confederation, that used four Phrygian caps: one in each corner.

Reverse side of Coat of arms of Paraguay

Coat of arms of Cuba.

Coat of arms of Argentina

Coat of arms of El Salvador

Coat of arms of Nicaragua

Coat of arms of Santa Catarina State, Brazil

Coat of arms of Rio de Janeiro, with the Phrygian cap attached to an armillary sphere

Coat of arms of Acre State, Brazil

Coat of arms of Maceió, Brazil

Coat of arms of Nueva Esparta, Venezuela

Coat of arms of Guárico, Venezuela

Logo of the Swiss Party of Labour, a Phrygian cap with a Swiss cross on it.

== In popular culture ==
In the Belgian comic franchise The Smurfs, the eponymous Smurfs are typically depicted wearing Phrygian-like caps.

The official mascots of the Paris 2024 Olympic and Paralympic Games, named the Phryges, were based on the cap.

== See also ==
- Balaclava (clothing)
- Barretina
- Bashlyk
- Beret
- Bonnet (headgear)
- Cap
- Caubeen
- Chullo
- Kolah namadi
- Kurkhars, national female headdress of the Caucasian Ingush people
- List of hat styles
- List of headgear
- Monmouth cap
- Liberty cap – a species of fungus in the family Hymenogastraceae, the cap of which bears a close resemblance to the Phrygian cap and from which it takes its name
- Pointed hat of Iron Age Eurasia
