= Coat of arms of Buenos Aires Province =

Coat of arms of Buenos Aires Province

The coat of arms of Buenos Aires Province was declared official on the 19th of October 1935, by Law 4351. It is similar to the arms of Argentina and has its origins in the seal of the General Constituent Assembly of 1813.

In 1813 the Assembly designed the shield that would replace the Spanish. The Nation and the Province retained that of the Assembly. In 1880 the city of Buenos Aires became the capital of the Republic, and the province continued to use the shield of the Assembly.

In 1935 ornaments were determined officially, similar to those of the national shield. There are some differences:

- The sun's rays are straight.
- The branches are not equal, laurel on the left and olive tree on the right, symbols of victory and peace.
- The blue and white ribbon that binds the branches is different.
