= Siege of Yorktown =

1781 siege of the American Revolutionary War

- Part of the American Revolutionary War
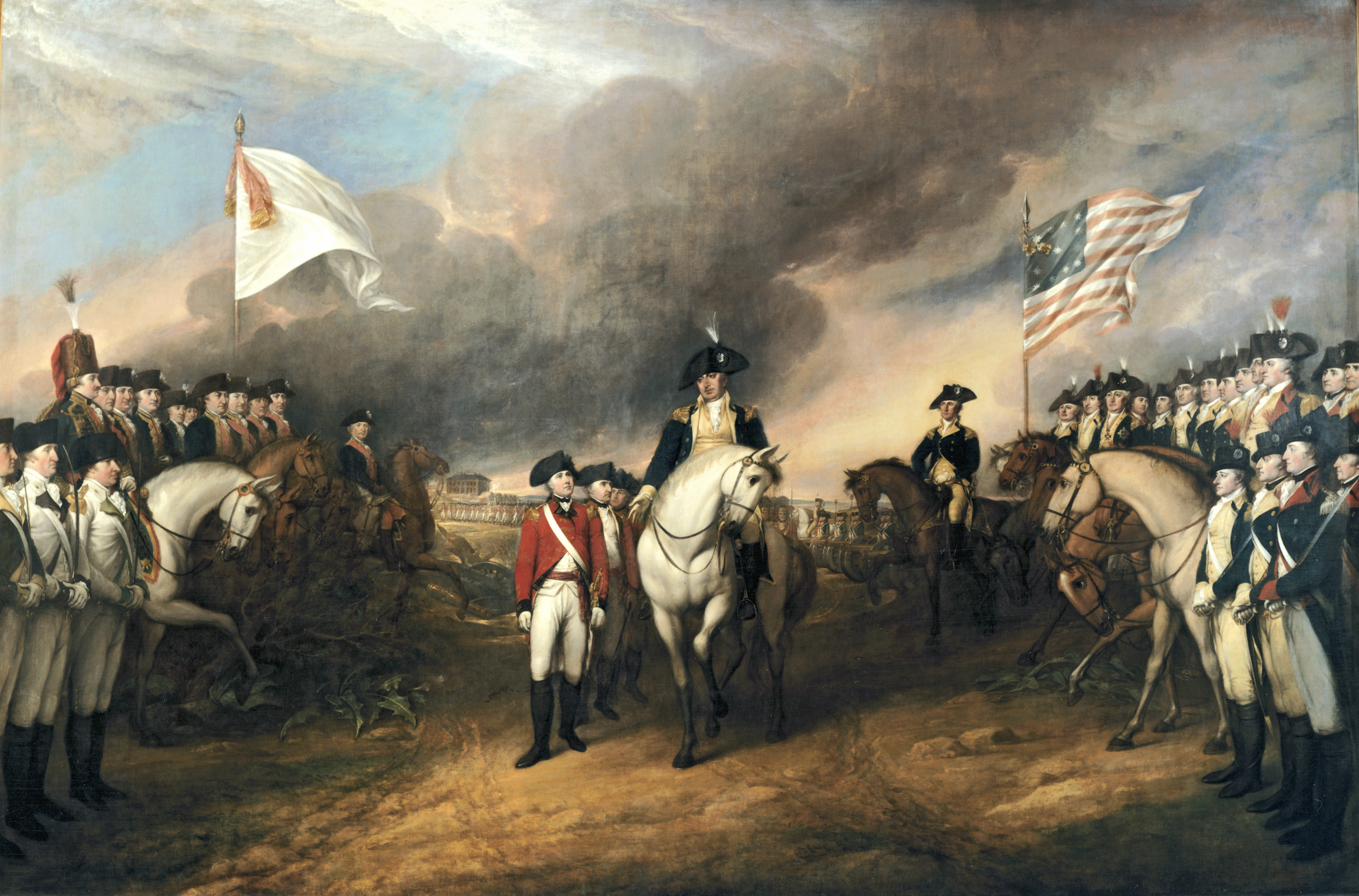
- Surrender of Lord Cornwallis; John Trumbull, 1820
Date	September 28 – October 19, 1781 (3 weeks)
Location	Gloucester and Yorktown, Virginia 37°13′51″N 76°30′09″W
Result	Franco-American victory

Belligerents
United States; France	Great Britain: Loyalists; Hesse-Kassel (Note: Following the German spelling reform of the early 20th century, the town of Cassel became Kassel, long after the dissolution of Hesse-Kassel itself.); Ansbach-Bayreuth

Commanders and leaders
George Washington; Benjamin Lincoln; Henry Knox; Alexander Hamilton; Friedrich von Steuben; Thomas Nelson; Moses Hazen; Henry Dearborn; Marquis de Lafayette; Comte de Rochambeau; Comte d'Aboville; Marquis de Choisy; Comte de Grasse; Comté de Deux-Ponts	Charles Cornwallis (surrendered); Charles O'Hara (surrendered); Banastre Tarleton (WIA) (surrendered); Robert Abercromby (surrendered); Thomas Dundas (surrendered); Thomas Symonds (surrendered); Matthias von Fuchs (surrendered); August von Salzburg (surrendered); Johann von Seybothen (surrendered)

Strength
Americans: 8,000–9,000 men; • 5,900 regular troops; • 3,100 militia (not engaged); French: 10,800 men and 29 warships; Total: 19,800 (fewer engaged)	British: 5,000; German: fewer than 3,000; Total: 8,000–9,000

Casualties and losses
88 killed 301 wounded Total: 389	142–309 killed 326–595 wounded prisoners 7,416–7,685 captured Total: 7,884–8,589
- Location within Virginia

The Siege of Yorktown, also known as the Battle of Yorktown and the surrender at Yorktown, took place in 1781 and was the final major land engagement of the American Revolutionary War. It was won decisively by the Continental Army, led by George Washington, with support from the Marquis de Lafayette and French Army troops, led by Comte de Rochambeau, and a French Navy force commanded by the Comte de Grasse, making the British Army commanded by British Lieutenant General Charles Cornwallis surrender.

The French and American armies united north of New York City in the summer of 1781. Following the arrival of dispatches from France that included the possibility of support from the French West Indies fleet of the Comte de Grasse, disagreements arose between Washington and Rochambeau on whether to ask de Grasse for assistance in besieging New York or in military operations against a British army in Virginia. On the advice of Rochambeau, de Grasse informed them of his intent to sail to the Chesapeake Bay, where Cornwallis had taken command of the British army. Cornwallis, at first given confusing orders by his superior officer, Henry Clinton, was eventually ordered to build a defensible deep-water port, which he began to do at Yorktown. Cornwallis's movements in Virginia were shadowed by a Continental Army force led by Gilbert du Motier, Marquis de Lafayette.

When word of de Grasse's decision to engage the British navy at the Chesapeake Bay arrived in New York, the American and French armies began moving south toward Virginia, engaging in deception tactics to lead the British to believe a siege of New York was planned. De Grasse sailed from the West Indies and arrived at Chesapeake Bay at the end of August, bringing additional troops and creating a naval blockade of Yorktown. In the beginning of September, he defeated a British fleet led by Sir Thomas Graves, which was dispatched to relieve Cornwallis at the Battle of the Chesapeake. As a result of this victory, de Grasse blocked any reinforcement or escape by sea for Cornwallis and also disembarked the heavy siege guns required by the allied land forces. Washington and Rochambeau arrived at Yorktown on September 28, 1781. Washington moved the army closer to the British defenses on September 29. The American and French army and naval forces had completely surrounded Cornwallis.

After initial preparations, the Americans and French built their first parallel and began the bombardment. With the British defense weakened, on October 14, 1781, Washington commanded two columns to attack the last major remaining British outer defenses. A French column under Vicomte de Deux-Ponts took Redoubt No. 9 and an American column under Lieutenant Colonel Alexander Hamilton took Redoubt No. 10. With these defenses, the allies were able to finish their second parallel. With the Franco-American artillery closer and its bombardment more intense than ever, the British position began to deteriorate rapidly. Cornwallis asked for capitulation terms on October 17. After two days of negotiation, the surrender ceremony occurred on October 19; Cornwallis was absent from the ceremony. With the capture of more than 7,000 British soldiers, negotiations between the United States and Great Britain began, resulting in the Treaty of Paris of 1783. (Note: Hostilities continued at sea, mainly between British and Franco-Spanish fleets in the Caribbean, culminating in the British victory in the Battle of the Saintes the following year.)

== Prelude ==
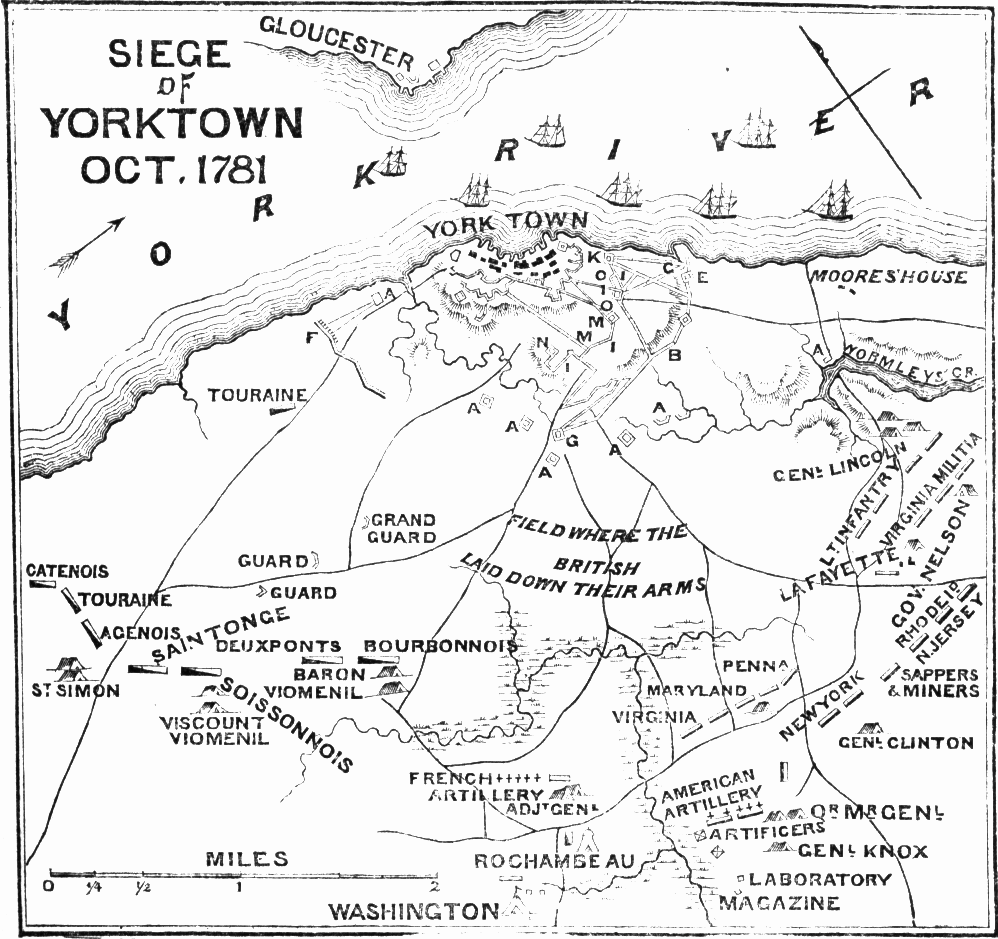
An illustrated plan of the Battle of Yorktown drawn in 1875

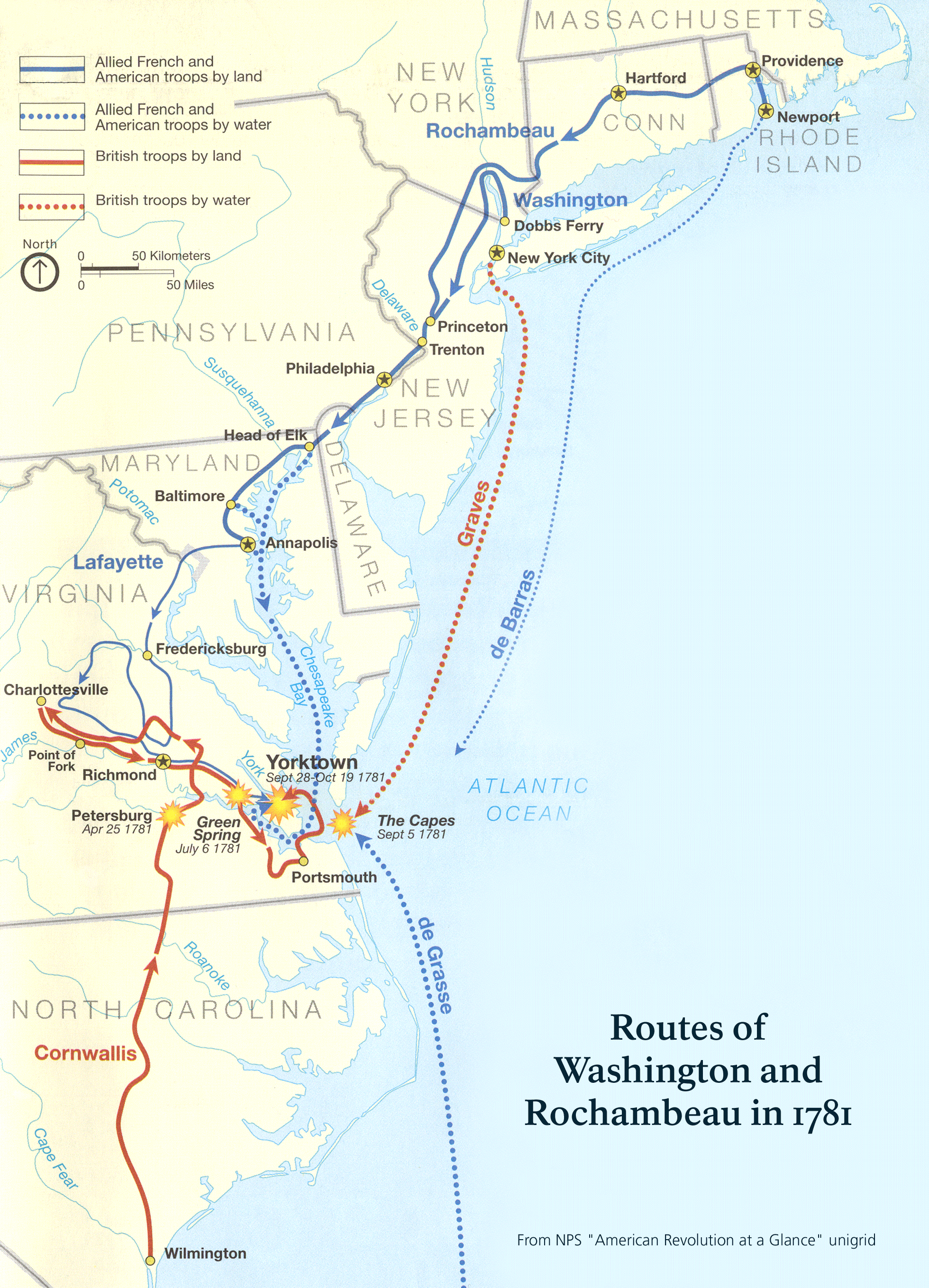
National Park Service map of the Washington-Rochambeau Revolutionary Route

=== Franco-American cooperation ===
On December 20, 1780, Benedict Arnold sailed from New York with 1,500 British troops to Portsmouth, Virginia. He first raided Richmond, defeating the defending militia, from January 5–7 before falling back to Portsmouth. Admiral Destouches, who arrived in Newport, Rhode Island, in July 1780 with a fleet transporting 5,500 soldiers, was encouraged by Washington and French Lieutenant General Rochambeau to move his fleet south, and launch a joint land-naval attack on Arnold's troops. The Marquis de Lafayette was sent south with 1,200 men to help with the assault. However, Destouches was reluctant to dispatch many ships, and in February sent only three. After they proved ineffective, he took a larger force of eight ships in March 1781, and fought a tactically inconclusive battle with the British fleet of Marriot Arbuthnot at the mouth of the Chesapeake Bay. Destouches withdrew due to the damage sustained to his fleet, leaving Arbuthnot and the British fleet in control of the bay's mouth.

On March 26, Arnold was joined by 2,300 troops under command of Major General William Phillips, who took command of the combined forces. Phillips resumed raiding, defeating the militia at Blandford, then burning the tobacco warehouses at Petersburg on April 25. Richmond was about to suffer the same fate, but Lafayette arrived. The British, not wanting to engage in a major battle, withdrew to Petersburg on May 10.

On May 20, Charles Cornwallis arrived at Petersburg with 1,500 men after suffering heavy casualties at the Battle of Guilford Courthouse. He immediately assumed command, as Phillips had recently died of a fever. Cornwallis had not received permission to abandon the Carolinas from his superior, Henry Clinton, but he believed that Virginia would be easier to capture, feeling that it would approve of an invading British army.

With the arrival of Cornwallis and more reinforcements from New York, the British Army numbered 7,200 men. Cornwallis wanted to push Lafayette, whose force now numbered 3,000 men with the arrival of Virginia militia. On May 24, he set out after Lafayette, who withdrew from Richmond and linked forces with those under the command of Baron von Steuben and Anthony Wayne. Cornwallis did not pursue Lafayette. Instead, he sent raiders into central Virginia, where they attacked depots and supply convoys, before being recalled on June 20. Cornwallis then headed for Williamsburg, and Lafayette's force of now 4,500 followed him. General Clinton, in a confusing series of orders, ordered Cornwallis first to Portsmouth and then Yorktown, where he was instructed to build fortifications for a deep water port.

An expedition of 5,500 French troops under Comte de Rochambeau arrived in Newport, Rhode Island, by sea on July 10, 1780. On July 6, 1781, the French and American armies met at White Plains, north of New York City. Although Rochambeau had almost 40 years of warfare experience, he never challenged Washington's authority, telling Washington he had come to serve, not to command.

Washington and Rochambeau discussed where to launch a joint attack. Washington believed an attack on New York was the best option, since the Americans and French now outnumbered the British defenders 3 to 1. Rochambeau disagreed, arguing the fleet in the West Indies under Admiral de Grasse was going to sail to the American coast, where easier options than attacking New York could be attempted.

In early July, Washington suggested an attack be made at the northern part of Manhattan Island, but his officers and Rochambeau all disagreed. Washington continued to probe the New York area until August 14, when he received a letter from de Grasse stating he was headed for Virginia with 28 warships and 3,200 soldiers, but could only remain there until October 14. De Grasse encouraged Washington to move south so they could launch a joint operation. Washington abandoned his plan to take New York, and began to prepare his army for the march south to Virginia.

=== March to Yorktown ===
On August 19, using what is now known as the Washington-Rochambeau Revolutionary Route, Washington and Rochambeau began what was called the "celebrated march" to Yorktown. 7,000 soldiers (4,000 French and 3,000 American) began the march in Newport, Rhode Island, while the rest remained behind to protect the Hudson Valley. Washington wanted to maintain complete secrecy of their destination. To ensure this, he sent out fake dispatches that reached Clinton revealing that the Franco-American army was going to launch an attack on New York City, and that Cornwallis was not in danger.

Between September 2 and September 4, the French and American armies marched through Philadelphia, where Washington's Continental Army troops announced they would not leave the Province of Maryland until they received one month's pay in coin, rather than in the worthless Continental paper currency. "Count de Rochambeau very readily agreed at Chester to supply at the Head of Elk twenty thousand hard dollars", half of his supply of gold Spanish coins, representing the last time Continental Army troops were paid. The payment strengthened French and American relations. On September 5, Washington learned of the arrival of de Grasse's fleet off the Virginia Capes. De Grasse debarked his French troops to join Lafayette, and then sent his empty transports to pick up the American troops. Washington made a visit to his home, Mount Vernon, on his way to Yorktown.

=== Battle of the Chesapeake ===
In August, Admiral Sir Thomas Graves led a fleet from the Province of New York to attack de Grasse's fleet. Graves did not realize how large the French fleet was, and neither did Cornwallis. The British fleet was defeated by de Grasse's fleet in the Battle of the Chesapeake on September 5, and forced to fall back to New York. On September 14, Washington arrived in Williamsburg, Virginia.

== Siege ==
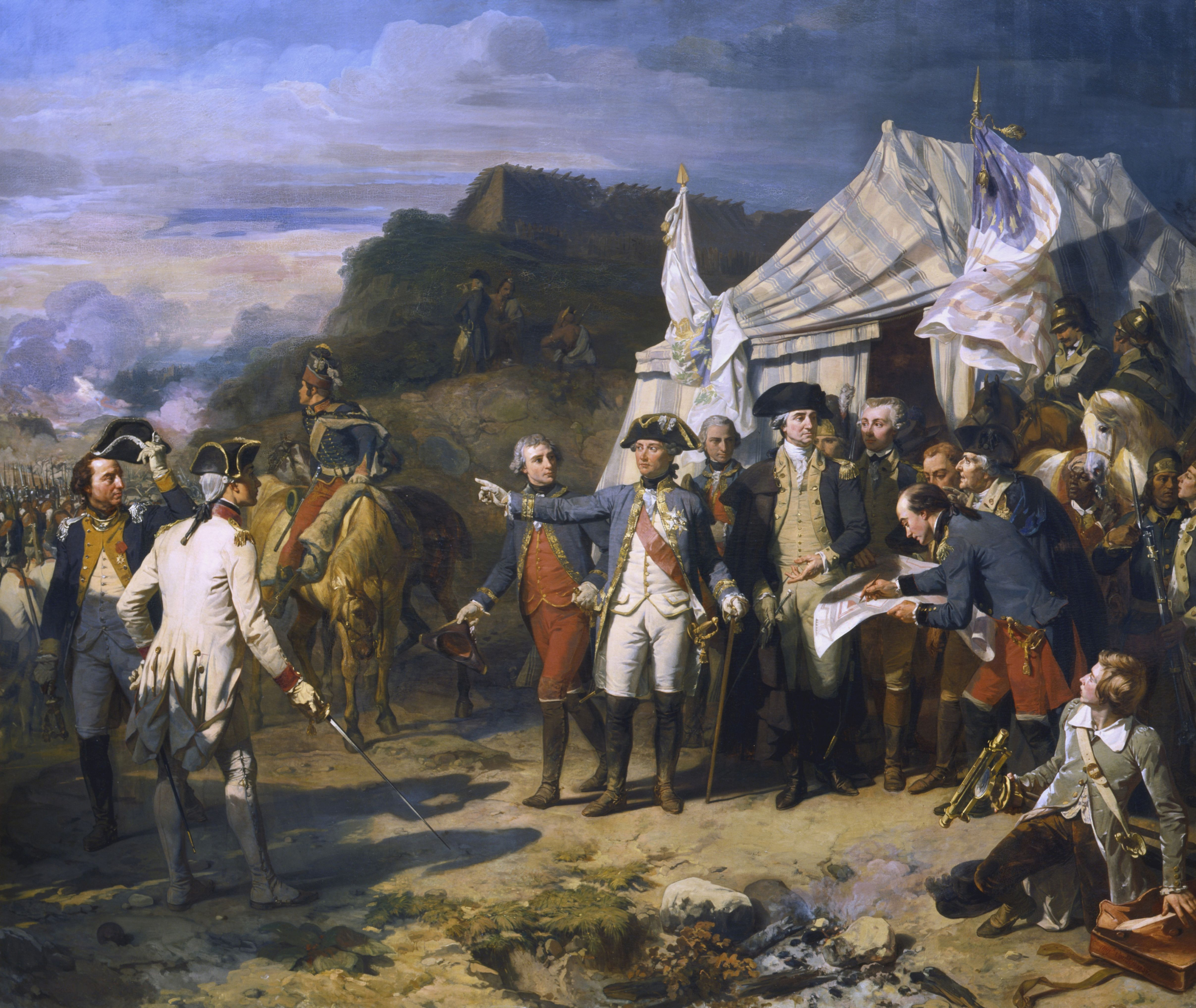
Siège de Yorktown, a c. 1836 painting by Auguste Couder (Note: Conserved in the Galerie des Batailles, Château de Versailles, France. A copy is displayed at the Colonial National Historical Park Visitors' Center in Yorktown.) Rochambeau (center, gesturing), Washington (center R), Marquis de La Fayette (behind Washington, R), Marquis de Saint Simon (behind Washington, L), Duke of Lauzun (L, mounted) and Comte de Ménonville (R of Washington).

=== Initial movements ===
On September 26, transports with artillery, siege tools, and some French infantry and shock troops from Head of Elk, the northern end of the Chesapeake Bay, arrived, giving Washington command of an army of 7,800 Frenchmen, 3,100 militia, and 8,000 Continentals. Early on September 28, Washington led the army out of Williamsburg to surround Yorktown. The French took the positions on the left while the Americans took the position of honor on the right. Cornwallis had a chain of seven redoubts and batteries linked by earthworks along with batteries that covered the narrows of the York River at Gloucester Point. That day, Washington reconnoitered the British defenses, and decided that they could be bombarded into submission. The Americans and the French spent the night of the 28th sleeping out in the open, while work parties built bridges over the marsh. Some of the American soldiers hunted down wild hogs to eat.

On September 29, Washington moved the army closer to Yorktown, and British gunners opened fire on the infantry. Throughout the day, several British cannon fired on the Americans, but there were few casualties. Fire was also exchanged between American riflemen and Hessian Jägers.

Cornwallis pulled back from all of his outer defenses, except for the Fusilier's redoubt on the west side of the town and redoubts 9 and 10 in the east. Cornwallis had his forces occupy the earthworks immediately surrounding the town because he had received a letter from Clinton that promised relief force of 5,000 men within a week and he wished to tighten his lines. The Americans and the French occupied the abandoned defenses and began to establish their batteries there. With the British outer defenses in their hands, allied engineers began to lay out positions for the artillery. The men improved their works and deepened their trenches. The British also worked on improving their defenses.

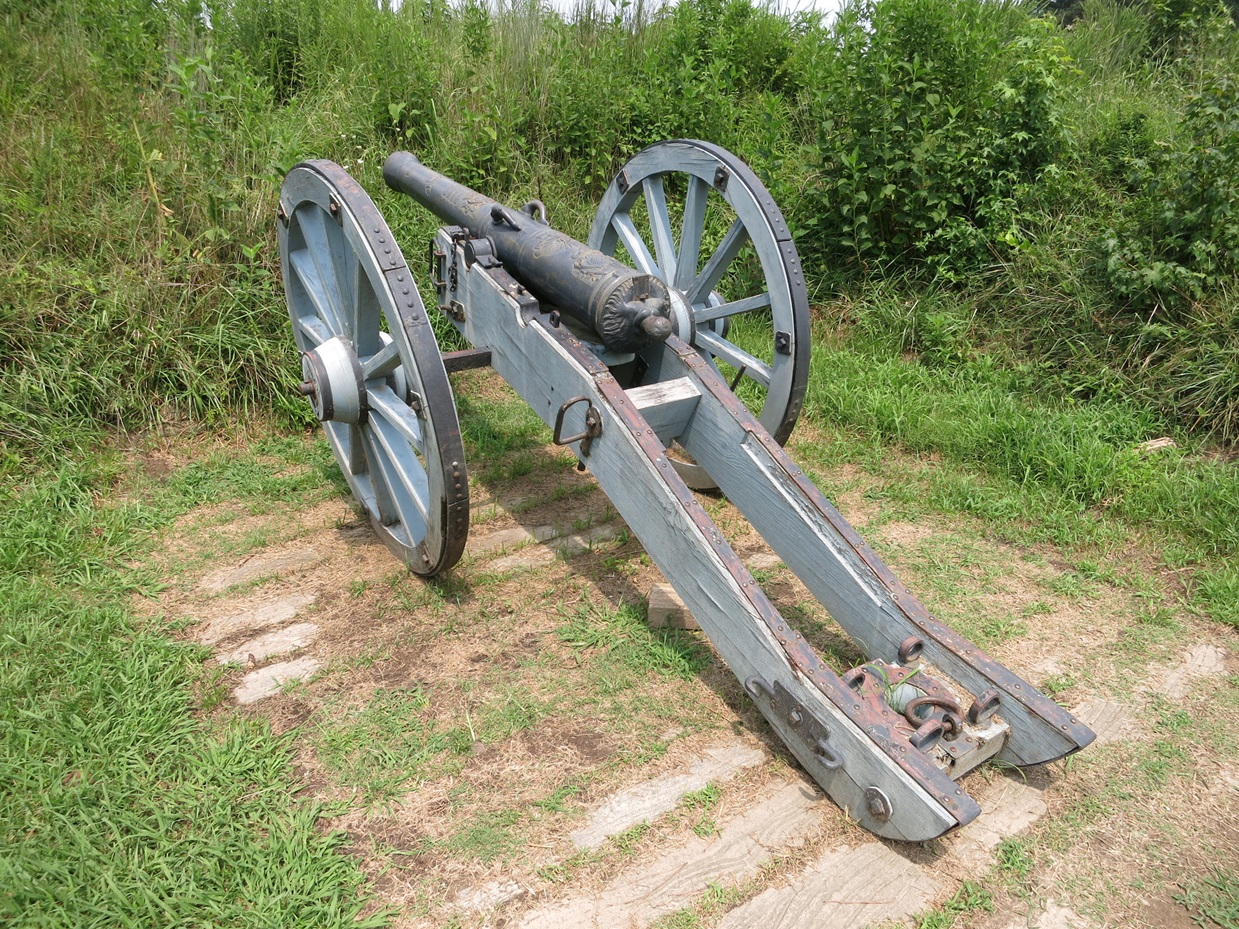
Vallière 4-pounder, French Grand Battery, Yorktown, Virginia

On September 30, the French attacked the British Fusiliers redoubt. The skirmish lasted two hours, in which the French were repulsed, suffering several casualties. On October 1, the allies learned from British deserters that, to preserve their food, the British had slaughtered hundreds of horses and thrown them on the beach. In the American camp, thousands of trees were cut down to provide wood for earthworks. Preparations for the parallel also began.

As the allies began to put their artillery into place, the British kept up a steady fire to disrupt them. British fire increased on the 2nd and the allies suffered moderate casualties. General Washington continued to make visits to the front, despite concern shown by several of his officers over the increasing enemy fire. On the night of October 2, the British opened a storm of fire to cover up the movement of the British cavalry to Gloucester where they were to escort infantrymen on a foraging party. On the 3rd, the foraging party, led by Banastre Tarleton, went out but collided with Lauzun's Legion, and John Mercer's Virginia militia, led by the Marquis de Choisy. The British cavalry quickly retreated behind their defensive lines, losing 50 men.

By October 5, Washington was almost ready to open the first parallel. That night the sappers and miners worked, putting strips of pine on the wet sand to mark the path of the trenches. The main/ initial movements of this battle were walking and riding horses.

=== Bombardment ===
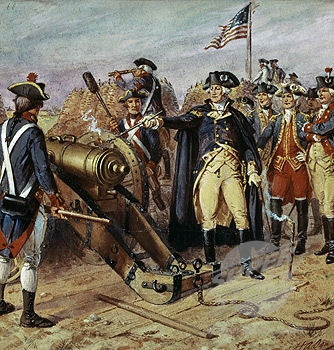
Washington firing the first gun

After nightfall on October 6, troops moved out in stormy weather to dig the first parallel. The heavily overcast sky negated the waning full moon and shielded the massive digging operation from the eyes of British sentries. (Note: The moon had been full on October 2.) Washington ceremoniously struck several blows with his pickaxe to begin the trench. The trench was to be 2,000 yd (1,800 m) long, running from the head of Yorktown to the York River. Half of the trench was to be commanded by the French, the other half by the Americans. On the northernmost end of the French line, a support trench was dug so that they could bombard the British ships in the river. The French were ordered to distract the British with a false attack, but the British were told of the plan by a French deserter and the British artillery fire turned on the French from the Fusiliers redoubt.

On October 7, the British saw the new allied trench just out of musket-range. Over the next two days, the allies completed the gun placements and dragged the artillery into line. The British fire began to weaken when they saw the large number of guns the allies had.

By October 9, all of the French and American guns were in place. Among the American guns there were three twenty-four pounders, three eighteen pounders, two eight-inch (203 mm) howitzers and six mortars, totaling fourteen guns. At 3:00 pm, the French guns opened the barrage and drove the British frigate HMS Guadeloupe across the York River, where she was scuttled to prevent capture. At 5:00 pm, the Americans opened fire. Washington fired the first gun; legend has it that this shot smashed into a table where British officers were eating. The Franco-American guns began to tear apart the British defenses. Washington ordered that the guns fire all night so that the British could not make repairs. All of the British guns on the left were soon silenced. The British soldiers began to pitch their tents in their trenches and soldiers began to desert in large numbers. Some British ships were also damaged by cannonballs that flew across the town into the harbor.

On October 10, the Americans spotted a large house in Yorktown. Believing that Cornwallis might be stationed there, they aimed at it and quickly destroyed it. Cornwallis sank more than a dozen of his ships in the harbor. The French began to fire at the British ships and scored a hit on the British HMS Charon, which caught fire, and in turn set two or three other ships on fire. Cornwallis received word from Clinton that the British fleet was to depart on October 12, however Cornwallis responded by saying that he would not be able to hold out for long.

On the night of October 11, Washington ordered that the Americans dig a second parallel. It was 400 yd (370 m) closer to the British lines, but could not be extended to the river because the British number 9 and 10 redoubts were in the way. During the night, the British fire continued to land in the old line; Cornwallis did not suspect that a new parallel was being dug. By morning of the 12th, the allied troops were in position on the new line.

=== Assault on the redoubts ===
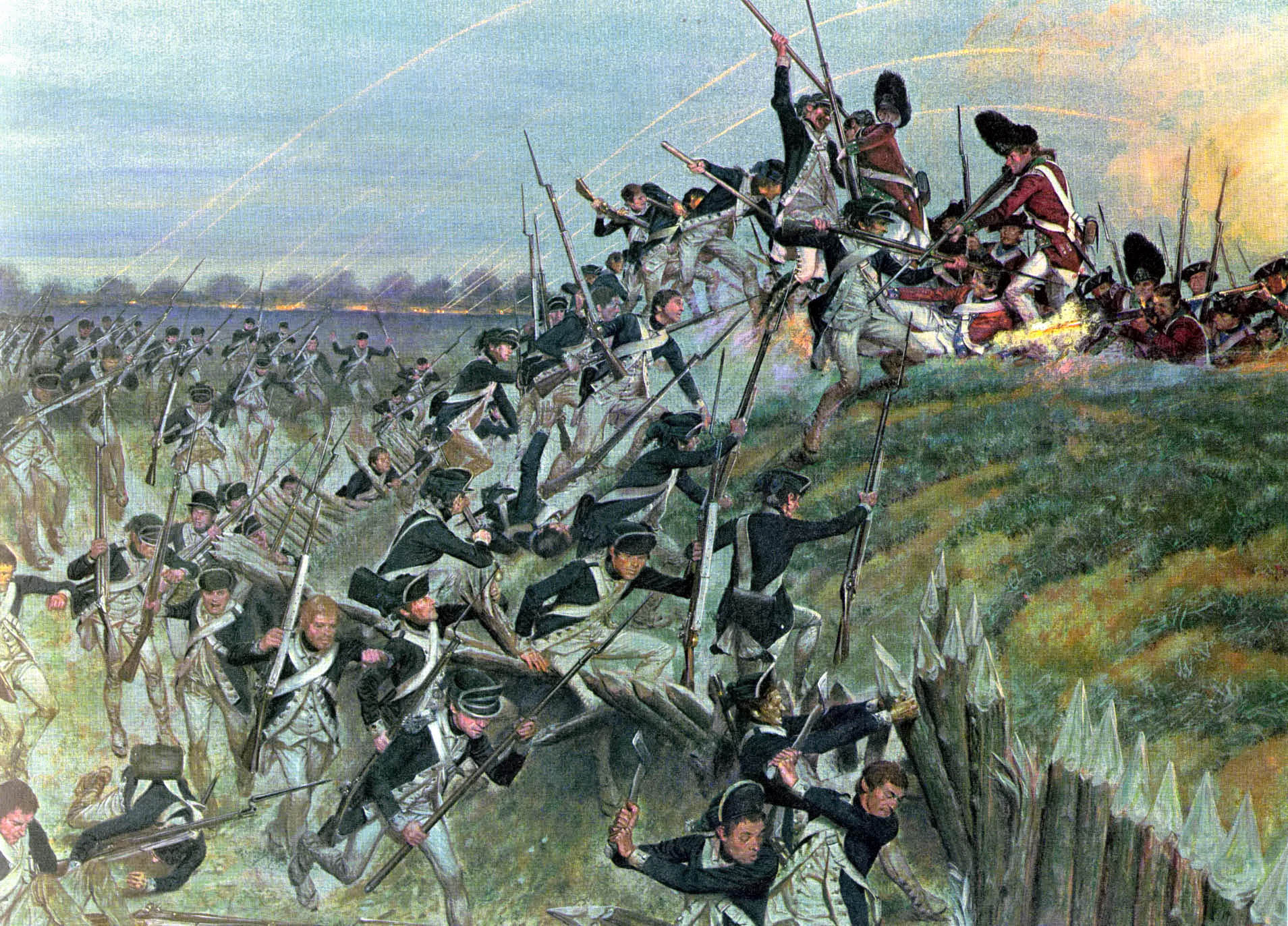
Storming of Redoubt No. 10

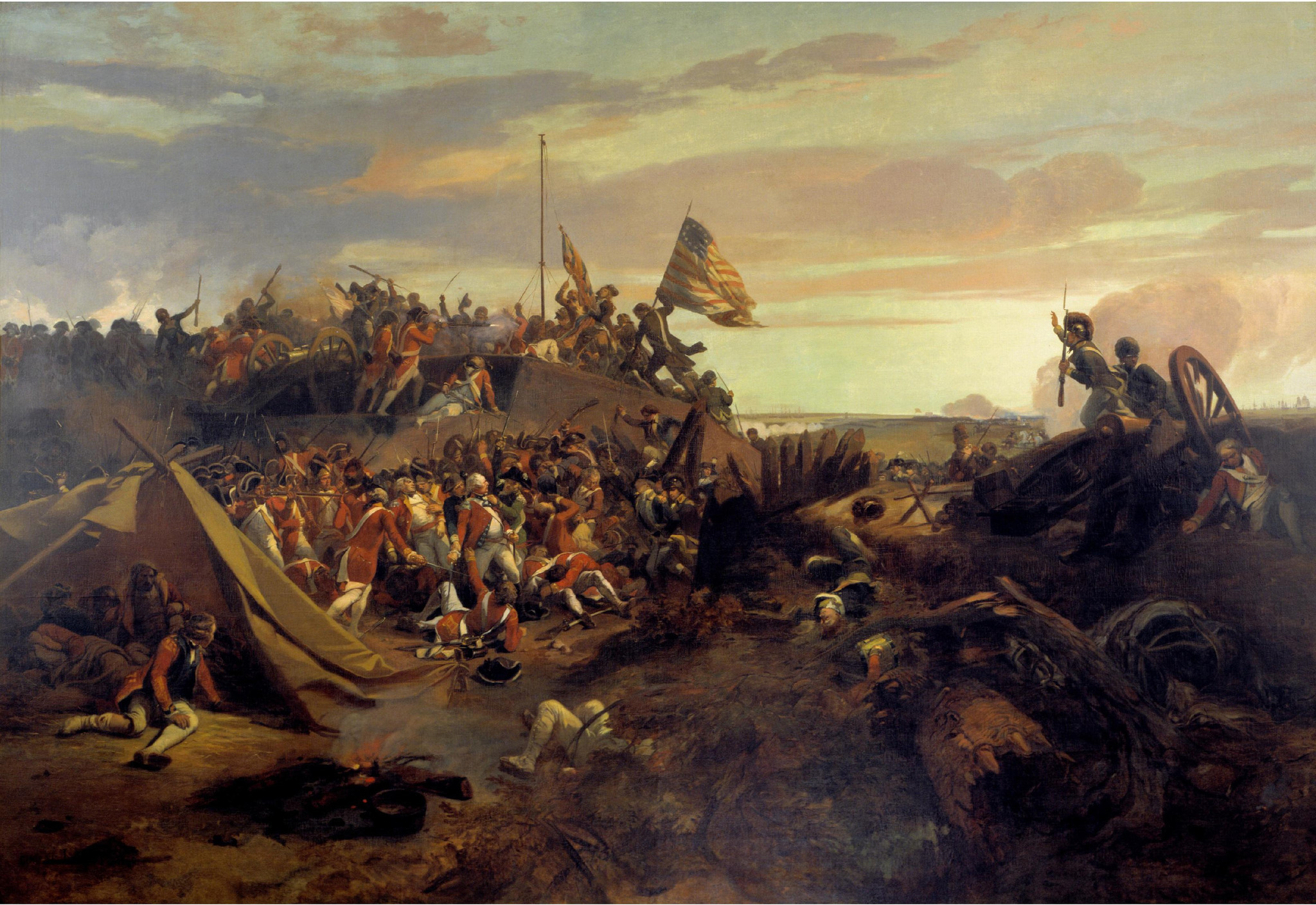
The storming of Redoubt No. 10 by Eugène Lami

By October 14, the trenches were within 150 yd (140 m) of Redoubt Nos. 9 and 10. Washington ordered that all guns within range begin blasting the redoubts to weaken them for an assault that evening. Washington planned to use the cover of a moonless night to gain the element of surprise. (Note: The pitch dark of a new moon occurred October 17.) To reinforce the darkness, he added silence, ordering that no soldier should load his musket until reaching the fortifications; the advance would be made with only "cold steel." Redoubt No. 10 was near the river and held by only 70 men, while redoubt 9 was a quarter-mile inland, and was held by 120 British and Germans. Both redoubts were heavily fortified with rows of abatis surrounding them, along with muddy ditches that surrounded the redoubts at about 25 yd (23 m). Washington’s officers devised a plan in which the French would launch a diversionary attack on the Fusiliers redoubt, and then a half an hour later, the French would assault Redoubt No. 9 and the Americans Redoubt No. 10. Redoubt No. 9 would be assaulted by 400 French regular soldiers of the Royal Deux-Ponts Regiment under the command of the Count of Deux-Ponts and redoubt 10 would be assaulted by 400 light infantry troops under the command of Alexander Hamilton. There was a brief dispute as to who should lead the attack on Redoubt No. 10. Lafayette named his aide, Jean-Joseph Sourbader de Gimat, who commanded a battalion of Continental light infantry. However, Hamilton protested, saying that he was the senior officer. Washington concurred with Hamilton and gave him command of the attack. (Note: Hamilton (through his subordinate, Major Nicholas Fish), Gimat, and Colonel Laurens commanded the three (of six) battalions of light infantry in Lafayette's Light Division that participated in the assault on redoubt 10.)

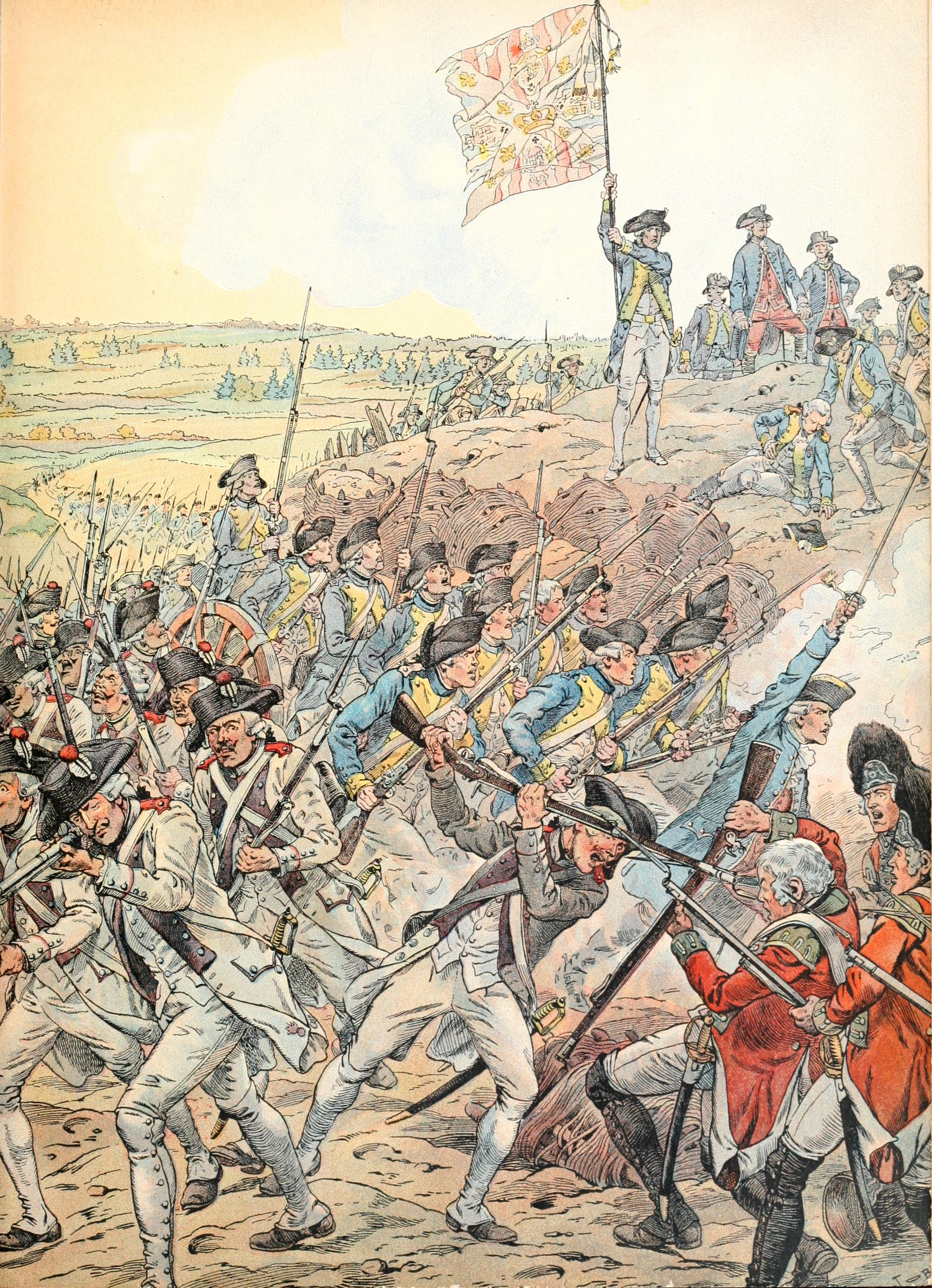
Storming of Redoubt No. 9

At 6:30 pm, gunfire announced the diversionary attack on the Fusiliers redoubt. At other places in the line, movements were made as if preparing for an assault on Yorktown itself, which caused the British to panic. With bayonets fixed, the Americans marched towards Redoubt No. 10. Hamilton sent Lieutenant Colonel John Laurens around to the rear of the redoubt to prevent the British from escaping. The Americans reached the redoubt and began chopping through the British wooden defenses with their axes. A British sentry called a challenge, and then fired at the Americans. The Americans responded by charging with their bayonets towards the redoubt. They hacked through the abatis, crossed a ditch and climbed the parapet into the redoubt. The Americans forced their way into the redoubt, falling into giant shell holes created by the preparatory bombardment. The British fire was heavy, but the Americans overwhelmed them. Someone in the front shouted, "Rush on boys! The fort's ours!" The British threw hand grenades at the Americans with little effect. Men in the trench stood on the shoulders of their comrades to climb into the redoubt. The bayonet fight cleared the British from the redoubt and almost the entire garrison was captured, including the commander of the redoubt, Major Campbell. In the assault, the Americans lost 9 dead and 25 wounded.

The French assault began at the same time, but they were halted by the abatis, which was undamaged by the artillery fire. The French began to hack at the abatis and a Hessian sentry came out and asked who was there. When there was no response, the sentry opened fire as did other Hessians on the parapet. The French soldiers fired back, and then charged the redoubt. The Germans charged the Frenchmen climbing over the walls, but the French fired a volley, driving them back. The Hessians then took a defensive position behind some barrels, but threw down their arms and surrendered when the French prepared a bayonet charge.

With the capture of Redoubts Nos. 9 and 10, Washington was able to have his artillery shell the town from three directions and the allies moved some of their artillery into the redoubts. On October 15, Cornwallis turned all of his guns onto the nearest allied position. He then ordered a storming party of 350 British troops under the command of Colonel Robert Abercromby to attack the allied lines and spike the American and French cannon (i.e., plug the touch hole with an iron spike). The allies were sleeping and unprepared. As the British charged, Abercromby shouted "Push on my brave boys, and skin the bastards!" The British party spiked several cannons in the parallel and then spiked the guns on an unfinished redoubt. A French party came and drove them out of the allied lines and back to Yorktown. The British had been able to spike six guns, but by the morning they were all repaired. The bombardment resumed with the American and French troops engaged in competition to see who could do the most damage to the enemy defenses.

On the morning of October 16, more allied guns were in line and the fire intensified. In desperation, Cornwallis attempted to evacuate his troops across the York River to Gloucester Point. At Gloucester Point, the troops might be able to break through the allied lines and escape into Virginia and then march to New York. One wave of boats made it across, but a squall hit when they returned to take more soldiers, making the evacuation impossible.

=== British surrender ===
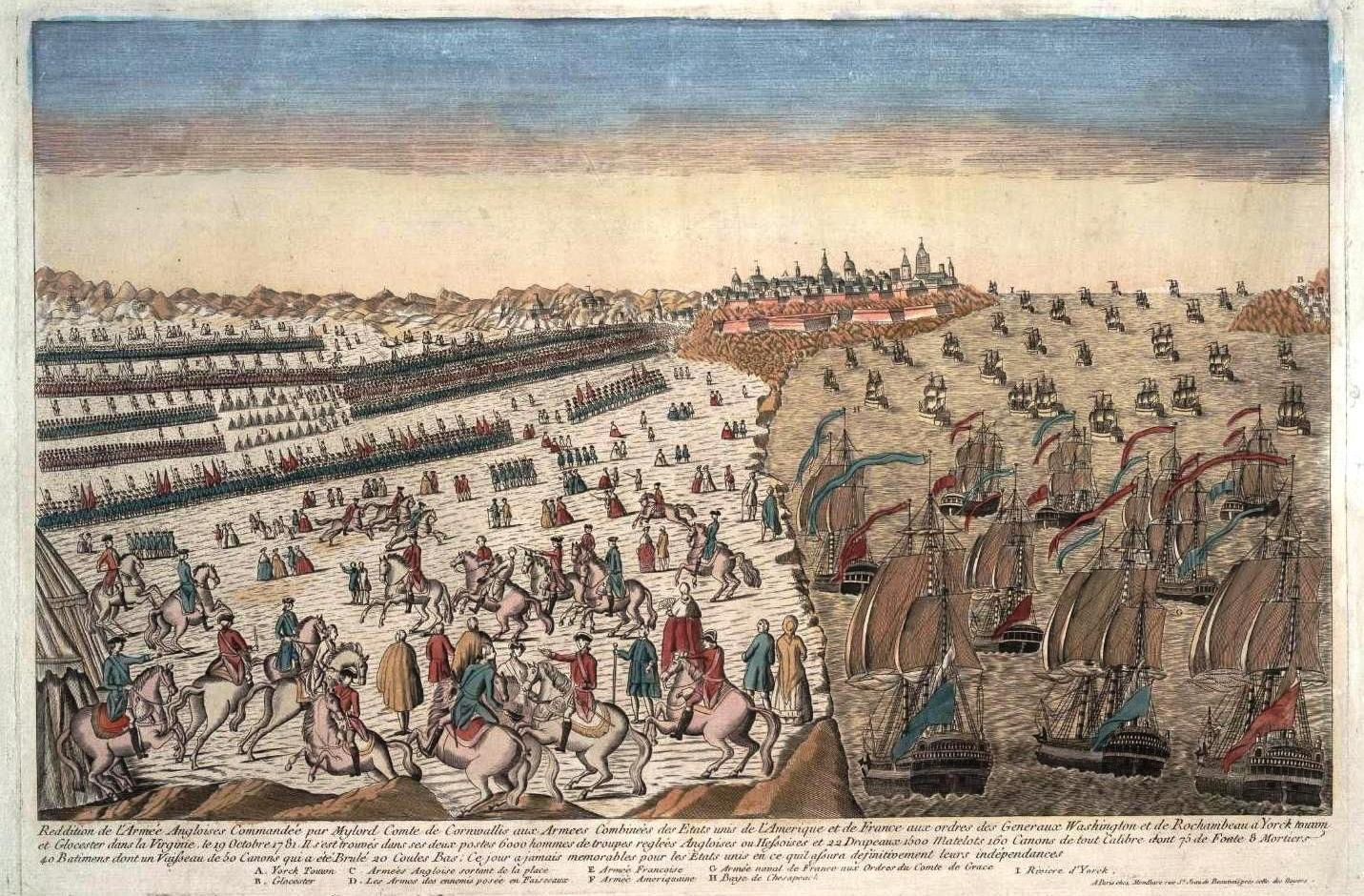
Overview of the capitulation of the British army at Yorktown, including Yorktown's blockade by a French squadron

The fire on Yorktown from the allies was heavier than ever as new artillery pieces joined the line. Cornwallis talked with his officers that day and they agreed that their situation was hopeless.

On the morning of October 17, a drummer appeared, followed by an officer waving a white handkerchief. The bombardment ceased, and the officer was blindfolded and led behind the French and American lines. Negotiations began at the Moore House on October 18 between Lieutenant Colonel Thomas Dundas and Major Alexander Ross (who represented the British) and Lieutenant Colonel Laurens (who represented the Americans) and Marquis de Noailles (who represented the French). To make sure that nothing fell apart between the French and Americans at the last minute, Washington ordered that the French be given an equal share in every step of the surrender process.

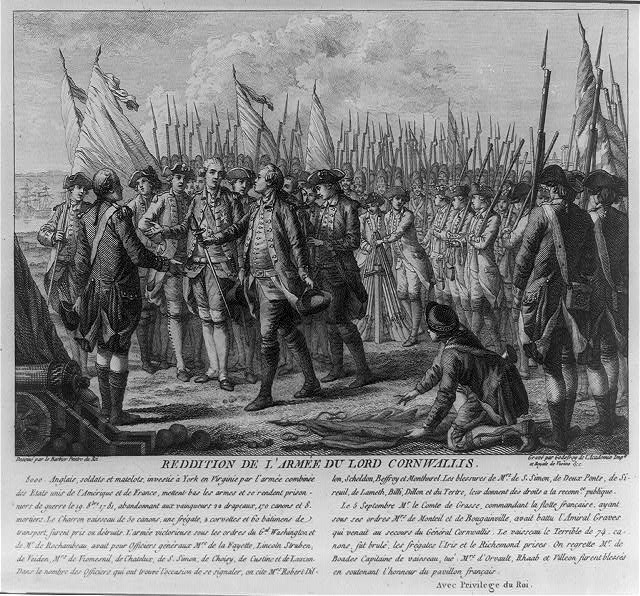
The surrender of Lord Cornwallis, October 19, 1781, at Yorktown

At 2:00 pm on October 19, the allied army entered the British positions, with the French on the left and the Americans on the right. The British had asked for the traditional honors of war, which would allow the army to march out with flags flying, bayonets fixed, and the band playing an American or French tune as a tribute to the victors. However, Washington firmly refused to grant the British the honors that they had denied the defeated American army the year before at the siege of Charleston. Consequently, the British and Hessian troops marched with flags furled and muskets shouldered, while the band was forced to play "a British or German march." (Note: Article 3 states that: "the garrison of York will march out to a place to be appointed in front of the posts, at two o'clock precisely, with shouldered arms, colors cased, and drums beating a British or German march. They are then to ground their arms, and return to their encampments, where they will remain until they are dispatched to the places of their destination.") American history books recount the legend that the British band played "The World Turn'd Upside Down", but the story may be apocryphal.

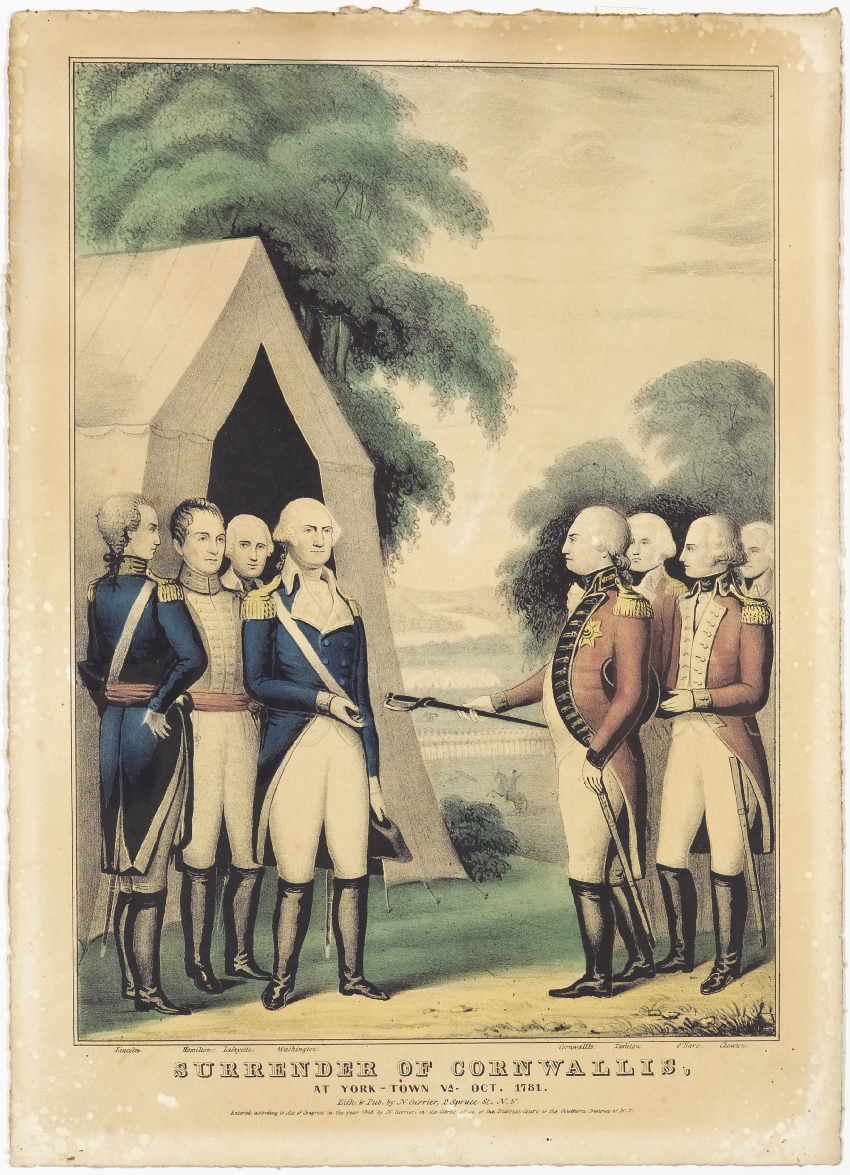
Surrender of Cornwallis. At Yorktown, VA, Oct. 1781, a painting by Nathaniel Currier, now housed at the D'Amour Museum of Fine Arts

Cornwallis refused to attend the surrender ceremony, claiming that he had an illness. Instead, Brigadier General Charles O'Hara led the British army onto the field. O'Hara first attempted to surrender to Rochambeau, who shook his head and pointed to Washington. O'Hara then offered his sword to Washington, who also refused and motioned to Major General Benjamin Lincoln, his second-in-command. The surrender finally took place when Lincoln accepted the sword of Cornwallis's deputy.

The British soldiers marched out and laid down their arms in between the French and American armies, while many civilians watched. At this time, the troops on the other side of the river in Gloucester also surrendered. The British soldiers had been issued new uniforms hours before the surrender and until prevented by General O'Hara some threw down their muskets with the apparent intention of smashing them. Others wept or appeared to be drunk. In all, 8,000 soldiers, 214 artillery pieces, thousands of muskets, 24 transport ships, wagons, and horses were captured.

=== Effect of disease ===
Malaria was endemic in the marshlands of eastern Virginia during the time, and Cornwallis's army suffered greatly from the disease; he estimated during the surrender that half of his army was unable to fight as a result. The Continental Army enjoyed an advantage, in that most of their members had grown up with malaria, and hence had acquired resistance to the disease. As malaria has a month-long incubation period, most of the French soldiers had not begun to exhibit symptoms before the surrender.

=== Articles of capitulation ===
The articles of capitulation, outlining the terms and conditions of surrender for officers, soldiers, military supplies, and personal property, were signed on October 19, 1781. Signatories included Washington, Rochambeau, the Comte de Barras (on behalf of the French Navy), Cornwallis, and Captain Thomas Symonds (the senior Royal Navy officer present). Washington declined to approve Article Ten of the fourteen articles in the draft sent to him for approval by the negotiators for both sides, as further noted with the summary of the article below. Conditions, methods of compliance or reservations were put on five other articles. Under the articles Cornwallis's men were declared prisoners of war and promised good treatment in American camps, and officers were permitted to return home after taking their parole. Washington refused to allow the British soldiers to be paroled and returned to England. Washington also required the "same honors will be granted to the Surrendering Army as were granted to the Garrison of Charleston." British general Clinton refused to give the garrison of Charleston the privilege of surrendering under the "customary honors of war." These including flags flying and drums beating and playing a "tune of the conqueror" as if to demonstrate those surrendering were equal in bravery. Instead of a tune of the conqueror, Washington required the British to beat a British or German march and to ground their arms at a place to be specified.

Article I provided for the surrender of the British land forces to the Americans and of the British naval forces and other mariners to the French as prisoners of war.

Article II required the delivery of British artillery, arms, accoutrements, military chests and public stores to heads of American departments appointed to receive them.

Article III provided that the two redoubts on the left flank of York were to be delivered, one to a detachment of American infantry, the other to a detachment of French grenadiers. The procedure of the surrender was specified. The British were required to ground their weapons and return to encampments until they could be marched off.

Article IV allowed British officers to retain their side-arms. Both officers and soldiers were allowed to keep their private property of every kind. No part of their baggage or papers were to be subject to search or inspection. The baggage and papers of officers and soldiers taken during the siege also were to preserved for them. This article was conditioned on any property obviously belonging to the inhabitants of the States that was in the possession of the garrison be subject to being reclaimed.

Under Article V, the British soldiers who were taken prisoner were to be kept in Virginia, Maryland, or Pennsylvania, and as much by regiments as possible, and supplied with the same rations of provisions as are allowed to soldiers in the service of America. A field-officer from each nation, British, Anspach, and Hessian, and other officers on parole, in the proportion of one to fifty men were to be allowed to reside near their respective regiments, to visit them frequently, and to be witnesses to their treatment. The officers would be allowed to receive and deliver clothing and other necessities for the prisoners. Passports were to be granted when the officers applied for them to make these deliveries. Washington rejected the provision that British or German soldiers could be returned to their native countries.

Under Article VI, the general, staff, and other officers not employed as mentioned in Article V, and who choose to do so, were to be permitted to go on parole to Europe, to New York, or to any other American maritime posts at present in the possession of the British forces, at their own option. Proper vessels were to be granted by the Count de Grasse to carry them under flags of truce to New York within ten days, if possible. They were required to reside in a district to be agreed upon later, until they embark. The officers of the civil department of the army and navy were included in this article. Passports to go by land to New York were to be granted to those to whom vessels for the trip could not be furnished.

Under Article VII, officers were to be allowed to keep soldiers as servants, according to the common practice of the service. Servants who were not soldiers were not to be considered as prisoners, and were allowed to attend their masters.

Under Article VIII, the sloop-of-war HMS Bonetta was to be equipped, and navigated by its present captain and crew, and left entirely at the disposal of Lord Cornwallis from the hour that the capitulation is signed, for an aid-de-camp to carry dispatches to Sir Henry Clinton. Cornwallis would be permitted to send such soldiers as he may think proper to send to New York, would be permitted to sail on the ship without examination. When his dispatches were ready, Cornwallis would deliver the ship to the Count de Grasse, if the ship escapes the dangers of the sea. The ship was not permitted to carry off any public stores. Any part of the crew that may be deficient on her return, and the soldiers passengers, were to be accounted for on her delivery. This loosely written article containing the words "without examination" allowed Cornwallis to include Tories and American deserters, "which Washington probably realized."

Under Article IX, the original terms were that traders were to preserve their property, and to be allowed three months to dispose of or remove them; and those traders were not to be considered as prisoners of war. This was modified so that the traders would be allowed to dispose of their effects, but the allied army having the right of preemption. The traders were to be considered as prisoners of war upon parole.

Under Article X, as written by the negotiators, natives or inhabitants of different parts of “this country”, at present in York or Gloucester, were not to be punished on account of having joined the British army. Washington refused to agree to this. The response was “This article cannot be assented to, being altogether of civil resort.” The outcry against the Tenth Article was vociferous and immediate, as Americans on both sides of the Atlantic proclaimed their sense of betrayal." On the other hand, Washington had allowed at least a partial loophole in Article VIII by allowing the Bonetta to sail without examination.

Under Article XI, proper hospitals were to be furnished for the sick and wounded British and allied soldiers. They were to be attended by their own surgeons on parole; and they were to be furnished with medicines and stores from the American hospitals. The following modifications were required. The hospital stores now at York and Gloucester were to be delivered for the use of the British sick and wounded. Passports were to be granted for procuring further supplies from New York, as occasion may require. Proper hospitals would be furnished for the reception of the sick and wounded of the two garrisons.

Under Article XII, wagons were to be furnished to carry the baggage of the officers attending the soldiers, and to surgeons when travelling on account of the sick, attending the hospitals at public expense. This was modified by the addition: “They are to be furnished if possible.”

Under Article XIII, the shipping and boats in the two harbors (Yorktown and Gloucester), with all their stores, guns, tackling, and apparel, were to be delivered in their present state to an officer of the French navy appointed to take possession of them. The article gave permission for the unloading of private property, part of which had been on board for security during the siege, before the ships were transferred.

Under Article XIV, no article of capitulation was to be infringed on pretense of reprisals. If there were any doubtful expressions in the articles, they were to be interpreted according to the common meaning and acceptance of the words.

== Aftermath ==
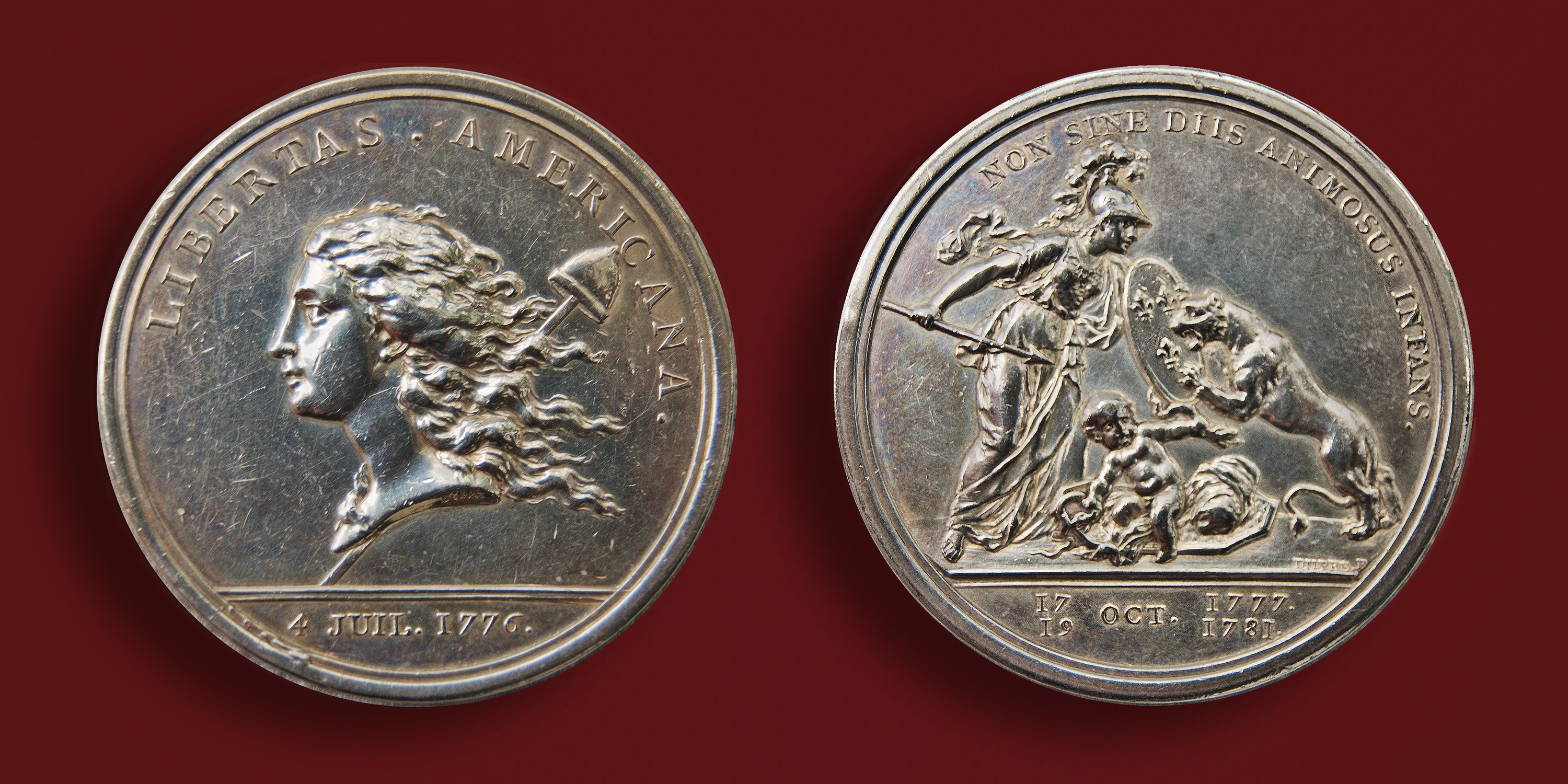
The victory at Yorktown and the American Revolution were honored in Libertas Americana, a 1783 medallion minted in Paris, designed there by US Ambassador Benjamin Franklin.

Following the British surrender, the American and French officers entertained the British officers to dinner. A common accounting regarding the dinner holds that the Americans refused to extend the invitation to Tarleton, due to the alleged atrocities committed by his troops in the Carolinas, however Anthony J. Scotti and Edwin Clein consider this to be apocryphal, due to a lack of mention in primary sources. Cornwallis did not attend the dinner, citing illness, and O'Hara was the head officer for the British. The Americans were amazed at O'Hara's composure but, unlike the French, they were not entertained by his air of self-satisfaction. The French were charmed by O'Hara and began to express sympathies for the British in their defeat and engaged the British officers in friendly conversation, even inviting them to private dinners. Rochambeau left the dinner given by Washington to visit and pay respects to Cornwallis. He even loaned Cornwallis 150,000 pounds in silver to refill his nearly empty military treasury. The mutual admiration of the French and British officers caused concern for the Americans about future relations with the French.

Five days after the battle ended, on October 24, 1781, the British fleet sent by Clinton to rescue the British army arrived. The fleet picked up several provincials who had escaped on October 18, and they informed Admiral Thomas Graves that they believed Cornwallis had surrendered. Graves picked up several more provincials along the coast, and they confirmed this fact. Graves sighted the French Fleet, but chose to leave because he was outnumbered by nine ships, and thus he sent the fleet back to New York.

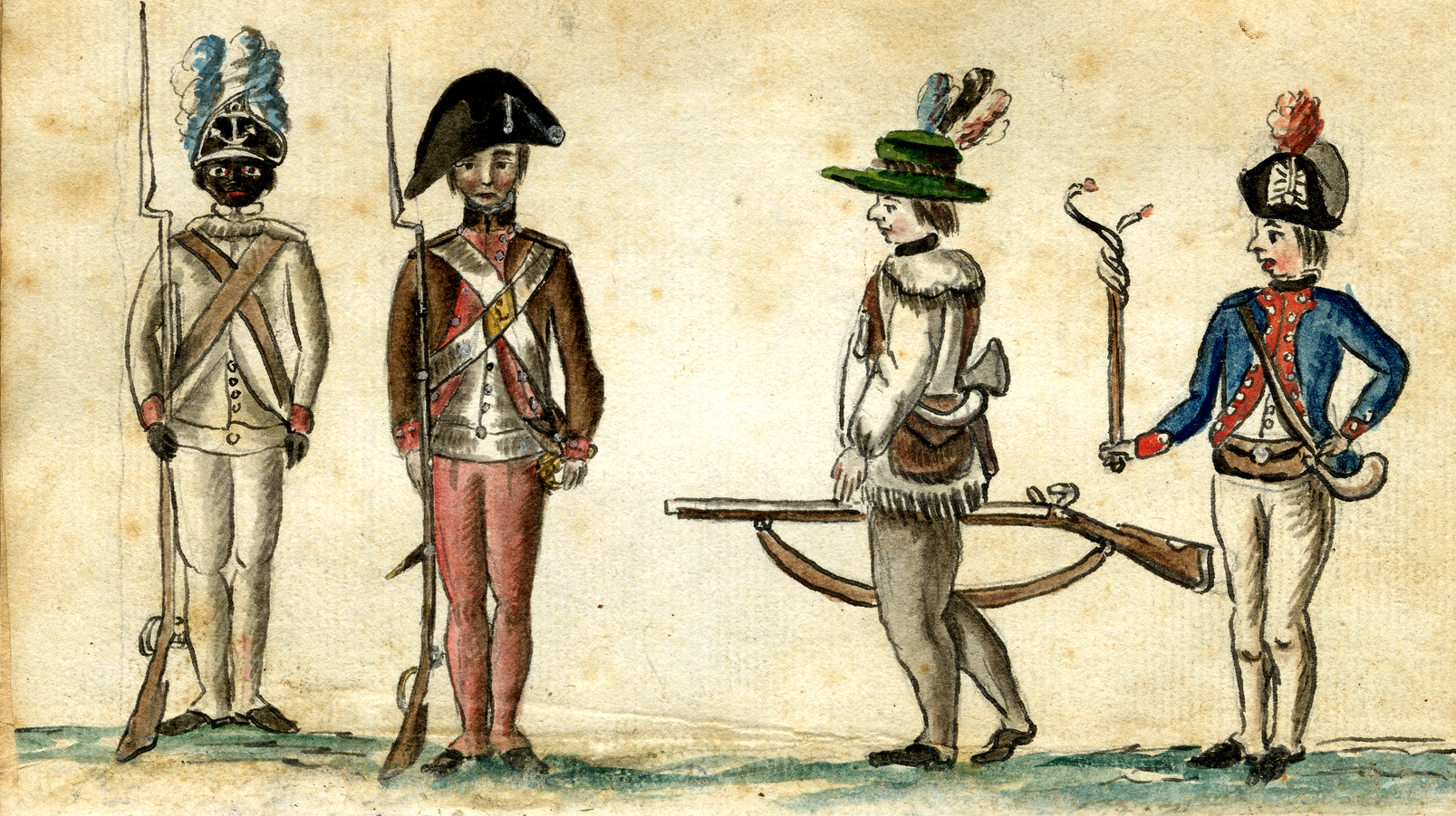
American and French soldiers at the siege of Yorktown. From left to right, a Black soldier from the First Rhode Island Regiment, a New England militiaman, a Western frontier rifleman, and a French officer

On October 25, Washington issued an order which stipulated that all fugitive slaves who had joined the British were to be rounded up by the Continental Army and placed under the supervision of armed guards in fortified positions on both sides of the York River until arrangements could be made to return them to their enslavers. The American historian Gregory J. W. Urwin describes Washington's action as "[converting] his faithful Continentals—the men credited with winning American independence—into an army of slave catchers."

After the British surrender, Washington sent Tench Tilghman to report the victory to Congress. After a difficult journey, he arrived in Philadelphia, which celebrated for several days. The British Prime Minister, Lord North, is reported to have exclaimed "Oh God, it's all over" when told of the defeat. On March 4, 1782, a motion to end "further prosecution of offensive warfare on the continent of North America"—effectively a no confidence motion—passed in the British House of Commons. Lord North and his government resigned on March 20.

Washington moved the Continental Army to New Windsor, New York, where they remained until the Treaty of Paris was signed on September 3, 1783, bringing the eight-year war to an end and establishing the independence of the colonies. Although the peace treaty did not happen for two years following the end of the battle, the Yorktown campaign proved to be decisive; there was no significant battle or campaign on the North American mainland after the Battle of Yorktown and in March 1782, "the British Parliament had agreed to cease hostilities."

== Legacy ==
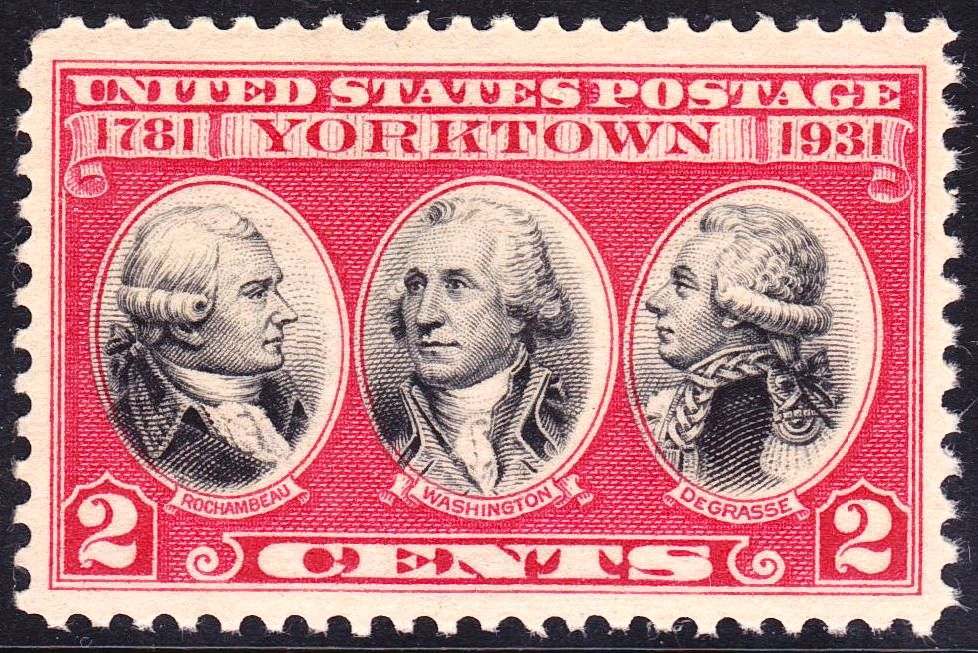
A 1931 US postage stamp depicting Rochambeau, Washington, and de Grasse, issued in commemoration of the 150th anniversary of the victory at Yorktown in 1781

Yorktown Day is held annually every October 19, featuring a patriotic parade down Yorktown's Main Street, wreath-laying ceremonies, and tactical demonstrations.

There is a belief that General Cornwallis's sword, surrendered by Charles O'Hara after the battle, is to this day on display at the White House. However, U.S. National Park Service historian Jerome Green, in his 2005 history of the siege, The Guns of Independence, concurs with the 1881 centennial account by Johnston, noting simply that when Brigadier General O'Hara presented the sword to Major General Lincoln, he held it for a moment and immediately returned it to O'Hara.

The American Battlefield Trust and its partners have preserved 49 battlefield acres outside of the national park as of mid-2023.

The siege of Yorktown is also known in some German historiographies as "die deutsche Schlacht" ("the German battle"), because Germans played significant roles in all three armies, accounting for roughly one third of all forces involved. According to one estimate more than 2,500 German soldiers served at Yorktown with each of the British and French armies, and more than 3,000 German Americans were in Washington's army.

Four Army National Guard units (113th Inf, 116th Inf, 175th Inf, and 198th Sig Bn) and one active Regular Army Field Artillery battalion (1–5th FA) are derived from American units that participated in the Battle of Yorktown.

== Yorktown Victory Monument ==
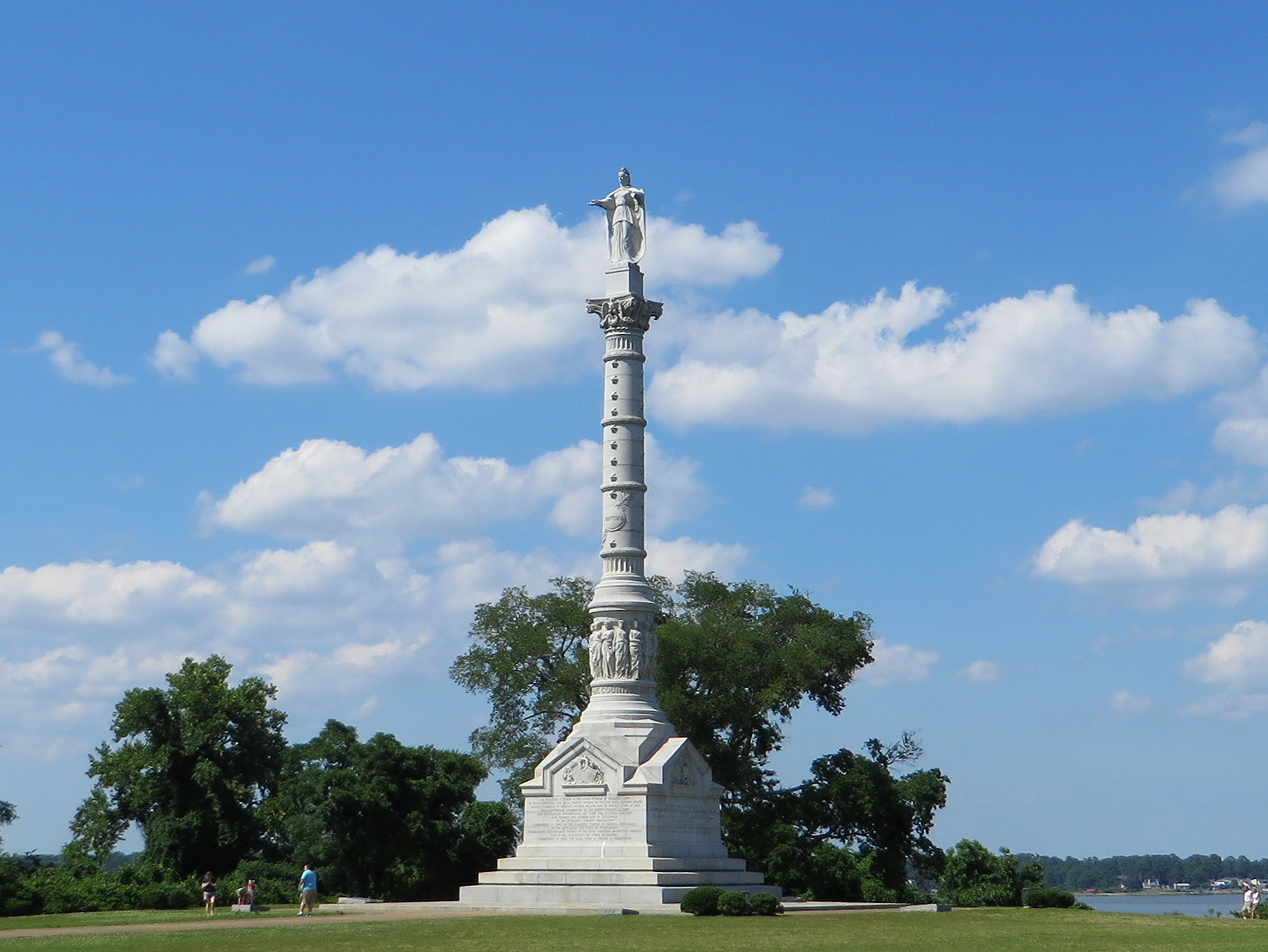
The Yorktown Victory Monument

Five days after the British surrendered, Congress passed a resolution agreeing to erect a structure dedicated to commemorating those who participated in the battle. Construction of the monument was delayed, however, as the Confederation government had several other financial obligations that were considered to be of a more urgent nature. In 1834, the citizens of Yorktown asked Congress for the monument to be constructed, and then followed up once again in 1836, but still no action was taken. The desirability of the project was recognized in 1876 "when a memorial from the Common Council of Fredericksburg, Virginia was before Congress."

The project was postponed once again until the battle's centennial sparked renewed enthusiasm in the resolution and prompted the government to begin building the monument in 1881 amid national support. The crowning figure was set on August 12, 1884; the structure was officially reported in a communication as complete on January 5, 1885, and currently resides within Colonial National Historical Park. The artists commissioned by the Secretary of War for the monument project included Mr. R. M. Hunt (Chairman) and Mr. J. Q. A. Ward (Architect) of New York and Mr. Henry Van Brunt (Sculptor) of Boston.

== Yorktown centennial, sesquicentennial, and bicentennial celebrations ==
On October 19, 1881, an elaborate ceremony was held to commemorate the battle's centennial. U.S. naval vessels floated on Chesapeake Bay, and special markers highlighted where Washington and Lafayette's siege guns were placed. President Chester Arthur, sworn in only thirty days before, following James Garfield's death, made his first public speech as president. Also present were descendants of Lafayette, Rochambeau, de Grasse, and Steuben. To close the ceremony, Arthur gave an order to salute the British flag.

A four-day celebration to commemorate the 150th anniversary of the siege took place in Yorktown on October 16–19, 1931. It was presided over by the Governor of Virginia, John Garland Pollard, and attended by then-President Herbert Hoover, along with representatives from France. The event included the official dedication of the Colonial National Historical Park, where the battlegrounds are preserved and interpreted.

The Yorktown Bicentennial was a major national celebration held on October 16–19, 1981, to commemorate the 200th anniversary of the British surrender. The four-day event, centered at the Yorktown Battlefield, was attended by an estimated 25,000 to 200,000 visitors. President Ronald Reagan and French President François Mitterrand were the primary headliners. Historical enthusiasts from over 20 states performed large-scale reenactments of the 1781 battle and the British surrender. The Yorktown Victory Center hosted the exhibition titled "The World Turned Upside Down," featuring rare artifacts on loan from the Palace of Versailles, including George Washington’s diary and the actual surrender table. The Daughters of the American Revolution (DAR) dedicated a bronze and granite commemorative plaque to honor the French fleet and refurnished the historic Moore House with colonial-era antiques for the event.

The U.S. Postal Service issued a pair of commemorative stamps honoring the 200th anniversary of the Battle of Yorktown and the Battle of the Virginia Capes.

== American Revolution Museum at Yorktown ==
The American Revolution Museum at Yorktown is a comprehensive historical complex that chronicles the nation's founding, from the beginnings of colonial unrest to the formation of the new United States. Administered by the Jamestown-Yorktown Foundation, the museum features indoor galleries with rare artifacts (including a July 1776 Boston broadside of the Declaration of Independence), immersive films, and outdoor living-history areas such as a Continental Army encampment and a re-created farm based on the real-life Edward Moss family. The site first opened on April 1, 1976, as the Yorktown Victory Center, serving as one of three Bicentennial centers in Virginia. The museum officially opened under its current name and structure on April 1, 2017.

== See also ==
- Yorktown (The World Turned Upside Down)
- List of American Revolutionary War battles
- List of George Washington articles
- USS Yorktown, for a list of U.S. Navy ships named after the battle
