= Libertas Americana =

Medal made to commemorate the American Revolution

- France (for the United States)
- Value: Non-circulating
- Diameter: 47-48 mm (1.85-1.89 in)
- Edge: Plain
- Composition: Gold, silver (.925 fine), copper/bronze
- Gold: 1.85 troy oz
- Silver: 1.47 troy oz
- Years of minting: 1783; 243 years ago (original) with modern strikes and reproductions
- Mintage: Limited

Obverse
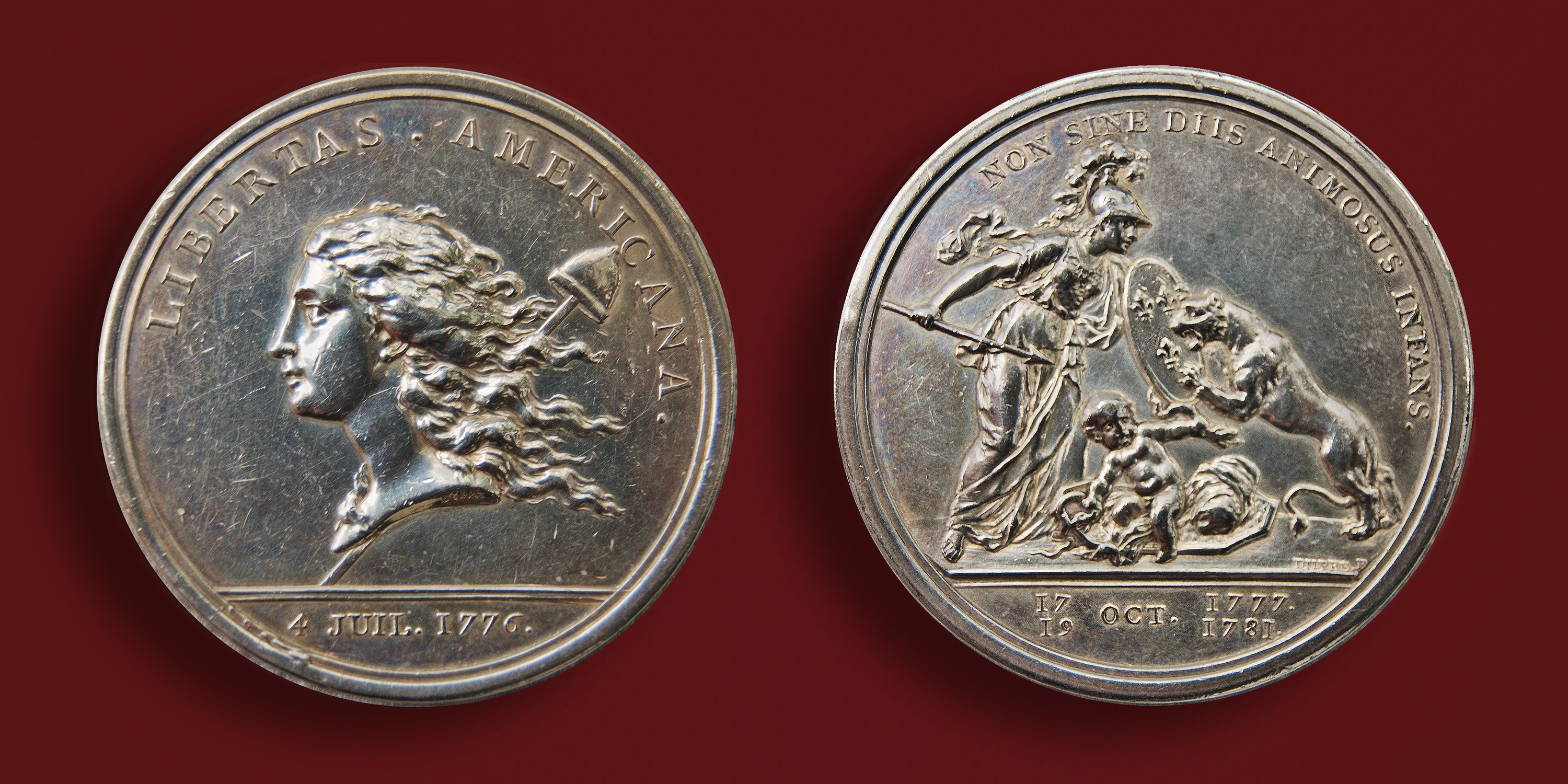
- Design: Draped bust of Liberty facing left with flowing hair
- Designer: Augustin Dupré, Benjamin Franklin

Reverse
- Design: Infant Hercules (young America) strangling two serpents (representing British Generals Burgoyne and Cornwallis); Minerva defends with shield of fleur-de-lis against a lioness (Britian)
- Designer: Esprit-Antoine Gibelin

The Libertas Americana was a medal struck to commemorate the American Revolution. It was conceived by Benjamin Franklin and designed by the French artist Esprit-Antonie Gibelin. The dies were engraved by Augustin Dupré.

== Inception ==
The medal was originally conceived by Benjamin Franklin to commemorate the victories at the Siege of Yorktown and the Battle of Saratoga. Franklin outlined the medal in a letter to Robert Livingston dated March 4, 1782; in the letter, Franklin compared the victories to an infant Hercules strangling two serpents.

== Design ==
The reverse design was further developed by Esprit-Antonie Gibelin and Augustin Dupré.

The obverse of the medal features the goddess Liberty with the motto LIBERTAS AMERICANA above. Beside her is a pole adorned with a Phrygian cap and the date 4 JUIL 1776 below.

The reverse features the infant Hercules representing the United States being attacked by a lion representing Great Britain. The infant, who is shown strangling two snakes, is being protected by Athena who represents France. The reverse includes the motto NON SINE DIIS ANIMOSUS INFANS, from Horace's ode "Descende coelo", which translates to "The infant is not bold without the aid of the gods." The dates for the Battle of Saratoga and Siege of Yorktown are below.

== Issue ==
The medal was minted in copper, silver, and gold. The only two gold medals were presented to Louis XVI and Marie Antoinette. It is presumed they were lost in the French Revolution and never found.

== Legacy ==
The depiction of Liberty on the medal influenced the design of early United States coinage.

A modern restrike of the medal from the Monnaie de Paris was used in the coin toss for Super Bowl LX.
