= Augustin Dupré =

French sculptor

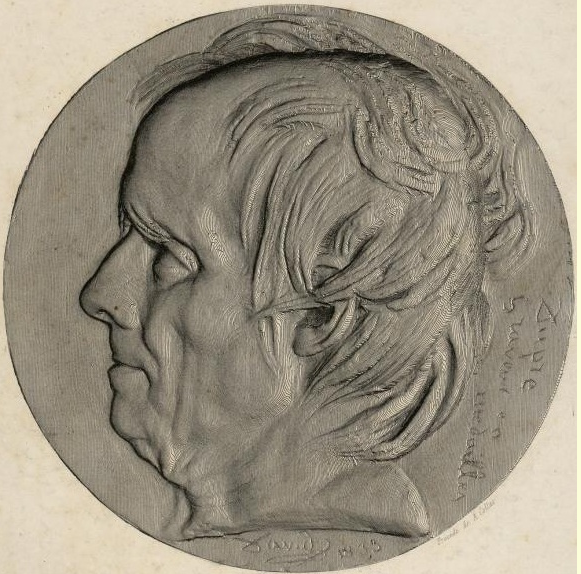
The picture of an original sculpture of Augustin Dupré, signed by David d'Angers.

Augustin Dupré (6 October 1748 – 30 January 1833) was a French engraver of currency and medals, the 14th Graveur général des monnaies (Engraver General of Currency).

== Biography ==
He began his career as an engraver at the royal factory for weapons. Towards 1770, he became established at Paris, became the student of the sculptor David, and engraved his first medals.

The French Revolution gave him the opportunity to develop his art. Because the change of regime and the monetary reform required a full change of monetary types, a competition, initiated by the painter Louis David, was opened in April 1791 by the Convention nationale. Dupré's design won and was adopted for the new currency, the "Louis conventionnel". Following this success, Dupré was named Graveur général des monnaies by decree of the Assemblée nationale on 11 July 1791. In France before the revolution there were 31 royal mints, but most of them were no more than sinecures. In 1789, there were no more than 17 mints, and Dupré wanted to have a great new mint in Paris to produce all French currency. However, the Assemblée nationale rejected his idea and retained 8 mints: Paris, Lyon, Bordeaux, Bayonne, Perpignan, Nantes, Lille, and Strasbourg. He occupied his official position until 1803, the year in which he was dismissed by a decree of the First Consul of 12 March 1803. He was replaced by Pierre-Joseph Tiolier.

== His monetary works ==
"Winged genius" by Dupré
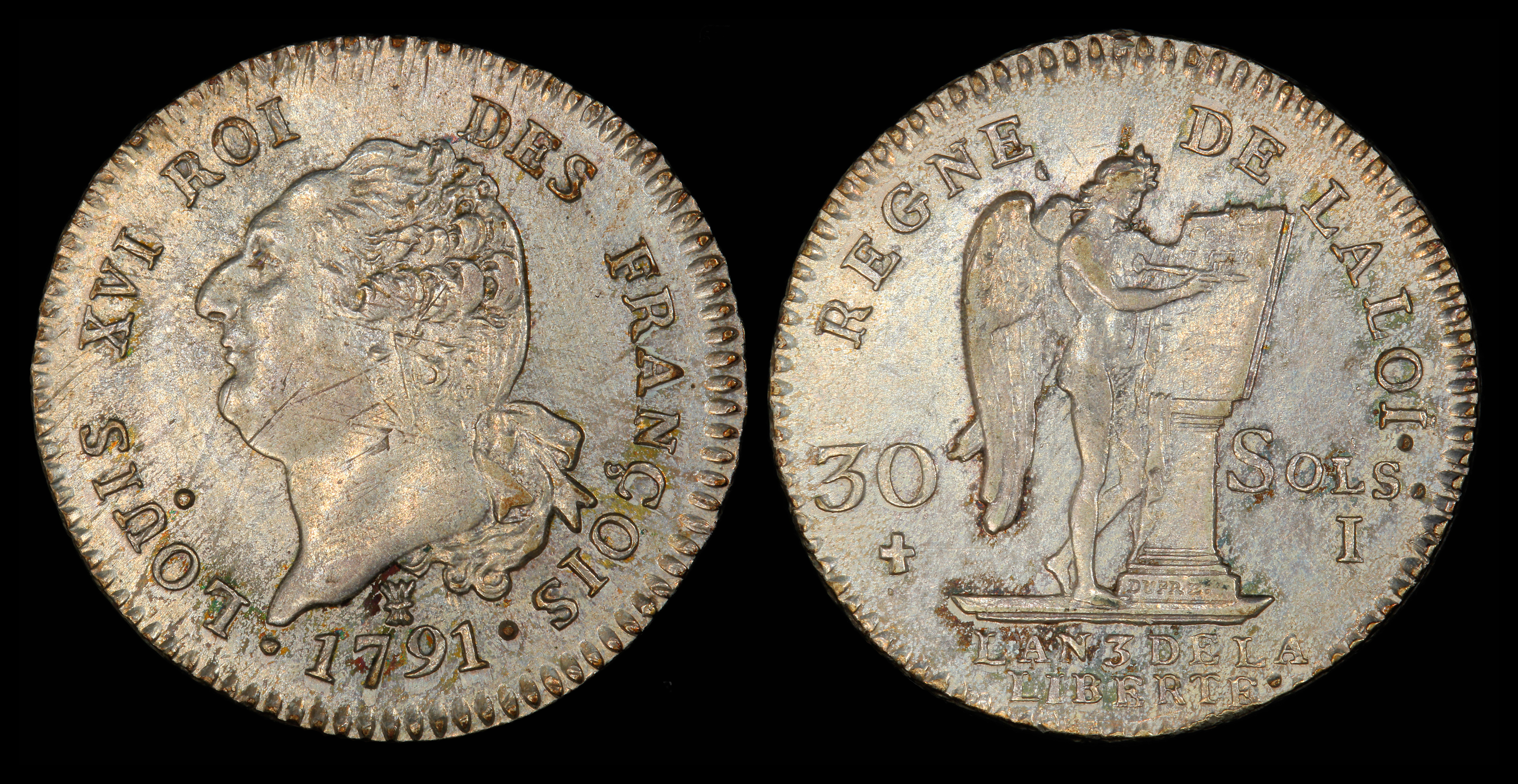
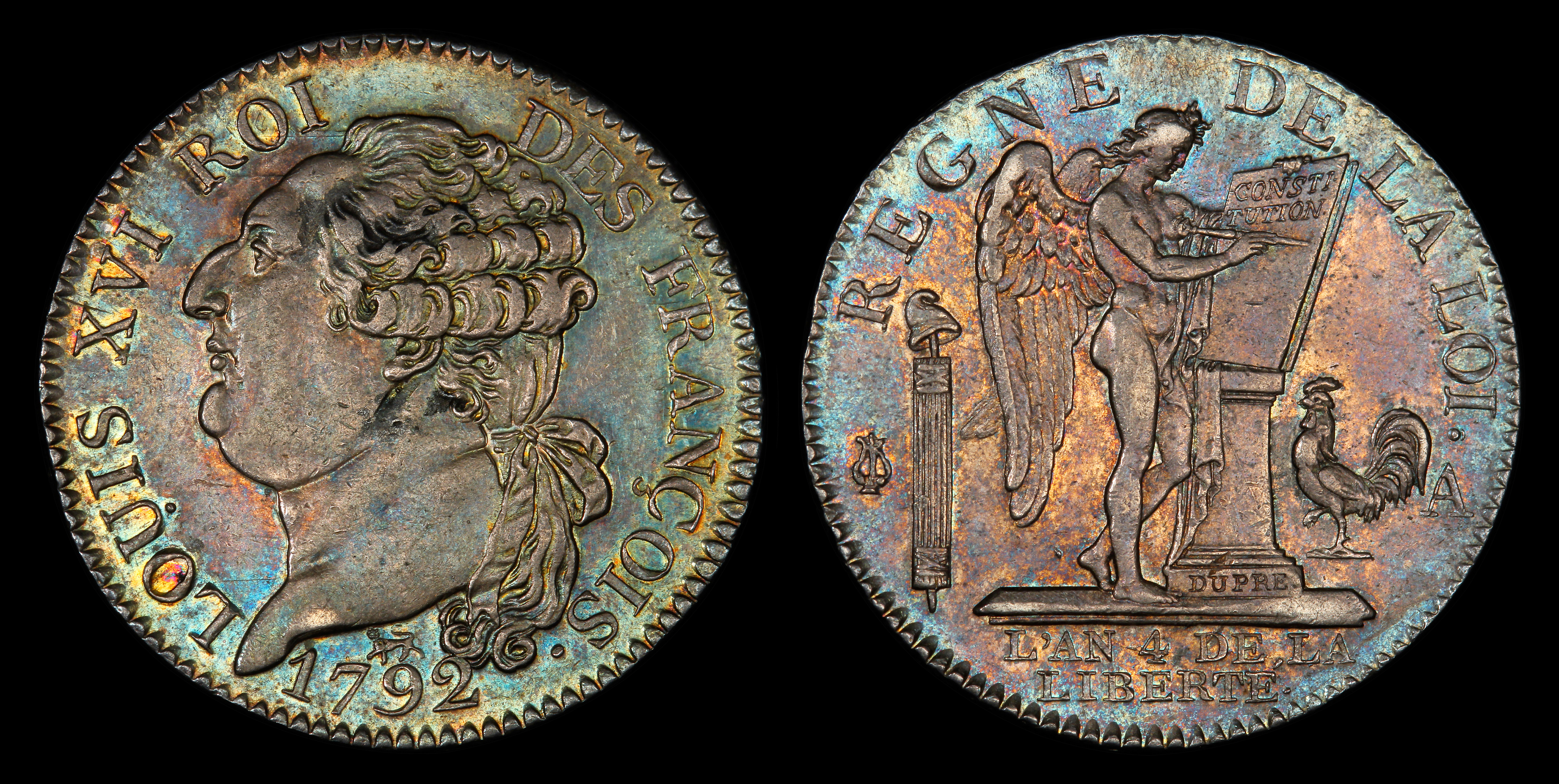
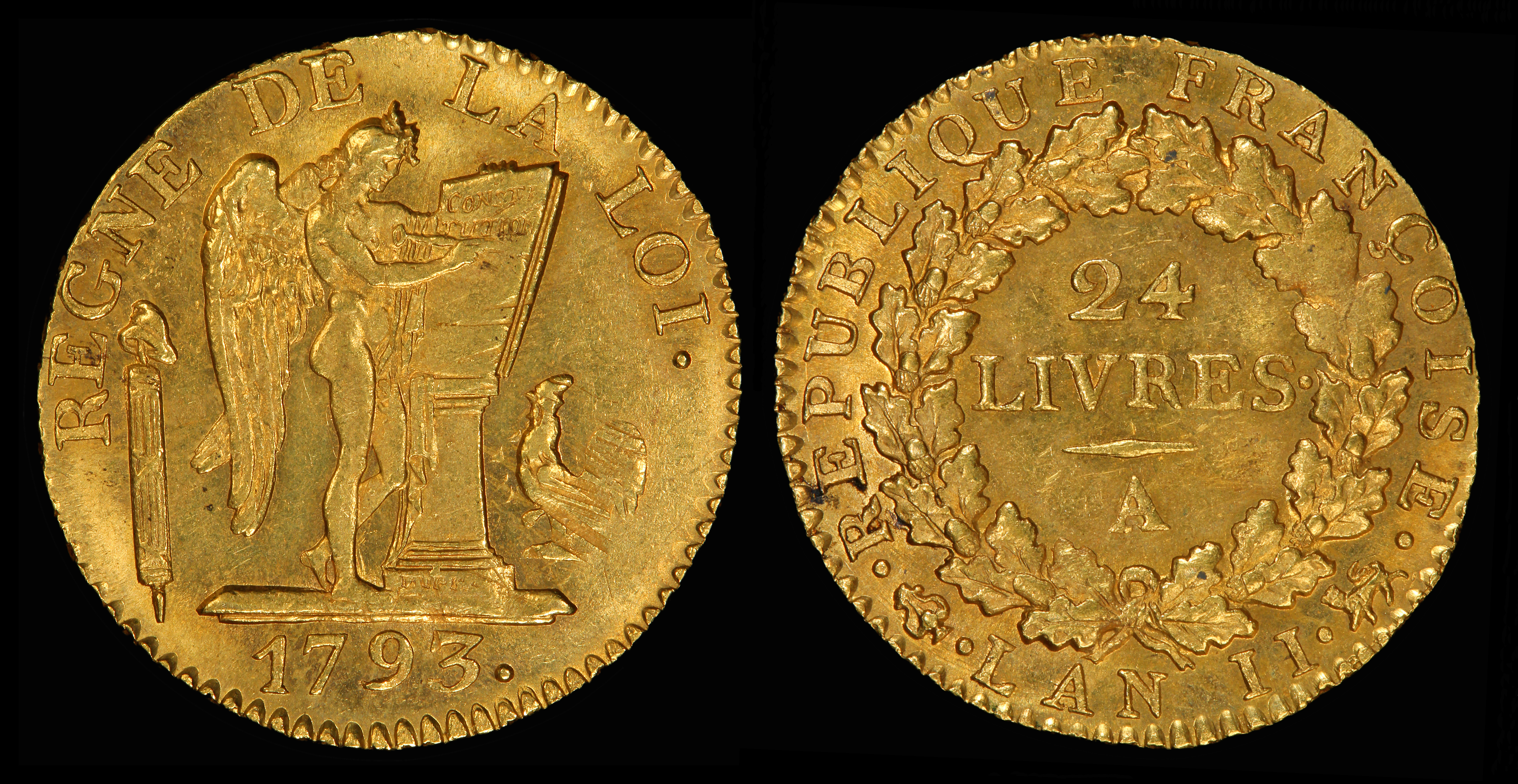
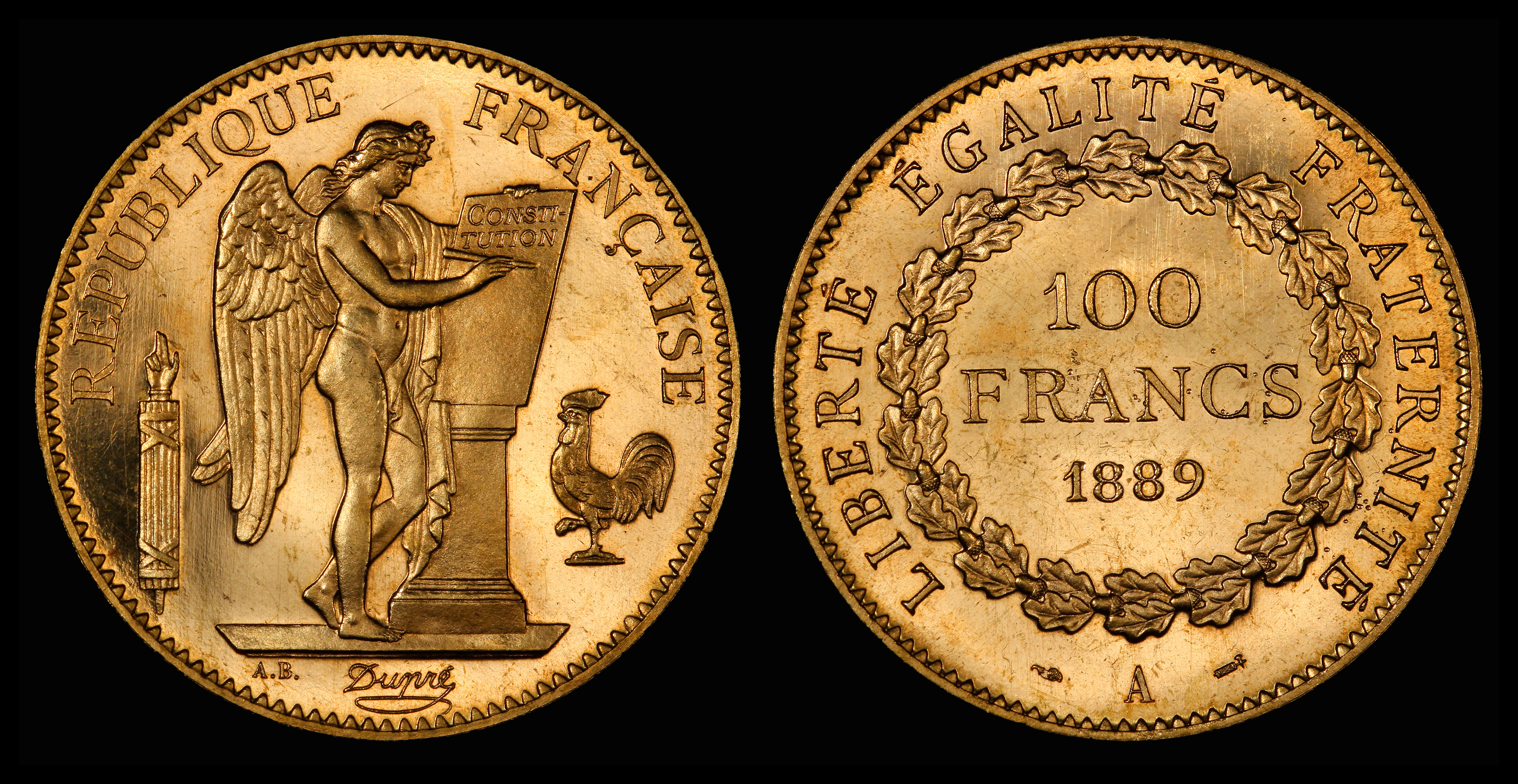
30 Sols (1791), Half Écu (1792)
24 Livres (1793), 100 Francs (1889)

The French Revolution encouraged the artists to celebrate the new order. Augustine Dupré derived the inspiration of his allegoric compositions from the symbolism of antiquity (tables of law, genius of freedom, Hercules, Phrygian cap, fasces of lictors, scales, etc.). It was the triumph of neoclassical style.

His first contribution was the Louis of gold, 24 livres, portraying Au génie, the obverse still carrying the portrait of Louis XVI, the motto Roi des Français (King of the French), and the date 1792. The reverse represents a Génie ailé (Winged genius) that writes the word Loi on a stèle, with the motto Le Règne de la Loi (The Reign of the Law) and the declaration An III de la liberté (Year three of the liberty). An écu of six livres and a half écu in silver again take up this design.

When the republic was proclaimed, Dupré engraved the bulk of the new revolutionary decimal currency. He introduced the five franc silver piece stamped with the image of Hercules, Union et Force which marked the renaissance of the franc, and the coins of 1 centime, 5 centimes, 1 décime and 2 décimes with the head of the republic wearing the Phrygian cap.

Dupré was a talented engraver and the composition which he created for the 5-franc represented the republic during almost 200 years. The écu à l'Hercule created in 1796, was again struck in 1848, then in 1870 and 1877. The new franc of 1960 renewed honor to Dupré by the striking of silver commemorative coins of 10 francs (1965–1973) and 50 francs (1974–1977).

In 1996 the Fifth Republic also honored him by issuing a 5 franc commemorative coin.

== Medals by Dupré ==
Before the French revolution, Dupré had a reputation as one of the leading French medallists, along with Bertrand Andrieu, Pierre Droz, Benjamin Duvivier, Nicolas-Marie Gautteaux, and François Tasselon. Two examples of Dupré's famous medals are in honor of Lavoisier and Admiral Suffren.

His medals related to the American republic include: the Libertas Americana, 1783; the Greene medal, 1787; the Morgan and Jones medals, 1789; the Diplomatic medal, 1792; and two medals of Franklin, 1784 and 1786. Thomas Jefferson ordered the Diplomatic medal in 1790. It is unknown who ordered the two medals of Franklin; it is certain that Franklin himself did not.

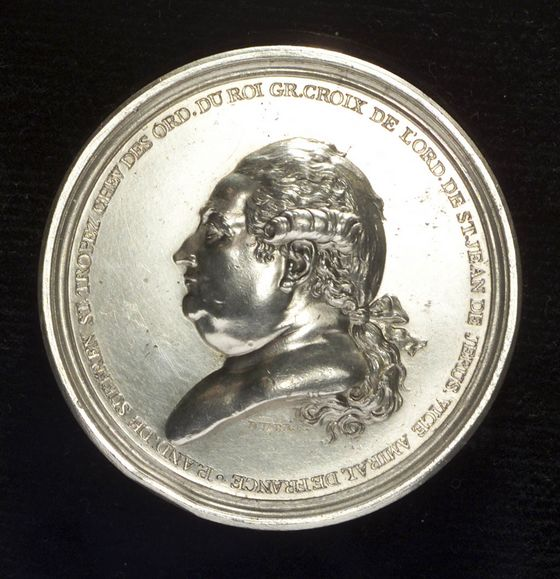
Medal in silver commissioned from Dupré and issued in 1784 by the American republic to honor Admiral Suffren

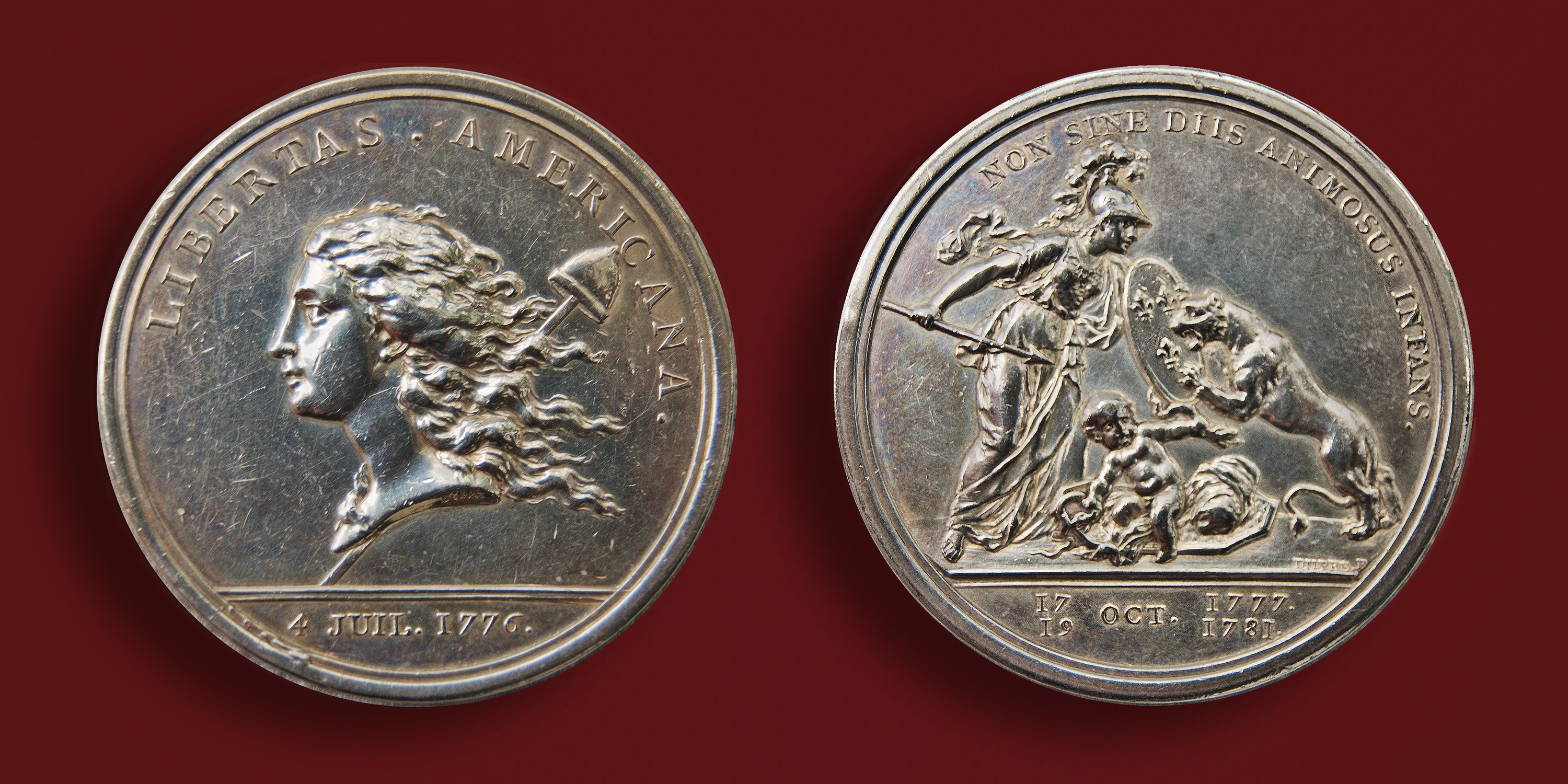
Libertas Americana (1783), Dupré engraved medallion which was designed and commissioned by Benjamin Franklin while serving as US Ambassador to France.
