= Friedrich August Valentin Voit von Salzburg =

Hessian military commander (1734–1798)

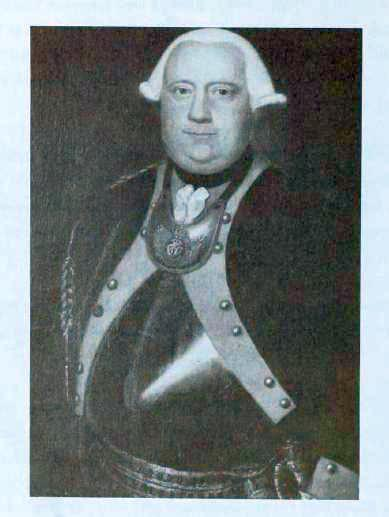
Friedrich August Valentin Voit of Salzburg, the Bavarian Army Museum in Ingolstadt

Friedrich August Valentin Voit von Salzburg (June 26, 1734 – May 14, 1798) was a commander of military units from Ansbach-Bayreuth. During the American Revolutionary War, Great Britain rented auxiliary troops from various German states. Voit commanded the First Regiment of the Ansbach Regiment led by Friedrich Ludwig Albrecht von Eyb, designated the Voit Regiment. In May 1778, Eyb left and Voit took charge of the regiment. Also, he was in command of all Ansbach troops in North America by the time the war had ended.
