= Moore House (Yorktown, Virginia) =

- U.S. National Historic Landmark
- U.S. Historic district – Contributing property
- Virginia Landmarks Register
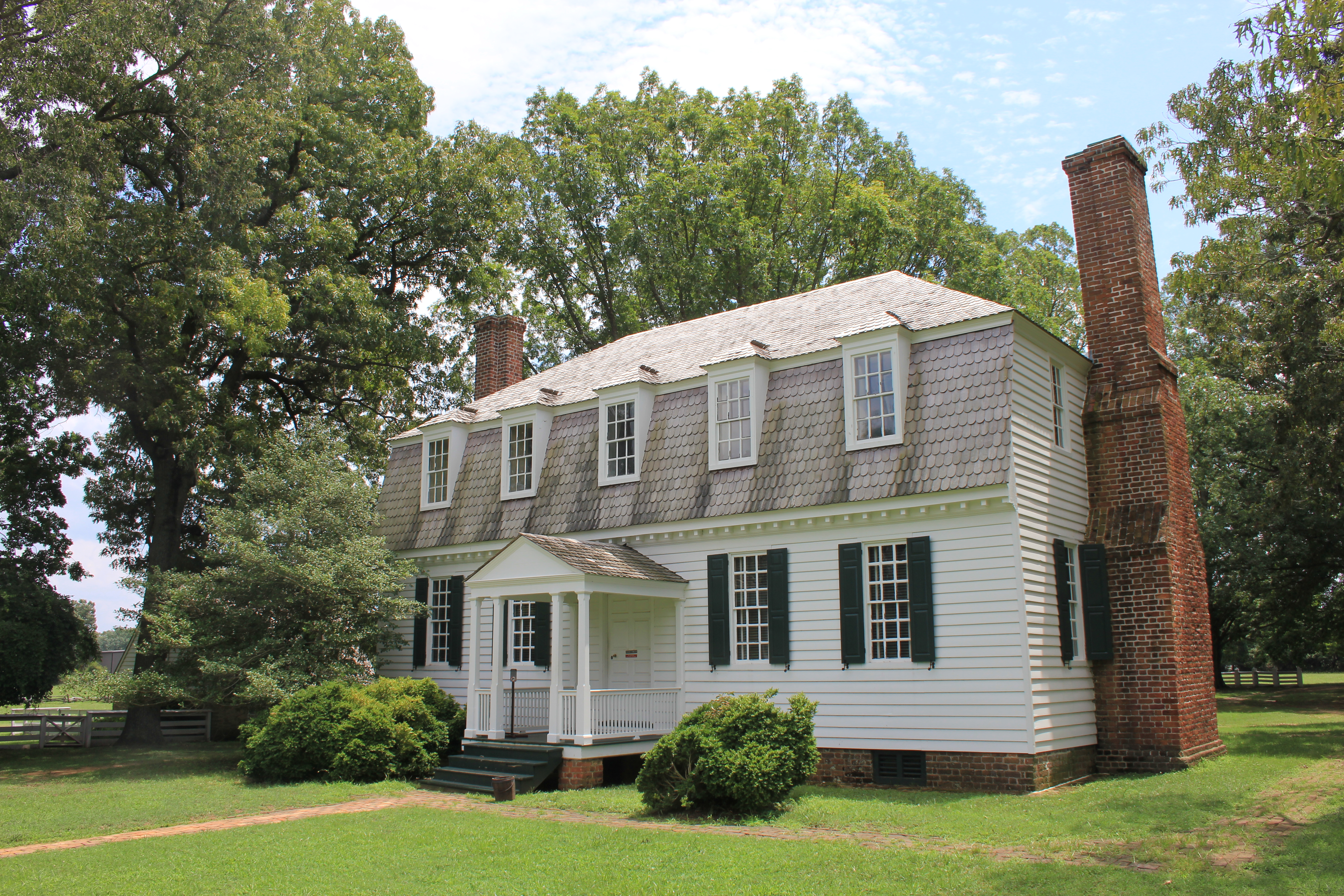

- Location within Virginia
- Nearest city: Yorktown, Virginia
- Coordinates: 37°13′18.34″N 076°29′09.27″W
- Built: ~1725
- Architectural style: Colonial
- Restored: 1931–1934
- VLR No.: 047-0002
- Designated VLR: See individual properties

The Moore House is a historic building located within Colonial National Historical Park, in York County, Virginia. During the American Revolutionary War, it was the site of negotiations for British General Charles Cornwallis's surrender at the Siege of Yorktown.

== History ==
The house was erected around 1725 on a 500-acre parcel of land called Temple Farm which also included a dam and grist mill.

The land was originally granted to the Crown Governor of Virginia, John Harvey in the 1630s and was known as the York Plantation at this time. Lawrence Smith II later built the Moore House on Temple Farm and the home stayed within the family until 1754 when his son, Robert, sold it to his brother-in-law Augustine Moore to avoid financial woes. Augustine and his family fled to Richmond to avoid the Siege of Yorktown.

=== Siege of Yorktown ===
General Cornwallis requested a cease fire on October 17, 1781, and selected the house as the site for surrender negotiations, likely due to its neutral and convenient location. Washington's and Cornwallis's representatives met at the house the following day, where they negotiated Articles of Capitulation. A rough draft was delivered to Washington's headquarters that night, where he made minor changes. The revised articles were agreed to and signed on October 19.

=== Later history ===
The House passed to Hugh Nelson in 1797 following the deaths of Augustine and his wife. It had several owners over the years and was significantly damaged during the 1862 Siege of Yorktown. Later the house's wood was pilfered by soldiers for fire fuel. The house was not repaired until the advent of the Battle of Yorktown Centennial Celebration in 1881. The National Park Service restored the house between 1931 and 1934 using historic photos. It was dedicated on 18–19 October 1934. The restoration work was the first of its kind undertaken by the National Park Service.
