= Friedrich Ludwig Albrecht von Eyb =

Friederich Ludwig Albrecht von Eyb was a military commander of Ansbach-Bayreuth. In 1776, when the American Revolutionary War broke out, the Kingdom of Great Britain appealed to various German princes for troops in return for payment. Von Eyb commanded the Bayreuth regiment from 1776 to May 1778, when he returned to Uffenheim.
