= Proposed flags of U.S. states =

This is a list of U.S. state flags that have been submitted to state legislatures or have received media coverage.

== State flags ==
Listed alphabetically with their respective date of proposal:

=== Alaska ===
(1927)

(1927)

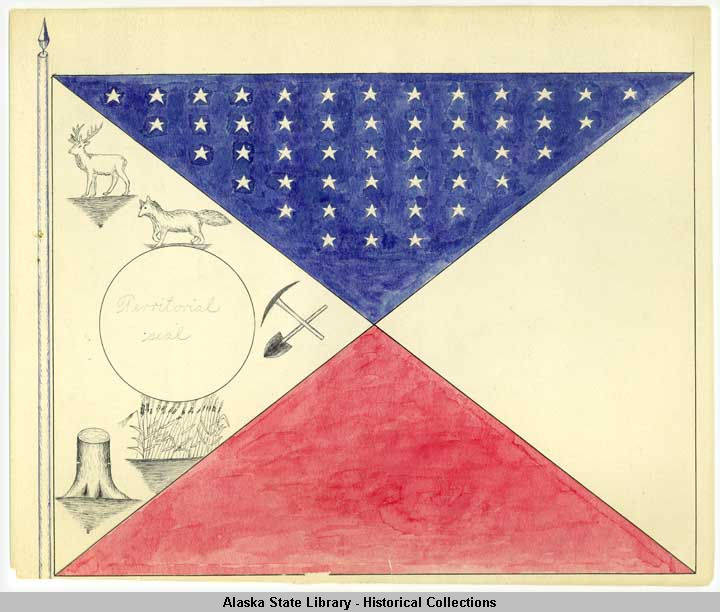
(1927)

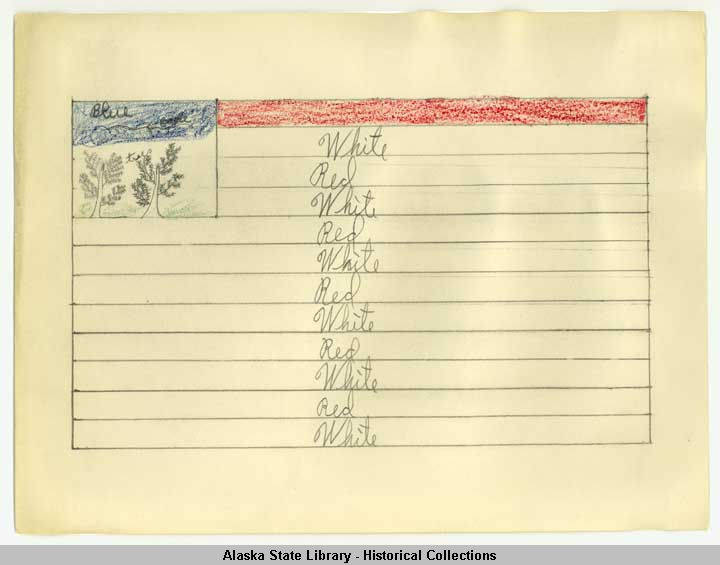
(1927)

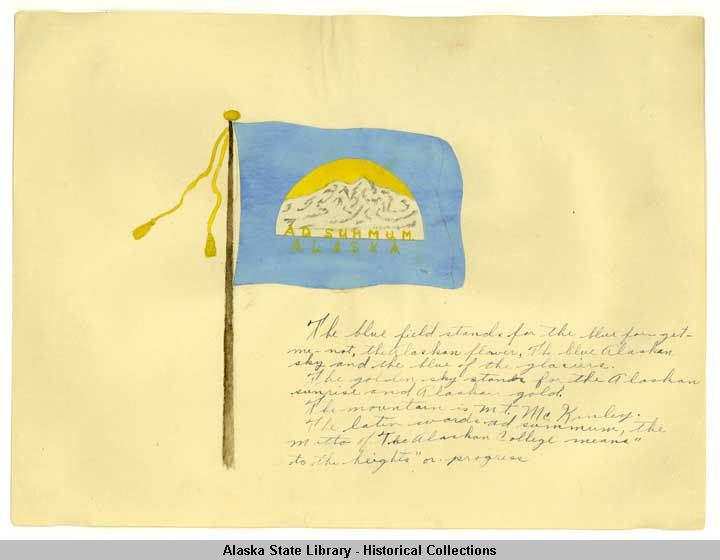
(1927)

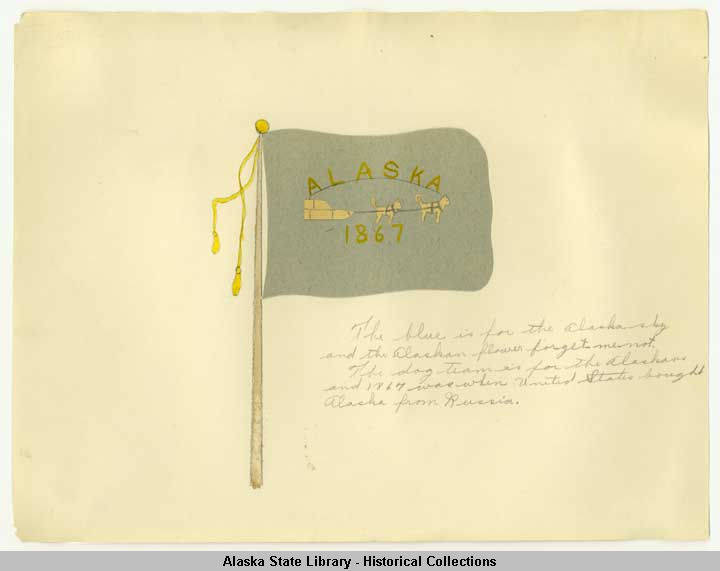
(1927)

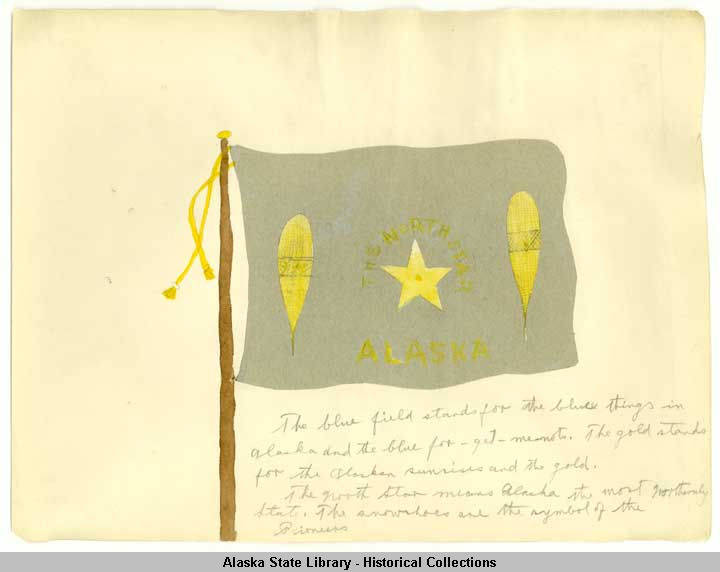
(1927)

(1927)

(1927)

(1927)

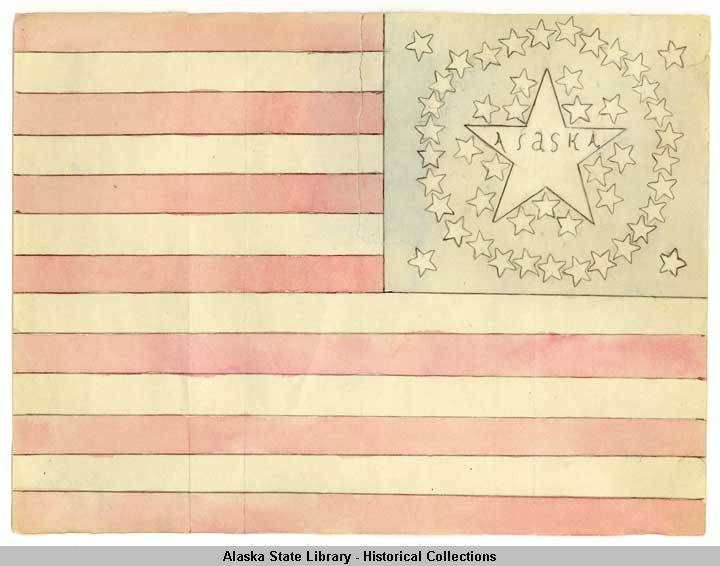
(1927)

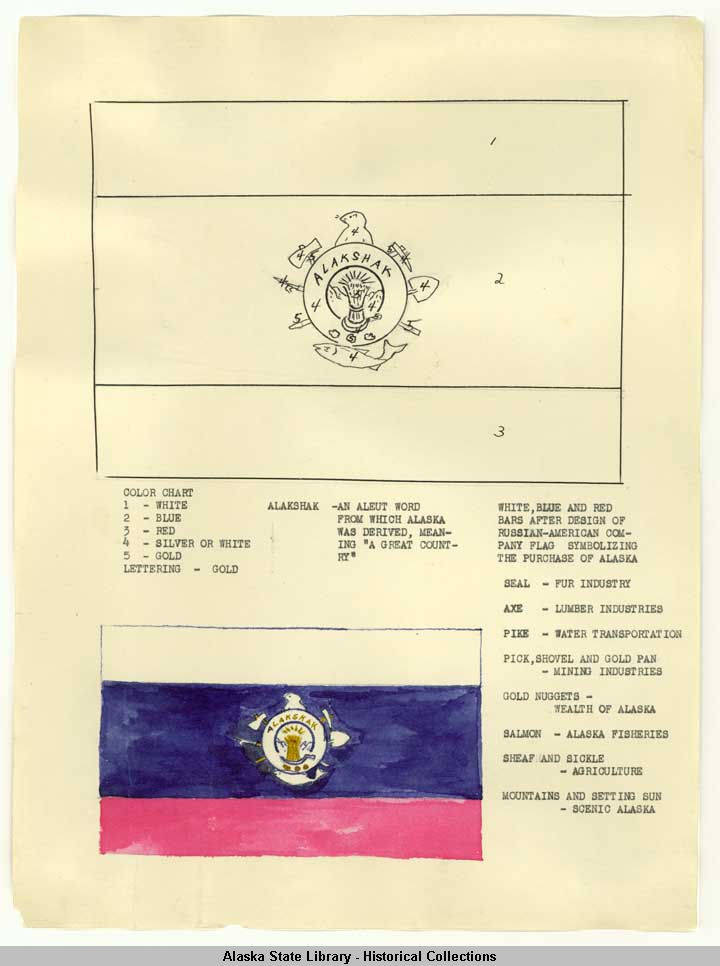
(1927)

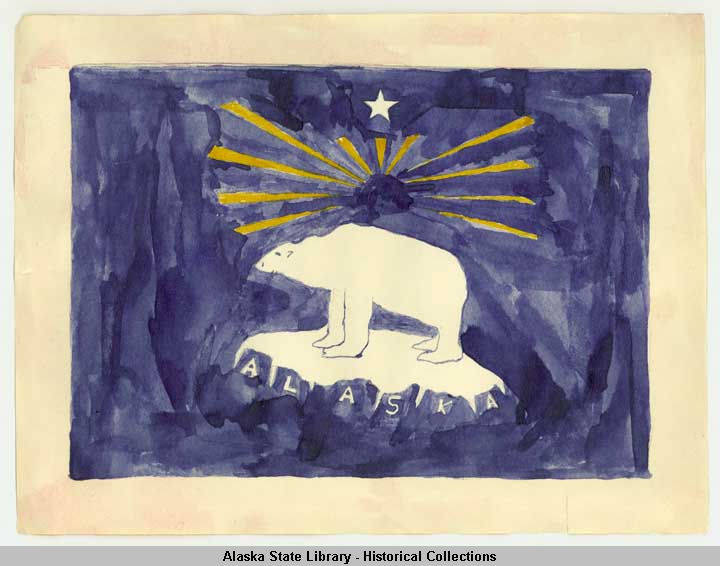
(1927)

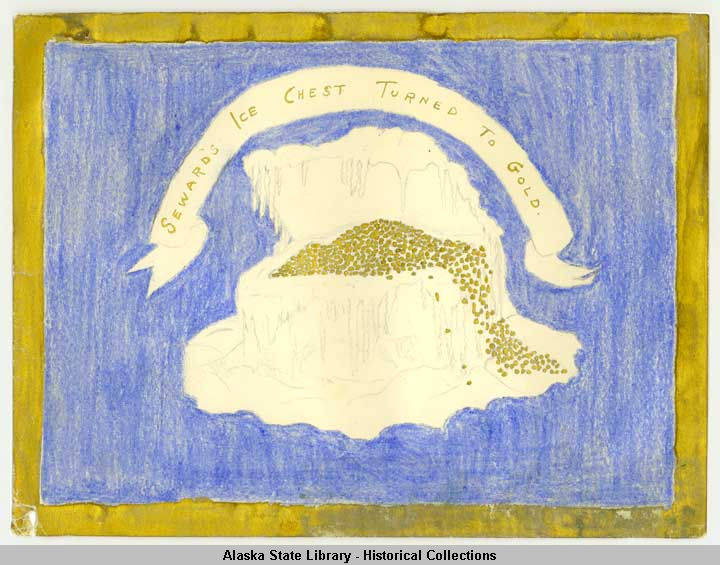
(1927)

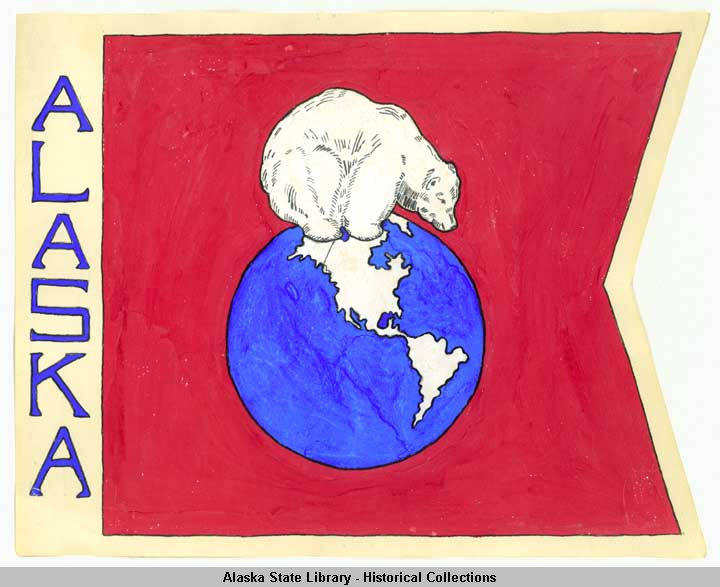
(1927)

(1927)

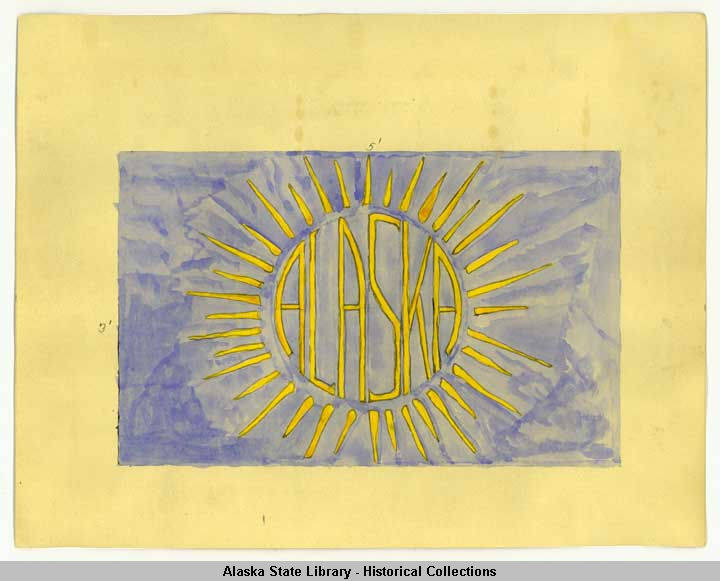
(1927)

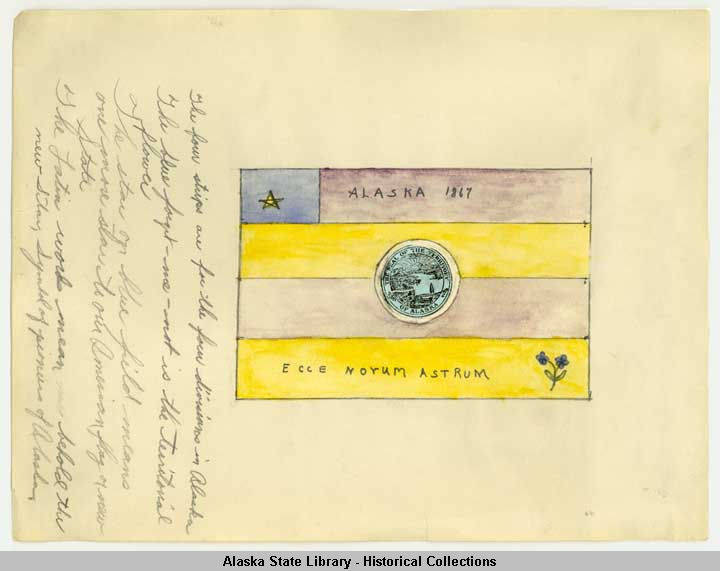
(1927)

(1927)

(1927)

(1927)

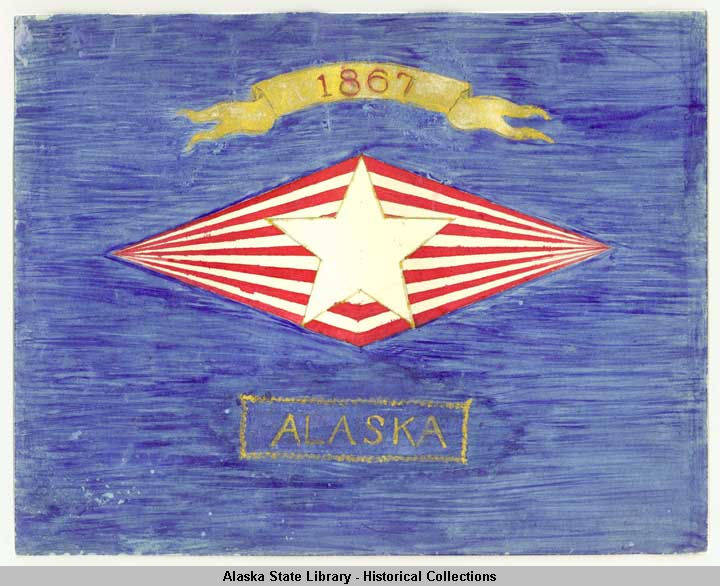
(1927)

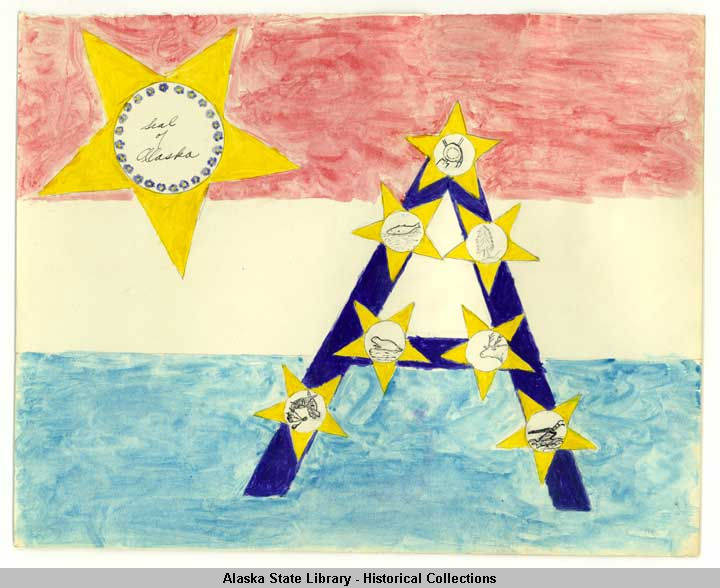
(1927)

(1927)

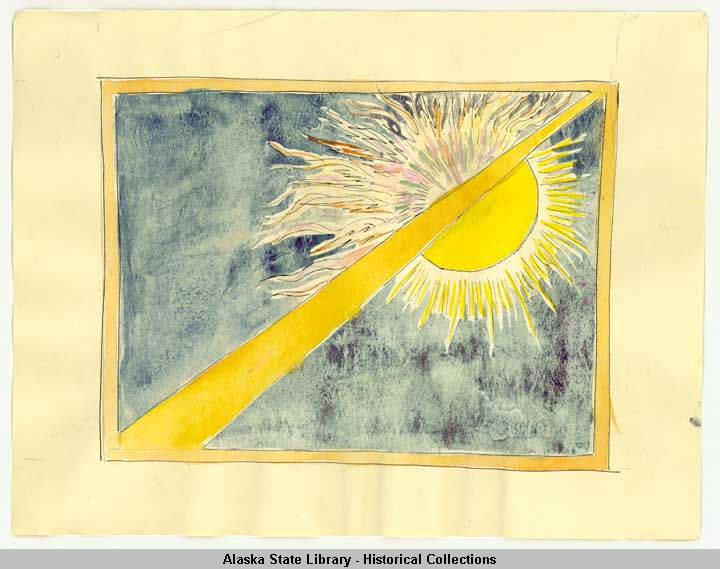
(1927)

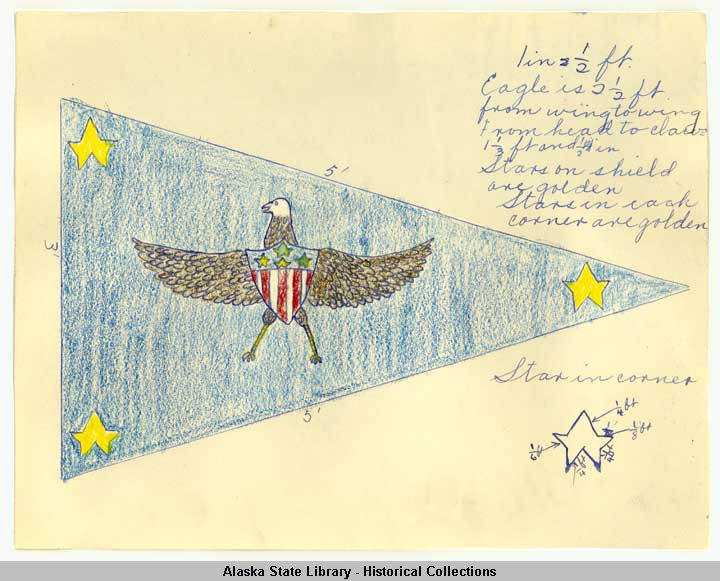
(1927)

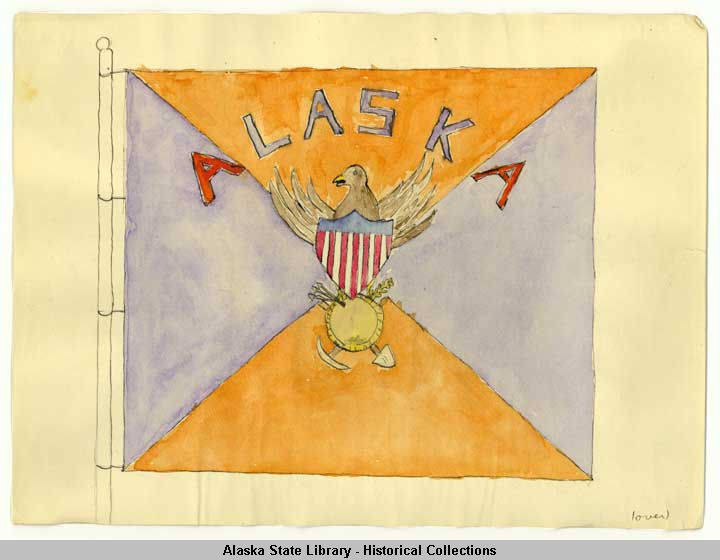
(1927)

(1927)

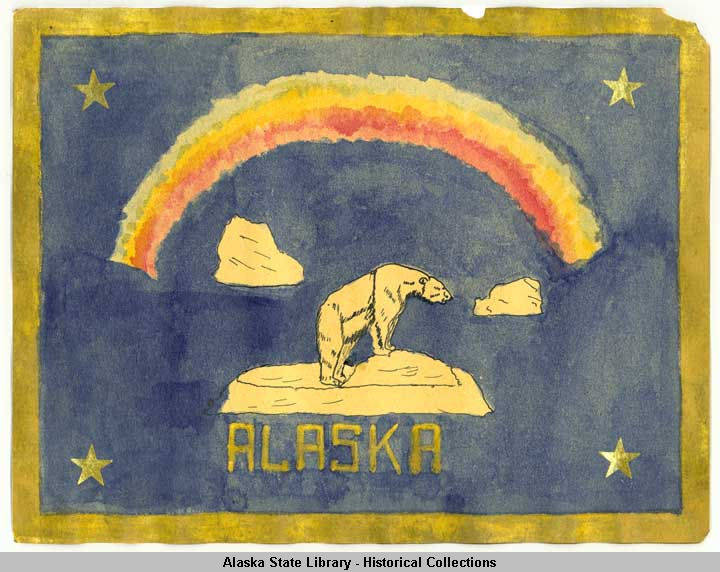
(1927)

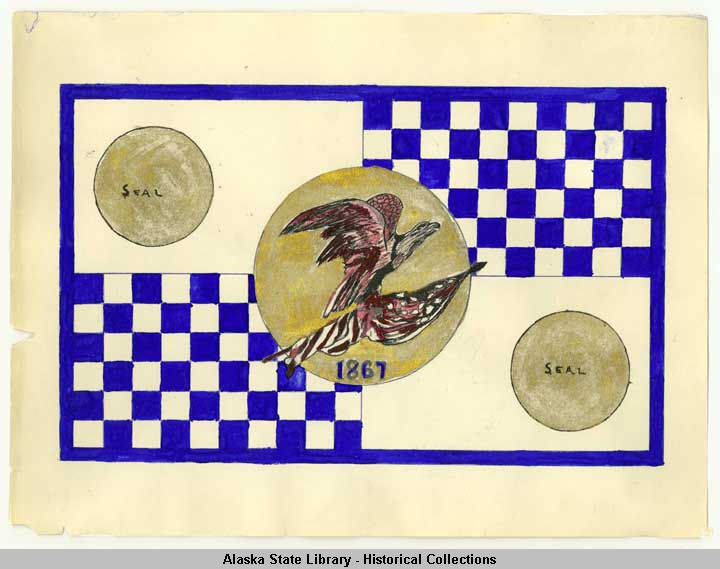
(1927)

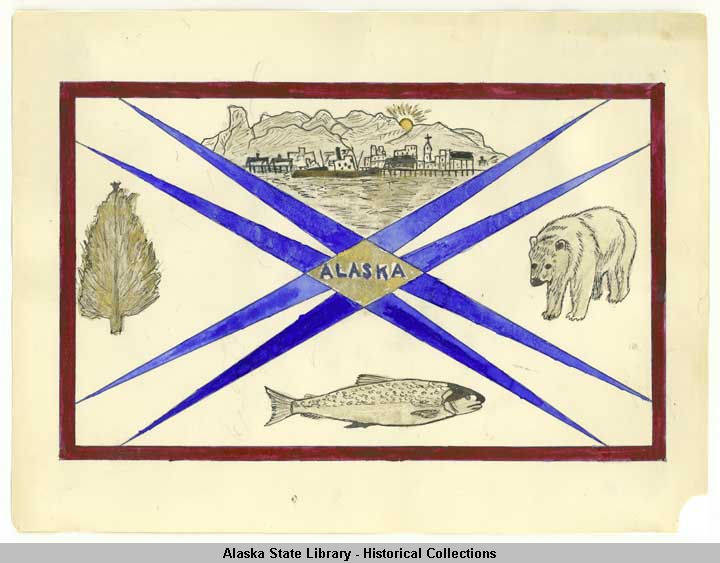
(1927)

(1927)

(1927)

(1927)

(1927)

(1927)

(1927)

(1976)

=== Arkansas ===
(1910)

(1913)

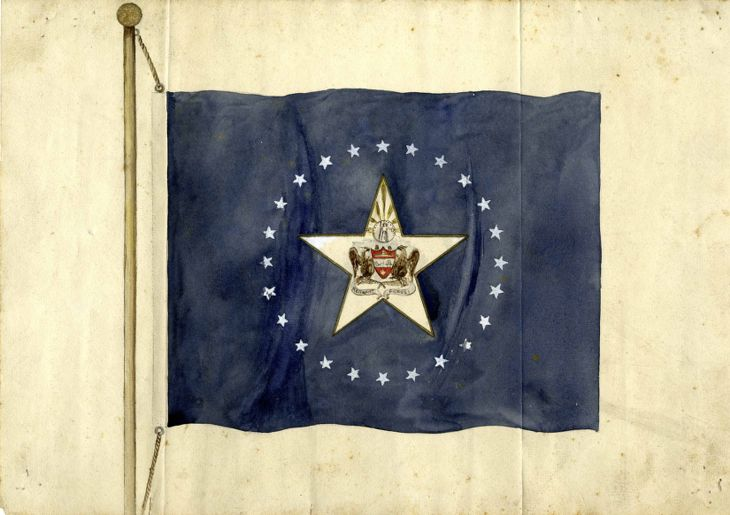
(1913)

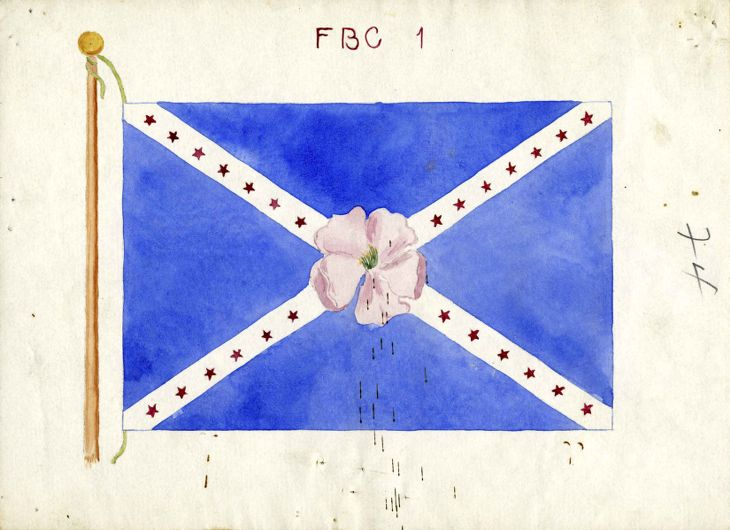
(1913)

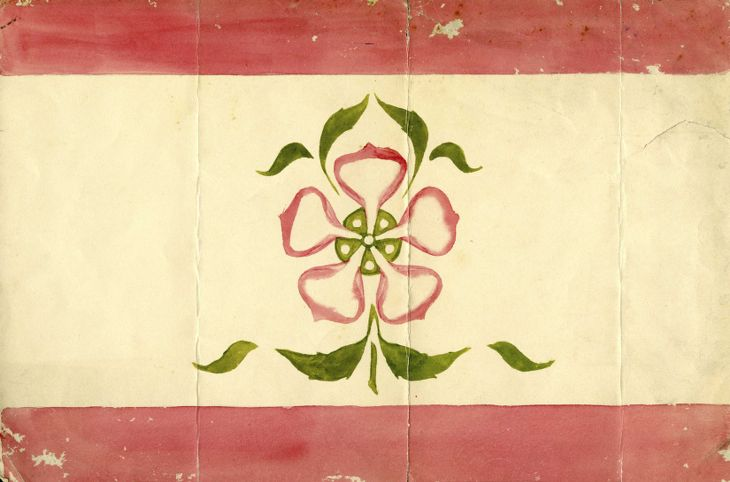
(1913)

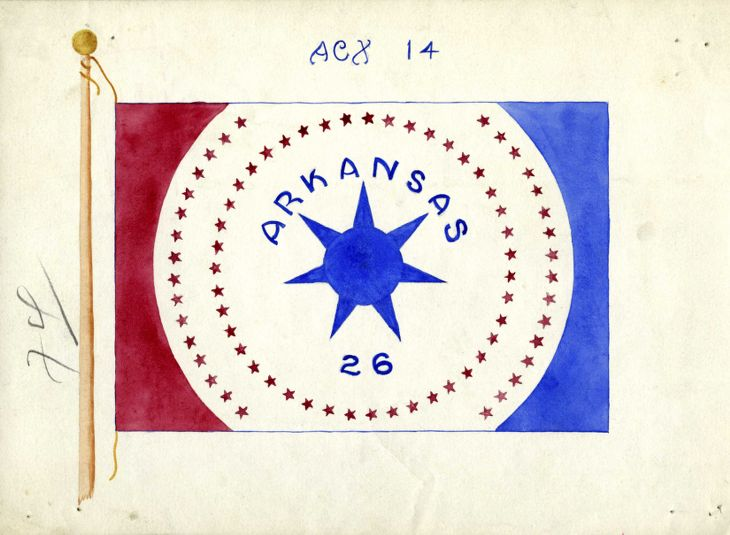
(1913)

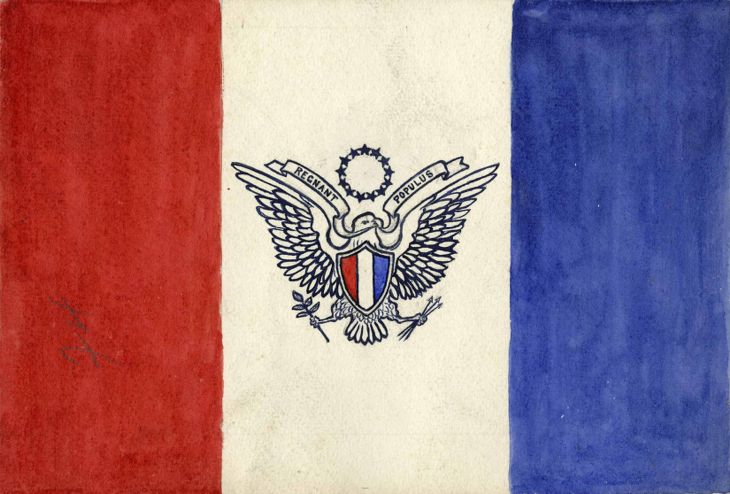
(1913)

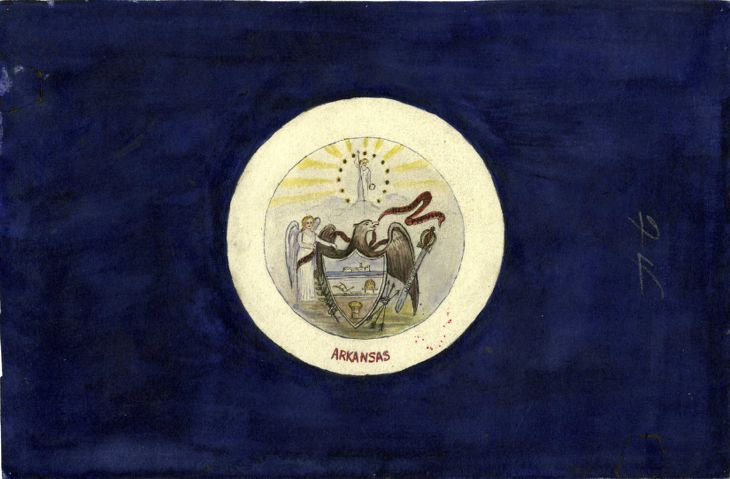
(1913)

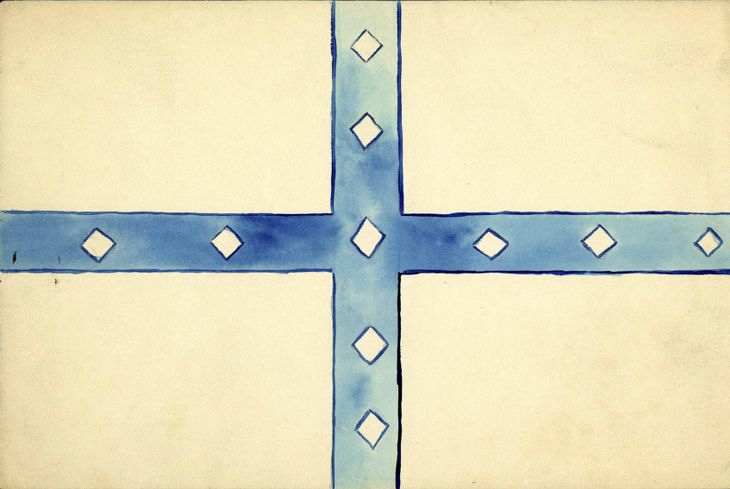
(1913)

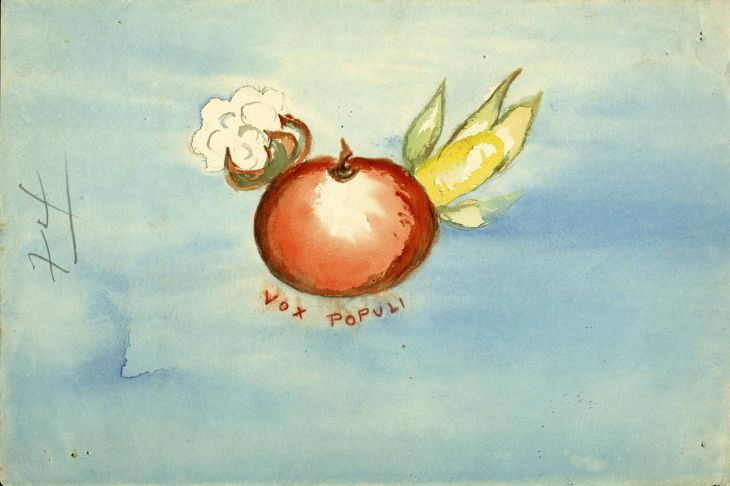
(1913)

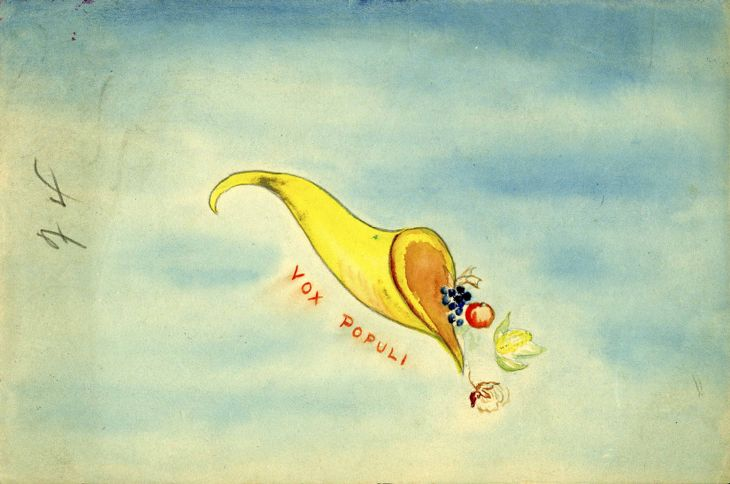
(1913)

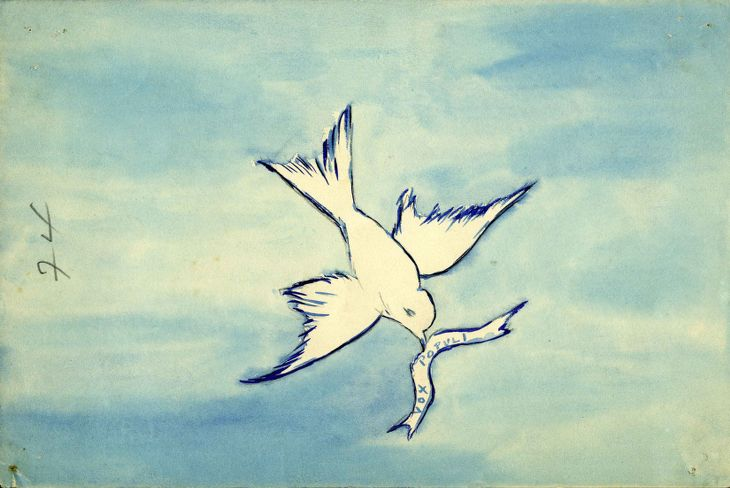
(1913)

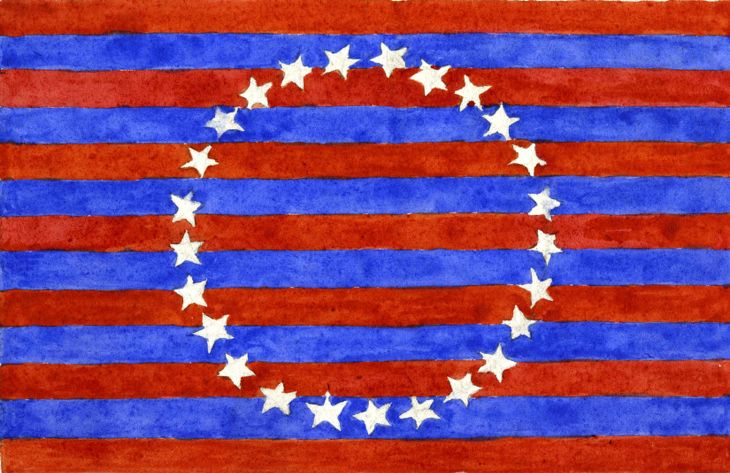
(1913)

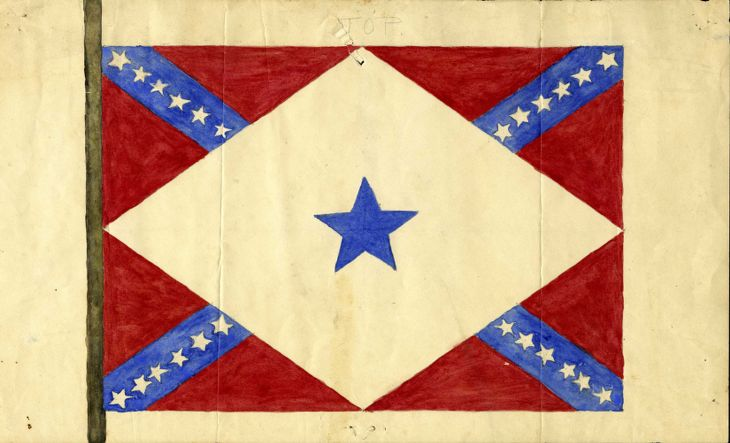
(1913)

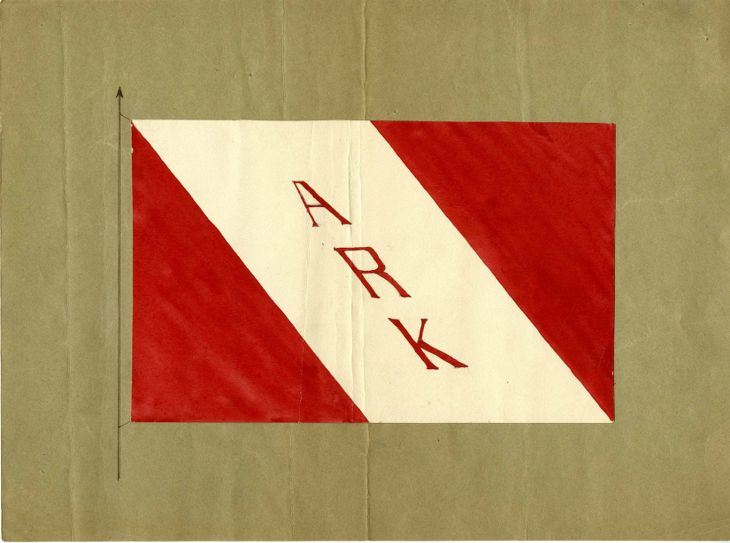
(1913)

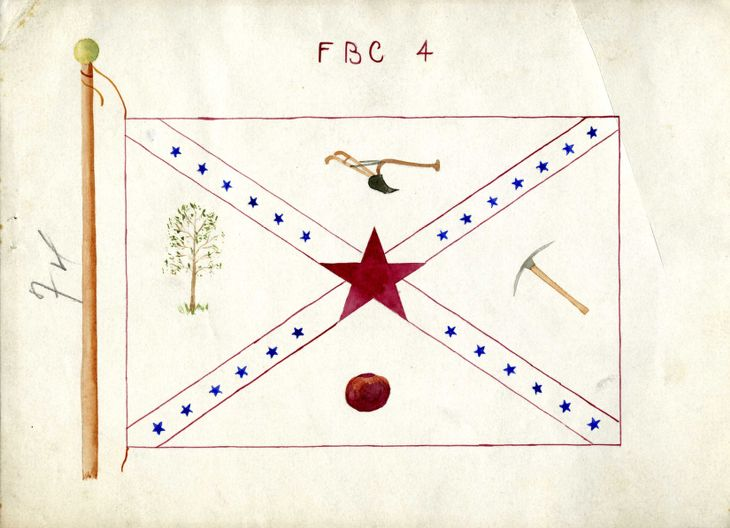
(1913)

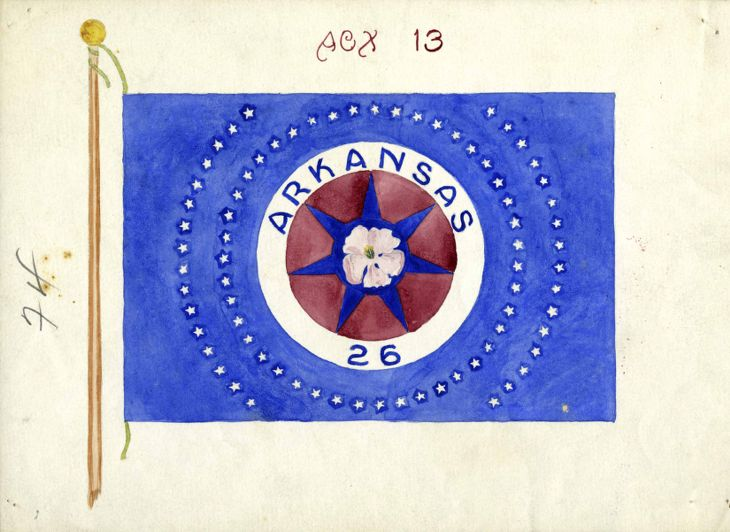
(1913)

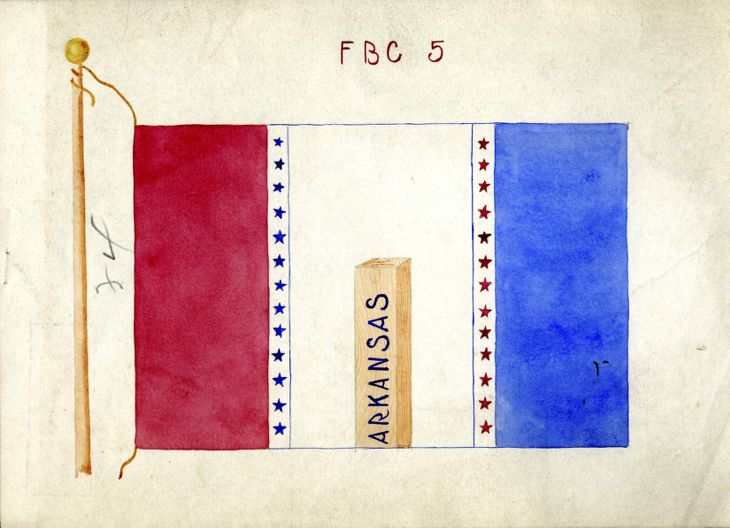
(1913)

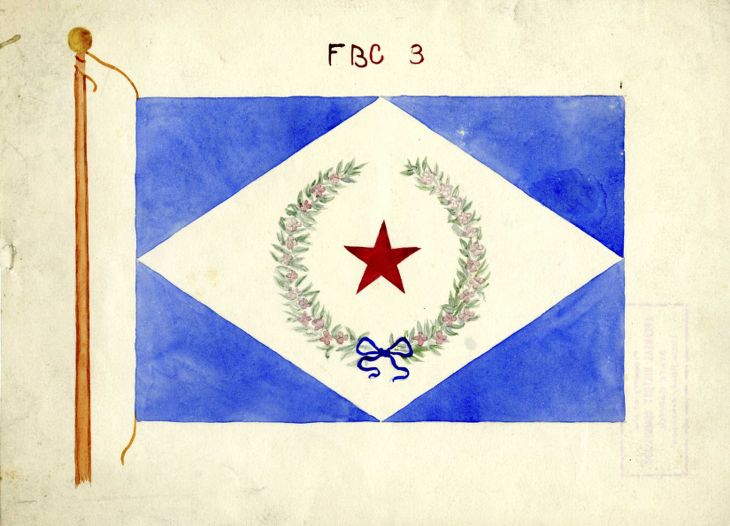
(1913)

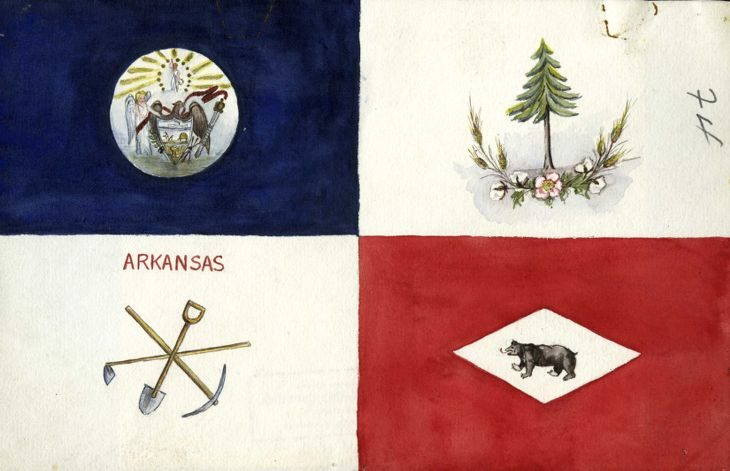
(1913)

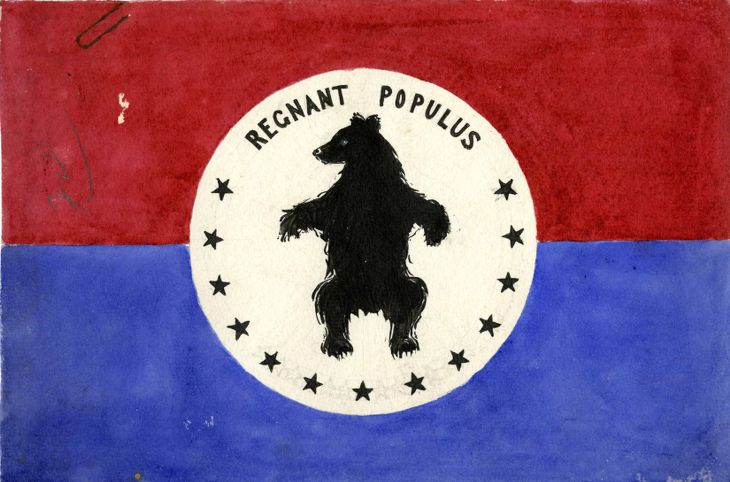
(1913)

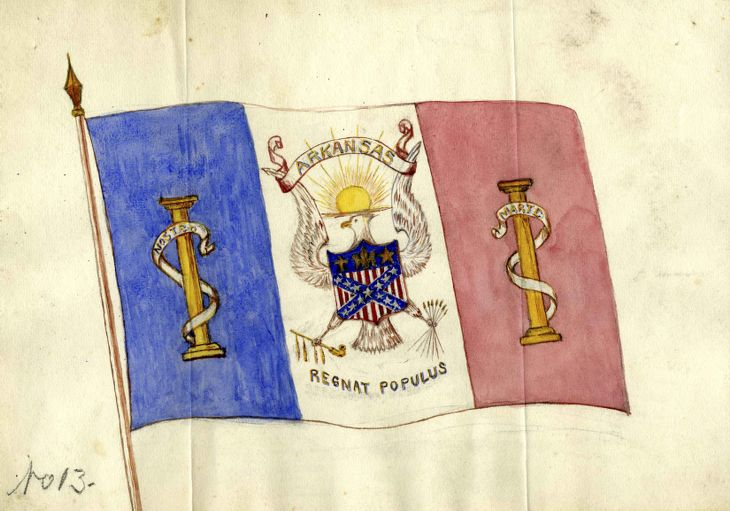
(1913)

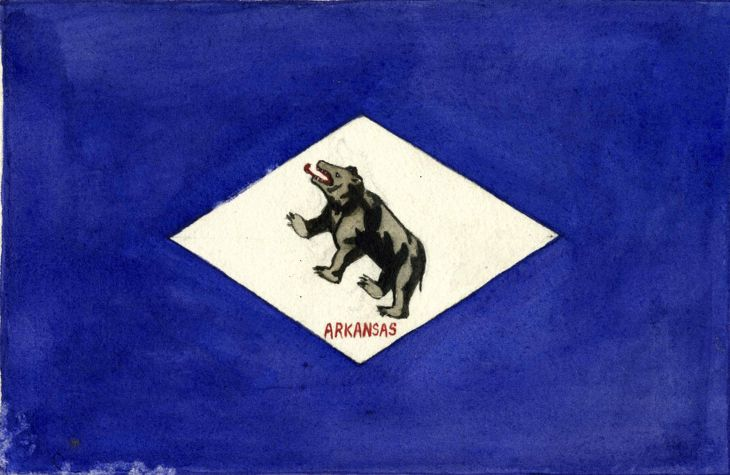
(1913)

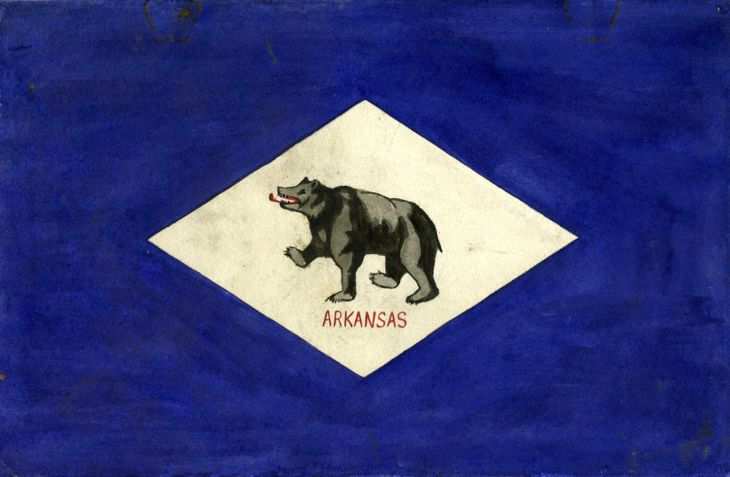
(1913)

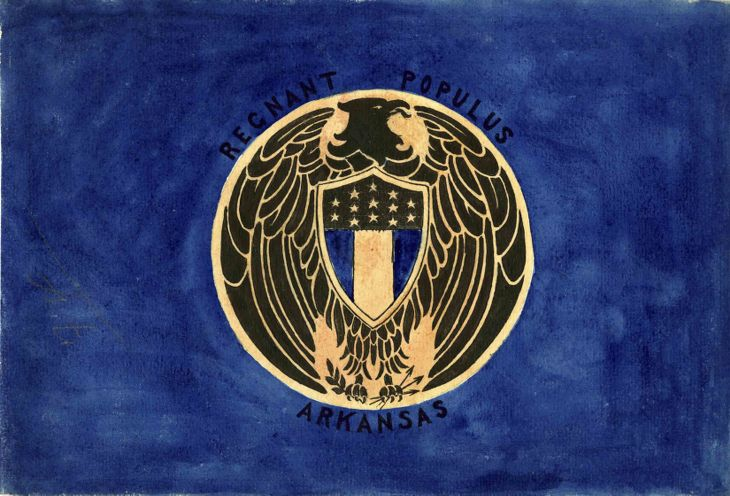
(1913)

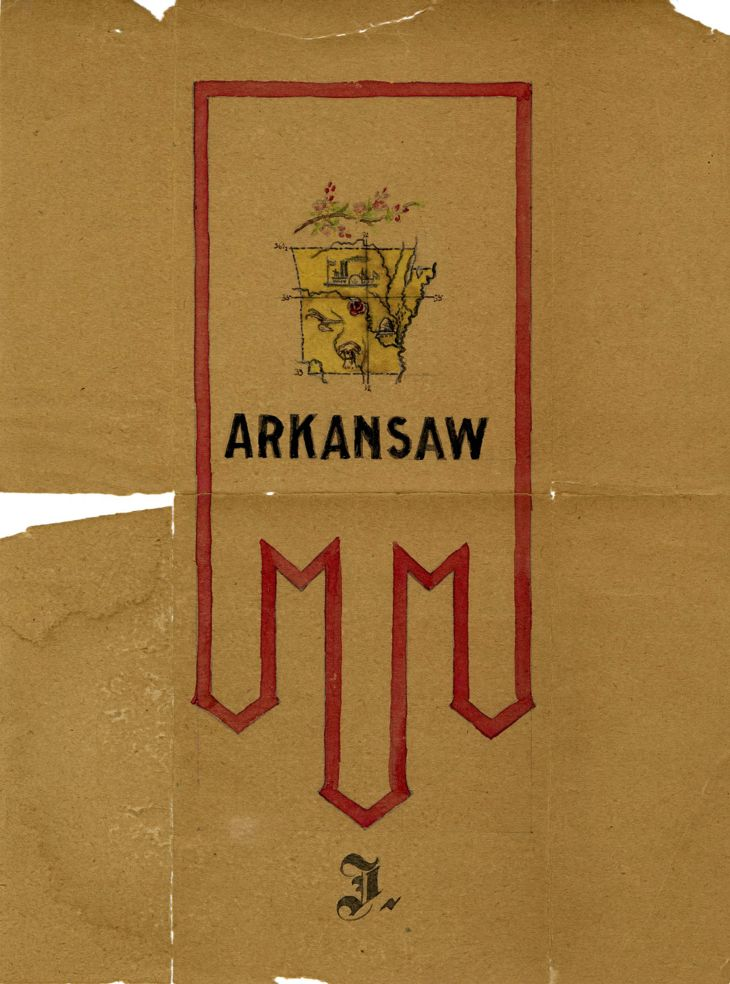
(1913)

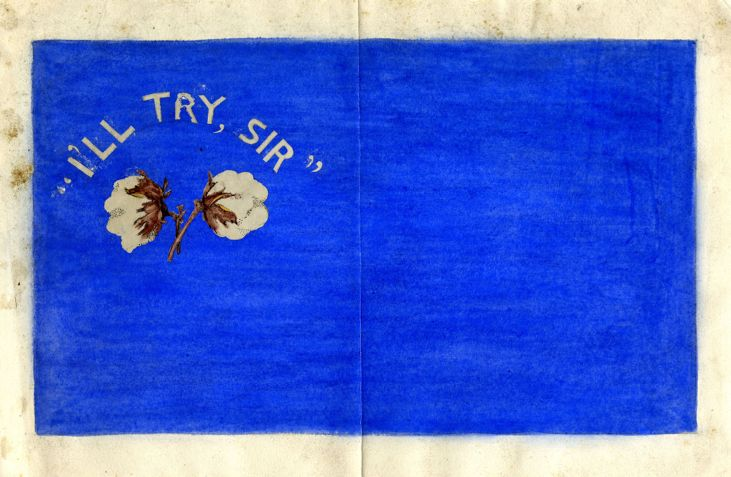
(1913)

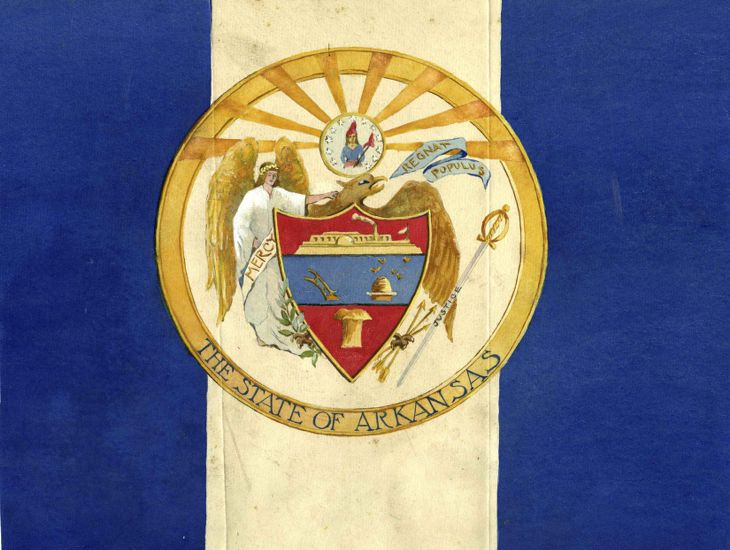
(1913)

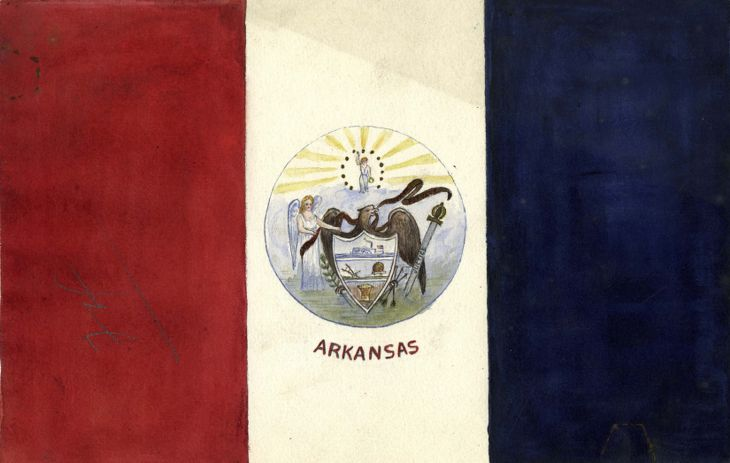
(1913)

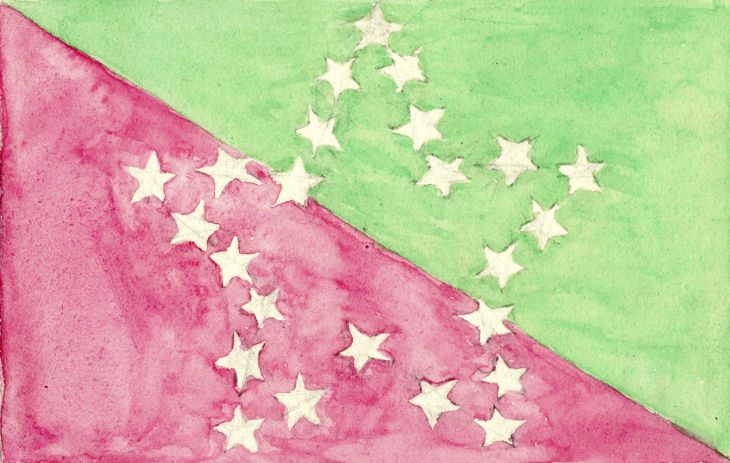
(1913)

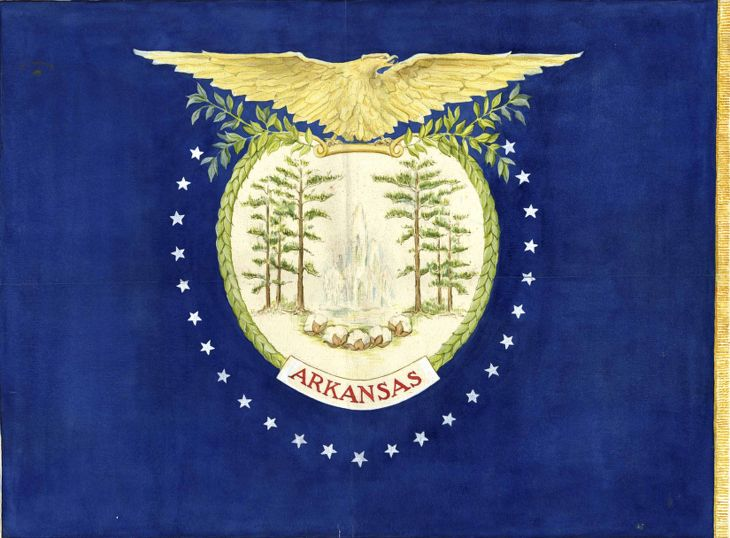
(1913)

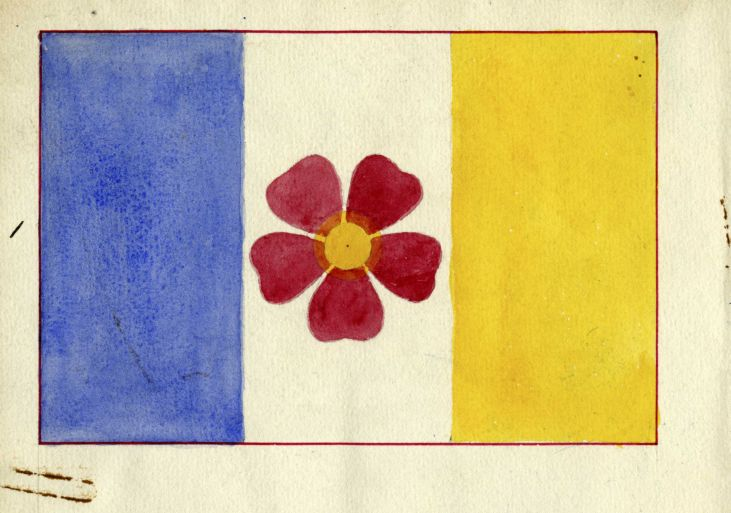
(1913)

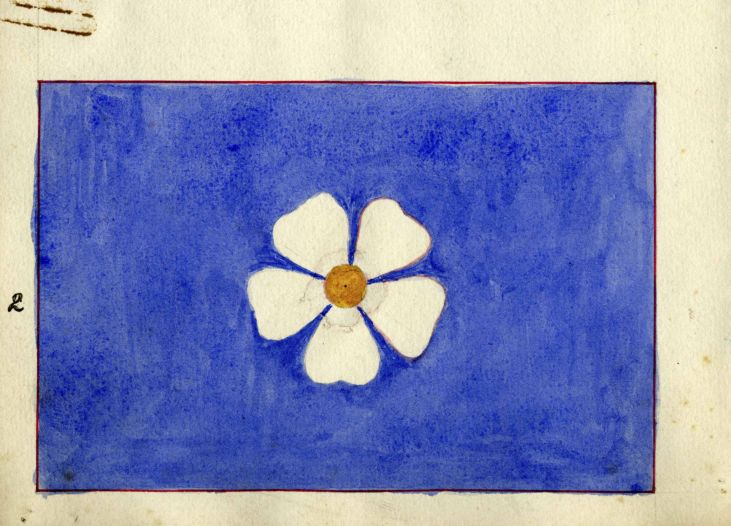
(1913)

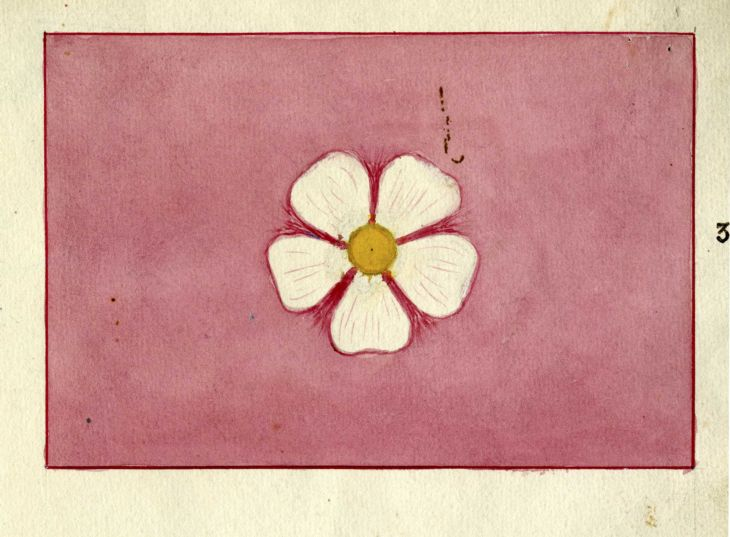
(1913)

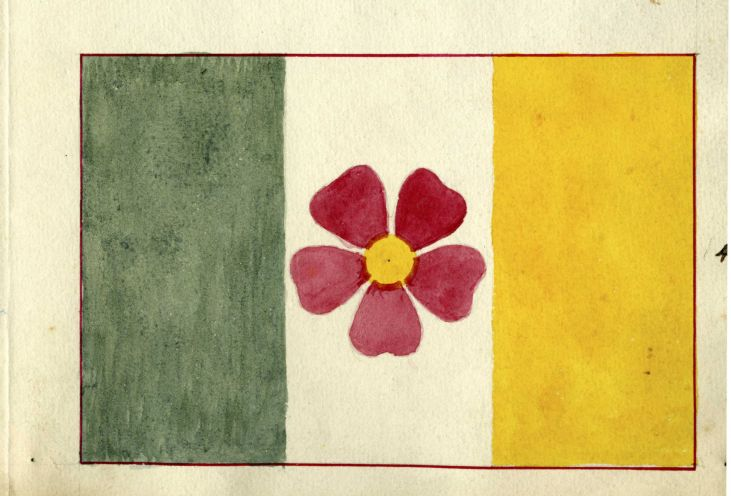
(1913)

(1913)

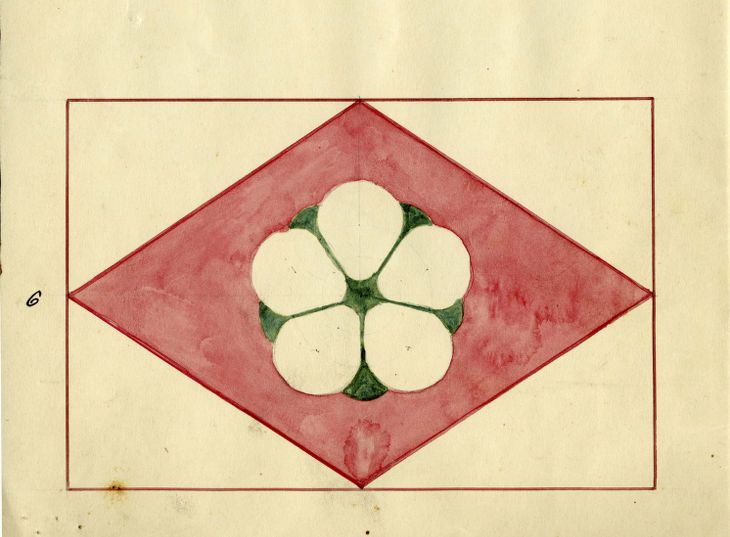
(1913)

(1913)

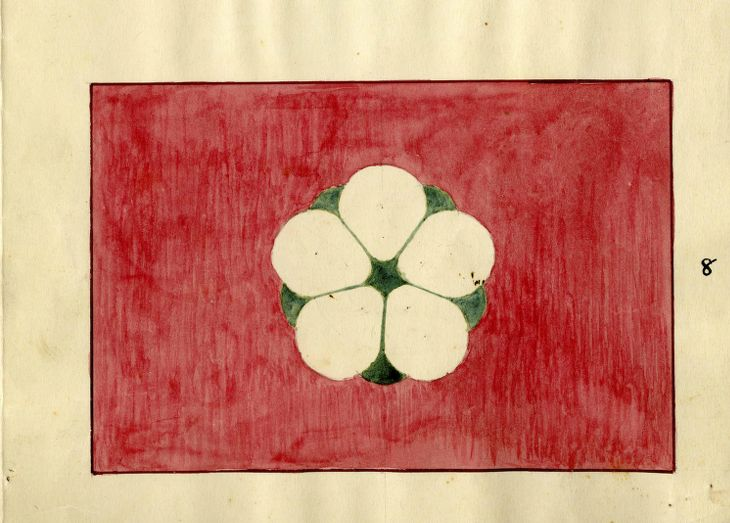
(1913)

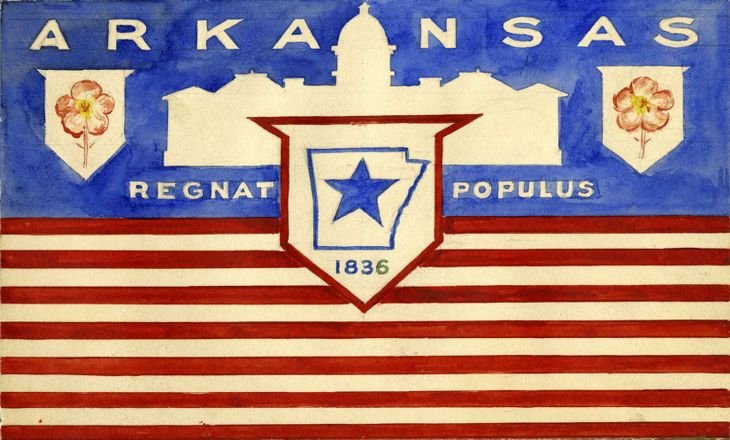
(1913)

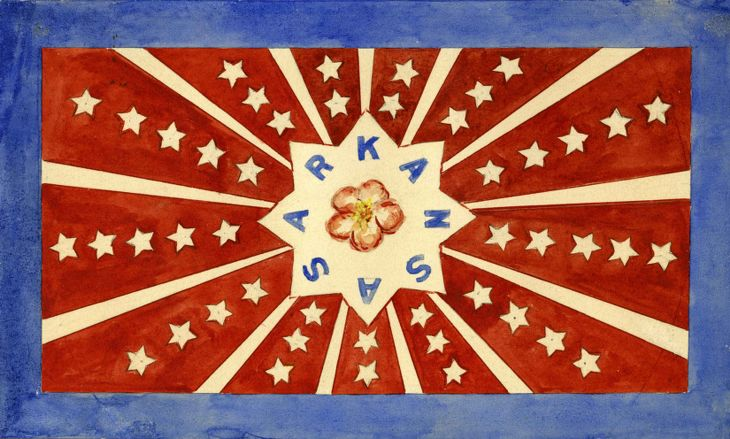
(1913)

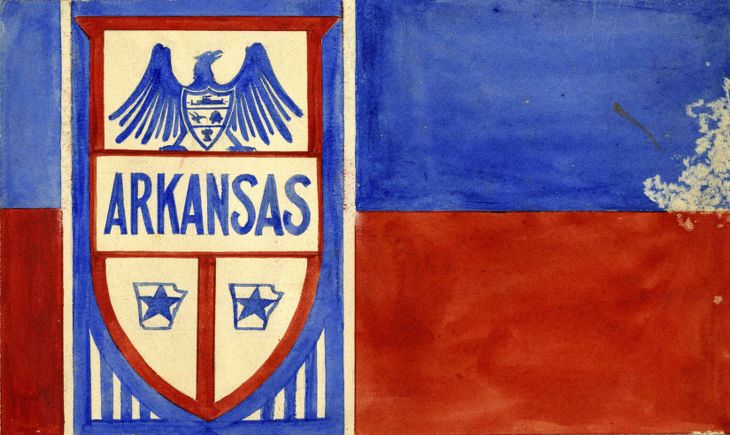
(1913)

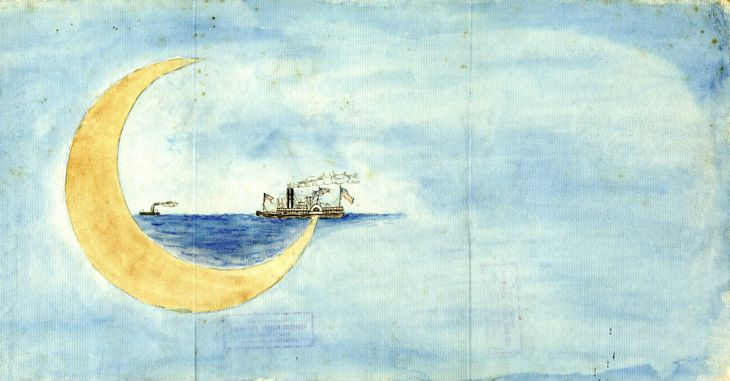
(1913)

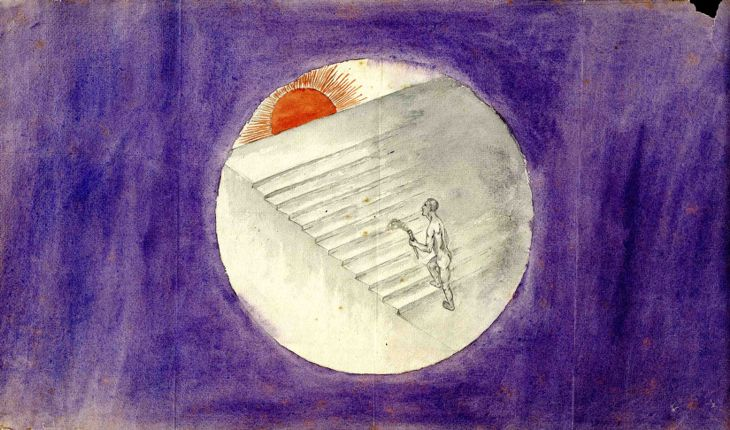
(1913)

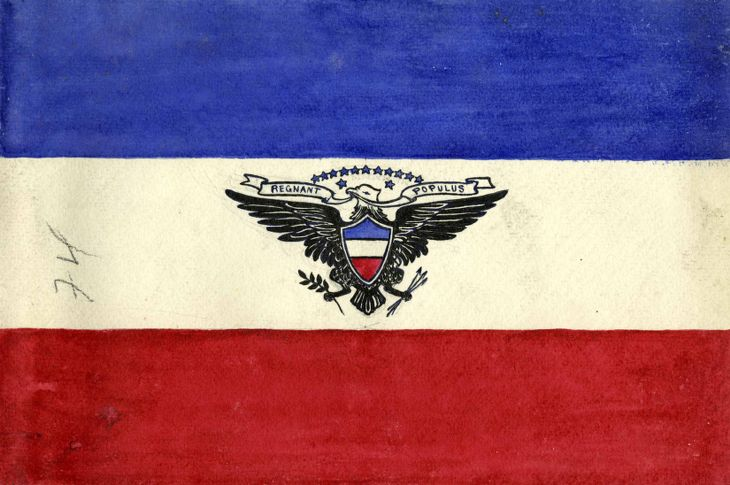
(1913)

=== California ===
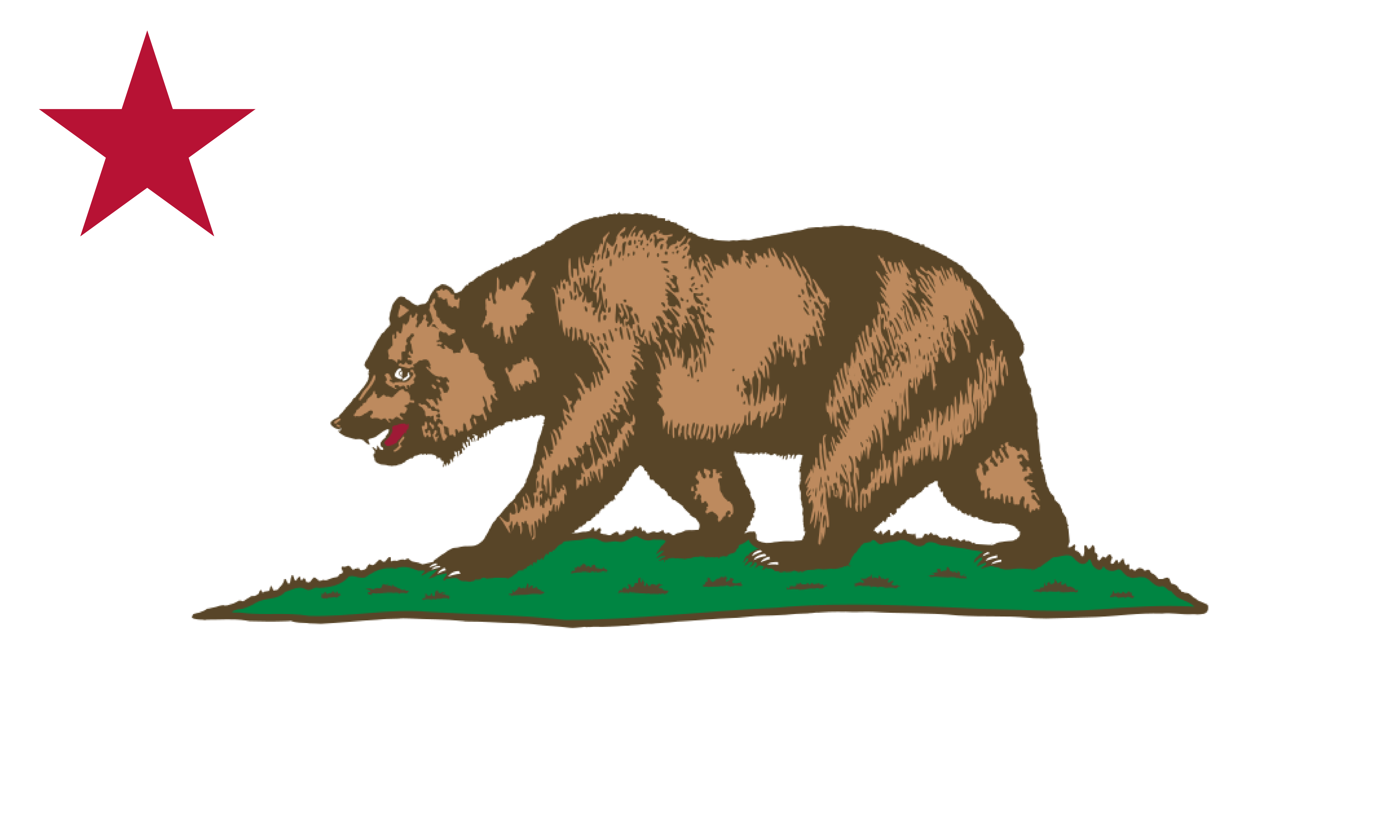
(1911)

=== Colorado ===
(1910)

(1911)

=== Connecticut ===
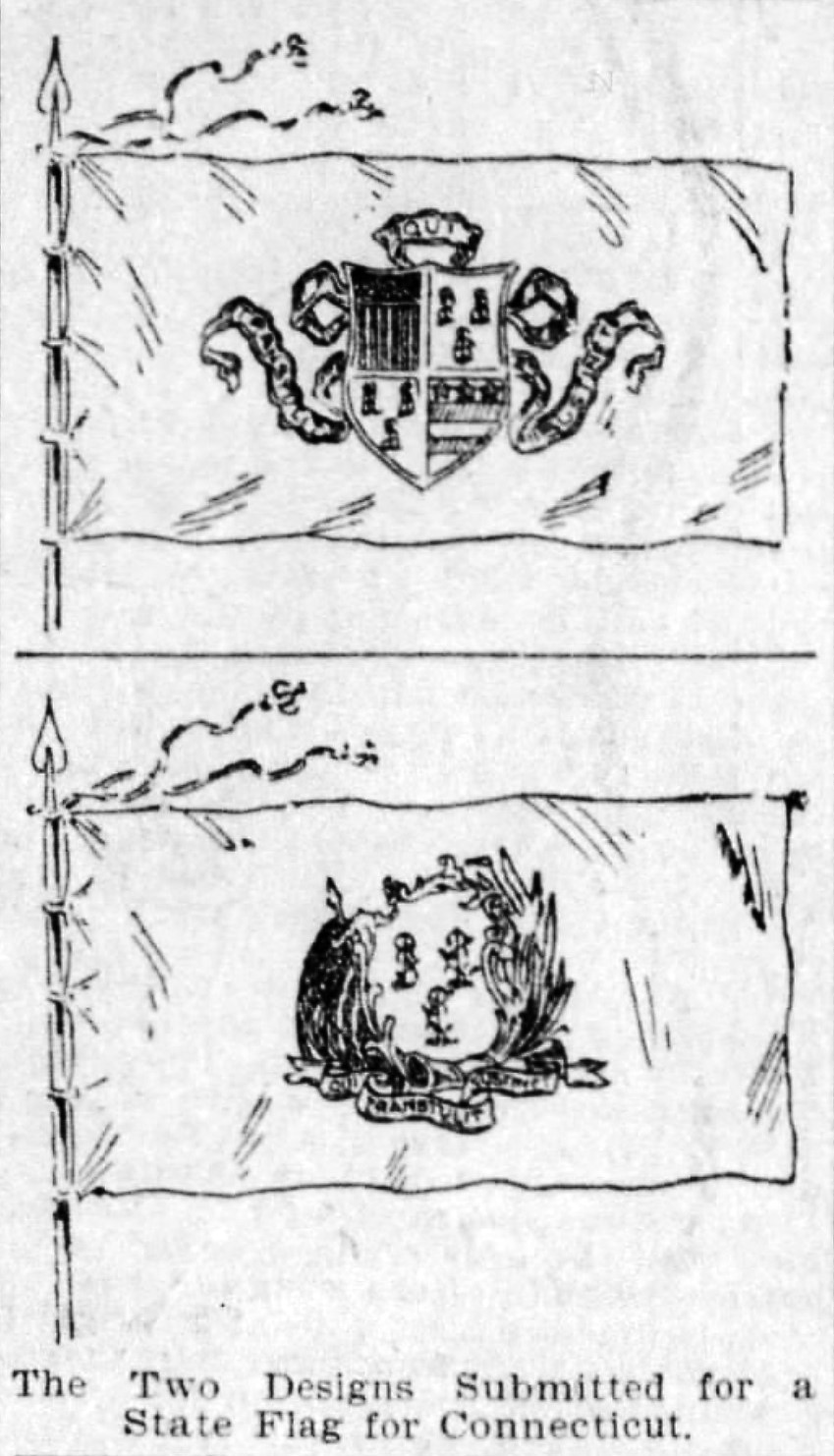
(1895)

(1976)

=== Idaho ===
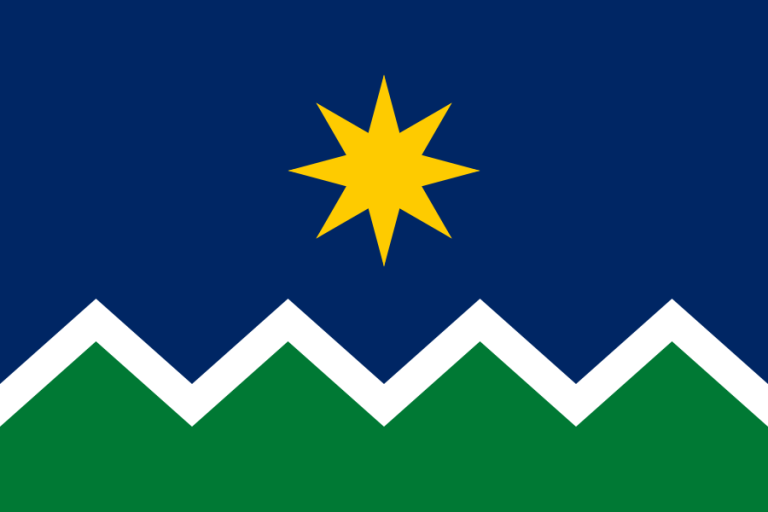
(2009)

=== Illinois ===
#200 (2024)

#869 (2024)

#2246 (2024)

#2752 (2024)

#3679 (2024)

#3754 (2024)

#4129 (2024)

#4220 (2024)

#4321 (2024)

#4669 (2024)

=== Indiana ===
(1917)

(1914)

"Centennial Flag" (1915)

"The Indian and Pioneer Banner" (1915)

"The Beech Tree and Red Clover Banner" (1915)

(1915)

(1915)

(1915)

(1915)

(1915)

"The Buffalo Banner" (1915)

(1915)

=== Kansas ===
(1916)

=== Maine ===
(2024)

=== Massachusetts ===
(2020)

#2 (2025)

#3 (2025)

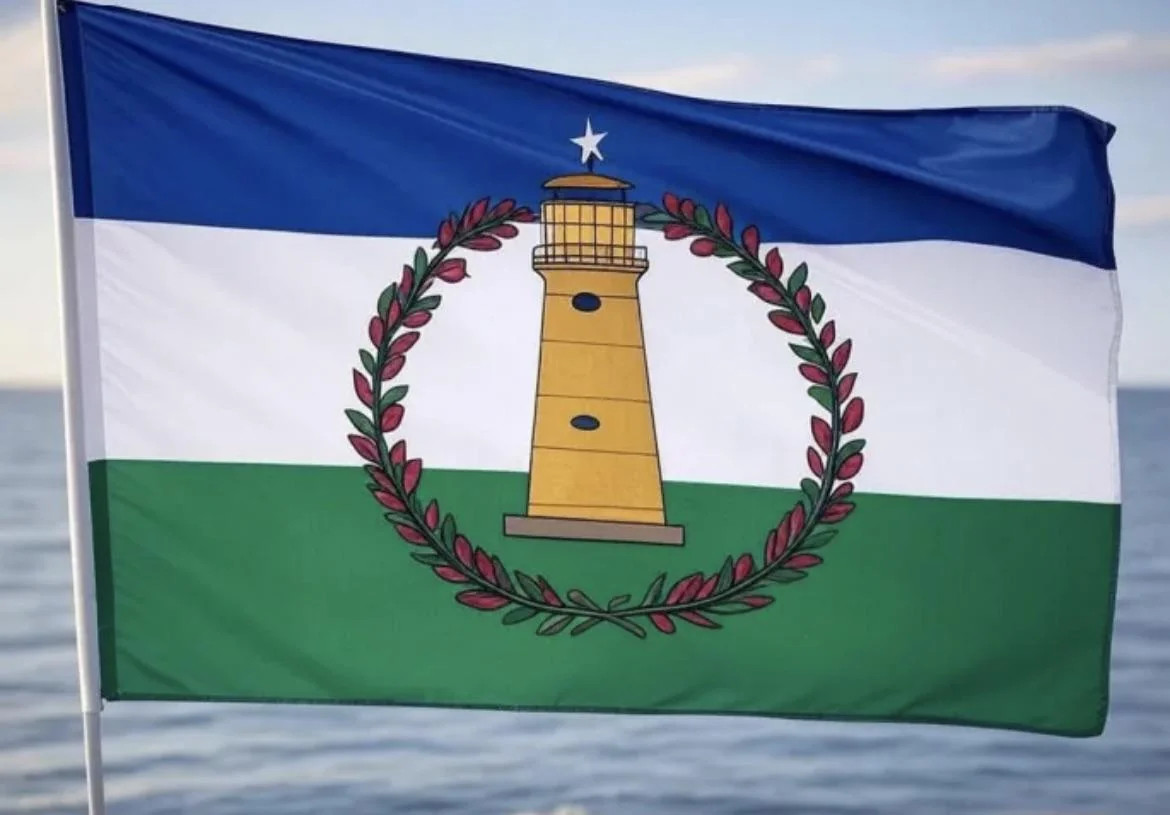
#10 (2025)

#29 (2025)

#38 (2025)

#58 (2025)

#70 (2025)

#105 (2025)

#110 (2025)

#119 (2025)

#130 (2025)

#146 (2025)

#176 (2025)

#193 (2025)

#252 (2025)

#272 (2025)

#297 (2025)

#317 (2025)

#349 (2025)

#354 (2025)

#518 (2025)

#542 (2025)

#566 (2025)

#571 (2025)

#666 (2025)

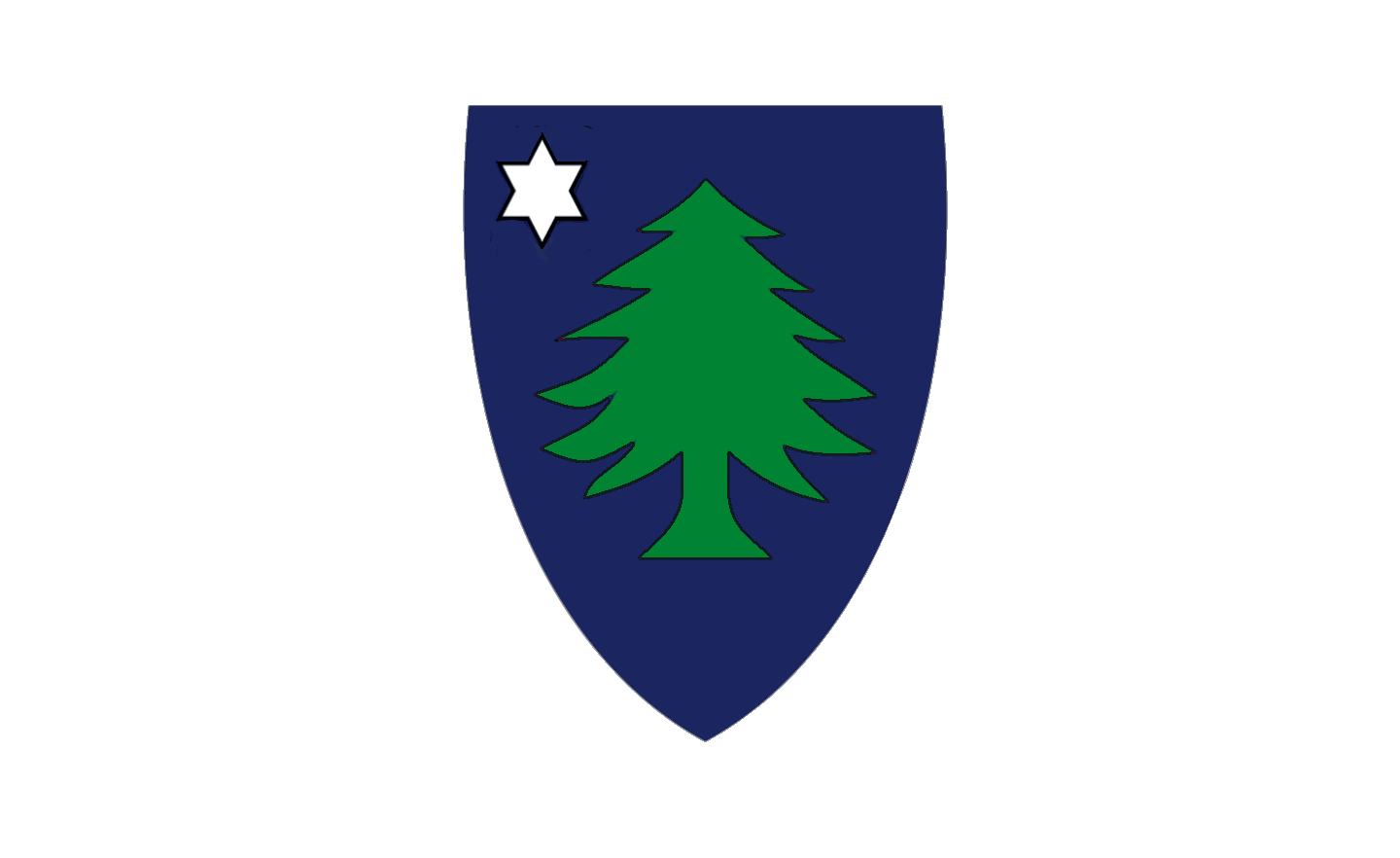
#734 (2025)

#784 (2025)

#788 (2025)

#793 (2025)

#804 (2025)

#815 (2025)

#816 (2025)

#837 (2025)

#858 (2025)

#863 (2025)

#865 (2025)

#908 (2025)

#917 (2025)

#918 (2025)

#928 (2025)

#1018 (2025)

#1022 (2025)

#1056 (2025)

#1074 (A) (2025)

#1074 (B) (2025)

#1141 (2025)

#1151 (2025)

=== Minnesota ===
(1957)

"North Star Flag" (1989)

(2001)

F1953 (2023)

F2100 (2023)

F944 "Mirror of the Sky Flag" (2023)

F29 "Starflake Flag" (2023)

(2023)

(2023)

(2023)

(2023)

(2023)

(2023)

=== Mississippi ===
(2001)

"Hospitality Flag" (2014)

Mississippi State Flag Shield Proposal (2020)

Mississippi Flag Proposal E1322 (2020)

=== Missouri ===
"Holcomb Flag" (1909)

=== Montana ===
(1974)

(1979)

=== Nevada ===
(1926)

(1926)

(1926)

(1926)

(1926)

(1926)

(1926)

(1926)

(1926)

(1926)

(1926)

(1926)

(1926)

(1926)

(1926)

(1926)

(1926)

(1926)

(1926)

(1926)

(1926)

(1926)

(1926)

(1926)

(1926)

(1926)

(1926)

(1926)

(1926)

(1926)

(1926)

(1926)

(1926)

(1926)

(1926)

(1926)

(1926)

(1926)

(1926)

(1926)

(1926)

(1953)

(2001)

=== New Hampshire ===
(2023)

=== New Jersey ===
(2016)

(2016)

(2016)

(2016)

(2016)

(2016)

(2016)

(2016)

=== North Carolina ===
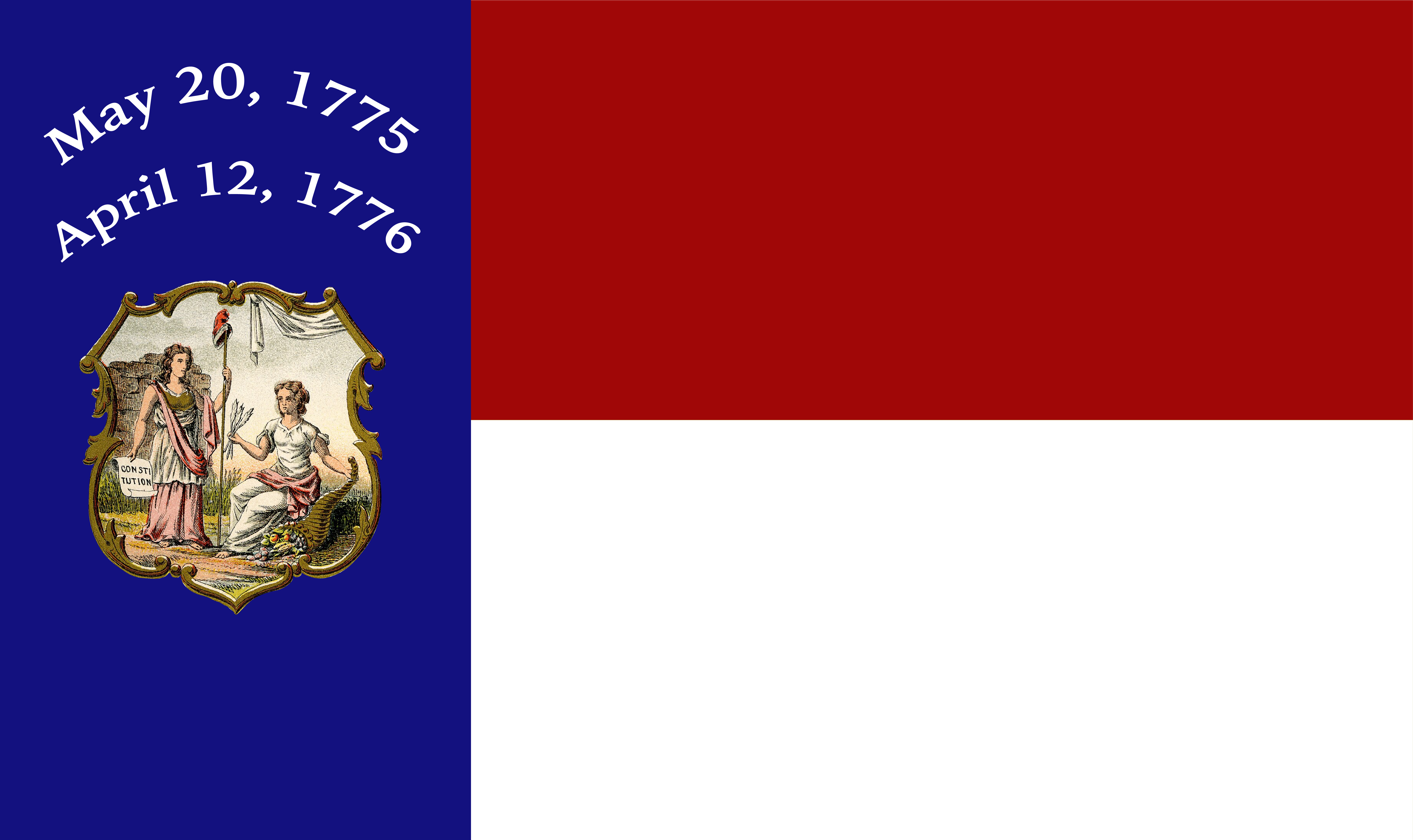
(1885)

=== North Dakota ===
(1909)

(1951)

=== Oregon ===
(1976)

(2008)

(2008)

(2008)

(2008)

(2008)

(2008)

(2008)

(2008)

(2008)

(2008)

(2013)

=== Pennsylvania ===
(2004)

(2007)

(2009)

"Keystone Flag" (2017)

=== South Carolina ===
(1861)

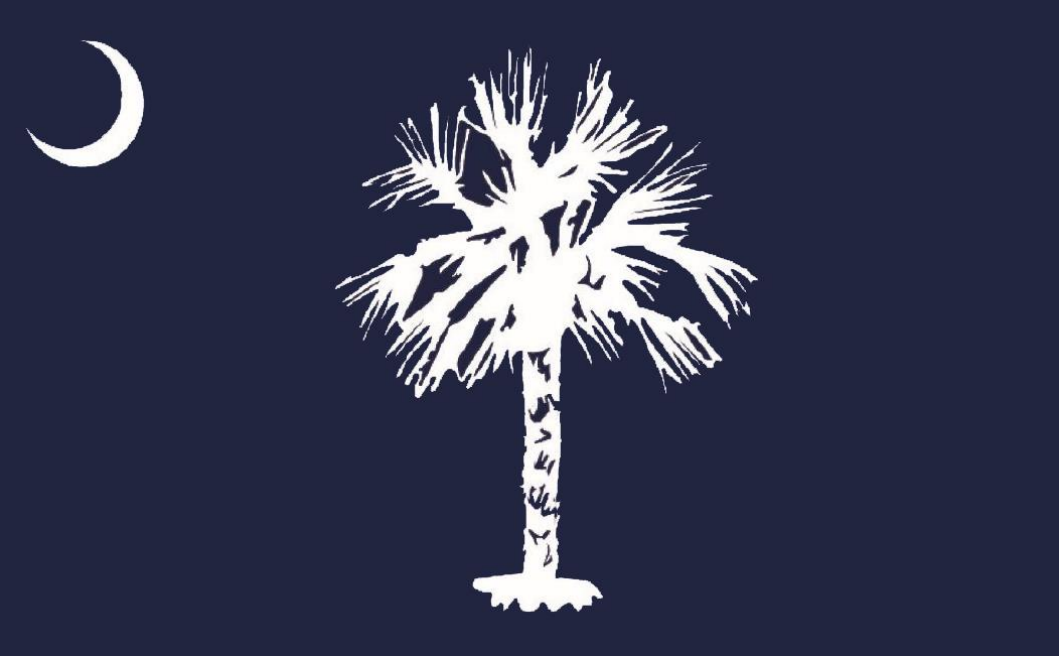
(2019)

Standard A (2020)

Standard B (2020)

=== South Dakota ===
(2012)

=== Utah ===
(1927)

(2001)

(2002)

(2002)

(2002)

(2002)

(2002)

(2002)

(2002)

(2002)

(2002)

(2002)

(2002)

(2002)

(2002)

(2002)

(2002)

(2002)

(2002)

(2002)

(2002)

(2002)

(2002)

(2002)

(2002)

(2002)

(2002)

(2002)

(2002)

(2002)

(2002)

(2002)

(2002)

(2002)

(2002)

(2002)

(2002)

(2002)

(2002)

(2002)

(2002)

(2019)

(2022)

(2022)

(2022)

(2022)

(2022)

=== Virginia ===
(1976)

(2001)

=== Washington ===
(1976)

=== Wyoming ===
(1911)

== Federal District flag ==
=== Washington, D.C. ===
(1924)

(1924)

(2002)
